= Project Moon Dust =

US Air Force Cold War project

Project Moon Dust was a covert project by the United States Air Force during the Cold War that existed at the Air Force Missile Development Center at Holloman Air Force Base. The aim of the project was to recover objects and debris from spacecraft that survived re-entry through the atmosphere back to Earth and to exploit the discovery of Soviet hardware when it temporarily fell into American hands.

== See also ==
- Project Blue Fly
- Project Round Robin
