= Project Round Robin =

Cold War–Era US Military project

Project Round Robin was a covert project by the United States Air Force during the Cold War that existed at the Air Force Missile Development Center at Holloman Air Force Base. The aim of the project was to exploit any Soviet space material that fell into American hands, including rocket boosters and satellites.

== See also ==
- Project Blue Fly
- Project Moon Dust
