= Project Blue Fly =

Project Blue Fly is a former covert project of the United States Air Force during the Cold War that existed at the Air Force Missile Development Center at Holloman Air Force Base. The aim of the project was to exploit the discovery of Soviet hardware when it landed in American or allied hands permanently.

== See also ==
- Project Moon Dust
- Project Round Robin
