= 96th Test Group =

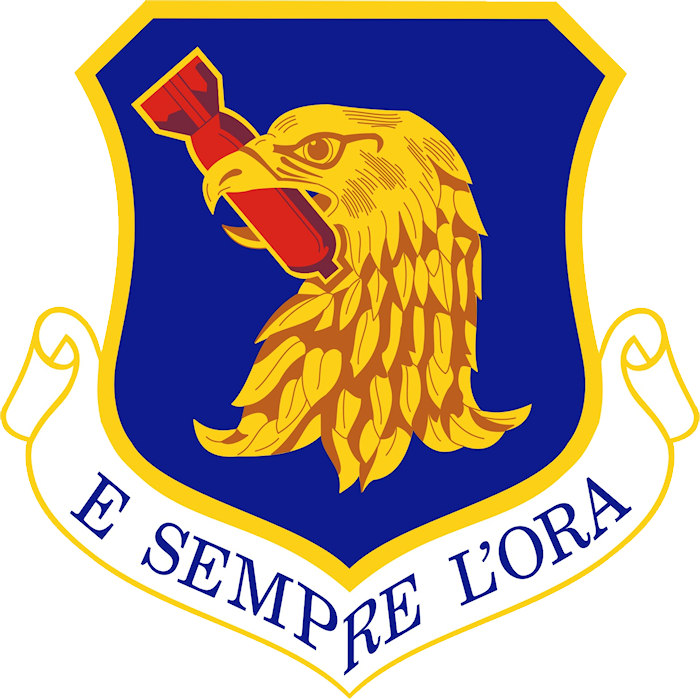
- 96th Test Group - emblem
- Active: 2012-2016
- Branch: United States Air Force
- Role: Operational testing
- Part of: 96th Test Wing

The 96th Test Group was a United States Air Force unit, based at Holloman Air Force Base, New Mexico. It was a Geographically Separate Unit (GSU), assigned to the 96th Test Wing, Eglin Air Force Base, Florida.

The Test Group's function was to operate test facilities for high speed sled track testing, navigation and guidance system testing, radar signature measurements, weapon systems flight testing, and Air Force liaison for all AF programs tested at White Sands Missile Range (WSMR).

The group consisted of 90 authorized military, 239 authorized civilians, and 161 authorized contractor personnel with two-thirds of these being scientists, engineers, and technicians.

It was established as a replacement for the 46th Test Group, which was inactivated. It assumed personnel and equipment of the 46th Test Group. On 1 December 2016 its mission, personnel, and assets appear to have been absorbed by the 704th Test Group.

== Units ==
- 586th Flight Test Squadron

Provided deployable operational support for test aircraft operating from Holloman AFB. The squadron flight tests guidance systems, laser systems, air-to-air/air-to-ground systems, long-range and standoff weapons, live warheads, and provides target and photo/safety chase. It operates four highly modified T-38C and one C-12J aircraft equipped to support a wide variety of flight test operations.

- 746th Test Squadron

Also known as the Central Inertial and GPS Test Facility (CIGTF). The squadron was the DoD's designated lead test organization chartered to test and evaluate Global Positioning System (GPS) user equipment and integrated GPS based guidance and navigation systems. The 746 TS managed the tri-service GPS Test Center of Expertise (COE) composed of Army, Navy, and Air Force test agencies chartered to support GPS test and evaluation initiatives. In addition, CIGTF's inclusive ground, field, and flight-testing capabilities offer the customer a means to evaluate their guidance and navigation systems.

- 796th Test Support Squadron
- 846th Test Squadron - rocket sled tests to include:

High speed tests
Ejection seat tests
Supersonic track tests
Hypersonic tests
The squadron operates the Holloman High Speed Test Track (HHSTT) which simulates selected portions of the flight environment under accurately programmed and instrumented conditions. This capability fills the gap between laboratory investigations and full scale flight tests. The squadron is also DoD's "Center of Expertise" for all ejection seat testing and the lead facility for all supersonic tracks

- Det 1, 96th Test Group

Serves as a sponsor for all Air Force programs testing on White Sands Missile Range (WSMR). It assists users in preparing documentation for supporting services and obtaining WSMR logistic and support resources. In addition, this office acts as lead agent for scheduling all Air Force training and mission requirements for the 49th Fighter Wing, 96th Test Group, and weapon system program's use of WSMR airspace.

- Det 2, 96th Test Group

== Lineage ==
- Constituted as the 96th Test Group on 18 June 2012

Activated on 1 October 2012

=== Assignments ===
- 96th Test Wing, 1 October 2012 – 1 December 2016

=== Stations ===
- Holloman Air Force Base, New Mexico, 1 October 2012 – 2016

=== Components ===
- 586th Flight Test Squadron, 1 October 2012 – 1 Dec 2016.
- 746th Test Squadron, 1 October 2012 – c. 2016.
- 796th Test Support Squadron, 1 October 2012 – present
- 846th Test Squadron, 1 October 2012 – present
