= 46th Test Group =

46th Test Group

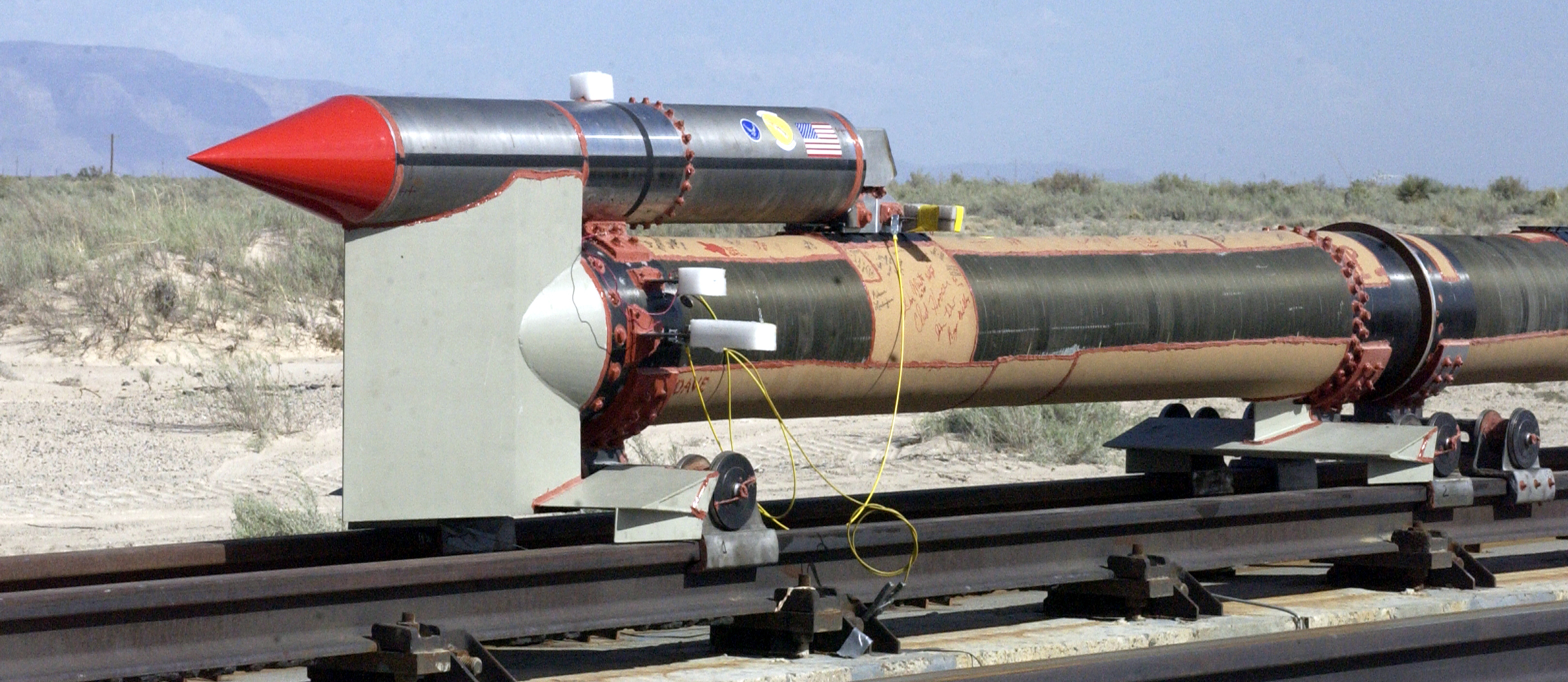
- Rocket on the Holloman High Speed Test Track
- Active: 1970–2012
- Disbanded: 18 July 2012
- Country: United States
- Branch: United States Air Force
- Role: Aerospace Research
- Part of: Air Force Materiel Command
- Decorations: Air Force Outstanding Unit Award

Insignia
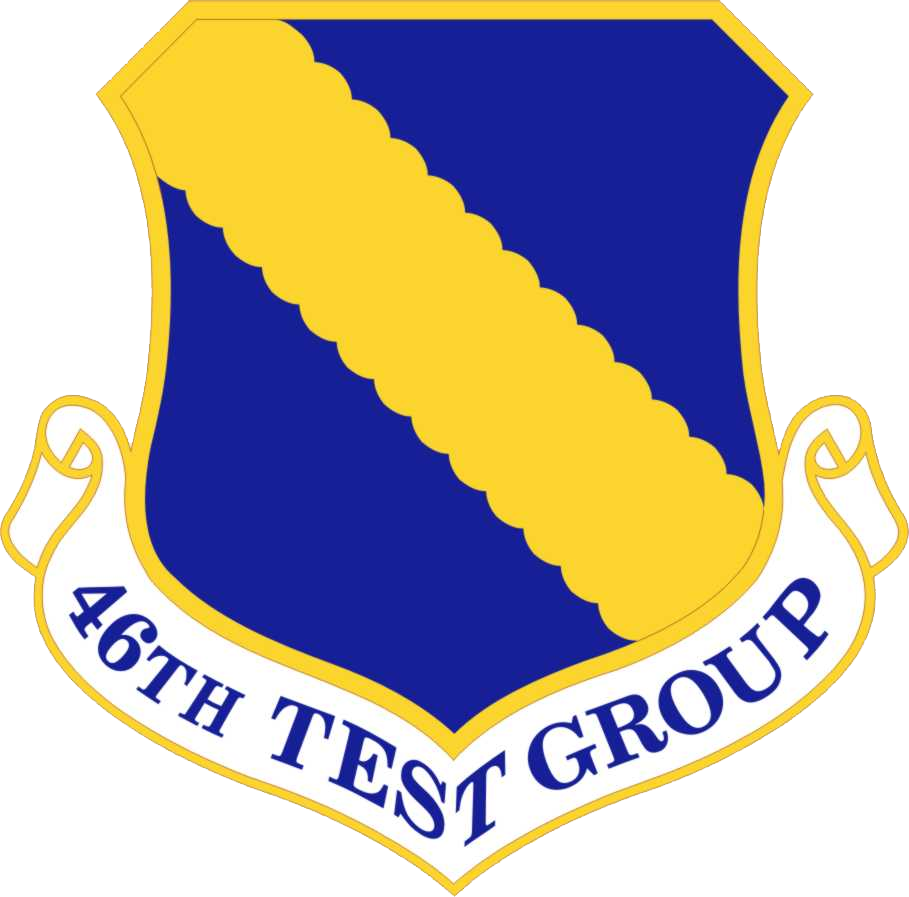
- 46th Test Group emblem (Note: The group uses the 46th Test Wing emblem with the group designation on the scroll while assigned to the wing. Air Force Instruction 84-105, Organizational Lineage, Honors and Heraldry, 19 March 2013, para 3.3.3)

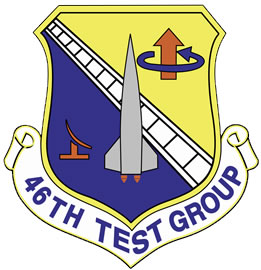
- 6585th Test Group emblem (Note: Approved for the 6585th Group. The 46th Group may continue to use this emblem if active and not assigned to the 46th Wing. Air Force Instruction 84-105, Organizational Lineage, Honors and Heraldry, 19 March 2013, para 3.3.3)

The 46th Test Group was a United States Air Force group active from 1992 to 2012. It was last active with the 46th Test Wing at Eglin Air Force Base, Florida. The 46th Test Group was stationed as a tenant unit at Holloman Air Force Base, New Mexico, throughout its existence. It was disbanded on 18 July 2012, and replaced by the 96th Test Group in an administrative reorganization.

== History ==
The Group served as the Air Force's liaison with the United States Army White Sands Missile Range (WSMR), liaising with the U.S. Army and Test Center organizations. The group provided test sponsorship for many Air Force test programs on WSMR. The group also scheduled airspace for all Air Force tests and Air Force tactical training on WSMR.

On 1 August 1970, per Air Force Systems Command Special Order G-94, the Air Force Missile Development Center at Holloman AFB was disbanded and the Tactical Air Command assumed host responsibilities for the facility. Associate units and programs transferred to other locations within Air Force Systems Command. The inactivation resulted in the loss of more than 450 military and 570 civilian positions.

The Test & Evaluation activities that remained were the Central Inertial Guidance Test Facility (CIGTF), the High Speed Test Track, the Radar Target Scatter Facility (RATSCAT), and the Target Drone Facility. These organizations were combined to form the nucleus of a Holloman AFB tenant organization, the 6585th Test Group

In 1976, the Air Force Special Weapons Center was disestablished, and the 6585th Test Group at Holloman became part of the 3246th Test Wing, Armament Development and Test Center at Eglin AFB, FL. The Group was inactivated on 30 September 1992 as part of a reorganization, with personnel and equipment being assigned to the new 46th Test Group at Holloman, upon activation it was transferred to the 6585th's personnel, equipment and mission.

It was inactivated as a result of an organizational realignment at Eglin AFB, being replaced at Holloman by the new 96th Test Group. In turn, the 96th Test Group was itself replaced by the 704th Test Group around 2016.

== Lineage ==
- Designated as the 6585th Test Group

Activated on 1 August 1970
Redesignated 46th Test Group on 1 October 1992
Inactivated on 18 July 2012

=== Assignments ===
- Air Force Special Weapons Center on 1 August 1970
- Armament Development and Test Center (later, Armament Division) on 1 October 1975
- 3246th Test Wing on 1 January 1984
- 46th Test Wing, between 1 October 1992 and 18 July 2012

== Components ==
- 46th Guidance Test Squadron (later 746th Test Squadron), 8 September 1993 – 18 July 2012

Also known as the Central Inertial Guidance Test Facility (CIGTF), the 746 TS is the DOD's designated Responsible Test Organization (RTO) chartered to test and evaluate GPS user equipment (UE) and integrated GPS based guidance and navigation systems. In support of GPS testing, the 746th TS also manages the tri-service GPS Test Center of Expertise (COE) composed of Army, Navy, and Air Force test agencies chartered to support GPS test and evaluation initiatives.

- 846th Test Squadron, 1 October 1994 – 18 July 2012

Also known as the Holloman High Speed Test Track (HHSTT), the 846 TS performed rocket testing on the aerospace test facility for a wide variety of test hardware in a near operational environment. Specific advantages are: the test items are recovered for post-run analysis; the sled provides sustained linear and dynamic acceleration and velocity with superimposed, tailored vibration; and the sled track provides extremely accurate test article positioning and time correlation. Repeated tests of the same test item provide an independent evaluation of modifications made during a development program.

- National Radar Cross Section Test Facility

The National Radar Cross Section Test Facility (NRTF) is the DoD facility for RCS testing. Formerly known as RATSCAT, which began measuring radar scattering in 1963, it comprises two complementary sites, Main site and RATSCAT Advanced Measurement System (RAMS). Assigned to the U.S. Air Force’s 781st Test Squadron, NRTF is located west of Holloman Air Force Base, New Mexico in a rolling gypsum region of WSMR. NRTF specializes in the RCS characterization of full-scale, aerodynamic vehicles and antenna radiation pattern development. Due to its remote, secure environment, it can also accommodate customers requiring specialized testing of developmental electronics systems. NRTF products directly support weapon system development programs, vulnerability assessment studies, and mission planning efforts throughout the DoD.

- 6586th Test Squadron (later 586th Test Squadron, 586th Flight Test Squadron), 1 August 1970 – 18 July 2012

Performed flight tests of the most advanced aircraft systems in the world. The squadron has aircraft parking and administration facilities to provide a high level of security to its customers. It owns and operates two highly modified AT-38B aircraft equipped to support a wide variety of flight test operations. Capabilities of the squadron’s AT-38Bs include: chaff, flares, GPS navigation and precision data recording and telemetry, ECM, Air Combat Maneuvering Instrumentation (ACMI) pods, and multiple format photographic coverage (including helmet-mounted video cameras). The squadron owns and operates a highly modified C-12J (Beech 1900 Airliner) with multiple antenna and pod configurations for guidance/navigation, avionics, and electronics testing. The 586 FLTS has access to both full-scale and sub-scale unmanned aerial targets as well as one of the world’s most elaborate ground impact ranges. The 586th Flight Test Squadron is the world’s leading authority on overland firings of the AMRAAM, the Air Force’s primary medium range air-to-air missile.

=== Aircraft ===
- AT-38 Talon, 1991–2012
- C-12, 1997–2012

== Notes ==
Notes

Citations
