= 3225th Drone Squadron =

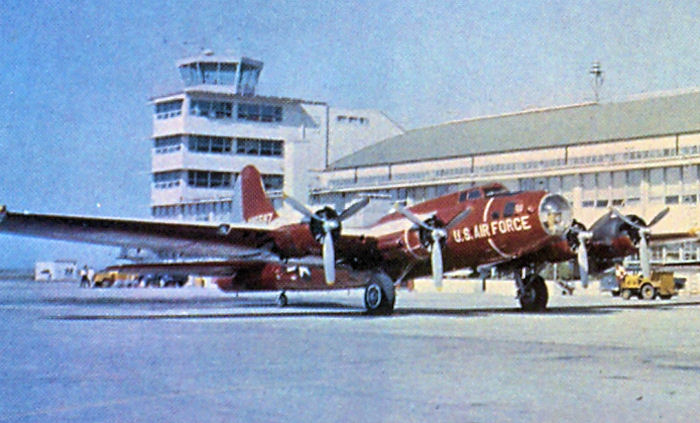
- Unidentified QB-17L Flying Fortress, 3225th Drone Squadron, Holloman AFB, New Mexico, 1959
- Active: 1953–1963
- Country: United States
- Branch: United States Air Force
- Role: Drone operations

The 3225th Drone Squadron is a discontinued United States Air Force unit. It was last active with the Air Force Missile Development Center, based at Holloman Air Force Base, New Mexico. It was discontinued on 25 October 1963.

== History ==
Organized as "Detachment 1", 3201st Air Base Support Squadron, on 26 April 1950, taking over mission of 2d Guided Missiles Squadron (GMS), 550th Guided Missiles Wing. Operated QB/DB-17 Flying Fortress drone/director aircraft drones as flying targets for the early Army Nike Ajax surface-to-air missile or for the Hughes Falcon air-to-air missiles being tested at White Sands Missile Range. Also supplied aerial targets as needed by the Air Force Missile Development Center.

Upgraded to squadron level in 1953. Began operating BQM-34A Firebee Drones in 1957 to provide remote-controlled target aircraft for Center. The squadron would also support test projects and provide land recovery for target drones. A notable moment in the squadron's history is that a Douglas/Long Beach DB-17P (Formerly B-17G-90-DL) 44-83684 flew the last operational mission by a USAF Flying Fortress on 6 August 1959.

Began operating Ryan Q2-C, the improved version of the first Firebee in 1960. It had more powerful engines, could climb faster and higher. Formally transferred to the Missile Development Center in 1961, operated Firebee drones and assisted in its development. Inactivated 1963 when program consolidated with Air Defense Command at Tyndall AFB, Florida.

=== Lineage ===
- Organized as 3225th Drone Squadron on 1 January 1953

Discontinued on 25 October 1963

=== Assignments ===
- 3205th Drone Group, 1 January 1953
- Air Proving Ground Center, 1 February 1961
- Air Force Missile Development Center, 1 March 1961 – 25 October 1963

=== Stations ===
- Holloman AFB, NM. 1 January 1953 – 25 October 1963

=== Aircraft ===
- DB-17P Flying Fortress (Director Aircraft)
- QB-17L Flying Fortress (Drone Aircraft)
- QB-17N Flying Fortress (Drone Aircraft)
- BQM-34A Firebee (Drone)
