= 586th Flight Test Squadron =

586th Flight Test Squadron

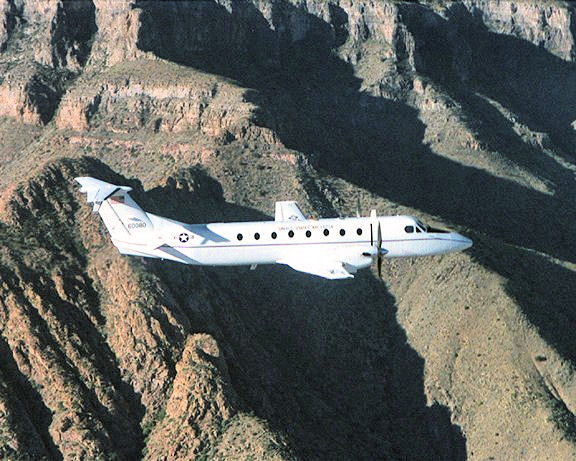
- 586th Flight Test Squadron C-12 Huron
- Active: 1943-1946; 1982-present
- Country: United States
- Branch: United States Air Force
- Role: Flight test
- Part of: Air Force Materiel Command
- Garrison/HQ: Holloman Air Force Base
- Engagements: European Theater of Operations
- Decorations: Distinguished Unit Citation; Air Force Meritorious Unit Award; Air Force Outstanding Unit Award; French Croix de Guerre w/ Palm

Insignia
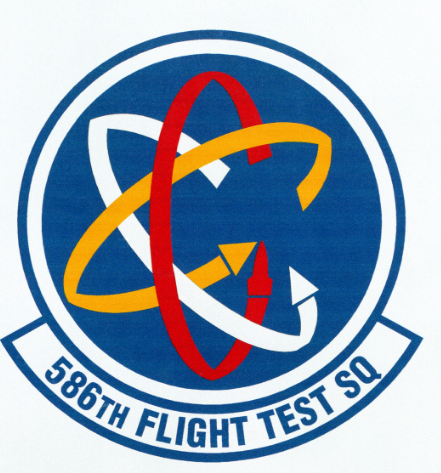
- 586th Flight Test Squadron emblem (Note: Approved 26 January 1996.)

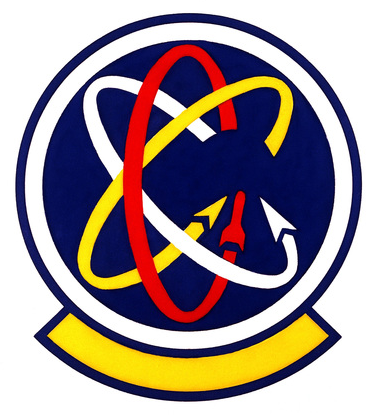
- 6586th Test Squadron emblem (Note: Approved 8 December 1983.)

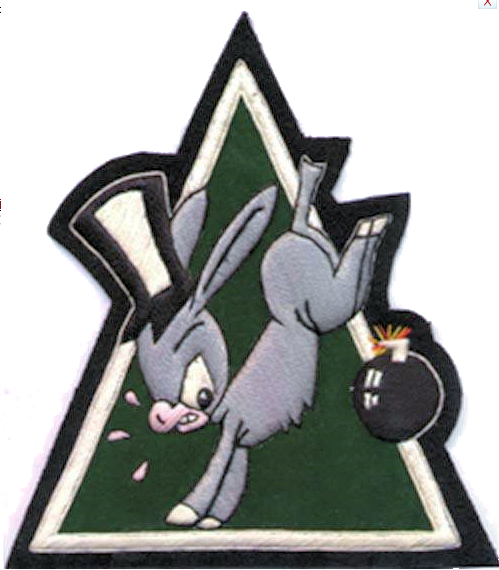
- 586th Bombardment Squadron emblem (Note: Approved 29 June 1943. Description: Over and through an isosceles triangle dark green, edged white, a caricatured tan donkey, face expressing anger and emitting three drops of perspiration proper, nose pink, and wearing a plug hat black, gray, and white, standing on forelegs and kicking a black fire bomb, fired proper, with the hind legs.)
- World War II fuselage code: H9

The 586th Flight Test Squadron is a United States Air Force unit, stationed at Holloman Air Force Base, New Mexico.

The squadron's first predecessor is the 586th Bombardment Squadron, a Martin B-26 Marauder unit that was organized and trained in the United States during World War II. It flew combat missions in the European Theater of Operations, where it earned a Distinguished Unit Citation and a French Croix de Guerre with Palm. After V-E Day, it served with the occupation forces in Germany until returning to the United States and inactivating at Bolling Field, District of Columbia on 31 March 1946.

Its second predecessor is the 6586th Test Squadron, which was organized in December 1982 to perform flight testing with a number of electronic systems. In 1992, the two squadrons were consolidated as the 586th Test Squadron.

== Mission ==
The squadron "plans, analyzes, coordinates and conducts flight tests of advanced weapons and avionics systems primarily on the White Sands Missile Range. It provides deployable operational support for test aircraft [operating from] Holloman Air Force Base. The squadron flight tests guidance systems, laser systems, air-to-air and air-to-ground systems, long-range and standoff weapons, live warheads, and provides target and photo/safety chase. It operates three highly modified Northrop AT-38B Talon and one Beechcraft C-12J Huron aircraft."

== History ==
=== World War II ===
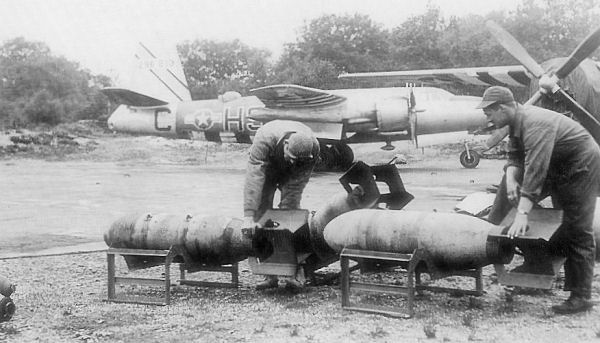
Fitting 500 pound bombs to load on Martin B-26B Marauder of the 586th (Note: The plane is Martin B-26-55-MA, serial 42-93159, fuselage code H9-C. This aircraft was shot down by anti-aircraft artillery on 22 March 1945. Baugher, Joe (7 March 2023). "1942 USAF Serial Numbers". Joe Baugher. Missing Air Crew Report (MACR) 13040)

==== Training in the United States ====
The squadron's first predecessor, the 586th Bombardment Squadron, was activated at MacDill Field, Florida as one of the original four squadrons of the 394th Bombardment Group. It began to train with the Martin B-26 Marauder, performing most of its training at Kellogg Field, Michigan. It departed for the European Theater of Operations (ETO) in mid-February 1944.

==== Combat in Europe ====
The squadron was established at RAF Boreham, which was to be its station until after D-Day, in mid March, and flew its first combat mission on 23 March, less than two weeks after its arrival in the ETO. It helped prepare for the invasion of Normandy by participating in Operation Crossbow, striking V-1 flying bomb and V-2 rocket launch sites. It also carried out attacks on marshalling yards, bridges, gun emplacements and airfields. Not all targets were near the intended invasion landing areas. For example, in April, the squadron participated in a heavy attack on the marshalling yard at Mechlen, Belgium. Later that month, it encountered particularly heavy flak in an attack on Heuringhem, in which the airplane leading the group formation received 264 holes. However, bombing results were not as accurate as desired, and the squadron was removed from operations for a week for additional training. On D-Day it attacked gun emplacements at Cherbourg, afterwards striking lines of communications, fuel storage sites and enemy strong points.

The squadron moved to RAF Holmsley South on 24 July, in a general move by the units of the 98th Bombardment Wing to bases closer to the invasion area, and on the following day supported Operation Cobra, the breakout at Saint Lo. Between 7 and 9 August, the squadron made five attacks on strongly defended targets in northern France. This operation resulted in the award of the Distinguished Unit Citation to the squadron. Later that month, the squadron moved to its first base on the continent, Tour-en-Bessin Airfield, in France. From this base, the 586th attacked strong points at Brest, France and later began attacking targets in Germany from its bases on the continent. During the Battle of the Bulge, the squadron attacked lines of communications to prevent reinforcements from reaching the attacking German forces. it participated in Operation Clarion, intended to destroy the remaining elements of the German transportation system. In addition to attacking transportation and storage facilities, toward the end of the war, the squadron dropped propaganda leaflets over occupied territory, which included the squadron's last combat mission.

==== Occupation and inactivation ====
Following V-E Day, the squadron moved to Kitzingen Airfield, Germany, where it became part of the Army of Occupation. In December, it began to transition into the Douglas A-26 Invader. However, most personnel were rotating home for separation from the military, and in February, the squadron was transferred on paper to Bolling Field, District of Columbia and was inactivated there at the end of March.

=== Test operations ===
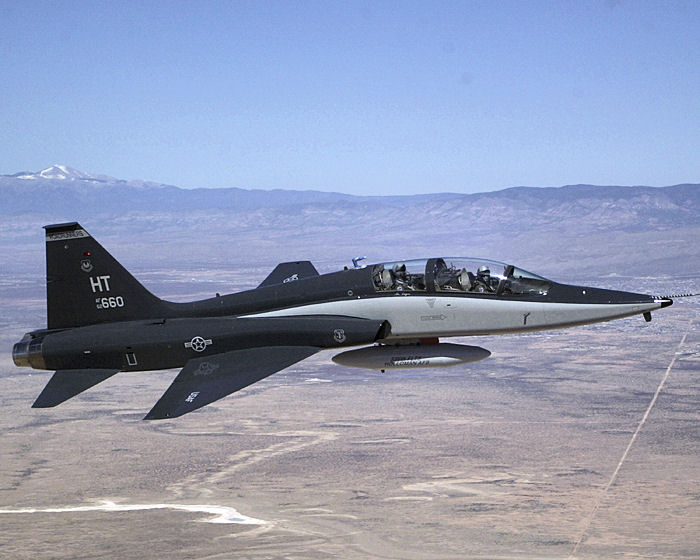
AT-38B of the 586th Test Squadron

The second predecessor of the squadron was activated at Holloman Air Force Base in December 1982 as the 6586th Test Squadron. It provided operational and maintenance support for all Department of Defense (DOD) test aircraft staging out of Holloman Air Force Base from 1982 until 1990. Starting in 1991, it flew developmental test and evaluation missions and has supported DOD test flights on the White Sands Missile Range.

The squadron operates three AT-38B and one C-12J aircraft. The T-38s are modified for test, test support, target, and photo and safety chase missions. They are equipped with chaff, flares, Global Positioning System (GPS) navigation, precision data recording and telemetry and electronic countermeasures. They are equipped with an internal fighter instrumentation and navigation system which uses inertial navigation and GPS inputs. They can simulate towed targets, threat and cruise missiles. They have air combat maneuvering Instrumentation pods, and multiple format photographic capability. For specialized tests, test equipment can be mounted and installed in place of the rear ejection seat or externally in a pod. The centerline pylon can also carry operational stores.

The C-12J, a modified Beech 1900C, is a low cost testbed aircraft used for evaluating navigation and guidance components and systems. It also provides slow speed photo and safety chase. Its onboard time space position instrumentation provides a reference for systems under test. Electrical power is available for onboard test equipment. It can carry up to four fully powered, independent test racks with an operator for each rack. Each test rack is configurable with customer equipment. Antenna modifications include 2 controlled and 3 fixed Radiated Pattern Antennas, a C Band Beacon antenna, and a dedicated ultra high frequency antenna for test communication radio. It can deploy for off-station requirements.

In October 1992, the two squadrons were consolidated as the 586th Test Squadron. The squadron was renamed in 1994 as a flight test unit.

== Lineage ==
586th Bombardment Squadron

- Constituted as the 586th Bombardment Squadron (Medium) on 15 February 1943

Activated on 5 March 1943
Redesignated 586th Bombardment Squadron, Medium on 9 October 1944
Redesignated 586th Bombardment Squadron, Light on 3 December 1945
Inactivated on 31 March 1946

- Consolidated with the 6586th Test Squadron on 1 October 1982

586th Test Squadron

- Designated as the 6586th Test Squadron on 15 December 1982 and activated
- Consolidated with the 586th Bombardment Squadron and redesignated 586th Test Squadron on 1 October 1992

Redesignated 586th Flight Test Squadron on 15 March 1994

=== Assignments ===
- 394th Bombardment Group, 5 March 1943 - 31 March 1946
- 6585th Test Group (later 46th Test Group), 15 December 1982
- 96th Test Group, 1 October 2012
- 704th Test Group, 1 December 2016 – present

=== Stations ===
- MacDill Field, Florida, 5 March 1943
- Ardmore Army Air Field, Oklahoma, 12 July 1943
- Kellogg Field, Michigan, 19 August 1943 – 15 February 1944
- RAF Boreham (AAF-161), England c. 11 March 1944
- RAF Holmsley South (AAF-455), England, 24 July 1944
- Tour-en-Bessin Airfield (A-13), France, 25 August 1944
- Orleans/Bricy Airfield (A-50), France, 18 September 1944
- Cambrai/Niergnies Airfield (A-74), France, 8 October 1944
- Venlo Airfield (Y-55), Netherlands, 2 May 1945
- AAF Station Kitzingen (R-6), Germany, September 1945 – 15 February 1946
- Bolling Field, District of Columbia, 15 February 1946 – 31 March 1946
- Holloman Air Force Base, New Mexico, 15 Dec 1982 – present

=== Aircraft ===
- Martin B-26 Marauder, 1943-1945
- Douglas A-26 Invader, 1945-1946
- Northrop AT-38 Talon, 1991–present
- Beechcraft C-12J Huron, 1997–present

=== Awards and campaigns ===
Award streamer	Award	Dates	Notes
	Distinguished Unit Citation	7–9 August 1944	France, 586th Bombardment Squadron
	Air Force Meritorious Unit Award	30 April 2008 – 1 May 2009	586th Flight Test Squadron
	Air Force Outstanding Unit Award	1 January 1984 – 31 December 1985	6586th Test Squadron
	Air Force Outstanding Unit Award	1 January 1987 – 31 December 1987	6586th Test Squadron
	Air Force Outstanding Unit Award	1 January 1991 – 31 December 1992	6586th Test Squadron (later 586th Test Squadron)
	Air Force Outstanding Unit Award	1 January 1993 – 31 December 1993	586th Test Squadron
	Air Force Outstanding Unit Award	1 January 1994 – 31 December 1994	586th Test Squadron (later 586th Flight Test Squadron)
	Air Force Outstanding Unit Award	1 January 1995 – 31 December 1995	586th Flight Test Squadron
	Air Force Outstanding Unit Award	1 January 1997 – 31 December 1997	586th Flight Test Squadron
	Air Force Outstanding Unit Award	1 January 1998 – 31 December 1999	586th Flight Test Squadron
	Air Force Outstanding Unit Award	1 January 2000 – 31 December 2000	586th Flight Test Squadron
	Air Force Outstanding Unit Award	1 January 2001 – 31 December 2001	586th Flight Test Squadron
	Air Force Outstanding Unit Award	1 January 2002 – 31 December 2002	586th Flight Test Squadron
	Air Force Outstanding Unit Award	1 January 2003 – 31 December 2003	586th Flight Test Squadron
	Air Force Outstanding Unit Award	1 January 2004 – 31 December 2004	586th Flight Test Squadron
	Air Force Outstanding Unit Award	1 January 2005 – 31 December 2005	586th Flight Test Squadron
	Air Force Outstanding Unit Award	1 January 2006 – 31 December 2006	586th Flight Test Squadron
	Air Force Outstanding Unit Award	1 January 2008 – 31 December 2008	586th Flight Test Squadron
	Air Force Outstanding Unit Award	1 January 2009 – 31 December 2009	586th Flight Test Squadron
	Air Force Outstanding Unit Award	1 January 2010 – 31 December 2010	586th Flight Test Squadron
	Air Force Outstanding Unit Award	1 January 2011 – 31 December 2011	586th Flight Test Squadron
	Air Force Outstanding Unit Award	1 June 2011 – 31 May 2013	586th Flight Test Squadron
	Air Force Outstanding Unit Award	1 January 2015 – 31 December 2015	586th Flight Test Squadron
	Air Force Outstanding Unit Award	1 June 2015 – 31 May 2016	586th Flight Test Squadron
	French Croix de Guerre with Palm	6 June – 14 September 1944	586th Bombardment Squadron

Campaign Streamer	Campaign	Dates	Notes
	Air Offensive, Europe	11 March 1944 – 5 June 1944	586th Bombardment Squadron
	Normandy	6 June 1944 – 24 July 1944	586th Bombardment Squadron
	Northern France	25 July 1944 – 14 September 1944	586th Bombardment Squadron
	Rhineland	15 September 1944 – 21 March 1945	586th Bombardment Squadron
	Ardennes-Alsace	16 December 1944 – 25 January 1945	586th Bombardment Squadron
	Central Europe	22 March 1944 – 21 May 1945	586th Bombardment Squadron
