= Rocket sled =

Test platform pushed by rockets along a track

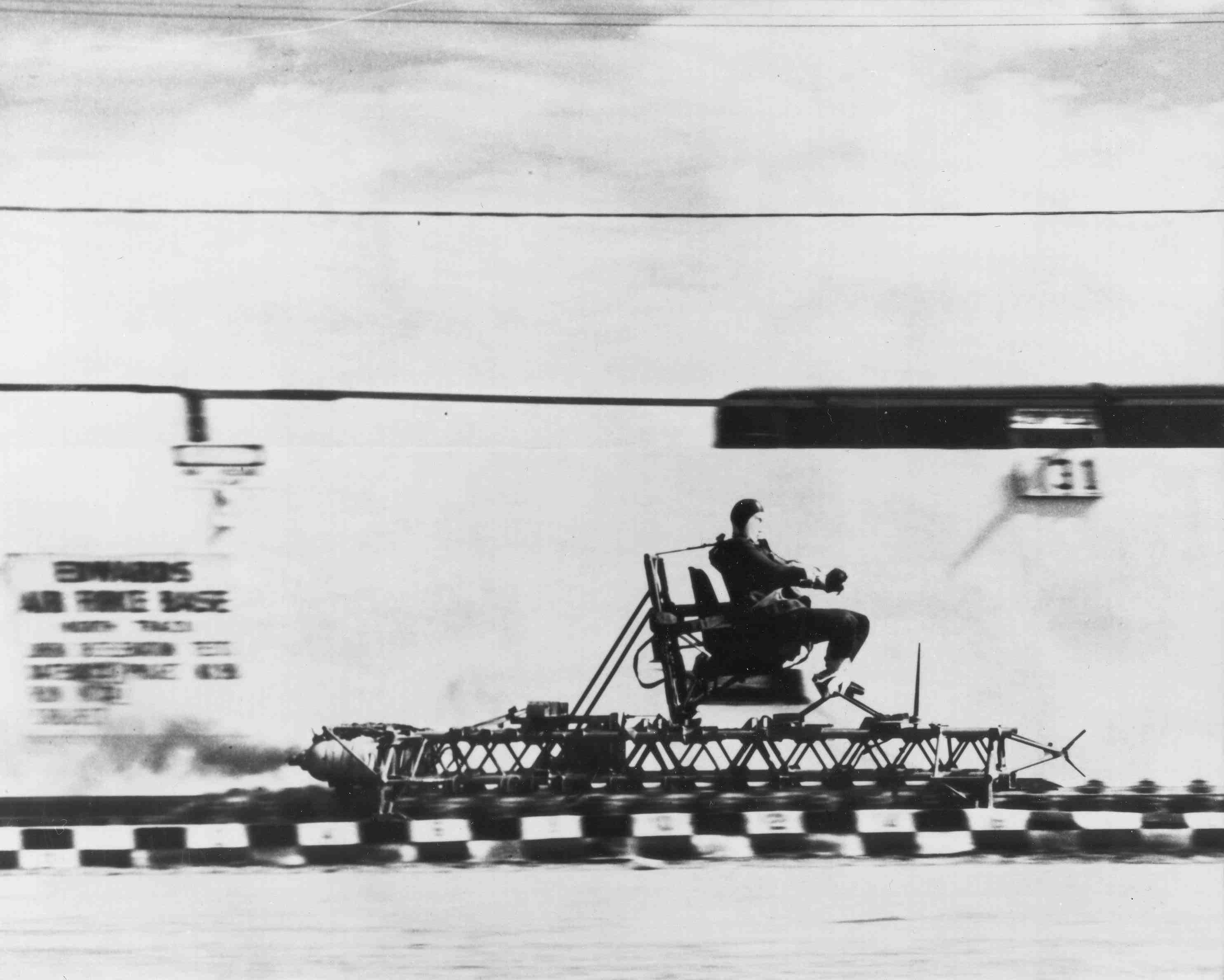
Lt. Col. John P. Stapp rides the rocket sled at Edwards Air Force Base

A rocket sled is a test platform that slides along a track (e.g. set of rails), propelled by rockets.

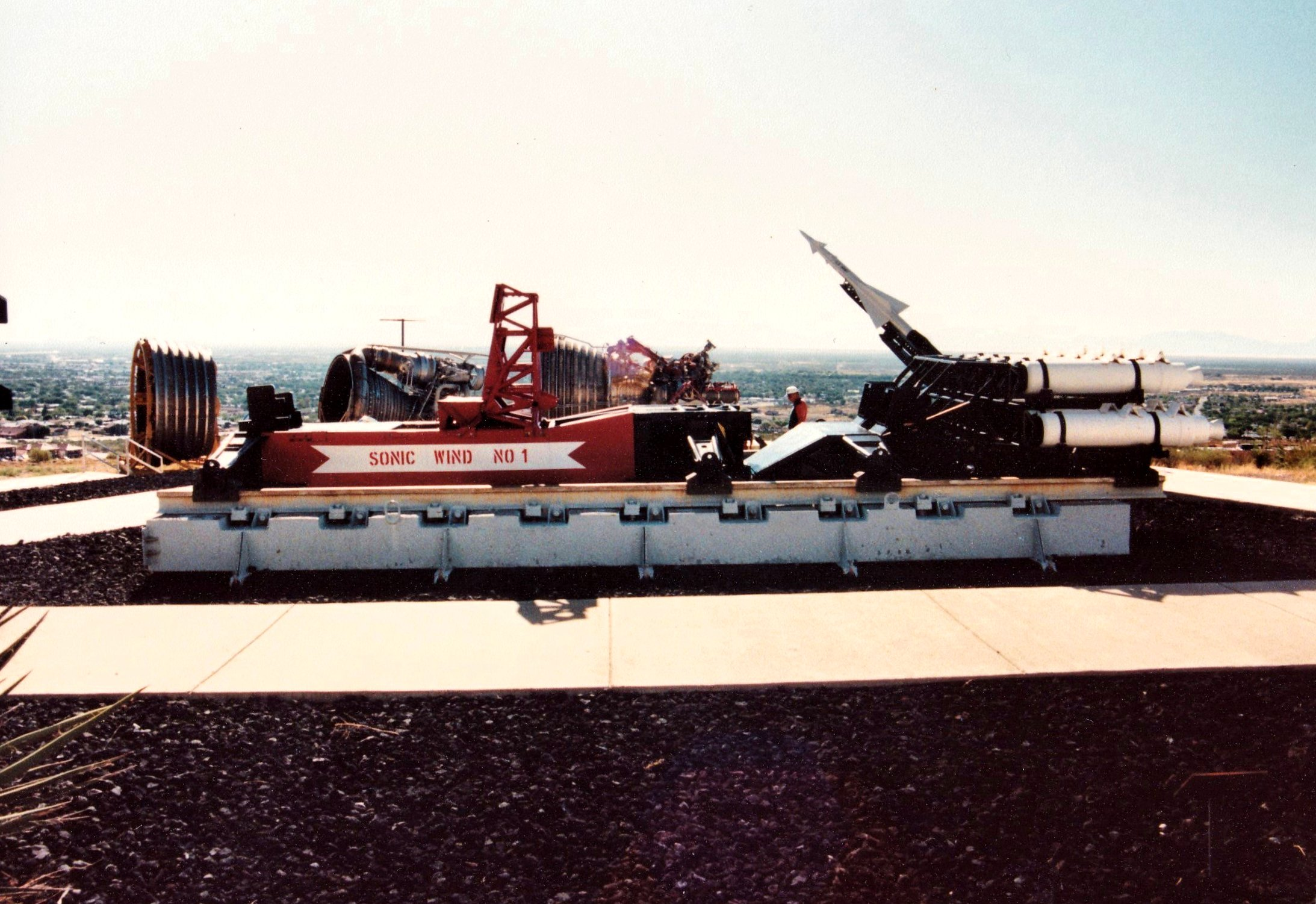
Sonic Wind No 1. This rocket sled was ridden by John Paul Stapp in the 1950s.

A rocket sled differs from a rocket car in not using wheels; at high speeds wheels would spin to pieces due to the extreme centrifugal forces. Apart from rare examples running on snow or ice (such as Max Valier's RAK BOBs of the late 1920s and Harry Bull's BR-1 in 1931), most rocket sleds run on a track. Although some rocket sleds ride on single beams or rails, most use a pair of rails. Standard gauge (1.435 m / 56.5 in) is common but sled tracks of narrower or wider gauge also exist. The rail cross-section profile is usually that of a Vignoles rail, commonly used for railroads. Sliding pads, called "slippers", are curved around the head of the rails to prevent the sled from flying off the track. Air cushions and magnetic levitation have also been used as alternatives, with potential benefits including reduced sled vibration.

A rocket sled holds the land-based speed record for a vehicle, at Mach 8.5.

== Usage ==
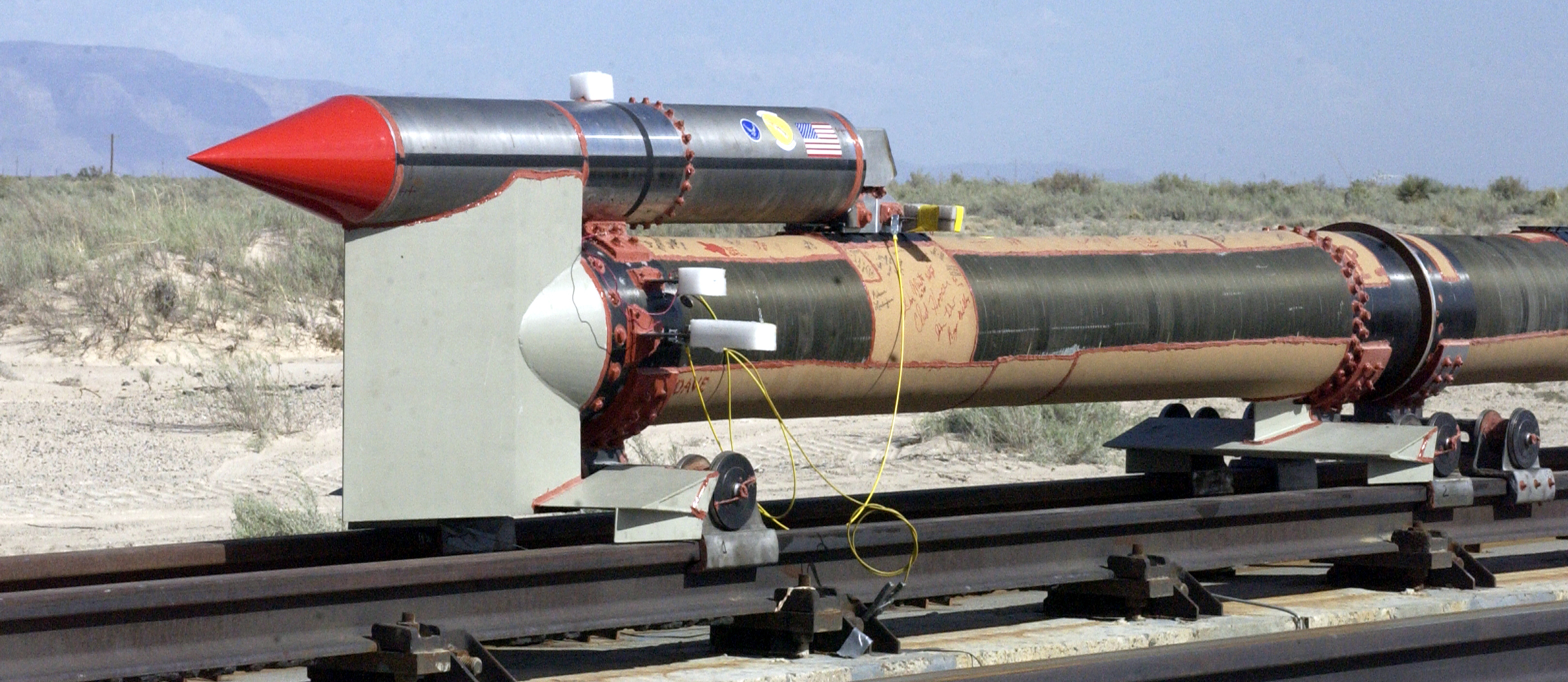
The vehicle that achieved Mach 8.5

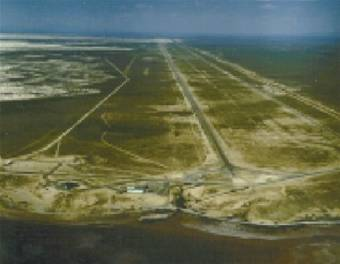
The Holloman Air Force Base track

Rocket sleds were used extensively early in the Cold War to accelerate equipment considered too experimental (hazardous) for testing directly in piloted aircraft. The equipment to be tested under high acceleration or high airspeed conditions was installed along with appropriate instrumentation, data recording and telemetry equipment on the sled. The sled was then accelerated according to the experiment's design requirements for data collection along a length of isolated, precisely level and straight test track. Testing ejection seat systems and technology prior to their use in experimental or operational aircraft was a common application of the rocket sled at Holloman Air Force Base. Perhaps the most famous, the tracks at Edwards Air Force Base were used to test missiles, supersonic ejection seats, aircraft shapes and the effects of acceleration and deceleration on humans. The rocket sled track at Edwards Air Force Base was dismantled and used to extend the track at Holloman Air Force Base, taking it to almost 10 miles (16 km) in length.

Unmanned rocket sleds continue to be used to test missile components without requiring costly live missile launches. A world speed record of Mach 8.5 (6,416 mph / 10,325 km/h) was achieved by a four-stage rocket sled at Holloman Air Force Base on April 30, 2003, the highest speed ever attained by a land vehicle.

Murphy's law first received public attention during a press conference about rocket sled testing.

== Rocket sled tracks ==
Name	Location	Co-ordinates	Country	Length	Gauge	Rail Type	Welded/ Segmented	Opened	Renovated	Closed	Notes
Holloman High Speed Test Track (HHSTT) Rails 1&2	Holloman AFB, Alamogordo, NM	32.8881°N 106.1502°W	USA	50,971 ft (15.536 km)	84 in (2.1 m)	171	Welded	1950	1956, 1957, 1974, 2000, 2002		Runs North-South
Supersonic Naval Ordnance Research Track (SNORT)	NAWC-WD Naval Air Weapons Station, China Lake, CA	35.7047°N 117.7408°W	USA	21,550 ft (6.568 km)	56.5 in (1.435 m)	171	Welded	1953	2006		North-South
Holloman High Speed Test Track (HHSTT) Rail 3	Holloman AFB, Alamogordo, NM	32.9687°N 106.15688°W	USA	20,200 ft (6.157 km)	26.3 in (0.67 m)	171	Welded	1974			North-South
Extended High-Speed Rocket Sled Track	Edwards AFB, Edwards, CA	34.81485°N 117.9084°W	USA	20,000 ft (6.096 km)	56.5 in (1.435 m)	171	Welded	1949	1959	1963	Also known as South Base Sled Track (SBST). Rails used to lengthen HHSTT
Rail Track Rocket Sled Test Facility	Terminal Ballistics Research Laboratory Range, Ramgarh, Haryana	30.641470°N 76.922399°E	India	3.8 km (12,467 ft)	0.7–4.86 m (28–191 in)			1988	2014		5 rails North/South
Supersonic Military Air Research Track (SMART)	Aircraft Interior Products Propulsion Systems, Hurricane Mesa, UT	37.2384°N 113.22037°W	USA	12,000 ft (3.658 km)	56.5 in (1.435 m)	105	Welded	1955		1961*	*Now Privately Owned & Operational. North-South
Sandia 2	Technical Area III, Kirtland AFB, Albuquerque, NM	34.9992°N 106.55646°W	USA	10,000 ft (3.048 km)	0.56 m (22 in)			1966	1985		North-South
Rocket rail track 3500, FKP GkNIPAS	Beloozyorsky	55.48677°N 38.49836°E	Russia	3.5 km (11,480 ft)			Segmented		2014		Formerly RD-2500. Used by Zvezda for ejection seat testing
RT-2650, FKP NII Geodeziya	Krasnoarmeysk	56.11901°N 38.20345°E	Russia	2,650 m (8,694 ft)		R-75		1956	1984		
TsKP MIK of RFNC-VNIIEF	Sarov	54.8212°N 43.2530°E	Russia	3.0 km (9,843 ft)							
B-4 Transonic Test Track	NAWC-WD Naval Air Weapons Station, China Lake, CA	35.7063°N 117.80516°W	USA	6,800 ft (2,073 m)	56.5 in (1.435 m)	75	Welded	1940			
Martin-Baker Langford Lodge	Langford Lodge, Northern Ireland	54.62581°N 6.29895°W	UK	6,200 ft (1,890 m)	30 in (0.762 m)	80		1971			Privately Owned & Operated by Martin-Baker
Pendine Long Test Track (LTT)	QinetiQ, Pendine, Wales	51.73801°N 4.49680°W	UK	1,500 m (4,921 ft)	12 in (0.305 m)	103		1956			
Centre D'essais Des Landes Single Rail R1	Biscarrosse	44.34641°N 1.23640°W	France	2.0 km (6,562 ft)	Monorail	Square Beam	Segmented	1968	1974, ?		(Foundation for 2nd rail in place)
G-4 Exterior and Terminal Ballistics Test Track	NAWC-WD Naval Air Weapons Station, China Lake, CA	35.86793°N 117.73071°W	USA	3,000 ft (914 m)	33.875 in (0.860 m)	171	Welded	1954			
ETTC KEMTF sled track	Test Area C-74, Eglin AFB, Ft. Walton Beach, FL	30.68503°N 86.32713°W	USA	2,000 ft (610 m)	56.5 in (1.435 m)	171	Welded	1956			
Sandia 1	Technical Area III, Kirtland AFB, Albuquerque, NM	34.98955°N 106.54407°W	USA	2,000 ft (610 m)	56.5 in (1.435 m)			1951			North-South
Edwards North Base Track "G-Whiz"	Edwards AFB, Edwards, CA	34.99641°N 117.85798°W	USA	2,000 ft (610 m)			Welded	1944		1953	Also known as North Base Sled Track (NBST). East-West
Redstone Test Center Sled Track 1	Test Area 1, Redstone Arsenal, AL	34.60375°N 86.64504°W	USA	1,900 ft (579 m)	Monorail			1956			Formerly Redstone Technical Test Center
Pendine Impact Test Track	QinetiQ, Pendine, Wales	51.74125°N 4.50728°W	UK	400 m (1,312 ft)	56.5 in (1.435 m)						
Centre D'essais Des Landes Single Rail R2	Biscarrosse	44.35312°N 1.23039°W	France	400 m (1,312 ft)	0.60 m (24 in)	Square Beam	Segmented	1967			Former HB3 track, moved from CIEES Colomb-Béchar, Algeria
Redstone Test Center Sled Track 2	Test Area 1, Redstone Arsenal, AL	34.60173°N 86.63935°W	USA	1,200 ft (366 m)	Monorail						Formerly Redstone Technical Test Center
New Mexico Tech/EMRTC Sled Track	Socorro, NM	34.02348°N 106.97819°W	USA	1,000 ft (305 m)	Monorail	171					Privately owned & operated. North-South
Pendine Short Test Track (STT)	QinetiQ, Pendine, Wales	51.74375°N 4.50908°W	UK	200 m (656 ft)							
General Dynamics Ordnance and Tactical Systems	Rock Hill, FL	30.61492°N 86.09640°W	USA	656 ft (200 m)		I-Beam					Privately Owned & Operated
Alkantpan Rocket Sled Range	Alkantpan Test Range, Copperton, Northern Cape	29.94715°S 22.22665°E	South Africa	200 m (656 ft)	0.5 m (19.7 in)	Single or Double I-beam	Segmented	1985	1999		Runs East to West Subsonic and supersonic testing
Holloman Maglev Track	Holloman AFB, Alamogordo, NM	33.01975°N 106.16086°W	USA	2,100 ft (640 m)							North-South
Germany			Germany			I-Beam					
Bundeswehr WTD 91 rocket sled track	Meppen	52.8631°N 7.4084°E	Germany	830 m (2,723 ft)							
AVIC ALI track	Xiangyang	32.3939°N 112.1386°E	China	6.0 km (19,685 ft)	1.435 m (56.5 in)		Welded	1993	2006		Also known as XB High Accuracy Rocket Sled Test Track.
Muroran Institute of Technology APReC HSTT	Shiraoi	42.5358°N 141.2558°E	Japan	300 m (984 ft)	1.435 m (56.5 in)			2009			
Muroran Institute of Technology APReC SSTT	Shiraoi	42.5357°N 141.2552°E	Japan	100 m (328 ft)	0.128 m (5.04 in)			2008			
TÜBİTAK SAGE HABRAS	Karapınar	37.6212°N 33.4634°E	Turkey	2.0 km (6,562 ft)				2017			

Other former rocket sled tracks include those at the following locations:

- Peenemünde, Germany (V-1 launch ramp)
- Base B1, Colomb-Béchar, Algeria (HB3 track (330 m) of CIEES, built by Hotchkiss-Brandt)
- PISQ, Salto di Quirra, Sardinia, Italy (660-ft supersonic sled track with 8° inclination)
- Satory, France
- Istres-Le Tubé Air Base, France (used by René Leduc for the SE 1910)
- Cazaux Air Base, France (HB1 (200 m) and HB2 (600 m) tracks of the DGA Centre d'essais en vol, built by Hotchkiss-Brandt)
- Aberdeen Proving Ground, Maryland, USA
- Institute of Aviation Medicine, Farnborough, UK

== See also ==
- Index of aviation articles
- Land speed record for railed vehicles
- Land speed record
- List of vehicle speed records
- Rocket sled launch
