= Holloman High Speed Test Track =

Aerospace ground test facility in New Mexico, U.S.

- Part of Holloman Air Force Base
- Near Alamogordo, New Mexico in the United States
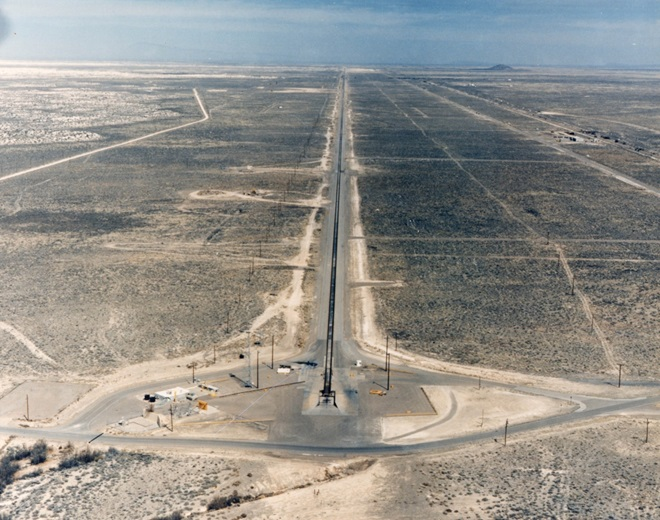
- A view of the Holloman High Speed Test Track, looking from south to north

Site information
- Type: Military test facility
- Owner: Department of War
- Operator: US Air Force
- Controlled by: Air Force Materiel Command
- Condition: Operational
- Website: Official website

Location
- Location within New Mexico Location within the United States
- Coordinates: 32°53′5.51″N 106°8′59.76″W
- Length: 50,971 feet (15,536 m)

Site history
- Built: 1949
- In use: 1949 – present
- Events: Rocket sled speed record (2003)

Garrison information
- Occupants: 846th Test Squadron

The Holloman High Speed Test Track (HHSTT) is a United States Department of War/Air Force aerospace ground test facility located at Holloman Air Force Base in south-central New Mexico. It is adjacent to the White Sands Missile Range and is operated by the 846th Test Squadron of the 704th Test Group of the Arnold Engineering Development Complex at Arnold Air Force Base.

The Test Track provides its services to a wide variety of American defense and governmental agencies such as the Air Force, Army, Navy, and the Missile Defense Agency, as well as America's allies.

== Mission ==
The HHSTT's mission is to provide a cost-effective, realistic, usable test environment for the entire acquisition community, including: the DOD, other government agencies, contractors, and foreign governments. As a ground-based test facility, the HHSTT provides a test environment for high-speed weapons, systems, and components. Full-scale flight tests tend to be more expensive than sled testing and present fewer opportunities to recover the test article for post-test evaluation.

== History ==
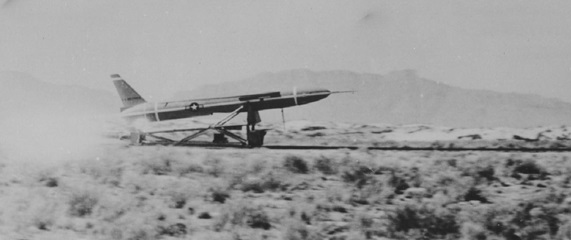
N-25 Snark on the Holloman Track, c. 1950.

The HHSTT was originally 3,350 ft (1,020 m) long when initial construction was completed in August 1949. The first test performed at the HHSTT was the launching of the Northrop N-25 Snark in 1950, but soon included human tolerance testing under the command of Colonel John P. Stapp. Col. Stapp was the last human test subject to ride the rocket-powered sleds at the HHSTT in December 1954. The track was lengthened to 5,000 ft (1,500 m) in 1956, followed by another extension to 35,000 ft (11,000 m) in 1957.

The next major track extension occurred in 1974 when the rails from the Edwards Air Force Base test track were shipped to Holloman and added to the existing tracks to give a new total length of 50,771 ft (15,475 m). During this upgrade, a third rail, approximately 15,000 ft (4,600 m), was added for high-speed, narrow-gauge sleds. In 2000, pulldown extensions of 149 ft (45 m) were added to the north end of each rail, bringing the two primary rails to 50,917 feet (15,520 m).

The last major upgrade to the primary rail system occurred in 2002, when the narrow-gauge track was lengthened to 20,379 ft (6,212 m). The HHSTT currently holds the world land speed record for rocket sleds set in April 2003, at Mach 8.6, or 9,465 feet per second (2,885 meters per second), or 6,453 miles per hour (10,380 kilometres per hour).

== Capabilities ==
As of April 2014, over 12,400 sled tests have been performed at the HHSTT. The first sled tests were performed in 1950; the facility has been in continuous operation since. The HHSTT is unusual within the DoD Test and Evaluation community because it has organic management, engineering, fabrication, and test-operation capabilities in one location. This ability to provide a "one-stop-shop" reduces test costs and schedule issues associated with geographically separated project functions.

A wide variety of tests have been performed at the HHSTT, including aircraft crew-escape systems, rain and particle erosion tests, impact testing, weapons dispense testing, electronic warfare, guidance system testing, and a wide array of aerodynamic tests.

Because of the HHSTT's location on a military reservation in a sparsely populated area, tests may be performed in a secure environment. These large areas of open space may also be used to test items that are explosive, ballistic, or otherwise hazardous.

== Facilities ==
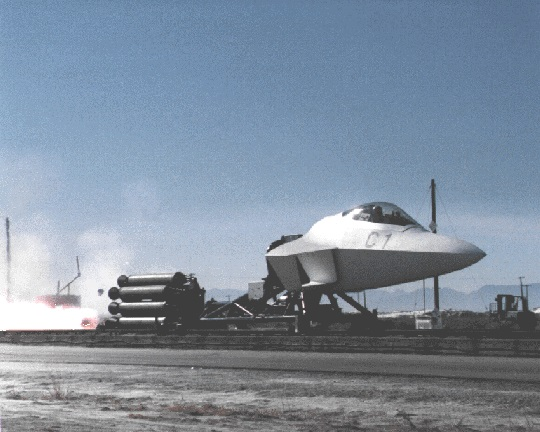
A F-22 forebody on a MASE sled at Holloman Air Force Base.

The most prominent feature of the facility is the rail system (similar in appearance to railroad tracks) used to launch rocket-powered test vehicles known as "sleds". The rail system is located just east of the White Sands National Park, and consists of a concrete foundation known as the girder that supports the two primary rails and a single tertiary rail. The westernmost rail is known as "A rail", followed by the adjacent "B rail" and "C rail". The alignment of the rails is nearly north–south. All three rails are fabricated from heavy-duty crane rail (171 pounds per yard or 85 kilograms per meter) and are maintained to an alignment of no more than 0.025 inches (0.64 mm) deviation from a nominal reference line between rail tiedowns.

A and B rails constitute the primary rails and are 50,917 feet (15,520 m) long. C rail, located at the north end of the track facility, is 20,379 feet (6,212 m) long. A and B rails are spaced 84 inches (210 cm), center to center, while C rail is spaced 26.3 inches (67 cm) to the east of B rail. Despite the simple appearance of the setup, the tracks constitute the straightest system of track ever laid. Rails A, B, and C are continuously welded and pre-stressed to be under tension at temperatures below 120 °F (49 °C).

Within the HHSTT infrastructure, there is a 6,000-foot (1,800 m) rainfield that is used to study the erosive effects caused by the impact of raindrops on material samples or components of weapon systems carried on rocket sleds. The rainfield system has been characterized for droplet size distribution and can simulate various combinations of rain environments from light rain to heavy rain, and produce flight conditions ranging from subsonic to hypersonic. This capability is used both for material development (usually involving systematic testing of material samples) and for qualifying flight hardware.

A separate system is currently under construction to support magnetic levitation, or maglev, sled development. The reason for this system is to produce flight-like vibration environments that can not be achieved on the main steel rail track. This system performed its first test in 2012 and continues to be operational.

Other facilities at the HHSTT include fabrication shops, project management and engineering buildings, munitions storage buildings, and heavy equipment staging areas.

== Data collection ==
Electronic data, which include test timing, vehicle position, velocity, and acceleration, are routinely collected at the HHSTT. These data are captured by various means, including Doppler radar, optical beam interrupter blades, breakwire installations and magnetic sensors, and a wide variety of component sensors to collect specialized data such as acceleration forces, strain, temperature, etc.

The data are collected with a variety of onboard data acquisition systems or telemetered for post-test analysis. Additionally, world-class technical imagery, including high-speed digital images, is available for customers to examine the status of their payloads. Track personnel use the same imagery to determine the status of the sled vehicle during tests. All data can be post-processed and merged using a common time reference to verify the accuracy of the data, and to produce a unified data product.

Optical imagery is captured with high-speed digital cameras.

Local meteorological data (e.g., temperature and barometric pressure) are also collected for each test for the calculation of Mach number or knots equivalent air speed as desired by the test customer.
