= 3246th Test Wing =

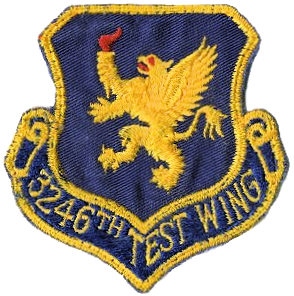
- 3246th Test Wing – Emblem
- Active: 1970–1992
- Country: United States
- Branch: United States Air Force
- Role: Testing
- Motto(s): "Proof by Test"

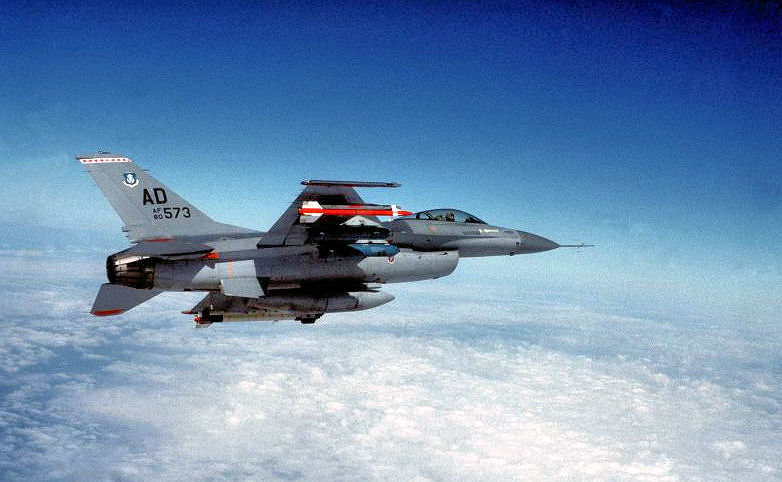
F-16A block 15, 80-0573, from the 3247th Test Squadron, armed with an AIM-9 Sidewinder missile and a cluster weapon in flight on 12 May 1986. Aircraft now on display at Air Force Armament Museum, Eglin AFB, FL.

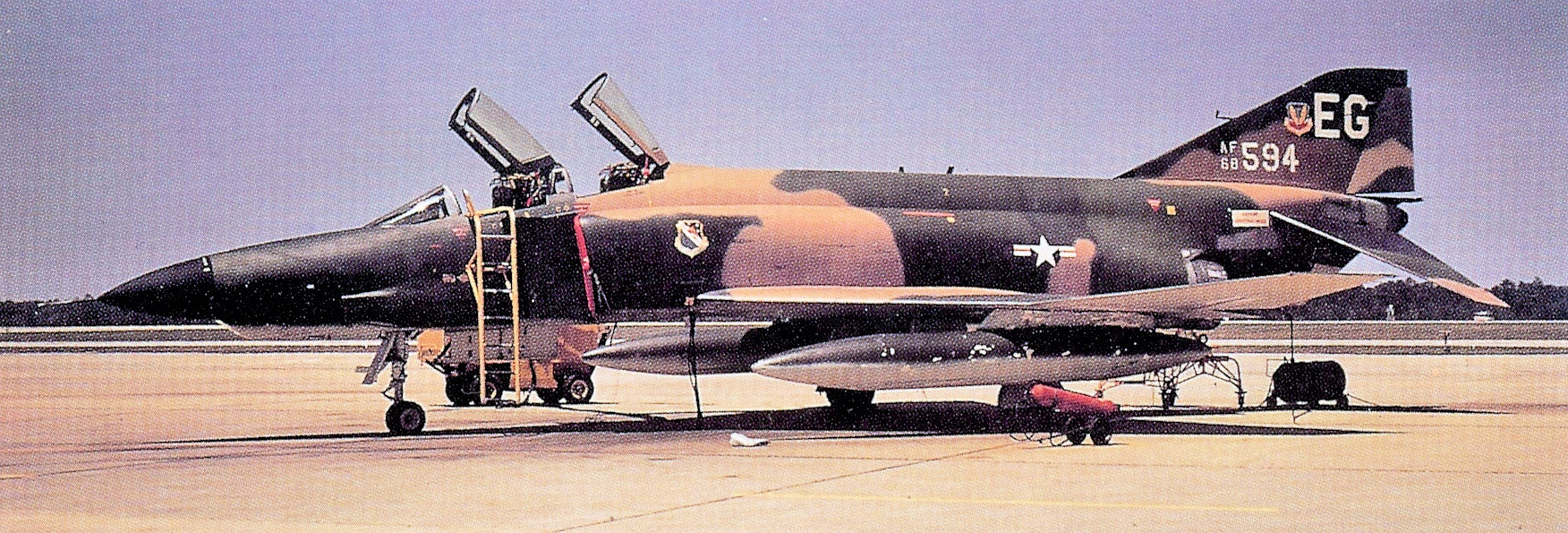
McDonnell Douglas RF-4C-40-MC Phantom II, 68-0594, 3247th Test Squadron, Eglin AFB, Florida, in Vietnam-era camouflage.

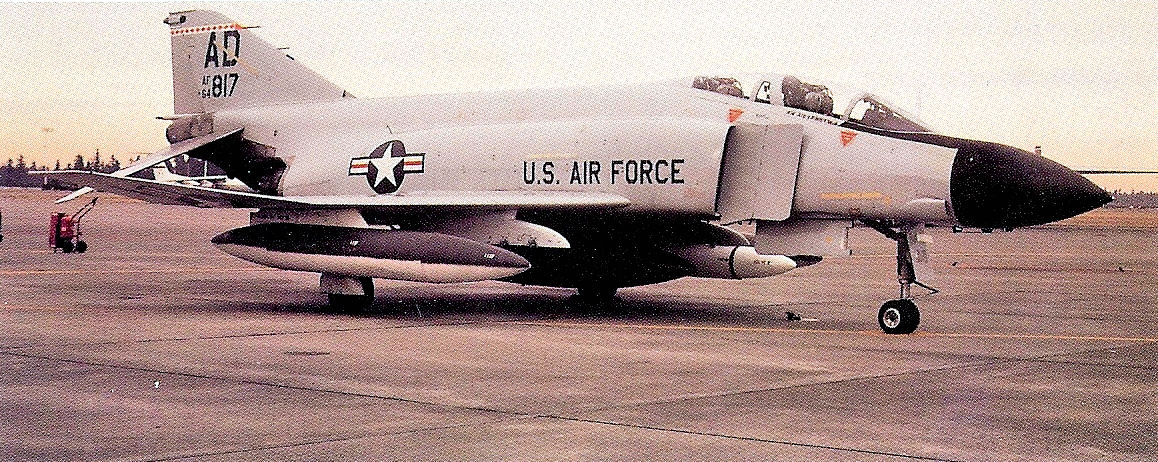
McDonnell F-4C-23-MC Phantom II, 64-0817, 3247th Test Squadron, Eglin AFB, Florida. Note ADCOM Gray scheme. Retired about 1990, now on display at Air Force Armament Museum, Eglin AFB.

The 3246th Test Wing was a flight test component of the Air Proving Ground Center, later Armament Division, at Eglin Air Force Base, Florida, and was activated 1 July 1970 to provide weapon and countermeasures test duties. It was replaced by the 46th Test Wing in October 1992.

This unit is notable for operating the last active-duty USAF F-4D Phantom II (66-8800), relegated to the Eglin target range in July 1992. It carried the logo "Phantoms Phorever 1963–1992". 66-8800 has been sitting on the ramp at Pierce Field (Eglin Auxiliary Field #2) since retirement. It is there in 2012.

== History ==
Assigned to the 3246th Test Wing was the 3247th Test Squadron, which inherited F-4C/D/E and RF-4C Phantom II aircraft formerly assigned to the Air Proving Ground Center's 4533d Test Wing. The 3247th aircraft carried AD and ET tail codes, and a white tailband with red diamonds.

=== Components ===
- 6585th Test Group, 1 January 1984 – 1 October 1992
- 3247th Test Squadron, 1 July 1970 – 1 October 1992 (inactivated and consolidated with 40th Tactical Fighter Squadron)

=== Stations ===
- Eglin Air Force Base, Florida, 1 July 1970 – 1 October 1992

=== Aircraft ===
- A-10A Thunderbolt II
- YA-10B Thunderbolt II
- C-131B Samaritan
- C-130 Hercules
- F-4 Phantom II
- RF-4C Phantom II
- F-15 Eagle
- F-15E Strike Eagle
- F-16 Fighting Falcon
- F-100D Super Sabre
- General Dynamics F-111A
- General Dynamics F-111E
- T-38 Talon
- CT-39A Sabreliner
- HH-1H, UH-1N Huey
- UH-60 Black Hawk
