= Air Force Missile Development Center =

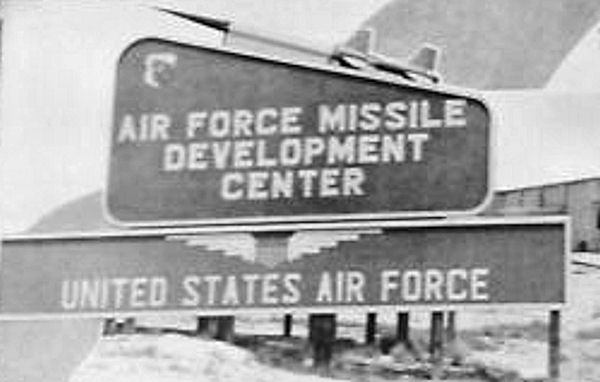
- Air Force Missile Development Center sign in 1958
- Active: 1 September 1957-1 August 1970
- Country: United States
- Branch: United States Air Force, assigned to: Air Force Systems Command, 1 April 1961; Air Research and Development Command, 1 December 1957; with predecessors assigned to: Air Proving Ground Command, 29 December 1951; Air Proving Ground, 1 June 1948; Air Materiel Command, 20 January 1948; Air Proving Ground Command, 16 March 1947
- Role: Research & Development

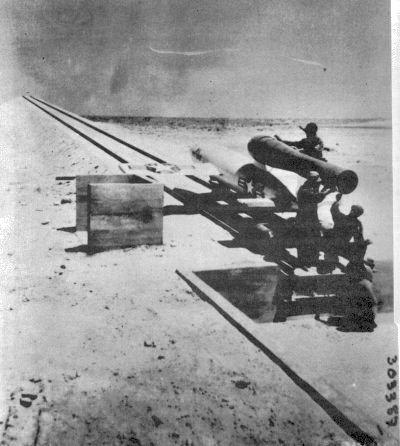
1948 April 23-1949 January 10: AMC Project EO-727-12 reactivated JB-2 launches at Holloman for testing missile guidance control and seeker systems, and telemetering/optical tracking facilities, as well as use as targets for new surface-to-air and air-to-air missiles. The above two-rail JB-2 launch ramp at Holloman was a 400 ft (120 m) on a 3° earth-filled slope—a second 40 ft (12 m) ramp was on a trailer (1948–49 missile detection experiments used modified SCR-270 radar at Holloman.)

The Air Force Missile Development Center and its predecessors were Cold War units that conducted and supported numerous missile tests using facilities at Holloman Air Force Base, where the center was the host unit ("Holloman" and "Development Center" were sometimes colloquially used to identify military installations in the Tularosa Basin).

== Background ==
Planned for British Overseas Training which was not pursued, World War II construction for a Tularosa Basin USAAF base 6 mi (9.7 km) west of Alamogordo, New Mexico, began on 6 February 1942. A nearby military range was established by Executive Order No. 9029, and the Alamogordo Bombing and Gunnery Range was designated on 14 May 1942. On 27 May 1942 the USAAF base was designated Alamogordo Field Training Station for range support and was subsequently named Alamogordo Army Air Base.

== 359th Base Headquarters ==
The 359th Base Headquarters was the base operating unit for Alamorgordo AAB beginning on 10 June 1942, and the base was redesignated Alamogordo Army Air Field on 21 November 1942 and supported numerous WWII Bomber Groups (range targets were added in late 1942.) In October 1944 at Wendover Army Air Base, Utah, the Special Weapons Field Test Unit was established as a detachment of the Special Weapons Branch in Ohio to evaluate captured and experimental systems such as the Republic-Ford JB-2, a copy of the German V-1 flying bomb. South of Alamogordo AAF between White Sands National Monument and Fort Bliss, water well drilling began construction of White Sands Proving Ground (WSPG) facilities on 25 June 1945.

On 25 March 1944, the 231st AAF BU became the base operating unit, and in 1946 the post-war Alamogordo AAF was "manned by a skeleton crew merely as a plane refueling station, [for] emergency landings, etc" (the USACE property division "acquired...exclusive use of all private lands and interests within the Alamogordo Bombing Range until 1967".) In March 1947, the 1st Experimental Guided Missiles Group of Florida began Republic-Ford JB-2 testing at the Alamogordo range, and the Special Weapons Field Test Unit was inactivated when Wendover transferred to Strategic Air Command. Equipment and 1,200 personnel of the Test Unit moved to a new Alamogordo AAF unit organized 16 March 1947 (4145th Army Air Forces Base Unit), and the move continued until September 1947 for R&D of pilotless aircraft, guided missiles, and other programs. The Balloon Branch at Alamogordo AAF began in 1947 after an Air Materiel Command awarded a contract to New York University (NYU) to develop and fly high-altitude balloons. The 4145th was redesignated an Air Force Base Unit on 27 September 1947 during the month the USAF was created, and in late 1947 the former USAAF bombing range and the White Sands Proving Ground merged to become the New Mexico Joint Guided Missile Test Range. The former USAAF air base was designated Holloman Air Force Base on 14 January 1948, and the 2754th Air Force Base was its host unit after being established from the 4145th AFBU on 15 August 1948 (the 2754th AFB unit's "Headquarters and Headquarters Squadron" were established by 15 December 1948).

== Alamogordo Guided Missile Test Base ==
The Alamogordo Guided Missile Test Base near Holloman AFB continued to be used for testing in 1948 and later (July 1951 – 31 August 1952), sub-base of the AFMTC in Florida, and the 2754th subsequently developed additional launch support sites at/near the former bombing range (e.g., Four Bits Peak Instrumentation Annex assigned June 1949 "7 mi ESE of Alamogordo, NM"). In March 1949, the 2754th took "control of [the Army's range] support airfield, Condron Field...from Biggs Army Air Field at Fort Bliss." The 2754th and subsequent units' launches at the test base and other sites such as for the Tiny Tim (the first Army rocket), GAM-63 RASCAL, and XQ-2 Drone, e.g.:

- 1947 June 5: A "cluster of rubber-type balloons" for research was launched near Alamogordo.
- 1947 July 3: A balloon was launched from "Holloman" [sic] by a New York University team.
- 1947 November 14: The Alamogordo Guided Missile Test Base had its 1st Boeing GAPA missile launch (the 39th GAPA launch and 1st with a ramjet--the last GAPA was launched in 1950.)
- 1948 May–November: Demonstration rockets for the NATIV launch vehicle program were fired at Holloman (a blockhouse built for the program was also used for JB-2 launches.)
- 1948 July: USAF Project MX–774 commenced with the first RTV-A-2 Hiroc launch (from the Army's White Sands Proving Ground's Launch Complex 33)
- 1949 June 14: Holloman prepared the 2nd monkey capsule for the Albert Project, a V-2 suborbital mission which flew the first mammal, the rhesus monkey Albert II, into space.
- 1949: Tactical Air Command began testing the B-61 (redesignated TM-61, then MGM-1 Matador) at Holloman—the initial flight crashed and the 2nd launch outran the chase aircraft--there were 25 total Matador launches at Holloman (the JB-2 trailer ramp was adapted for the MGM-1 Matador.)
- 1949: The 1st X–8 Aerobee was launched at Holloman (the last was in 1958).
- 1950: 1st test on the test track was an SM-62 Snark
- 1950 July 15: The 3,550 ft (1,080 m) Snark missile launching facility was completed for N-25 models at the Holloman SLED/Snark launch complex.
- 1950 August 29: 1st of the balloon flights for the Aero Medical Laboratory.
- 1950 December 21: In the 1st Snark flight test "the missile disengaged from its sled below flight separation speed and was destroyed".
- 1951 April 18: From Holloman Air Force Base, New Mexico, an Aerobee research rocket carried a monkey into space.
- 1951-2: A 2/3-scale version of the GAM-63 Rascal called "Shrike" was tested at Holloman AFB by the 6556th Guided Missile Squadron.
- 1952: A "covered wagon launcher" was used for Project Moby Dick (Project 119L) balloon launches at Holloman.
- 1952 (mid): The Holloman range of more than 200,000 acres (81,000 ha) was 2nd in area to the Eglin range (the Edwards range was 3rd.)
- 1952: Falcon model "C" and "D" missiles were fired against bomber drones by the 31 March cadre assigned to Holloman AFB from Patrick AFB's 6556th Guided Missile Squadron.
- 1954 March 19: a new 3,500 ft (1,100 m) rocket-powered sled was first run
- 1955 Spring: Rocket sled Sonic Wind Number 2 was received
- 1956: Ground firings of AIR-2 Genie missiles identified fin instabilities.
- 1956 September 1: The 500th Holloman balloon launch was conducted.
- 1957 February: Test and evaluation of the XSM-73 Goose decoy began with the Holloman rocket sled.
- 1958: Two F-100 chase planes escorted a MGM-13 Mace from Holloman to Wendover AFB.
- 1958 June 8: Detachment 1, 4504th Missile Training Wing was established to test TM-76 Mace missiles

Reorganizations changed the Holloman wing's name to the 2754th Experimental Wing (on 20 September 1949—the 2d Guided Missiles Squadron was a subordinate from 25 October-30 December 1950), the 6540th Missile Test Group (30 June 1951, later 6580th Missile Test Group on 1 September 1952) which had an "Aero-Medical Sub-Unit...to support the Aeromedical Field Laboratory." In May 1952, an additional 40 mi × 117 mi (64 km × 188 km) area was set aside to add to the "Alamogordo bombing range, White Sands proving ground, and the Fort Bliss antiaircraft range".

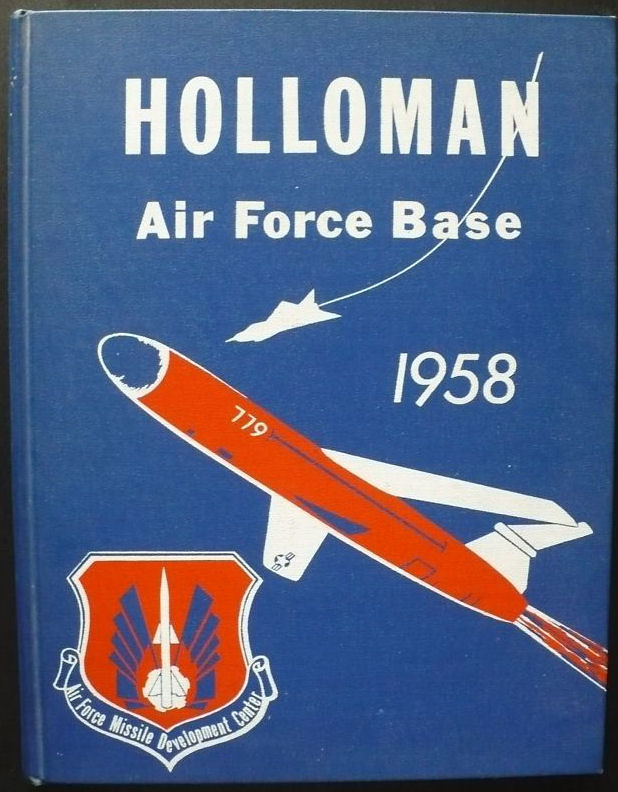
The 1958 cover of the base handbook featured the emblem of the Air Force Missile Development Center

== Development centers ==
The Holloman Air Development Test Center (later Holloman Air Development Center, HADC) was established from the 6580th Wing on 10 October 1952 while Colonel Don R. Ostrander was the commander (7 June 1952 – 26 September 1954). On 1 October 1953, HADC continued as the test unit after transferring "base operating unit" responsibilities to the 6580th Test Support Wing. ARDC's Dr. Ernst Steinhoff "in the 1950s was building up the Air Development Center at Holloman Air Force Base through most of the decade". The center supported tests for Air Force flights and upcoming crewed space flights, e.g., 1955 Project Manhigh, 1959–60 Project Excelsior, the first human tests in the rocket sled firings, and Ham, a chimpanzee, who went through astronaut training in 1959.

The Air Force Missile Development Center (AFMDC. "AF Mil Dev Test Cen") was designated from HADC on 1 September 1957, the year when a Matador missile from the center crashed in western Colorado (the joint range was renamed White Sands Missile Range on 1 May 1958) The 6571st Aeromedical Research Laboratory was activated 1 December 1961 as an AFMDC unit, and the center's Twin Buttes Instrumentation Annex "16 mi SSW of Alamogordo, NM" (assigned December 1949) transferred under the WSMR Army headquarters in November 1963.

== 6585th Test Group ==
The AFMDC and the 6571st lab were inactivated on 1 August 1970; more than 450 military and 570 civilian positions were lost; and the AFSWC's 6585th Test Group was established as a tenant of Tactical Air Command, to which Holloman AFB transferred. Associate units and programs transferred to other locations within Air Force Systems Command. In addition to the Holloman High Speed Test Track operated by the 6585th's "Armaments Division" in 1974, remaining facilities included the Central Inertial Guidance Test Facility (CIGTF), the Radar Target Scatter Facility (RATSCAT), and the Target Drone Facility.

External videos
- Holloman Range Control (minute 4:55)
