= RTV-A-3 NATIV =

Missile

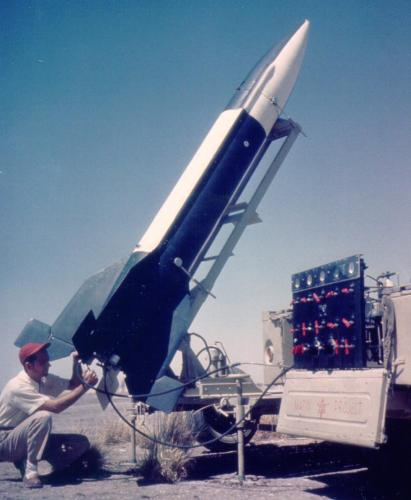
- A RTV-A-3 is prepared for a launch test
- Type: Experimental test rocket
- Place of origin: United States

Service history
- In service: 1948
- Used by: United States Air Force

Production history
- Designed: 1947
- Manufacturer: North American Aviation
- No. built: 7

Specifications
- Mass: 1,200 pounds (540 kg)
- Length: 13 feet 4 inches (4.06 m)
- Diameter: 18 inches (460 mm)
- Wingspan: 4 feet 3.5 inches (1.308 m)
- Engine: Rocket; 2,600 lbf (12 kN)
- Propellant: liquid fuel
- Operational range: 40 miles (64 km)
- Flight ceiling: 63,000 feet (19,000 m)
- Maximum speed: c. Mach 3
- Guidance system: None

The RTV-A-3 NATIV was an experimental missile developed by North American Aviation for the United States Air Force in the late 1940s to test and evaluate guided missile technologies. The North American Test Instrumentation Vehicle (NATIV) was developed as part of the MX-770 program which was created towards the end of WWII with the intent of developing a long range missile.

== Conception and design ==
Exactly what the type of the missile, its range and payload were all changing during the period from the mid-1940s to early 1950s. One major consideration was that limited funds meant that an extensive build / test / modify process such as that used by the Germans in developing the V-2 was not possible. Due to budgetary restraints a great deal more information had to be readily derived from each of far fewer flights.

On the RTV-A-2 (MX-774), a camera recorded the results displayed upon an instrument panel. Both the number of parameters recorded and the survivability of the film record were limited. Therefore, dependence upon the intact recovery of this camera was not desirable.

NATIV was designed to utilize the then-new FM/FM telemetry to send a number of channels of data in real time during the flight of the missile. Development of the NATIV was to contribute to design of the XSSM-A-4 Navajo missile.

The design of the NATIV was influenced by the German Wasserfall which was aerodynamically proven in the speed range to be studied. The shape of the missile and its fins were utilized though at 52% of size of the Wasserfall. The exhaust vanes used for low velocity control of Wasserfall were omitted and preliminary guidance was provided by a launch tower similar to that used by the RTV-A-2 and Aerobee (RTV-N-8 / RTV-A-1)rockets.

The engine for NATIV was a development of the WAC Corporal engine. Built by Aerojet, the 21AL2600 engine was later used by the early Aerobee. With the creation of the United States Air Force in September 1947, Project MX-770 was assigned to the new Air Force, while ballistic missiles were assigned to the Army Ground Forces / Army Service Forces as advanced artillery.

== Funding ==
The NATIV program was poorly funded. Jeff Schmidt, a guidance engineer on the project, commented upon the difficulties of an underfunded ad hoc program being conducted at a remote location. "It had become apparent that the instrumentation program was underfunded and behind schedule . . . we went through scrap bins to get wire."

== Failures in the program ==
Boeing engineers with the GAPA program, which occupied the pad adjacent to the NATIV effort, jokingly deemed the missile "North American Tried In Vain", and after launch failures, labeled it as "Not Able To Increase Velocity."

The NATIV was so primitive that there was little provision for range safety. There was no destruct system so if the missile was tracked on an incorrect trajectory by the SCR-584 radars, the only provision to terminate the flight was to shut down the engine by command.

The surviving data about the NATIV portion of the MX-770 project is sparse and often contradictory.

Though mention is made in some sources of 20 rockets, there is only record of six attempts to launch NATIV.

On the basis of "successful" flights the NATIV missile was a resounding failure. Two flights totally failed, three missiles largely failed, and only one flight succeeded partially.

== Legacy ==
However, the program might well be considered a partial success in that on several missions telemetry of data occurred which was after all was one of the major objectives of the North American Test Instrumentation Vehicle. Under USAF control MX-770 developed into WS-104A which developed the successful RTV-A-5 or X-10 research vehicle, and the much less successful Navaho II (XSSM-A-4, or G-26).

A product of project number MX-770, NATIV - the North American Test Instrument Vehicle - was influenced by the design of the Wasserfall surface-to-air missile developed in Germany during World War II. Used as a test vehicle for missile technology on behalf of the SM-64 Navaho project, information on the results of the NATIV project are inconsistent, with some sources claiming six successes of 20 launch attempts, while others suggest only one of six launch attempts was a partial success.

NATIV was a highly classified program in a highly classified subject and as a result, little hard fact was publicized at the time. By the time the information could be declassified development in the field had made it irrelevant. While almost lost in the history of missile development in the United States NATIV, RTV-A-3, was important for what it was a contributing portion of, both in telemetry and the greater MX-770 program.
