= Holloman Air Force Base =

US Air Force base near Alamogordo, New Mexico, United States

- Near Alamogordo, New Mexico in the United States
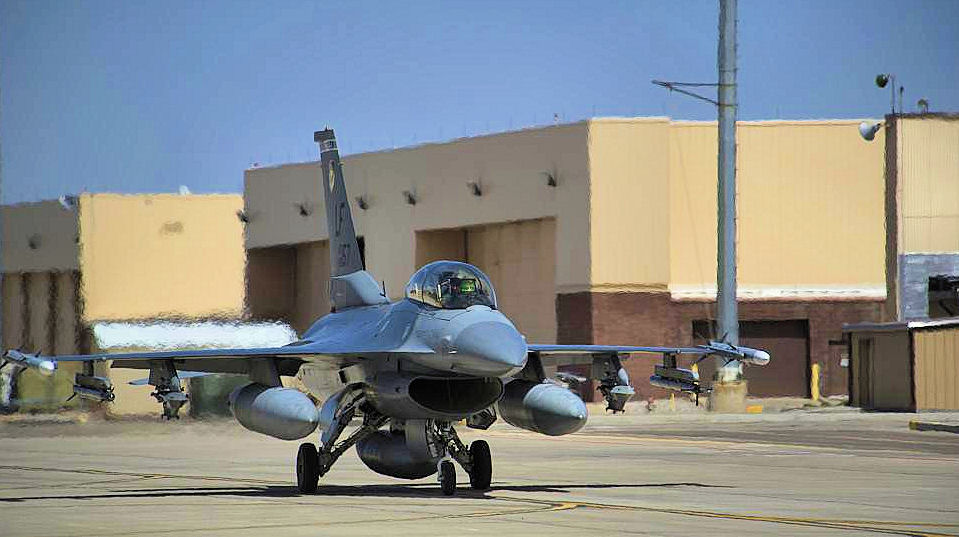
- An F-16 Fighting Falcon of the 54th Fighter Group at Holloman Air Force Base, during 2014

Site information
- Type: US Air Force base
- Owner: Department of Defense
- Operator: US Air Force
- Controlled by: Air Combat Command
- Condition: Operational
- Website: www.holloman.af.mil

Location
- Location within New Mexico Location within the United States
- Coordinates: 32°51′09″N 106°06′23″W

Site history
- Built: 1942 (as Alamogordo Army Air Field)
- In use: 1942–present

Garrison information
- Current commander: Colonel Ryan P Keeney
- Garrison: 49th Wing (Host wing); 54th Fighter Group; 704th Test Group; Royal Air Force RPAS Formal Training Unit

Airfield information
- Identifiers: IATA: HMN, ICAO: KHMN, FAA LID: HMN, WMO: 747320
- Elevation: 1,248 m (4,093 ft) AMSL
Runways
Direction	Length and surface
07/25	3,939 m (12,922 ft) porous European mix
16/34	3,698 m (12,134 ft) porous European mix
04/22	3,224 m (10,578 ft) porous European mix

Holloman Air Force Base (IATA: HMN, ICAO: KHMN, FAA LID: HMN) is a United States Air Force base established in 1942 located six miles (10 km) southwest of the central business district of Alamogordo, which is the county seat of Otero County, New Mexico, United States. The base was named in honor of Col. George V. Holloman, a pioneer in guided missile research. It is the home of the 49th Wing (49 WG) of the Air Combat Command (ACC).

In addition to hosting several combat wings, Holloman supports the nearby White Sands Missile Range and currently hosts the Royal Air Force RPAS (Remotely Piloted Aircraft System) Formal Training Unit (FTU) and the Italian Air Force RPA training courses. The base previously hosted the German Air Force Flying Training Center.

== History ==
Planned for the British Overseas Training program which was not pursued, construction for the USAAF base 6 mi (9.7 km) west of Alamogordo, New Mexico, began on 6 February 1942. After the nearby Alamogordo Bombing and Gunnery Range was established by Executive Order No. 9029 (range designation on 14 May), the neighboring military installation was designated Alamogordo Field Training Station (27 May) and Alamogordo Army Air Base (operated by the 359th Base Headquarters beginning on 10 June 1942).

=== Alamogordo Army Air Field ===
Alamogordo Army Airfield 1944 photo pictorial

Alamogordo Army Air Field (Alamogordo AAFld, Alamogordo AAF) was named on 21 November as a Second Air Force installation equipped with aprons, runways, taxiways and hangars. From 1942 to 1945 the AAF had more than 20 different groups for overseas training, initially flying Boeing B-17 Flying Fortresses then Consolidated B-24 Liberators. Training began in 1943 and in addition to the range, a detached installation operated by the base was the Alamogordo Gasoline Storage and Pumping Station Annex.

In 1944 the "base operating unit" changed to the 231st Army Air Force Base Unit (25 March) and 4145 AAFBU (24 August), and on 16 April 1945 Alamogordo AAF was relieved of its training mission and assigned to Continental Air Forces to become a permanent B-29 base. Instead, by 30 January 1946, the base was planned to "be manned by a skeleton crew merely as a plane refuelling station, [for] emergency landings, etc.", and it was temporarily inactivated on 28 February 1946. Post-war the AAF was used to support the Alamogordo Guided Missile Test Base which had its first Boeing Ground-to-Air Pilotless Aircraft launch on 14 November 1947.

With the September 1947 formation of the USAF, in late 1947 the Holloman range and the White Sands Proving Ground merged to become the New Mexico Joint Guided Missile Test Range (later renamed White Sands Missile Range), and the renamed Holloman Air Force Base (13 January 1948) supported WSMR launch complexes (Launch Complex 33, etc.) firing of Tiny Tim (the first Army rocket), Rascal, V-2 rocket, Ryan XQ-2 Drone, Falcon, MGM-13 Mace, MGM-1 Matador, and AGM-45 Shrike. The 2754th Experimental Wing was activated on 20 September 1949 to oversee all research and development projects.

=== Holloman Air Development Center ===
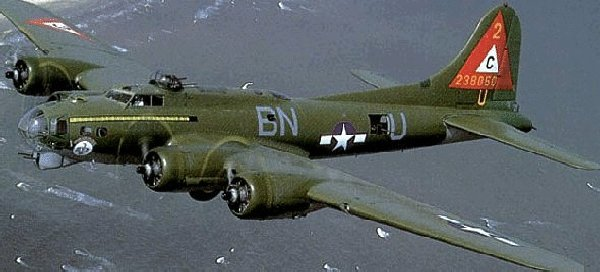
Boeing B-17G-75-BO Fortress AAF Serial No. 42-38050 of the 303d Bombardment Group

The Holloman Air Development Center became the base operating unit on 10 October 1952, and the 3,500 ft (1,100 m) rocket-powered sled was first run on 19 March 1954. On 10 December 1954, Lt Colonel (Dr.) John P. Stapp rode a Holloman rocket propelled test sled, Sonic Wind No. 1, to a speed of 632 miles per hour (1,017 km/h). The center was renamed the Air Force Missile Development Center on 1 September 1957 and inactivated on 1 August 1970.

Additionally, Captain Joseph W. Kittinger, Jr., stepped out of an open balloon gondola at 102,800 feet (31.3 km) on 16 August 1960, in an attempt to evaluate techniques of high altitude bailout. Capt Kittinger's jump lasted 13 minutes, reaching a velocity of 614 mph (988 km/h). That jump broke four world records: highest open gondola manned balloon flight, highest balloon flight of any kind, highest bailout, and longest free fall.

The Aero-Medical Field Laboratory at Holloman "conducted space flight training with chimpanzees [in] 1961–1962", including Ham on a suborbital flight launched 31 January 1961, the first great ape in space, and Enos on a 1961 orbital flight as the third great ape to orbit Earth.

=== Tactical Fighter Wing ===
Maj. John A. Schaffer beside an F4D jet at Holloman AFB

The 366th Tactical Fighter Wing arrived on 15 July 1963, making Holloman a Tactical Air Command (TAC) operating base. On 8 April 1966, the 4758th Defense Systems Evaluation Squadron (DSES) arrived from Biggs AFB Texas. The squadron evaluated aircraft weapons systems and to provide training for air defense units. Aircraft flown by the 4758th DSES were the B-57 Canberra and F-100 Super Sabre. On 31 October 1970 the squadron was merged with the 4677th DSES at Tyndall AFB Florida.

On 1 August 1970, per Air Force Systems Command Special Order G-94, the Air Force Missile Development Center was inactivated. TAC assumed host responsibilities for Holloman Air Force Base. Associate units and programs transferred to other locations within Air Force Systems Command. The Test & Evaluation activities that remained were the Central Inertial Guidance Test Facility (CIGTF), the High Speed Test Track, the Radar Target Scatter Facility (RATSCAT), and the Target Drone Facility.

These organizations were combined to form the nucleus of a Holloman AFB tenant organization, the 6585th Test Group, with the Air Force Special Weapons Center (AFSWC) at Kirtland Air Force Base, New Mexico, designated as the headquarters for the Test Group.

In 1975, AFSWC was disestablished, and the 6585th Test Group at Holloman became part of the Armament Development and Test Center (ADTC) at Eglin AFB Florida.

=== Tactical Training Center ===
Holloman was designated a Tactical Training Center on 1 August 1977 and on 1 October 1993, the Air Force Development Test Center at Eglin AFB was redesignated as the Air Armament Center (AAC).

In 1986, a contract was awarded to Flight Systems Inc. (later Honeywell) to modify 194 surplus Convair F-106 Delta Dart aircraft stored at Davis-Monthan AFB Arizona to the QF-106A target drone configuration. This program came to be known as Pacer Six, and the first flight of a converted drone took place in July 1987. Following the completion of an initial batch of ten QF-106s in 1990, most of the work was transferred to the USAF itself. Much of the conversion work was done before the aircraft were removed from storage at AMARC, with further work being carried out at East St Louis, Illinois.

The QF-106s began operating as a Full-Scale Aerial Target (FSAT) in late 1991 at White Sands Missile Range New Mexico, and later at the Eglin Gulf Test Range in Florida (based at Holloman and Tyndall). A typical mission would employ the QF-106 as a target for an infrared homing missile. The aircraft had burners placed on pylons underneath the wings to act as IR sources for heat-seeking missiles. The intention of the program was for the QF-106 to survive repeated engagements with air-to-air missiles, to make it possible for each QF-106 to last as long as possible before it was destroyed. The last shootdown of a QF-106 (57–2524) took place at Holloman AFB on 20 February 1997. The QF-106 was replaced by the QF-4 Phantom drone.

Today, the 96th Test Group from Eglin Air Force Base Florida is responsible for operational testing and evaluation of new equipment and systems proposed for use by these forces. Current initiatives include advanced self-protection systems for combat aircraft, aircrew life support systems, aerial reconnaissance improvements, new armament and weapons delivery systems, and improved maintenance equipment and logistics support.

=== 366th Tactical Fighter Wing ===
On 15 July 1963, after serving at Chaumont-Semoutiers Air Base, France as a conventional strike force in Europe, the 366th Tactical Fighter Wing moved to Holloman. The move was a result of French president Charles DeGaulle's deep suspicion of "supranational organizations" and his country's shift away from the NATO orbit in the early 1960s that ultimately led to the closure of American air bases in France.

366th TFW was organized as follows:

- 389th Tactical Fighter Squadron (blue striping)
- 390th Tactical Fighter Squadron (yellow striping)
- 391st Tactical Fighter Squadron (red striping)
- 480th Tactical Fighter Squadron (green striping)

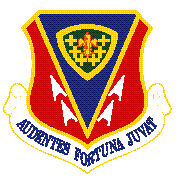
Emblem of the 366th Tactical Fighter Wing

At the time of the wing's arrival at Holloman, they flew the Republic F-84F Thunderstreak, which were former Air National Guard aircraft transferred to France during the 1961 Berlin Crisis as part of Operation Tack Hammer. At Holloman, the wing began converting to the new McDonnell Douglas F-4C Phantom II in February 1965.

Later that year, the wing sent its first squadron to the Republic of Vietnam. The 390th Fighter Squadron was assigned to Da Nang AB, and the 391st went to Cam Ranh Bay AB in early 1966.

On 20 March 1966 the rest of the wing entered the conflict and moved to Phan Rang AB, Republic of Vietnam in support of combat operations in Vietnam. With the transfer of the 366th to Vietnam, the 6583d Air Base Group became the host unit at Holloman.

=== 49th Tactical Fighter Wing ===
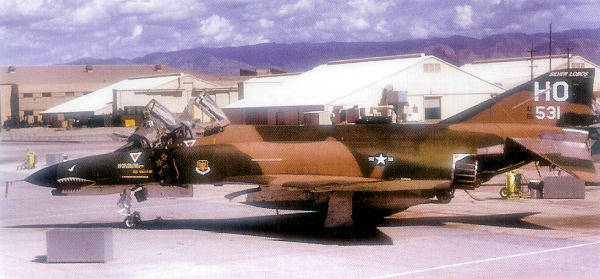
McDonnell Douglas F-4E-41-MC Phantom II AF Serial No. 68-0531 of the 49th FW. This aircraft was brought out of AMARC storage in 1997 as part of the USAF 50th Anniversary and repainted in a Southeast Asia camouflage motif. It is still on the rolls of AMARC as of 2008.

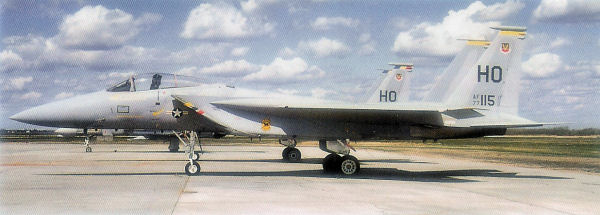
McDonnell Douglas F-15A-19-MC Eagle AF Serial No. 77-0115 of the 8th Fighter Squadron. After the end of its active service, this aircraft was transferred to the 101st Fighter Squadron of the Massachusetts Air National Guard based at Otis ANGB.

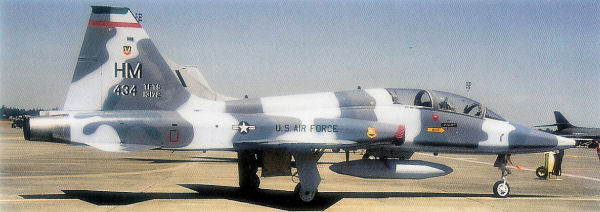
Northrop AT-38B-55-NO Talon AF Serial No. 64-13172 of the 434th TFTS/479th TTW

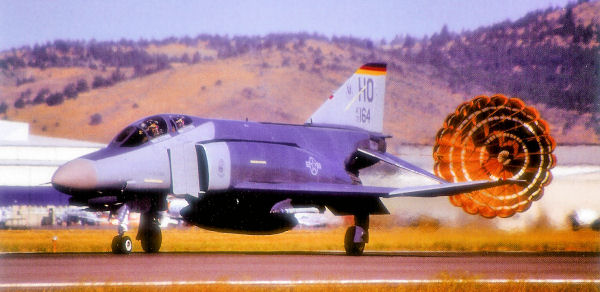
German Air Force McDonnell Douglas F-4F-55-MC Phantom AF Serial No. 72-1164 flown by the 20th Fighter Squadron in USAF markings. This aircraft was flown by Jagdgeschwader 74 at Neuburg Air Base in Germany until January 2005.

On 1 July 1968, the 49th Tactical Fighter Wing arrived at Holloman Air Force Base from Spangdahlem AB, West Germany, becoming the first dual-based tactical fighter wing. The 6583d Air Base Group was inactivated in place.

Under the dual-basing concept, the 49th, stationed at Holloman, deployed individual squadrons periodically to Europe, fulfilling their NATO commitment. The operational squadrons of the 49th TFW upon its arrival were:

- 7th Tactical Fighter Squadron (HB/HO, blue)
- 8th Tactical Fighter Squadron (HC/HO, yellow)
- 9th Tactical Fighter Squadron (HD/HO, red)

All three squadrons flew the McDonnell Douglas F-4D Phantom II. In 1972 squadron aircraft tail codes were standardized on "HO".

In 1969, the wing participated in its first dual-basing exercise, Crested Cap I, deploying 2,000 personnel and 72 aircraft to NATO bases in Europe. Also in 1969, the 49th earned the coveted MacKay Trophy for the "most meritorious flight of the year", for the redeployment from Germany to Holloman after Crested Cap II. The MacKay Trophy recognized the 49th for the fastest non-stop deployment of jet aircraft accomplished by a wing's entire fleet.

In May 1972, the 49th deployed their F-4 aircraft and 2,600 personnel to Takhli RTAFB Thailand. During this deployment the 49th flew more than 21,000 combat hours over just about every battle zone from An Loc to vital installations in the Hanoi vicinity. During five months of combat, the wing did not lose any aircraft or personnel. The unit received an Air Force Outstanding Unit Award with Combat "V" Device for its participation. The 49th TFW officially closed out its Southeast Asia duty on 9 October 1972, turning over Takhli to a former host unit at Holloman, the 366th TFW which was transferred from Da Nang Air Base South Vietnam.

F-15 Eagle era

On 20 December 1977, the wing began converting from the F-4D to F-15A/Bs. The transition was completed on 4 June 1978.

History was made during February 1980, when two pilots from the 49th each flew their F-15s 6,200 miles in just over 14 hours, establishing a record for the longest flight of a single-seat fighter aircraft. The flights required six aerial refuelings, proving the global power of the 49th Tactical Fighter Wing.

In July 1980, the wing acquired the commitment of a primary Rapid Deployment Force unit. This tasking, which lasted for a year, required the wing to be ready to deploy its aircraft, crews, and support personnel on short notice. The wing served with the Rapid Deployment Force until July 1981, when the tasking was transferred to the 1st Tactical Fighter Wing, Langley Air Force Base Virginia.

The 49th demonstrated its capabilities in the fall of 1988, winning top honors at the William Tell air-to-air weapons competition. The wing outdistanced the nearest competitor by more than 2,000 points. The 49th won a variety of awards, including the coveted "Top Gun" for best fighter pilot.

F-117 Nighthawk era

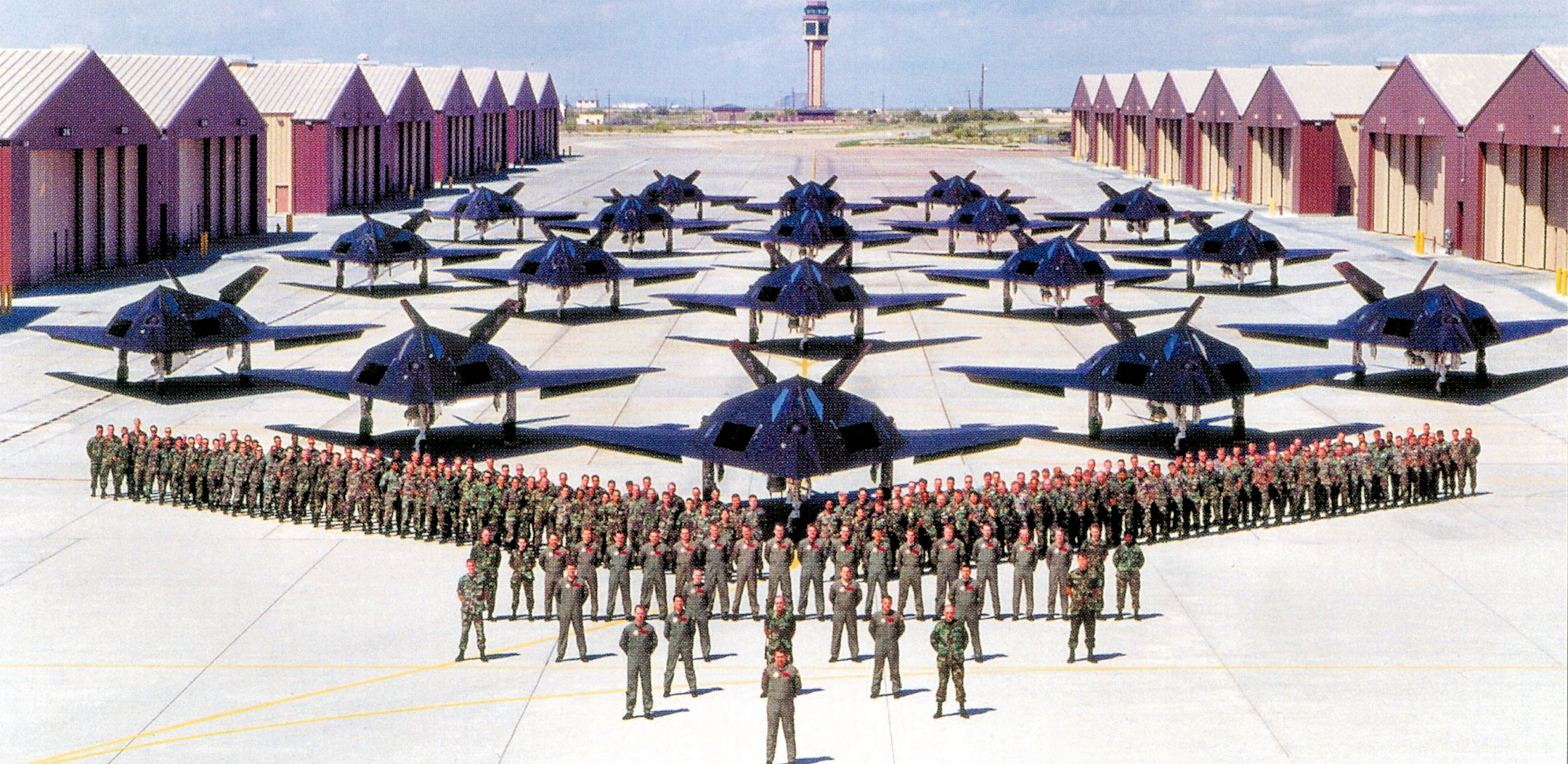
18 F-117 at Holloman, 1992.

From 1991 to 1993, the 49th underwent a number of transitions. On 1 October 1991, the 49th was redesignated the 49th Fighter Wing as part of an Air Force wide redesignation of units.

On 1 November 1991, the 7th Fighter Squadron ceased F-15 operations, performing a Lead-In Fighter Training (LIFT) mission with Northrop AT-38B Talons, preparing for the transition to the Lockheed F-117A Nighthawk. during most of 1992.

On 1 June 1992, the 8th Fighter Squadron ceased F-15 operations and started flying AT-38B LIFT missions.

The 9th Fighter Squadron ceased F-15 operations on 5 June 1992 and received F-4E aircraft from the 20th Fighter Squadron from the closing George AFB California as the Fighter Training Unit for the German Air Force.

The last F-15 departed Holloman 5 June 1992, ending 14 years of Eagle operations.

On 9 May 1992, four Lockheed F-117A Nighthawk stealth fighters from the Tonopah Test Range Airport Nevada, arrived at Holloman. The 37th Tactical Fighter Wing at Tonopah was inactivated with the transfer of the last F-117s to Holloman on 8 July 1992.

F-117s were initially assigned to the following squadrons:

- 69th Fighter Squadron -> 8th FS (1 July 1993)
- 69th Fighter Squadron -> 9th FS (1 July 1993)
- 417th Fighter Squadron -> 7th FS (1 December 1993)

These squadrons were PCS (moved Permanent Change of Station) to Holloman as part of the 37th Operations Group on 15 June 1992. The formal transfer to the 49th Operations group occurred on 8 July 1992 when the 37th OG was inactivated. In 1993 these squadrons were inactivated with assets transferred to the 7th, 8th and 9th Fighter Squadrons. The 7th was designated a combat training squadron, the 8th and 9th being deployable operational fighter squadrons.

On 1 July 1993, the 20th Fighter Squadron was activated as part of the 49th Operations Group, taking over the F-4Es of the 9th FS. The mission of the 20th FS was to conduct training with the German Air Force. The F-4Es which the 20th FS flew initially were USAF-owned aircraft, however in 1997 the squadron began flying German-owned F-4F aircraft. The F-4Fs, however flew in USAF markings. The 20th Fighter Squadron was inactivated on 20 December 2004 and the F-4Fs were flown to the Aerospace Maintenance and Regeneration Group. The first arrival, 72-1118, was delivered by Col. Kevin Zeeck on 18 November. The second, 72-1218, arrived at the base two days later. The remaining 14 F-4s arrived at AMARG by the second week of January 2005 in 4 further waves.

The 48th Rescue Squadron was activated at Holloman AFB on 1 May 1993 with its six Sikorsky HH-60G Pave Hawk helicopters. The personnel of the 48th deployed six times in support of Operations Northern and Southern Watch. Additionally, the 48th saved 33 lives in real-world rescues in the American Southwest. The unit was inactivated on 1 February 1999.

The 8th and 9th Fighter Squadrons deployed to Aviano Air Base, Italy and Spangdahlem Air Base, Germany, from 21 February–1 July 1999, in support of Operation Allied Force. Flying more than 1,000 total sorties, pilots flew into heavily defended skies, littered with surface-to-air missiles and anti-aircraft fire. In particular, F-117A pilots bravely trusting in their aircraft's low observable technology struck some of the most valuable, and highly guarded targets in Serbia. The F-117s penetrated the heavily defended areas, which conventional aircraft could not reach, and at least two aircraft were lost.

Global War on Terror

People, airplanes, and equipment of the 49th Fighter Wing played a key role in the continued global war against terrorism and particularly in Operation Iraqi Freedom. The wing's F-117s played a major role, dropping the first bombs against an Iraqi leadership target in Baghdad on 19 March 2003. In all, F-117 pilots flew more than 80 missions and dropped nearly 100 enhanced guided bomb units against key targets.

Approximately 300 people deployed with the air package and provided direct support to the F-117 mission. Additionally, hundreds of other 49th FW personnel were deployed on other missions.

=== 479th Tactical Training Wing ===
The 479th TTW was activated at Holloman on 1 January 1977 to provide Lead-In Fighter Training (LIFT) training for pilots assigned to fly tactical fighter or attack aircraft. The 479th Flew AT-38B Talons with the following squadrons:

- 416th Tactical Fighter Training Squadron (14 March 1979 – 1 September 1983) (grey stripe)
  Redesignated 433d TFTS (1 September 1983 – 15 November 1991)
- 434th Tactical Fighter Training Squadron (1 January 1977 – 15 November 1991) (red stripe)
- 435th Tactical Fighter Training Squadron (1 January 1977 – 15 November 1991) (blue stripe)
- 436th Tactical Fighter Training Squadron (1 January 1977 – 15 November 1991) (yellow stripe)

All 479th TTW aircraft carried the "HM" tail code. The LIFT program was sharply cut back in 1991, and the wing replaced by the 479th Fighter Group at Holloman, with the aircraft being consolidated under the 586th Flight Training Squadron.

The 479th was inactivated on 31 July 2000, with squadron resources absorbed by the 49th FW, later being transferred to the 46th Test Group as the 586th Flight Test Squadron.

=== Base names ===
- Alamogordo Bombing and Gunnery Range, 14 May 1942
- Alamogordo Field Training Station, 27 May 1942
- Alamogordo Army Air Base, c. June 1942
- Alamogordo Army Air Field, 21 November 1942
- Holloman Air Force Base, 13 January 1948 – present

=== Major commands to which assigned ===
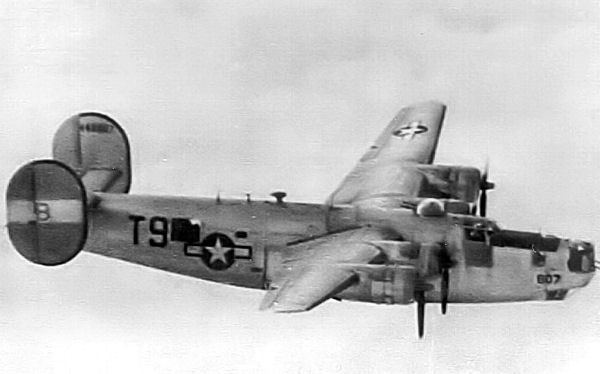
- Consolidated B-24J-180-CO Liberator Serial AAF Serial No. 44-40807 of the 466th Bombardment Group
  Second Air Force, May 1942
- Continental Air Forces, 16 April 1945

re-designated as: Strategic Air Command, 21 March 1946

- Air Materiel Command, 16 March 1947
- Air Research and Development Command, 2 April 1951

re-designated as: Air Force Systems Command, 1 April 1961

- Tactical Air Command, 1 January 1971
- Air Combat Command, 1 June 1992 – 28 September 2018
- Air Education and Training Command, 28 September 2018 – 4 June 2026
- Air Combat Command, 4 June 2026 - Present

=== Major units assigned ===
World War II station units

- 359th Base HQ and Air Base Squadron, 10 June 1942 – 25 March 1944
- 231st Army Air Forces Base Unit, 25 March 1944 – 16 March 1947
- 206th Army Air Forces Base Unit, 22 August 1944 – 6 June 1945
- 1073d Army Air Forces Base Unit, 24 August 1944 – 15 January 1945

World War II training units

- 301st Bombardment Group, 27 May – 21 June 1942 (B-17)
- 303d Bombardment Group, 17 June – 7 August 1942 (B-17)
- 330th Bombardment Group
  1 August – 2 September 1942; 29 November 1942 – 5 April 1943 (B-24 OTU)
- 392d Bombardment Group, 18 March – 18 July 1943 (B-24)
- 454th Bombardment Group, 1 June – 1 July 1943 (B-24)
- 455th Bombardment Group, 1 June – 6 September (B-24)
- 459th Bombardment Group, 1–28 July 1943 (B-24)
- 460th Bombardment Group, 1 July – 31 August 1943 (B-24)
- 449th Bombardment Group, 5 July – 12 September 1943 (B-25)
- 450th Bombardment Group, 8 July – 20 November 1943 (B-24)
- 465th Bombardment Group, 1 August–September 1943 (B-24)
- 466th Bombardment Group
  1–31 August 1943; 24 November 1943 – February 1944 (B-24)
- 36th Fighter Group, 7–26 November 1943 (P-47)
- 400th Bombardment Group, 19 September – 11 December 1943 (B-24 OTU)
- 492d Bombardment Group, October 1943 – January 1944 (B-24)
- 487th Bombardment Group, 15 December 1943 – March 1944 (B-24)
- 25th Bombardment Group, 6 April – 20 June 1944 (B-24 elements)
- 680th Bombardment Squadron, 4 December 1944 – 10 May 1945 (B-24)
- 467th Bombardment Group, 22 August – 8 September 1945 (B-17, YB-29)

United States Air Force

- 4145th Army Air Forces Base Unit, 16 March 1947

Re-designated: 2754th Air Force Base Unit
27 September 1947 – 20 September 1949

- 2754th Experimental Wing, 20 September 1949

Re-designated: 6540th Missile Test Wing, 30 June 1951
Re-designated: 6580th Missile Test Wing, 1 September 1952
Re-designated: Holloman Air Development Center, 10 October 1952
Re-designated: Air Force Missile Development Center
1 September 1957 – 1 August 1970

- 6585th Test Group, 1 August 1970

Re-designated: 46th Test Group, 1 October 1992 – 18 July 2012

- 96th Test Group, 18 July 2012 – present
- 3089th Experimental Group, 5 October 1949

Re-designated: 6540th Missile Test Group, 1 January 1951
Re-designated: 6580th Missile Test Group, 1 October 1953
Re-designated: 6580th Test Group, 1 September 1954 – 1 February 1955

- 6580th Test Support Wing, 1 October 1953

Re-designated: 6580th Air Base Wing, 1 September 1954
Re-designated: 6580th Air Base Group, 1 February 1955 – 1 January 1971

- 3225th Drone Squadron, 1 January 1953 – 25 October 1963
- 6571st Aeromedical Research Laboratory, 1 December 1961 – 31 December 1970
- 366th Tactical Fighter Wing, 15 July 1963 – 11 March 1966
- 4758th Defense Systems Evaluation Squadron, 8 April 1966 – 31 October 1970

Re-designated: Det 1, 4677th Defense Systems Evaluation Squadron
31 October 1970 – 1 July 1974

- 49th Tactical Fighter Wing, 1 July 1968

Re-designated: 49th Fighter Wing, 1 October 1991
re-designated: 49th Wing, 30 June 2010 – present

- 479th Tactical Training Wing, 1 January 1977 – 31 July 2000
- 833d Air Division, 1 December 1980 – 15 November 1991
- Det 1, 82d Aerial Targets Squadron, 1 July 1981 – present
- Det 1, 475th Weapons Evaluation Group
  15 October 1983 – 20 November 1998
- 4th Space Control Squadron, 16 April 1996 – present
- German Air Force Flying Training Center, 1 May 1996 – 1 April 2019
- 44th Fighter Group, 1 February 2010 – 11 July 2014
- 54th Fighter Group, 11 March 2014 – present

=== Aircraft operated from Holloman ===
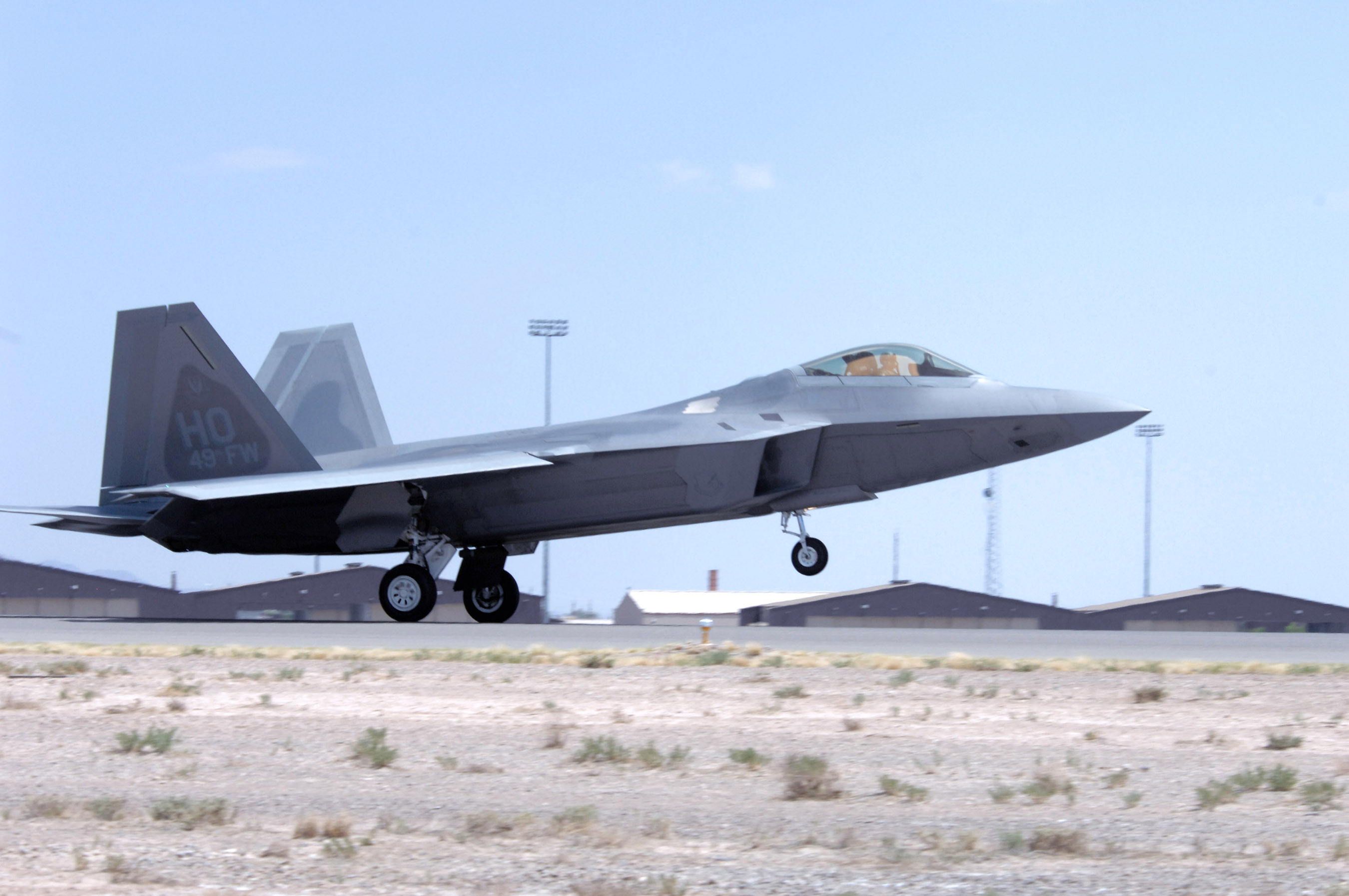
The first F-22 Raptor arriving at Holloman AFB on 2 June 2008

- World War II

B-17E/F Flying Fortress, 1942
B-24D Liberator, 1943–1944
P-47D Thunderbolt, 1943

- United States Air Force

HH-60G Pavehawk, 1993–1999
F-4C/D/E Phantom II, 1963–2004
F-15A Eagle, 1977–1992
F-117A Nighthawk, 1992–2008
F-22A Raptor, 2008–2014
F-16C/D Fighting Falcon, 2014–present
F-84F Thunderstreak, 1963–1965
F-100D Super Sabre, 1963, 1966–1970
EB-57 Canberra, 1966–1970
T-38A Talon, 1968–1976, 1993–2014
AT-38B, 1992–1997
MQ-1B Predator, 2009–present
MQ-9 Reaper, 2009–present

- Drone aircraft

Sabre
QF-100D Super Sabre
QF-106A Delta Dart
QF-4E/G Phantom II
DB-17 Flying Fortress
QB-17 Flying Fortress

- German Air Force

F-4E/F Phantom II, 1993–2004
Panavia Tornado, 1996–2019

== Role and operations ==
The 49th Wing – host wing at Holloman Air Force Base – deploys worldwide to support peacetime and wartime contingencies. The wing provides combat-ready Airmen, and trains General Atomics MQ-9 Reaper pilots (including all Spanish and British Reaper pilots), sensor operators and F-16 Fighting Falcon pilots. Additionally, the wing delivers Air Transportable Clinics and Basic Expeditionary Airfield Resources while providing support to more than 17,000 military and civilian personnel to include German Air Force Flying Training center operations. The wing has served in World War II, Korea, Southeast Asia, Southwest Asia and NATO-led Operation Allied Force. Holloman AFB supports about 21,000 Active Duty, Guard, Reserve, retirees, DoD civilians and their family members.

Holloman is home to the world's longest and fastest high speed test track. The 846th Test Squadron set the world land speed record for a railed vehicle with a run of 6,453 mph (2885 m/s or 10430 km/h), or Mach 8.5 on 30 April 2003.

=== 49th Wing ===
The 49th Wing is the host unit at Holloman Air Force Base, supporting national security objectives with mission-ready MQ-9 Reapers, Air Transportable Medical Clinic and BEAR (Base Expeditionary Airfield Resources) Base assets. The wing deploys combat-ready and mission-support forces supporting Air Expeditionary Force operations, Overseas Contingency Operations, and peacetime contingencies.

The 49th Operations Group supports national security objectives, as directed by the Joint Chiefs of Staff, by utilizing the Air Force's MQ-9 remotely piloted aircraft. The operational squadrons are:

- 6th Attack Squadron (MQ-9)
- 9th Attack Squadron (MQ-9)
- 16th Training Squadron (MQ-9)
- 29th Attack Squadron (MQ-9)
- 49th Operations Support Squadron

The Operations Group took over the activities of the inactivated 37th Fighter Wing at Tonopah Test Range Airport when the F-117As were transferred to Holloman in 1993. In addition to the 49th OG, other components of the 49th Wing are:

- 49th Maintenance Group: Maintains aircraft, propulsion, avionics and accessory systems for the F-16 C/D Fighting Falcon, T-38 Talon & MQ-9 Reaper.
- 49th Mission Support Group: Provides support to all base operations, personnel, and family members.
- 49th Medical Group: Provides medical services for active duty and retired military members and their families
- 49th Materiel Maintenance Group: Maintains and deploys all equipment needed to build a "BEAR base" airfield
- Detachment 1, 82nd Aerial Targets Squadron (From Tyndall AFB, Florida): Maintains and operates QF-16 Full Scale Aerial Target (FSAT) drone aircraft (Tail Code HD).

In February 2006, the Bush administration announced that Holloman would cease to be home to the F-117A Nighthawk. This move coincided with an announcement that the F-117 will be removed from service on or about 2008. On 1 March 2006, it was announced by the United States Air Force that Holloman would be the new home of two squadrons of F-22A Raptors. In May 2014, with the inactivation of the 7th Fighter Squadron, the F-22 mission ceased at Holloman. The Wing's F-22s were transferred to other F-22 wings to bolster their available aircraft.

=== 96th Test Group ===
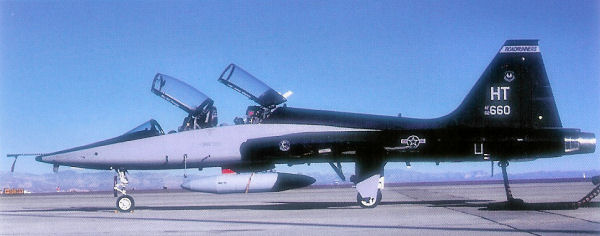
Northrop AT-38AB-45-NO Talon Serial 62-3660 of the 586th Flight Test Squadron (AFMC)

As of 18 July 2012, the 46th Test Group was 'reflagged' as the 96th Test Group, under the new 96 TW, stationed at Eglin Air Force Base, Florida. The 96th Test Group is an Air Force Materiel Command unit responsible for operational testing and evaluation of new equipment and systems proposed for use by these forces. Current initiatives include advanced self-protection systems for combat aircraft, aircrew life support systems, aerial reconnaissance improvements, new armament and weapons delivery systems, and improved maintenance equipment and logistics support.

Squadrons of the group have been:

- 586th Flight Test Squadron – Conducts flight testing
- 746th Test Squadron – Conducts Guidance/Navigational testing to include Internal Global Positioning Systems (GPS)
- 781st Test Squadron – National RCS Test Facility
- 846th Test Squadron – Rocket Sled Tests

Aircraft of the 96th Test Group carry the tail code "HT".

=== 54th Fighter Group ===
In March 2014 the 54th Fighter Group was reactivated at Holloman AFB, NM with a mission to train F-16 aircrew members and aircraft maintenance personnel. The 54th Fighter Group is a geographically separated unit of the 56th Fighter Wing, out of Luke AFB, Arizona.

Components:

- Operational Squadrons
  - 8th Fighter Squadron, 4 August 2017 – present
  - 311th Fighter Squadron, 1 March 2014 – present
  - 314th Fighter Squadron, 14 July 2015 – present
- Support Units
  - 54th Operations Support Squadron (OSS), 1 March 2014 – present
  - 54th Aircraft Maintenance Squadron (AMXS), 1 March 2014 – present
  - 54th Maintenance Squadron (MS), March 2014 – present

=== German Air Force Flying Training Center ===
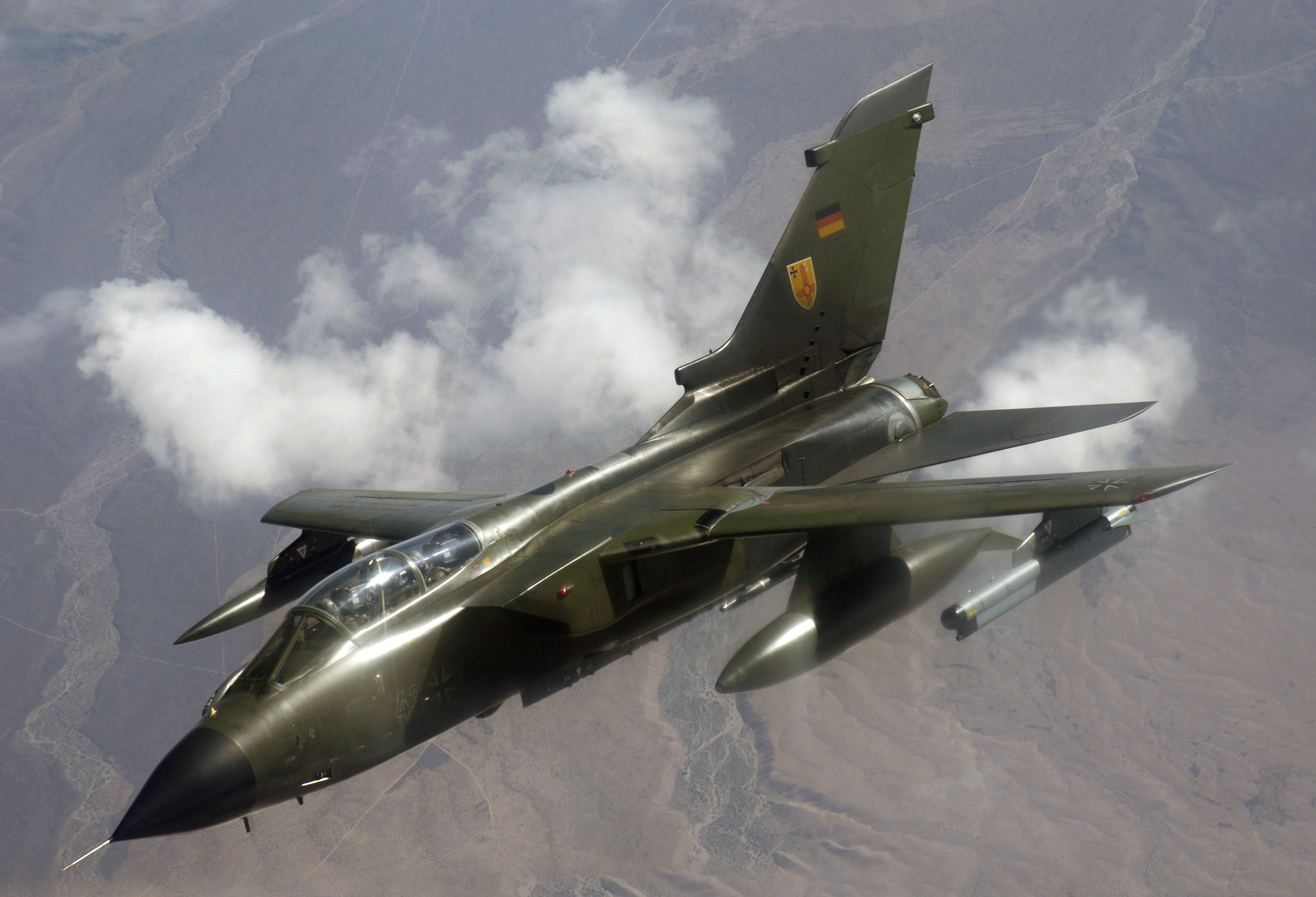
A Tornado showing the GAF/FTC emblem on the tail fin

In 1992 the German Air Force made Holloman its main pilot training center in the United States. Holloman was chosen due to its weather conditions.

On 1 May 1996, the German Luftwaffe established the German Air Force Tactical Training Center at Holloman.

The German Air Force Tactical Training Center activated at Holloman 1 May 1996. With the activation, 300 German military personnel and 12 Panavia Tornado aircraft joined Team Holloman. German aircrews come to Holloman for approximately three weeks for advanced tactical training and then return to Germany. The German Air Force also conducts a Fighter Weapons Instructor Course for the Tornado. Aircrews for this course come to Holloman for about six months.

As of November 2006 there are 650 German military personnel and 25 Tornado aircraft assigned to Holloman AFB.

There are numerous reasons the German Air Force trained at Holloman. The area offers great flying weather and has suitable air space. Other reasons are the proximity of Holloman to the German Air Force Air Defense Center at Fort Bliss, Texas, and the centralizing of German aircrew training at a single location. To facilitate this, there is a memorandum of understanding between the two governments.

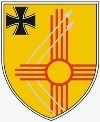
COA of the German Air Force Tactical Training Center

By offering NATO allies the benefits of available space at Holloman as well as the use of the Southwest's excellent flying weather, the U.S. can help maintain the strength of NATO's forces without the expense of forward-basing U.S. forces in great numbers overseas.

On 29 September 1999, two Luftwaffe Tornados crashed near Marathon Indian Basin, about 15 miles (24 km) northwest of Carlsbad. The crash was investigated by Holloman AFB 49th Wing Safety and German Air Force Safety personnel. Both pilots successfully ejected, and were uninjured.

In September 2004, Luftwaffe chief of staff, Klaus-Peter Stieglitz announced a reduction in its training program of roughly 20%.

In March 2013, it was announced that German Air Force units at Fort Bliss will transfer to Holloman later that same year; this was to end the German Air Force presence at Fort Bliss dating back to 1956. In 2015, due to funding constraints on the planned new facilities in Europe, the German Air Force Air Defense school was to stay open at Fort Bliss until 2020. On March 13, 2019, after 27 years in southern New Mexico, the German Luftwaffe ceased flight training at Holloman AFB.

=== Housing Afghan refugees ===
Following the 2020–2021 U.S. troop withdrawal from Afghanistan, the Biden administration housed some Afghan refugees in military bases across the country. Up to ~5,000 Afghan refugees at a time were temporarily held at Holloman while awaiting residency processing, with a total of 7,221 having residence at Aman Omid village.

== Based units ==
Flying and notable non-flying units based at Holloman Air Force Base.

Units marked GSU are Geographically Separate Units, which although based at Holloman, are subordinate to a parent unit based at another location.

=== United States Air Force ===
Air Combat Command (ACC)

- Fifteenth Air Force
  - 49th Wing (Host Wing)
    - Headquarters 49th Wing
    - 49th Comptroller Squadron
    - 49th Operations Group
      - 6th Attack Squadron – MQ-9A Reaper
      - 9th Attack Squadron – MQ-9A Reaper
      - 16th Training Squadron
      - 29th Attack Squadron – MQ-9A Reaper
    - 49th Maintenance Group
      - 49th Maintenance Squadron
      - 49th Aircraft Maintenance Squadron
      - 49th Maintenance Operations Squadron
    - 49th Medical Group
      - 49th Aerospace Medicine Squadron
      - 49th Medical Operations Squadron
      - 49th Medical Support Squadron
    - 49th Mission Support Group
      - 49th Civil Engineer Squadron
      - 49th Communications Squadron
      - 49th Contracting Squadron
      - 49th Force Support Squadron
      - 49th Logistics Readiness Squadron
      - 49th Security Forces Squadron
    - 54th Fighter Group
      - 8th Fighter Squadron – F-16C/D Fighting Falcon
      - 54th Operations Support Squadron
      - 54th Training Squadron
      - 311th Fighter Squadron – F-16C/D Fighting Falcon
      - 314th Fighter Squadron – F-16C/D Fighting Falcon

Air Force Reserve Command (AFRC)

- Tenth Air Force
  - 926th Wing
    - 726th Operations Group
      - 429th Attack Squadron (GSU) – MQ-9A Reaper
  - 944th Fighter Wing
    - 944th Operations Group
      - Detachment 1 (GSU)

Air Force Materiel Command (AFMC)

- Air Force Test Center
  - Arnold Engineering Development Complex
    - 96th Test Wing
      - 704th Test Group (GSU)
        - 586th Flight Test Squadron – C-12J Huron and T-38C Talon
        - 704th Test Support Squadron
        - 746th Test Squadron
        - 846th Test Squadron
- Air Force Sustainment Center
  - 635th Supply Chain Operations Wing
    - 635th Materiel Maintenance Group (GSU)
      - 635th Materiel Maintenance Squadron
      - 635th Materiel Maintenance Support Squadron

Air Combat Command (ACC)

- US Air Force Warfare Center
  - 53rd Wing
    - 53rd Test and Evaluation Group
      - 82nd Aerial Targets Squadron
        - Detachment 1 (GSU) – QF-16C Fighting Falcon
- Ninth Air Force
  - 93rd Air-Ground Operations Wing
    - 3rd Air Support Operations Group
      - 3rd Weather Squadron
        - Detachment 3 (GSU)
- Sixteenth Air Force
  - 557th Weather Wing
    - 2nd Weather Group
      - 2nd Weather Squadron
        - Detachment 4 (GSU)

== Missile testing sites ==
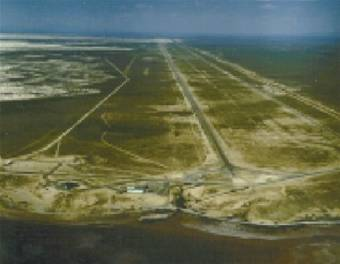
Rocket Sled Track at Holloman AFB

Missile testing at Holloman began in 1948. Holloman is known to have been used for 147 major launches from 1948 to 1959, reaching up to 235 kilometers altitude.

- Holloman NATIV/Navaho launch complex. (32°53′11″N 106°04′31″W)

The North American Test Instrumentation Vehicle program took place between January–November 1948. Twenty launches were made, six were successful. Program terminated in 1949. SM-64 Navaho missile planned but not tested.

- Holloman Able-51/ZEL (32°52′47″N 106°03′38″W)

The Able-51/ZEL site was used to test a MGM‐1 Matador cruise missile in December 1948.

- Holloman Aerobee (32°53′43″N 106°04′17″W)

Launches of Aerobee sounding rockets. First use 2 December 1949. Last launch 24 June 1959.

- Holloman SLED/Snark launch complex. (32°55′35″N 106°08′27″W)

Used for testing SM-62 Snark. First use 21 December 1950. Last launch 28 March 1952.

- Holloman JB-2 launch complex (32°53′33″N 106°07′24″W)

Used for testing Republic-Ford JB-2 cruise missile. First use 3 May 1948. Last launch 10 January 1949.

== Demographics ==
As of the census of 2000, there were 2,076 people, 393 households, and 380 families residing on the base. The population density was 165.7 inhabitants per square mile (64.0/km^{2}). There were 427 housing units at an average density of 34.1 per square mile (13.2/km^{2}). The racial makeup of the base was 73.3% White, 13.2% African American, 0.6% Native American, 2.8% Asian, 0.6% Pacific Islander, 6.4% from other races, and 3.1% from two or more races. Hispanic or Latino people of any race were 12.4% of the population.

There were 393 households, out of which 67.2% had children under the age of 18 living with them, 88.8% were married couples living together, 4.6% had a female householder with no husband present, and 3.3% were non-families. 2.8% of all households were made up of individuals, and 0.3% had someone living alone who was 65 years of age or older. The average household size was 3.29 and the average family size was 3.34.

On the base the population was spread out, with 25.0% under the age of 18, 37.0% from 18 to 24, 33.9% from 25 to 44, 3.7% from 45 to 64, and 0.4% who were 65 years of age or older. The median age was 22 years. For every 100 females, there were 152.2 males. For every 100 females age 18 and over, there were 180.4 males.

The median income for a household on the base was $37,206, and the median income for a family was $37,941. Males had a median income of $20,359 versus $15,425 for females. The per capita income for the town was $13,568. About 8.3% of families and 11.1% of the population were below the poverty line, including 16.8% of those under age 18 and none of those age 65 or over.

== Education ==
It is zoned to Alamogordo Public Schools.

The base hosts Holloman Elementary School (grades K-5), the zoned elementary school; and Hollomon Middle School (grades 6–8), the zoned middle school, both named after the base. The mascot of the middle school is the falcon. Alamogordo High School is the school district's comprehensive high school.

Holloman Middle was formerly Hollomon Junior High School and originally held classes at barracks while the permanent facility was being established. Holloman Elementary opened in 1954. In 1956, 1959, 1965, and 1966 additions were built for the elementary.

When the personnel at the base asked for the school district to completely desegregate for the benefit of its black employees, c. 1949, the school system did so.

== Geography ==
Holloman is located in New Mexico's Tularosa Basin between the Sacramento and San Andres mountain ranges. The base is about 10 miles (16 km) west of Alamogordo, New Mexico, on U.S. Route 70; 90 miles (145 km) north of El Paso, Texas; and 70 miles (113 km) east of Las Cruces, New Mexico. The base covers 59,639 acres (24,135 ha) and is located at an altitude of 4,093 feet (1,248 m).

The base is also a census-designated place (CDP), which had a population of 2,076 at the 2000 census. According to the United States Census Bureau, the town has a total area of 12.7 square miles (33 km^{2}), of which, 12.5 square miles (32 km^{2}) is land and 0.2 square miles (0.52 km^{2}) (1.18%) is water. The area of the air force base is 59,639 acres (241.35 km^{2}).

== Environmental contamination ==
The groundwater below Holloman Air Force Base near Alamogordo first tested positive for hazardous chemicals in 2016. Polyfluoroalkyl chemicals (PFASs) have been found in the groundwater below the base and in wells that were tested off-base.

== Archaeological site ==
An archaeological site that might shed more light on New Mexico’s ancient history has been discovered recently within the boundaries of the air force base. Base officials said geomorphologists and members of the 49th Civil Engineer Squadron environmental flight uncovered a campsite in early March 2024 that is about 8,200 years old and belonged to some of the state's first settlers.

== See also ==
- List of United States Air Force installations
- New Mexico World War II Army Airfields
