= 3200 =

3200 may refer to:

== In general ==
- 3200, a century leap year in the 4th millennium CE
- 3200 BC, a year in the 4th millennium BCE
- 3200, a number in the 3000 (number) range

== Products ==
- Atari 3200, a videogame console
- CDC 3200, a minicomputer
- Motorola International 3200, the first digital cellphone
- Nokia 3200, a cellphone

=== Vehicles ===
- 3200 horse power class tug, a Chinese navy tugboat class
- BMW 3200 CS, a sports car
- Maserati 3200 GT, a sports car
- Nord 3200, a military training aircraft

==== Rail ====
- 3200-series (CTA), a rail car class
- GWR 3200 Class, a steam locomotive class
- Keisei 3200 series (2025), an electric multiple unit train class
- Kintetsu 3200 series, an electric multiple unit train class
- Queensland Railways 3200 class, an electric locomotive class

== Military units ==
- 3200th Proof Test Group, of the U.S. Air Force
- 3200th Drone Squadron, of the U.S. Air Force
- 3200th Drone Group, of the U.S. Air Force

== Other uses ==
- 3200 Phaethon, a near-Earth asteroid, the 3200th asteroid registered
- Hawaii Route 3200, a state highway
- 3200 m/3200 meters, an athletics track and field running distance
- ISO 3200, a film speed

== See also ==
- A3200 road (Great Britain)
- PC2-3200, a type of DDR2 DRAM
- PC3200, a type of DDR1 DRAM
