= 3215th Drone Squadron =

- Active: 1951–1958
- Country: United States
- Branch: United States Air Force
- Role: Drone Operations

The 3215th Drone Squadron is a discontinued United States Air Force unit. It was last active with the 3205th Drone Group at Patrick Air Force Base, Florida, where it was discontinued on 22 December 1958.

== History ==
The squadron was first organized as the 3200th Target & Drone Squadron at Eglin Air Force Base in July 1951. It assumed the Boeing B-17 Flying Fortress drone aerial target mission that had been performed by elements of the 550th Guided Missiles Wing until December 1950. The squadron operated QB-17 drones and DB-17 controller aircraft, providing aerial targets for surface-to-air missile and air-to-air missile development programs at Eglin. The unit also used Lockheed QF-80 Shooting Star jets as aerial gunnery targets for Air Defense Command interceptor squadrons.

The squadron deployed elements to the Atomic Energy Commission (AEC) Nevada Test Site and Pacific Proving Grounds throughout the 1950s, flying drone Flying Fortresses though atomic and nuclear testing mushroom clouds with air sampling equipment and other instrumentation for post-detonation analysis.

In April 1956, with the development of the IM-99 Bomarc surface-to-air missile, the squadron moved its B-17 operations from Eglin to Patrick Air Force Base, Florida to support the Bomarc testing program. From Patrick, DB and QB-17s could take off and missiles could be test fired from Cape Canaveral Air Force Station Launch Complex 3 over the Atlantic Missile Range. One such trial on 23 October 1957 (Bomarc 624–11) saw the unarmed missile destroy a Flying Fortress target by a direct collision, more than 100 miles from the missile's launch point. The squadron discontinued its B-17 operations at Patrick, on 5 December 1958, but they were continued by the 3205th Drone Group, Detachment 1, which flew drone targets for Bomarc tests well into 1959. Once the IM-99A testing portion of the program was completed, drones were no longer required. The personnel of Detachment 1 departed for Eglin on 8 June 1959.

The squadron was discontinued on 22 December 1958.

=== Lineage ===
- Organized as the 3200th Target and Drone Squadron on 1 July 1951

Redesignated 3205 Target Drone Squadron on 1 December 1951
Redesignated 3215 Drone Squadron on 1 January 1953
Discontinued on 22 December 1958

=== Assignments ===
- 3200th Drone Group (later 3205th Drone Group), 1 July 1951 – 22 December 1958

=== Stations ===
- Eglin Air Force Base, Florida, 1 July 1951
- Patrick Air Force Base, Florida, 25 April 1956 – 25 October 1963

=== Aircraft ===
- Boeing QB-17L Flying Fortress (Drone Aircraft)
- Boeing QB-17N Flying Fortress (Drone Aircraft)
- Boeing DB-17P Flying Fortress (Director Aircraft)
- Lockheed DT-33 T-Bird (Director Aircraft)
- Lockheed QF-80 Shooting Star (Drone Aircraft)
