= 3205th Drone Group =

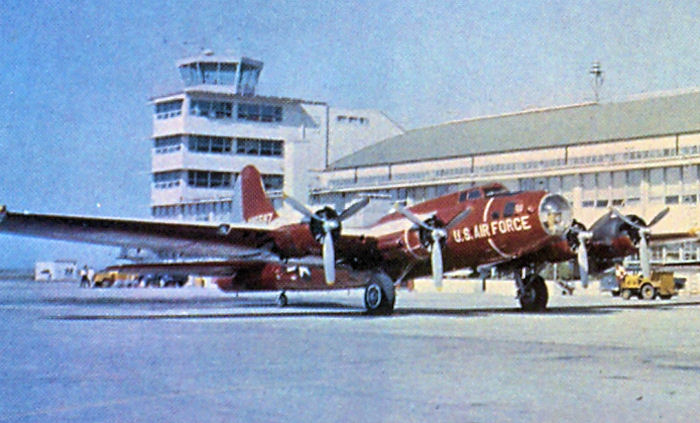
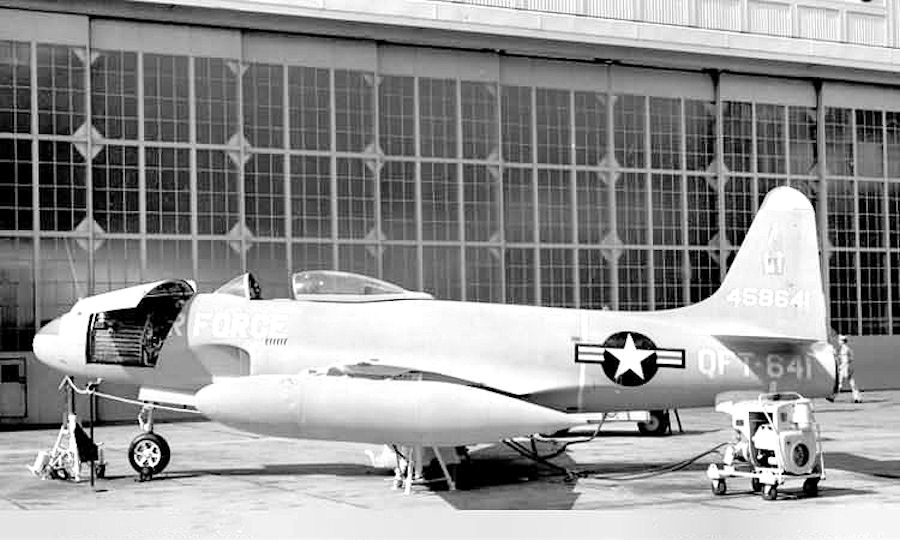
- Unidentified QB-17L Flying Fortress, 3225th Drone Squadron, Holloman AFB, New Mexico, 1959 Lockheed P-80B-1-LO Shooting Star 44-58641 as QF-80 drone, about 1952
- Active: 1950–1961
- Country: United States
- Branch: United States Air Force
- Role: Drone operations

The 3205th Drone Group is a discontinued United States Air Force unit that operated obsolete aircraft during the 1950s as radio-controlled aerial targets for various tests. It was the primary post-World War II operator of surplus Boeing B-17G Flying Fortress aircraft, and also operated Lockheed F-80 Shooting Star and a few Boeing RB-47 Stratojet bombers that were converted into drone aircraft during the early years of the Cold War. It was last active with the Air Proving Ground Center, based at Eglin Air Force Base, Florida, where it was discontinued on 1 February 1961.

A notable moment in the Group's history is that a Douglas DB-17P (Formerly B-17G-90-DL) 44-83684 of the unit's 3225th Drone Squadron flew the last operational mission by a USAF Flying Fortress on 6 August 1959.

== History ==
=== Origins ===
At the end of World War II, the B-17 Flying Fortress and B-24 Liberator were obsolete as strategic bombers, having been replaced by the Boeing B-29 Superfortress. B-24 production ended after the surrender of Germany in May 1945, B-17 production ended a month earlier, in April. Many of these new aircraft were simply not needed due to the fortunes of war, and most of them were sent directly from the factory to storage depots.

Initially, these unneeded aircraft were scheduled for scrapping and metal reclamation. These included thousands of war-weary combat aircraft returned from the overseas theaters. A few B-17s were sold to the civil marketplace, however most wound up in the smelters for aluminum recycling. The Army Air Forces, however, decided to retain several hundred new B-17s.

The postwar Air Force B-17s found uses as personnel and VIP transports (CB/VB-17), loaned to defense contractors for engine and weapons testing purposes (EB-17 and JB-17), for mapping (FB-17), for air-sea rescue (SB-17), for weather reconnaissance (WB-17), and for trainers (TB-17). All postwar B-17 conversions and ongoing depot-level maintenance was managed by the Middletown Air Depot at Olmsted Air Force Base, Pennsylvania.

Air Proving Ground Command obtained B-17s for guided missile launching and as aerial targets for new weapons systems. They were designated as follows:

- BQ-17 was the designation used for drone aircraft that would fly near or even through mushroom clouds during postwar atomic tests. Equipped with air sampling equipment and other technologies for monitoring the test.
- MB-17 was the designation assigned to aircraft used as airborne launchers for experiments with the VB-6 Felix, VB-3 Razon, VB-13 Tarzon guided gliding bombs and first-generation Republic-Ford JB-2 aerodynamic winged guided missiles. One bomb or missile was mounted under each wing of the aircraft. They were also used to launch small drones for airborne gunnery targets. One MB-17 survives, 44-83624 (See below).
- QB-17L was the designation assigned to drone aircraft equipped with radio, radar, television, and other equipment. They were usually painted in red-orange Day-Glo paint with black diagonal stripes for increased visibility. The QB-17N was a drone conversion similar to the QB-17L but with a different guidance system and not fitted with television cameras. The optical tracking equipment was installed in detachable wingtip pods equipped with explosive bolts and parachutes for recovery of test data in the event of the loss of the drone.
- DB-17 was the designation for B-17s converted as drone director aircraft. They would be used to guide the QB-17 target drones during the missile tests.

When they were worn out or the need was diminished, other postwar military B-17s would more often than not be sent to Middletown and converted to the QB-17 drone configuration. They would then be transferred to Proving Ground Command to be expended as aerial targets.

=== Predecessor units ===
In 1946, the 1st Experimental Guided Missiles Group was activated at Eglin Air Force Auxiliary Field #3, Florida. The unit's formation was a result of the Air Materiel Command's Engineering Division at Wright-Patterson AFB looking for places to allow its contractors to launch missiles. It was with this group that the DB-17/QB-17 Fortress Drone Director/Drone pairing was developed. In May 1946, sixteen B-17s were withdrawn from storage for conversion into drones with the addition of radio, radar, television, and other equipment. Six other Fortresses were converted as drone controllers.

On 13 January 1947 the group flew a QB-17 drone, guided by a director DB-17, from its base at Eglin to Washington, D.C., on a simulated bombing mission as a demonstration of capability. It also made preparations for operating QB-17s for the Operation Sandstone atomic bomb tests during April and May 1948. The group also picked up responsibility for drone QB-17 bombing tests (e.g., Operation Banshee)

The 550th Guided Missiles Wing was activated in 1949 as an expansion of the 1st Experimental Guided Missiles Group. The 1st Guided Missiles Squadron operated MB-17s, and the 2d Guided Missiles Squadron operated QB-17/DB-17s. Although based at Eglin Air Force Base, the wing established Detachment 1 at Holloman Air Force Base, New Mexico and Detachment 2 at Naval Air Station Point Mugu, California.

In 1949, the 2nd GMS tallied 3,052 flight hours without mishap and secured the green and white pennant denoting safety supremacy for USAF B-17 type aircraft for the fourth straight time, gaining permanent possession of the three-starred flag. The 550th GMW played a prominent part in the spring of 1949 in the aerial filming of "Twelve O' Clock High", filmed in part at Eglin AFB. By March 1950, the 2d Guided Missile Squadron, had 62 pilots manning 14 B-17s, three B-29s, and three QF-80A Shooting Stars, yellow-tailed drone aircraft used in the role of testing guided missiles.

The 550th wing moved to Patrick Air Force Base, Florida on 11 December 1950 as a result of a reorganization of Proving Ground Command into Air Research and Development Command and to facilitate the development of long-range atmospheric guided missiles using the Florida Missile Test Range.

=== 3205th Drone Group ===
The 3201st Air Base Support Squadron was activated at Eglin on 26 April 1950 from personnel and equipment assigned to the 2nd Guided Missiles Squadron. It assumed the QB-17/DB-17 drone aerial target mission. Redesignated the 3200th Drone Group on 1 June 1951, it took over the detachments at Holloman and Point Mugu. It participated in Atomic tests, Eniwetok Atoll, Marshall Island Group, Pacific 1950–1951

In July 1951, with the expansion to group level, several squadrons were activated to support operations. the 3205th and 3215th Drone Squadrons were activated at Eglin; the 3225th absorbed Detachment 1 at Holloman, which operated QB-17s and QF-80s over the Army White Sands Missile Range; the 3235th absorbed Detachment 2 at NAS Point Magu, which operated QB-17s over the Navy Pacific Missile Range Facility.

- The 3225th Drone Squadron at Holloman AFB supported the 6540th Missile Test Wing, which used the White Sands Range for testing numerous air-to-air missiles, using QB-17s as aerial targets. Also, the Army utilized drone Fortresses in Nike Ajax surface-to-air missile tests.
- The 3225th Drone Squadron at Point Mugu used the Fortresses as targets for Navy fighters that would intercept the drones over the Pacific with Hughes AIM-4 Falcon air-to-air missile.

Often, the QB-17 would be the subject of intentional near misses to preserve the drone for as many missions as possible. Other QB-17s were used for various unmanned but destructive tests such as the ditching tests carried out by NACA in San Francisco Bay.

In April 1956, with the development of the IM-99 Bomarc surface-to-air missile, the 3215th Drone Squadron was moved from Eglin to Patrick to support the Bomarc testing program. From Patrick, DB/QB-17s could take off and the missile could be test-fired from Cape Canaveral Air Force Station Launch Complex 3 over the Atlantic Missile Range. One such trial on 23 October 1957 (Bomarc 624-11) saw the unarmed missile destroy a Flying Fortress target by a direct collision, more than 100 miles from the missile's launch point.

However, the supply of QB-17s was dwindling in the late 1950s, and in any case the 1930s-designed B-17 could not realistically represent modern Soviet aircraft. This led to the refitting of two RB-47E Stratojets (53-4245, 53–4246) that were being phased out of the inventory to a QB-47E drone configuration. The QB-47s also carried electronic countermeasures gear and chaff dispensers in order to make for a more realistic target for the Bomarc during the tests. The Bomarcs were programmed to intentionally near-miss because the Stratojets were deemed too expensive to be intentionally destroyed in testing. However, one Stratojet drone did end up being shot down when an intended near-miss by a Bomarc turned into a hit.

=== F-80 drone operations ===
In parallel with the B-17 drone program, in 1946/47, three P-80A Shooting Star fighters were converted to radio-controlled drones in a test program to develop faster, more maneuverable aerial gunnery targets for the new generation of jet fighters entering the Air Force inventory. All armament was removed, and radio control equipment was installed. The pilot's controls were retained, which made it possible for the drone to be operated either manned or unmanned. Postwar funding and personnel shortages, however, led to the cancellation of this project.

The project was revived in 1951 when eight first-generation F-80As were converted to the QF-80 drone configuration at the Sacramento Air Depot, McClellan Air Force Base, California, under a project known as "Bad Boy." These aircraft were assigned to the 3205th Drone Squadron for testing over the Eglin range. A second batch of 14 QF-80s were converted in December 1953 at McClellan that featured larger center-mounted wingtip tanks equipped with cameras rather than fuel so that attacking aircraft could be photographed. These cameras could be jettisoned by remote control and lowered by parachute. In November 1953, 55 more F-80Cs were converted to the QF-80F drone configuration, with improved radio-control equipment and a runway arrestor hook. Ten dual-seat T-33A Shooting Star jet trainers were also converted to DT-33 drone director aircraft to guide the drones.

The drones were usually painted all red, but with natural metal finish on the top surfaces of both wings. Many QF-80s were operated as pilotless drones both at the Eglin as well as the Holloman test ranges. In addition, Several QF-80s were used for sampling of radioactive material from mushroom clouds of nuclear tests at the Atomic Energy Commission Nevada Test Site. The last of the QF-80 drones were still operating as aerial targets in 1962.

=== Inactivation ===
By 1958, the group's DB-17P Flying Fortresses were wearing out, and the number of available QB-17 drones was down to a handful. The wartime bombers were not designed or built for long-term use when new, and the supply of replacement parts was extremely limited, causing the aircraft to be very expensive to maintain. The aircraft had soldiered long past their estimated lifetimes and were gradually taken out of service and retired to the 2704th Air Force Aircraft Storage and Disposition Group at Davis–Monthan Air Force Base, Arizona. From the 2704th group the aircraft were sold to private owners or donated to aircraft museums (see below).

The last active USAF B-17 Flying Fortress, was a Douglas B-17G-90-DL, 44-83684. It was manufactured in Long Beach, California, being accepted by the USAAF on 7 May 1945. It was never assigned to an operational unit, instead being placed in long-term storage at South Plains Army Airfield, Lubbock, Texas in October. With the closure of South Plains AAF, the plane was flown to Pyote Army Airfield, Texas in July 1947 where it was stored by the 2753d Aircraft Storage Squadron. It was pulled from storage in March 1950 and flown to the Middletown Air Depot, Olmsted AFB, Pennsylvania, where it was inspected and modified to a DB-17G. On 18 July 1950 it arrived at Eglin AFB, Florida and was assigned to the 3201st Air Base Support Squadron.

The aircraft was deployed to the Pacific Proving Grounds where it was a support aircraft during the Operation Greenhouse nuclear tests beginning in April 1951. Upon its return to Eglin in June, it was sent to Detachment 1, 3200th Drone Group (later 3225th Drone Squadron) at Holloman. It was modified into a DB-17P at Olmsted Air Force Base in 1956.

The last flight from Eglin Air Force Base of a QB-17 was from Eglin Auxiliary Field No. 3 on 29 May 1958. The drone was sent out over the Gulf of Mexico as a target and was shot down. It was the last QB-17 at Eglin although the 3205th Drone Group still had two to three at Holloman Air Force Base and the same number at Patrick Air Force Base. The requiem for the plane came from Lt. Col. Walter W. Gannon, Deputy Commander of the Drone Group. He discussed the history of the Fortress as Col. Maurice C. Horgan, Commander of the 3205th. Drone Group and Lt. Col. John S. Sparks, Commander of the 3205th. Drone Squadron made a final test of the aircraft before it started its last nullo mission.

Aircraft 44-83684 remained and flew the last operational mission by a USAF B-17 on 6 August 1959 when it directed QB-17L 44-83717 from Holloman as a target for an AIM-4 Falcon air-to-air missile fired by an F-101 Voodoo. After the mission, a ceremony was held to commemorate the occasion. A few days later, it was flown to storage at Davis–Monthan.

With the retirement of the Flying Fortress, the group's activities were taken over by Headquarters, Air Proving Ground Center at Eglin in 1961. The program at Eglin went on to use QF-104A Starfighter drone aircraft until 1972, and subsequently was transferred to Tyndall Air Force Base, Florida as part of Aerospace Defense Command, for Aerospace Defense Command interceptor aircraft weapons targets using the Eglin range. Over the years, QF-102s (1973–1986), QF-100s (1981–1992) and QF-106s (1990–1998) have been converted into target drones.

Since August 1981 the target drone mission has been assigned to the 82d Aerial Targets Squadron, now part of the Air Combat Command, 53d Weapons Evaluation Group at Tyndall. The 82d operated retired QF-4 Phantom II aircraft (1997–2016) as target drones. The QF-4 saw a total of 238 aircraft being converted, the last of which was phased-out in 2016. In 2010 Boeing was awarded the contract to start initial work on converting the first six F-16A/Bs into aerial targets. These six aircraft are being used now as a testing platform. It is a mix of block 15/25/30 aircraft to show the feasibility of the modifications on these blocks.

=== Lineage ===
- Organized as the 3201st Air Base Support Squadron on 26 April 1950

Redesignated as 3200th Drone Group on 1 June 1951
Redesignated as 3205th Drone Group on 1 December 1951
Discontinued on 1 February 1961.

=== Assignments ===
- 3201st Air Base Group, 26 April 1950
- 3200th Proof Test Wing, 1 June 1951
- Air Proving Ground Center, 1 November 1951 – 1 February 1961

=== Components ===
- 3205th Drone Squadron, 1 July 1951 – 1 February 1961
- 3215th Drone Squadron, 1 July 1951 – 22 December 1958

Operated from Eglin AFB, Florida
Transferred to Patrick AFB, Florida, 25 April 1956 – 22 December 1958
Became "Detachment 1", 22 December 1958 – 8 June 1959

- Organized as "Detachment 1", 26 April 1950

Activated as: 3225th Drone Squadron, 1 January 1953 – 1 February 1961
Operated from: Holloman AFB, New Mexico

- Organized as "Detachment 2", 26 April 1950

Activated as: 3235th Drone Squadron, 1 July 1953 – 1 January 1957
Operated from: NAS Point Mugu, California

=== Stations ===
- Eglin Air Force Base, Florida

Operated from Duke Field (Eglin Air Force Auxiliary Field #3), 26 April 1950 – 1 February 1961

=== Aircraft ===
- DB-17P Flying Fortress (Director Aircraft)
- QB-17L Flying Fortress (Drone Aircraft)
- QB-17N Flying Fortress (Drone Aircraft)
- DT-33 Shooting Star (Director Aircraft)
- QF-80 Shooting Star (Drone Aircraft)
- QB-47E Stratojet (Drone Aircraft)

==== Survivors ====
- DB-17P 44-83514 (B-17G-85-DL) Manufactured March 1945. To storage 1945–1951. Withdrawn and modified to RB-17G then to DB-17G then to DB-17P. 3215th Drone Squadron (1951–1959). To MASDC 27 January 1959, Sold on civilian market, 31 July 1959. Converted to aerial firefighting tanker, registered as N9323Z. Sold to Confederate Air Force, 1977, restored to wartime configuration. Operates as 457th Bombardment Group "Sentimental Journey", Falcon Field, Mesa, Arizona, remains in flying condition.
- DB-17P 44-83525 (B-17G-85-DL) Manufactured March 1945. To storage 1945–1950. Withdrawn and modified to DB-17G status in 1950. 3205th Drone Squadron (1951–1959) To MASDC April 1959. Placed on static display at MASDC. Leased by Tallmantz Aviation in 1966. Restored to flight status and to wartime configuration. Registered as N83525. Flew in movies "1000 Plane Raid", Santa Maria, CA, January 1968 and "MacArthur" 1976. Sold to Junior Burchinal of Flying Tiger Air Museum in 1972. Sold to Weeks Air Museum in 1983. Ferried to Weeks Air Museum, Kendall-Tamiami Executive Airport, Florida 6 June 1987 airworthy. Heavily damaged during Hurricane Andrew, August 1992. Now in storage Fantasy of Flight museum, Polk City, Florida, disassembled.
- DB-17P 44-83542 (B-17G-85-DL) Manufactured April 1945. To storage 1945–1951. Withdrawn and modified to DB-17G. 3205th Drone Squadron (1951–1954), 3235th Drone Squadron (1954–1958) To MASDC December 1958. Sold on civilian market September 1959 with Aero Union Corp of Chico CA as N9324Z and used as fire bomber tanker No. 18. Crashed 12 July 1971 near Benson, Arizona. Became parts airframe, Chico, CA; some parts were stored at Davis Monthan AFB, AZ. Hulk sold to New England Air Museum, 1979. Sold to Fantasy of Flight museum, Polk, Florida about 1985. Currently plane partially restored and used as the basis for the display at museum named "Picadilly Princess", shown as 95th Bombardment Group B-17G-25-DL 42-37994 (Aircraft not complete) Configured as walk through exhibit/diorama.
- DB-17P 44-83559 (B-17G-85-DL) Manufactured April 1945. To storage 1945–1950. Withdrawn and modified to DB-17G and then to DB-17P. 3205th Drone Squadron (1950–1958) To MASDC, May 1958. Participated in Operation Greenhouse. Became museum display at Patrick AFB, Florida, 1958. Flown to SAC Museum at Offutt AFB, Nebraska, May 1959. On display as 96th Bombardment Group B-17F-65-DL 42-3474 (not flyable) at Strategic Air Command & Aerospace Museum. Has been on continuous display since 1959.
- DB-17P 44-83624 (B-17G-90-DL) Manufactured April 1945. To storage 1945–1950. Withdrawn and modified to MB-17G and then to TB-17G and then to DB-17G and then to DB-17P. 3205th Drone Squadron (1950–1957). Flown to USAF Museum in 1957, indoor display as DB-17P. Partially disassembled 1988, placed in storage at Wright Patterson AFB. Transferred to Air Mobility Command Museum, Dover AFB, Delaware, 1989. Now on display at Dover AFB Historical Center, Delaware shown as 381st Bombardment Group B-17G-35-DL 42-107112 "Sleepy Time Gal". In April 2012, the upper turret was restored to the aircraft.
- DB-17P 44-83684 (B-17G-90-DL) Manufactured May 1945. To storage 1945–1950. Withdrawn and modified to DB-17P. 3225th Drone Squadron (1950–1959) Last operational USAF B-17. To MASDC, August 1959. Sold September 1959 as N3713G and used in television and motion pictures. Used in 'Twelve O'Clock High' TV series as 'Picadilly Lily' and other productions. Grounded in 1975 due to engine issues. Sold 1975 to Planes of Fame museum in Chino, CA. Placed on static display with various markings. Registration N3713G restored by FAA 30 October 2006 and now being restored to flying condition with sponsorship from Ruby's Diner chain. Currently in restoration status at Chino, California.
- DB-17P 44-83690 (B-17G-95-DL) Manufactured May 1945. To storage 1946–1950. Withdrawn and modified to DB-7G and then to DB-17P. 3215th Drone Squadron (1951–1956), 3235th Drone Squadron (1956–1959). Flown to MASDC, stricken from USAF inventory August 1960. Flown to Bunker Hill AFB, Indiana, 1961, grounded and placed on permanent static display. Various markings over the years. Remains on display at Grissom Air Museum, Grissom Air Reserve Base, Peru, Indiana. Shown as 305th Bombardment Group B-17G-10-BO 42-31255 "Miss Liberty Belle".
- DB-17P 44-85599 (B-17G-100-VE) Manufactured May 1945. To storage 1945–1951. Withdrawn and modified to EDB-17G then to DB-17G and then to DB-17P. 3225th Drone Squadron (1951–1959). 2d to last USAF B-17, flown to MASDC, August 1959. Sold 1960 to 96th Bombardment Group Memorial Association, placed on static display at Abilene Municipal Airport, Texas. Became badly deteriorated and USAF reclaimed and moved the aircraft to Dyess AFB in 1975 for restoration and protection. Currently on display at Linear Air Park, Dyess AFB Shown as 96th Bombardment Group B-17G-80-BO 43-38133 "Reluctant Dragon"
- DB-17P 44-85738 (B-17G-105-VE) Manufactured May 1945. In storage 1945–1946, withdrawn for Operation Crossroads tests 1946, assigned to 509th Composite Group. To Roswell AAF, New Mexico, July–August 1946. Flown to Patterson Field, Ohio, (Air Materiel Command) 1946. modified to DB-17G then to EDB-17G and then back to DB-17G. To 3205th Drone Squadron (1951–1958). Retired 5 August 1958, flown from Eglin AFB, Florida directly to Mefford Field Airport, Tulare, California, grounded and placed on static display. Neglected and vandalized during the 1960s, obtained by local AMVETS Post 56 in 1971 and moved to compound at Perry's Coffee House on private property. Returned to airport by direction of USAF Museum in 1981, began long restoration process. Currently exterior partially restored, interior gutted. Displayed as 379th Bombardment Group B-17G, still carries 44-85738 with "O" on tail, as obsolete aircraft.
