= Air Proving Ground Command =

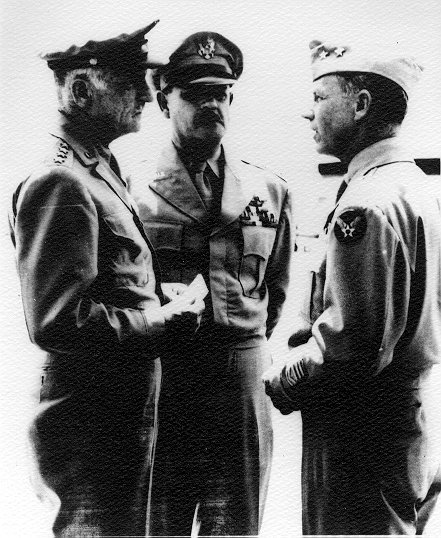
- Maj Gen Donald M. Wilson, first commander of Air Proving Ground Command, with Gen Carl Spaatz and Maj Gen Muir Fairchild
- Active: 1942–2012
- Country: United States
- Branch: United States Air Force
- Role: Test and Development
- Garrison/HQ: Eglin Field, later Eglin AFB, Florida

Insignia
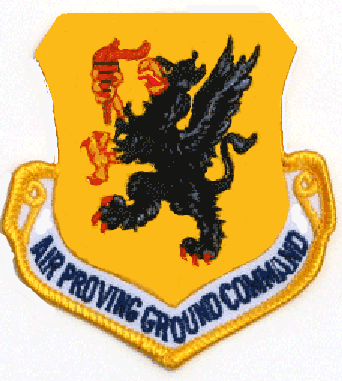
- Air Proving Ground Command emblem

The Army Air Forces Proving Ground Command (AAF PGC) was the primary testing command of the United States Army Air Forces (1946-47), and then the United States Air Force (1947-57).

In March 1946, the Army Air Forces Center was redesignated the AAF PGC, adding the responsibilities of a similarly named organization in June, when it moved to Eglin Field, Florida. It became the Army Air Forces' (later the United States Air Force's) primary testing command (except for a brief period in 1948, when it was part of Air Materiel Command) until 1957. In 1957 the PGC was redesignated the Air Proving Ground Center and re-assigned to Air Research and Development Command (ARDC). The APGC continued its mission thereafter as part of the ARDC.

From 27 October 1942, the School of Applied Tactics, later the AAF Tactical Center and then the AAF Center, was stationed at Orlando Army Air Base, Florida. The Centre was redesignated the AAF PGC on 8 March 1946 and, the same day, re-stationed to Eglin Field (later Air Force Base), Florida. It remained at Eglin AFB thereafter.

On 1 October 1998, the Air Force Development Test Center, as it had become, was redesignated the Air Armament Center. The Air Armament Center continued to carry out its tasks until it was inactivated on 1 October 2012.

== Lineage ==
- Established as Army Air Forces School of Applied Tactics on 27 October 1942, with major command status

Redesignated: Army Air Forces Tactical Center on 16 October 1943
Redesignated: Army Air Forces Center on 1 June 1945
Redesignated: Army Air Forces Proving Ground Command on 8 March 1946
Redesignated: Air Proving Ground Command on 10 July 1946
Redesignated: Air Proving Ground on 20 January 1948
Redesignated: Air Proving Ground Command on 29 December 1951
Redesignated: Air Proving Ground Center on 1 December 1957
Redesignated: Armament Development and Test Center on 1 August 1968
Redesignated: Armament Division on 1 October 1979
Redesignated: Munitions Systems Division on 15 March 1989
Redesignated: Air Force Development Test Center on 11 July 1990
Redesignated: Air Armament Center on 1 October 1998
Inactivated on 1 October 2012

== Assignments ==
- United States Army Air Forces, 27 October 1942
- Air Materiel Command, 20 January 1948
- United States Air Force, 1 June 1948
- Air Research and Development Command (later Air Force Systems Command), 1 December 1957
- Air Force Materiel Command, 1 July 1992 – 1 October 2012 (attached to Air Force Life Cycle Management Center after 18 July 2012)

== Components ==
Division

- Air Force Division, Joint Long Range Proving Ground, 1 December 1949 – 14 May 1951

Wings

- 550th Guided Missiles Wing, 20 July 1949 – 1 December 1950
- 3200th Maintenance Wing (later 3200th Test Wing), 1 July 1953 – 24 October 1955
- 3200th Proof Test Wing, 1 April 1951 – 1 July 1952
- 3201st Air Base Wing, 1 April 1951 – 1 July 1957
- 3202d Installations Wing, 1 July 1953 – unknown
- 3206th Support Wing (later 3206th Test Wing, 1 July 1953 – 1 July 1957

Groups

- 1st Experimental Guided Missiles Group, 6 February 1946 – 20 July 1949
- 3200th Proof Test Group (see 3200 Headquarters Squadron)

Squadrons

- 3200 Headquarters Squadron (later 3200th Proof Test Group), 1 July 1948 – 1 April 1951, 1 July 1952 – 1 July 1953
- 3201 Headquarters Squadron (later 3201 Air Base Group), 1 July 1948 – 1 April 1951

Base units

- 600th AAF Base Unit (later 600th AF Base Unit), 1 October 1947 – 9 July 1948
- 604th AF Base Unit, 16 January 1948 – 9 July 1948
- 605th AAF Base Unit (later 600th AF Base Unit), 1 October 1947 – 9 July 1948
- 607th AAF Base Unit (later 600th AF Base Unit), 1 October 1947 – 9 July 1948
- 609th AAF Base Unit (Airdrome Group) later 600th AF Base Unit), 1 January 1947 – 9 July 1948
- 610th AAF Base Unit (Proving Ground Complement, later Flight Test), 1 June 1946 – 1 August 1947
- 611th AAF Base Unit (Flight Test) (later 600th AF Base Unit (Proof Test Group)), 1 June 1946 – 9 July 1948
- 612th AAF Base Unit (Fixed Gunnery School), 1 June 1946 – 31 December 1946
- 615th AAF Base Unit, 1 August 1946 – 31 December 1946
- 902d AAF Base Unit (Facilities), 15 June 1946 – 20 Jul 1946
- 999th AAF Base Unit (AAF Tactical Applications Center), 1 June 1946 – 31 December 1946

== Bibliography ==
- Mueller, Robert (1989). Air Force Bases, Vol. I, Active Air Force Bases Within the United States of America on 17 September 1982 (PDF). Washington, DC: Office of Air Force History. ISBN 0-912799-53-6.
- Ravenstein, Charles A. (1984). Air Force Combat Wings, Lineage & Honors Histories 1947-1977. Washington, DC: Office of Air Force History. ISBN 0-912799-12-9.
