= 550th Guided Missiles Wing =

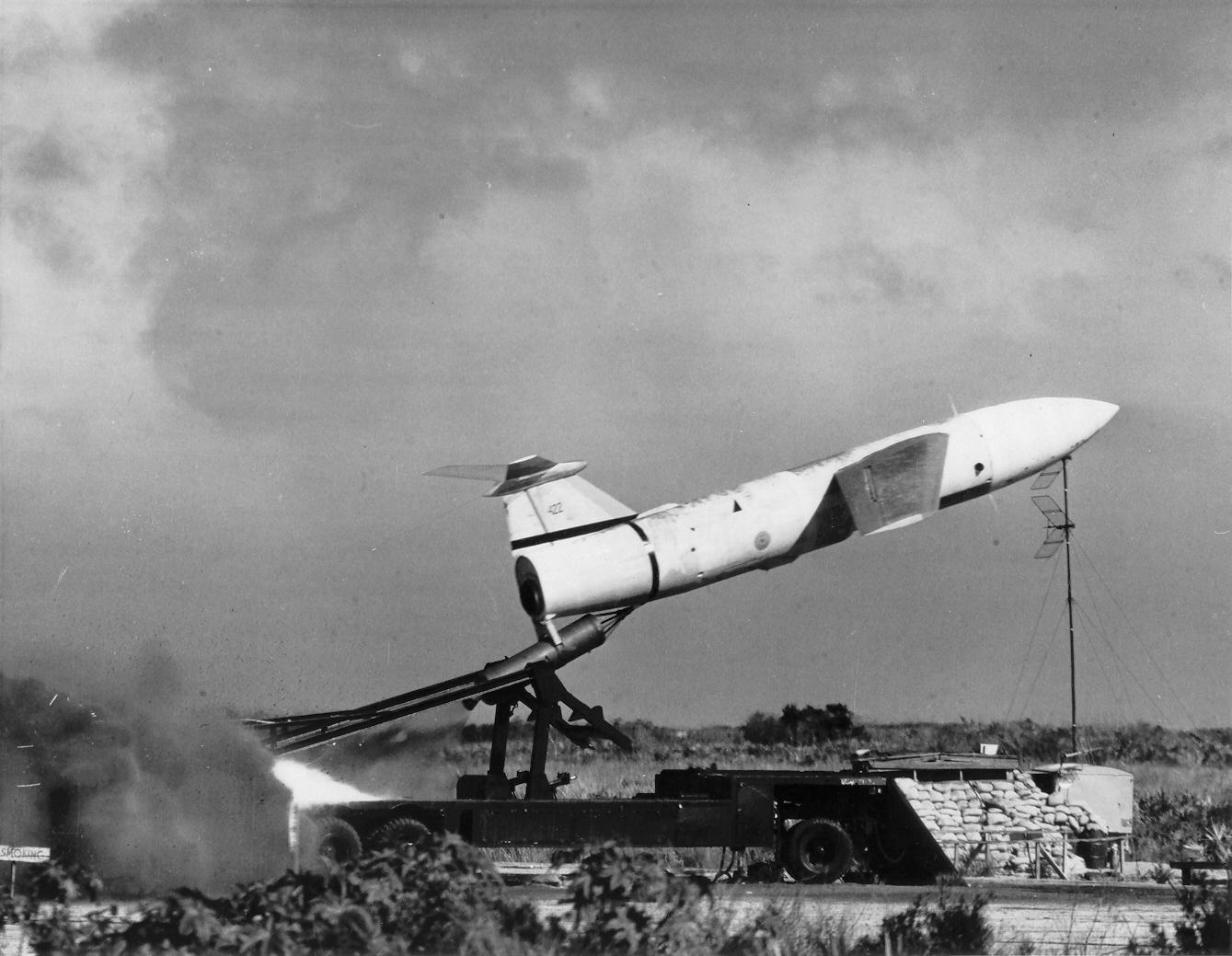
- B-61 Matador surface-to-surface cruise missile
- Active: 1949–1950
- Country: United States
- Branch: United States Air Force

The 550th Guided Missiles Wing is an inactive United States Air Force unit. It was last assigned to the Long Range Proving Ground Division at Patrick Air Force Base, Florida. It was inactivated on 30 December 1950. From 1949 through 1950 it was the Air Force's only experimental missile unit.

== History ==
Established as an expansion of the 1st Experimental Guided Missiles Group, the 550th Guided Missiles Wing was a short-lived unit of the Air Proving Ground, activated at Eglin Air Force Base, Florida. Its mission was the supervision and evaluation of guided missile service tests as opposed to pure experimentation of its predecessor unit.

As part of the 550th Wing, the former 1st Experimental Guided Missiles Squadron was inactivated; its personnel and equipment reorganized as follows:

- 1st Guided Missiles Squadron. Assigned the air-to-surface missiles and guided bomb testing program
- 2d Guided Missiles Squadron. Operated QB/DB-17 Flying Fortress drone/director aircraft drones as flying targets for the early Nike Ajax surface-to-air missile or for the Hughes Falcon air-to-air missile. Often, the QB-17L would be the subject of intentional near misses to preserve the drone for as many missions as possible. It also supplied B-17 drones to support the Atomic Energy Commission Nuclear Testing program.

The wing also included a headquarters squadron and a maintenance and supply squadron.

Like its predecessor, the 550th Wing had detachments in tenant status at Holloman Air Force Base and the Navy's Guided Missile Test Center at Naval Air Station Point Mugu. While the Holloman detachment continued to assist the Glenn L. Martin Company with developmental testing of the MX-771 Matador (i.e., it witnessed test firings and reported on the results), the Point Mugu detachment completed its Navy Convair Lark missile training and moved to the Joint Long Range Proving Ground in early January 1950

On 1 July 1950, the 3d Guided Missiles Squadron was activated at the Long Range Proving Ground Air Force Base (later Patrick Air Force Base), on the Atlantic Coast of Florida. Its mission was to support the aerodynamic missiles being developed by the Long Range Proving Ground Division. The squadron launched three US Navy SAM-N-2 Lark surface-to-air missiles at Cape Canaveral in October and November 1950.

The 550th Wing also continued its predecessor's support of the Atomic Energy Commission atomic bomb testing program. However, during the wing's brief existence, no tests were scheduled.

=== Inactivation ===
By January 1950, the Air Proving Ground decided the QB/DB-17 drone mission needed to be separated from the missile testing mission. It recommended the establishment of a separate and permanent drone squadron. Drone support personnel from the 2d Guided Missiles Squadron were subsequently transferred to a new unit, the 3201st Air Base Support Squadron, which was placed under the 3201st Air Base Group at Eglin. While the 3201st Air Base Support Squadron was attached to the 550th for administrative purposes, its operations were essentially divorced from the 550th's missile activities when the 3200th moved to Eglin Auxiliary Field #3. In June 1951, the 3201st Squadron was upgraded to a group level as the 3200th Drone Group.

By late 1950, Air Proving Ground decided to reorganize the missile testing program. The 550th Guided Missiles Wing was inactivated effective 30 December 1950. The wing moved to Patrick Air Force Base in early December. At Patrick, the resources of the 550th Wing were transferred to the new 4800th Guided Missile Wing, which consolidated all Air Proving Ground activities at the base.

The 1st Squadron terminated its gliding bomb mission and was inactivated. The 2d Guided Missiles Squadron was inactivated at Holloman, its resources moved to Patrick and on 10 April 1951 became the 4802d Guided Missiles Squadron. The personnel and equipment at Holloman Air Force Base became a detachment of the 3201st Air Base Support Squadron. The 3d Squadron already at Patrick was inactivated and transferred its mission, personnel and equipment to the 4803d Guided Missiles Squadron.

== Lineage ==
- Established as 550th Guided Missiles Wing on 27 June 1959

Activated on 20 July 1949
Inactivated on 30 December 1950

=== Assignments ===
- Air Proving Ground, 20 July 1949
- Long Range Proving Ground Division, 1–29 December 1950 (Note: The Air Force redesignated the wing as the 550th Tactical Missile Wing to activate at RAF Molesworth as a BGM-109G GLCM unit. This action was revoked, however and the 303d Tactical Missile Wing was activated instead.)

=== Components ===
- 3200th Proof Test Group, 26 April-11 December 1950
- 1st Guided Missiles Squadron, Air to Surface Missile, attached 20 July 1949 – 31 July 1950, assigned 1 August–30 December 1950
- 2d Guided Missiles Squadron, Surface to Surface Missile, attached 20 July 1949 – 31 July 1950, assigned 1 August–30 December 1950
- 3d Guided Missiles Squadron, Interceptor, 1 August 1950 – 30 December 1950
- 550th Maintenance Squadron, Guided Missiles, 20 July 1949 – 30 December 1950
- 3200th Drone Squadron, attached 26 April 1950 – 30 June 1950, assigned 1 July–1 December 1950, 1 July-1 December 1950

=== Stations ===
- Eglin Air Force Base, Florida, 20 July 1949
- Patrick Air Force Base, Florida, 11–30 December 1950

Detachments:

- Detachment 1: Naval Air Station Point Mugu, California, 21 July 1949 – 31 January 1950
- Detachment 2: Holloman Air Force Base, New Mexico, 7 November 1949 – 25 October 1950
- Detachment 3: Patrick Air Force Base, Florida, 6–11 December 1950

=== Aircraft ===
- Boeing B-17 Flying Fortress (1949-1950)

DB-17 Flying Fortress: Drone director aircraft
MB-17 Flying Fortress: Airborne missile/gliding bomb launcher
QB-17 Flying Fortress: Unmanned drone aircraft used as aerial weapons targets

- Boeing B-29 Superfortress (1949-1950)
- Lockheed T-33 T-Bird (1950)
- Lockheed F-80 Shooting Star
- North American F-86 Sabre (1950)

=== Missiles ===
- SAM-N-2 Lark
- MX-771 Matador
- SAM-A-1 GAPA
- AAM-A-2 Falcon
- Bell X-9 Shrike
- ASM-A-2 RASCAL
- SM-62 Snark
- SSM-A-5 Boojum

== See also ==
- List of United States Air Force missile squadrons
