= 3235th Drone Squadron =

- Active: 1953–1957
- Country: United States
- Branch: United States Air Force
- Role: Drone operations

The 3235th Drone Squadron is a discontinued United States Air Force unit. It was last active with the 3205th Drone Group, based at NAS Point Mugu, California. It was discontinued on 1 January 1957.

== History ==
Organized as "Detachment 2", 3201st Air Base Support Squadron, on 26 April 1950, Mission was to maintain and operate provide services and material to support operations of aviation activities and units. Operated QB/DB-17 Flying Fortress drone/director aircraft drones as flying targets for the Naval Point Mugu developmental and evaluation tests.

The unmanned B-17 drones were guided by pilots flying in mothership B-17s and the drone aircraft were used as target practice by fighter jets using missiles. Since the missiles they used were without warheads the drones, when hit, were guided back to the ground. They were then repaired and reused for other missions, including ground to air attacks.

Inactivated in 1957 with the end of the B-17 target drone program.

=== Lineage ===
- Organized as 3235th Drone Squadron on 1 July 1953

Discontinued on 1 January 1957

=== Assignments ===
- 3205th Drone Group, 1 July 1953 – 1 January 1957

=== Stations ===
- NAS Point Mugu, CA. 1 July 1953 – 1 January 1957

=== Aircraft ===
- DB-17P Flying Fortress (Director Aircraft)
- QB-17L Flying Fortress (Drone Aircraft)
- QB-17N Flying Fortress (Drone Aircraft)
