= 3205th Drone Squadron =

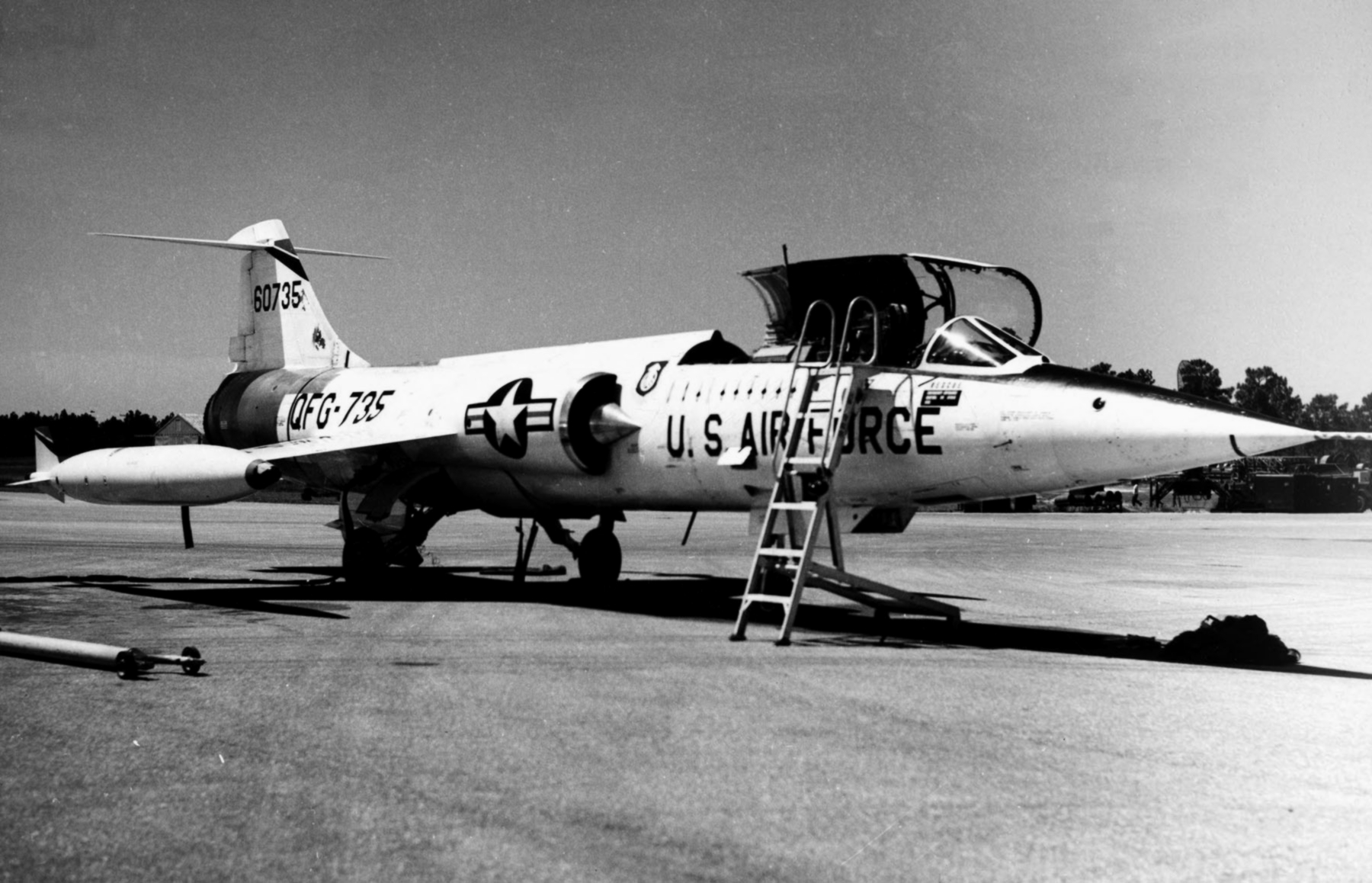
- Lockheed QF-104A of the 3205th Drone Squadron
- Active: 1950-1963
- Country: United States
- Branch: United States Air Force
- Role: Drone operations
- Decorations: Air Force Outstanding Unit Award

Insignia
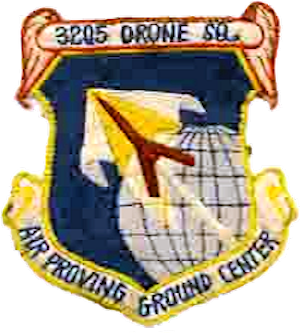
- Patch showing 3205th Drone Squadron emblem

The 3205th Drone Squadron is a discontinued United States Air Force unit. It was last active with the Air Proving Ground Center based at Eglin Air Force Base, Florida, where it was discontinued on 25 October 1963. The squadron operated various drones between 1950 and 1963 to provide targets to support development of weapons and for interceptor training.

== History ==
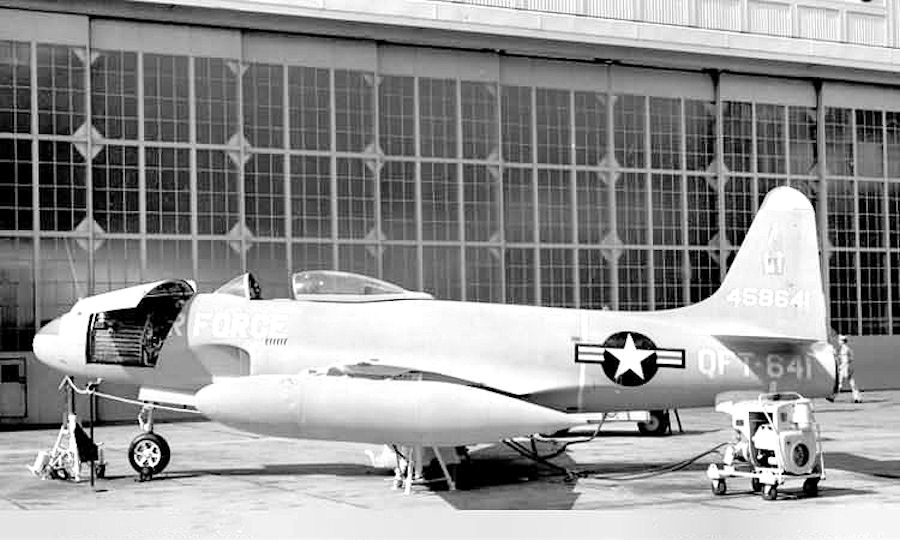
Lockheed QF-80 drone at Eglin AFB

The 3205th Drone Squadron was organized in April 1950, when it assumed the mission of operating QB-17L Flying Fortresses as drone aerial targets from the 550th Guided Missiles Wing. The squadron operated QB-17 drones and DB-17 controller aircraft, providing aerial targets for surface-to-air and air-to-air missile development programs at Eglin Air Force Base, Florida. The unit also used QF-80 Shooting Star jets for aerial gunnery targets for Air Defense Command interceptor squadrons.

The squadron deployed elements to the Atomic Energy Commission (AEC) Nevada Test Site and Pacific Proving Grounds during the 1950s, flying drone Flying Fortresses equipped with air sampling equipment and other instrumentation through atomic and nuclear testing mushroom clouds for post-detonation analysis. This support for nuclear testing ended in 1957, and the mission was taken over by the 4901st Support Wing (Atomic) at Kirtland Air Force Base, New Mexico.

In the late 1950s as the supply of drone B-17s began to become exhausted, the squadron began to use QB-47E Stratojets as gunnery targets for missile tests. It operated the QB-47 until the early 1960s. Approximately 10 B-47 aircraft were converted to drones. Test missiles were programmed for a near-miss rather than a hit on the drone in order to conserve the target drones for multiple flights.

Beginning in 1960, the squadron's QF-80 Shooting Star target drones were replaced by QF-104A Starfighters, modified F-104As that were deemed surplus to United States Air Force requirements. The QF-104s could be flown either by onboard pilots or by remote control from the ground or other aircraft. The replacement process was completed by July 1962.

The squadron was discontinued in late 1963 and its mission was taken over by USAF Tactical Air Warfare Center when the aerial target mission at Eglin was transferred from Air Force Systems Command to Tactical Air Command. QF-104 aerial targets were primarily used for air-to-air gunnery targets by Air Defense Command Convair F-102 Delta Dagger and F-106 Delta Dart interceptors. The drone mission continued at Eglin until June 1971, when it was transferred to Aerospace Defense Command's air-to-air weapons school at Tyndall Air Force Base, Florida.

=== Lineage ===
- Designated as the 3200th Drone Squadron and organized on 26 April 1950

Redesignated as 3205th Drone Squadron on 1 December 1951
Discontinued on 25 October 1963

=== Assignments ===
- 3200th Proof Test Group, 26 April 1950
- 550th Guided Missiles Wing, 1 July 1950
- 3200th Proof Test Group, 1 December 1950
- 3200th Proof Test Wing, 1 April 1951
- 3200th (later 3205th) Drone Group, 1 June 1951
- Air Proving Ground Center, 1 February 1961 – 25 October 1963

=== Stations ===
- Eglin Air Force Base, Florida, 26 April 1950 – 25 October 1963

=== Aircraft ===
Drone Aircraft

- QB-17L Flying Fortress
- QB-17N Flying Fortress
- QB-47E Stratojet
- QF-80 Shooting Star
- QF-104A Starfighter

Director Aircraft

- DB-17P Flying Fortress
- DT-33 Shooting Star
