= Kintetsu 3200 series =

Japanese train type

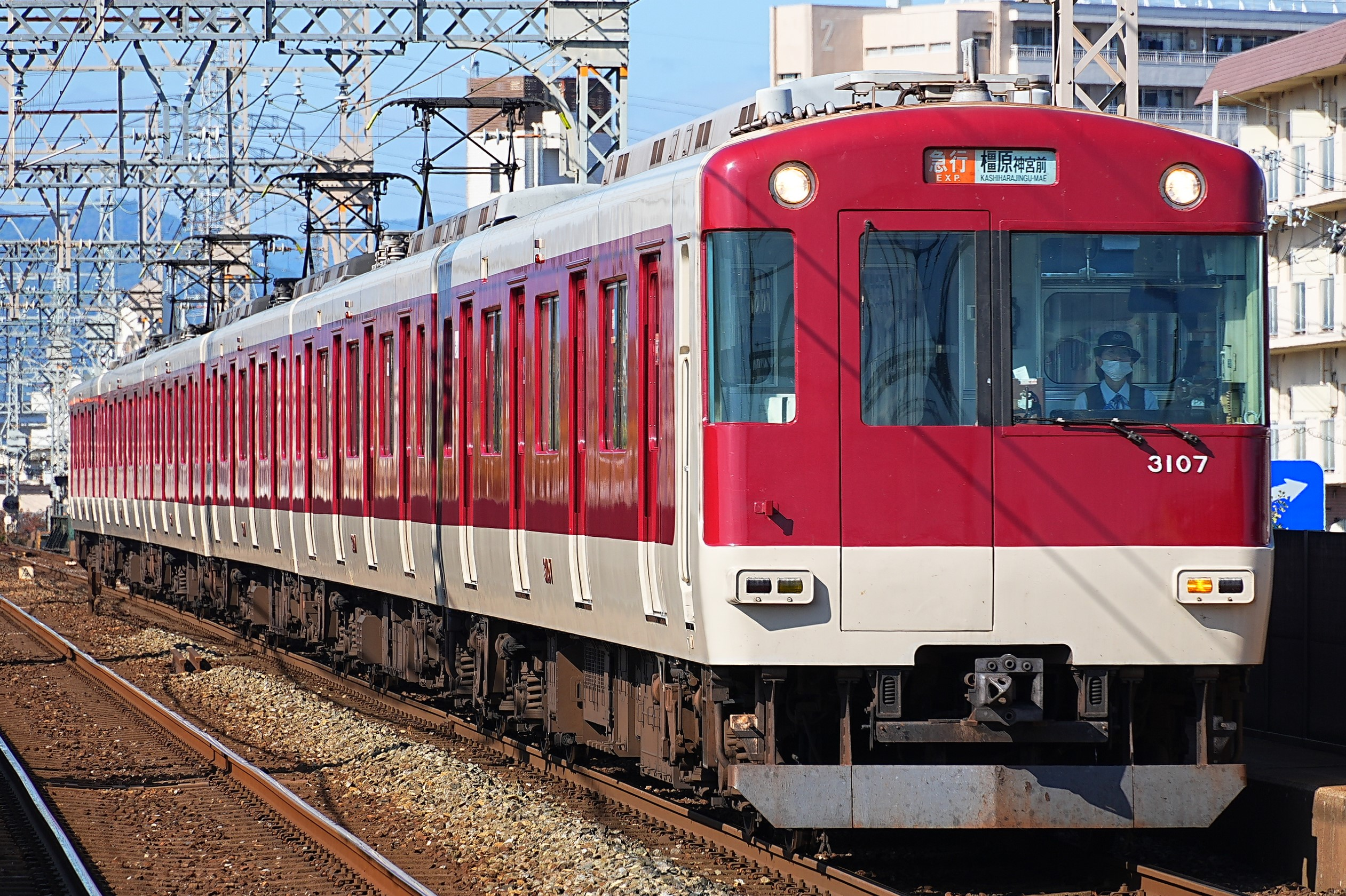
- A 3200 series train in November 2024
- In service: 1986 – Present
- Manufacturer: Kinki Sharyo
- Constructed: 1986–1988
- Entered service: 1 March 1986
- Number built: 42 vehicles (7 sets)
- Formation: 6 cars per trainset
- Fleet numbers: KL01 – KL07
- Operator: Kintetsu Railway
- Depot: Saidaiji
- Lines served: A Nara Line; A Namba Line; B Kyoto Line; B Kashihara Line; H Tenri Line; D Osaka Line; Karasuma Line

Specifications
- Car length: 20,500 mm (67 ft 3 in)
- Width: 2,800 mm (9 ft 2 in)
- Height: 4,040 mm (13 ft 3 in)
- Traction system: Variable frequency (GTO)
- Electric system: 1,500 V DC, overhead lines
- Current collection: Pantograph
- Bogies: KD-93 (motored); KD-93A (trailer)
- Safety systems: Kintetsu ATS (old/new); CS-ATC
- Track gauge: 1,435 mm (4 ft 8 1/2 in)

The Kintetsu 3200 series (近鉄3200系) is an electric multiple unit (EMU) train type operated by Kintetsu Railway in Japan.

== Formation ==
The trains are formed as six-car sets.

Car	1	2	3	4	5	6
Designation	Ku 3100	Mo 3200	Mo 3400	Sa 3300	Mo 3800	Ku 3100

== History ==
Six four-car sets were built between 1986 and 1987. The sets were lengthened in 1987 and 1988, and another six-car set was built in 1988.

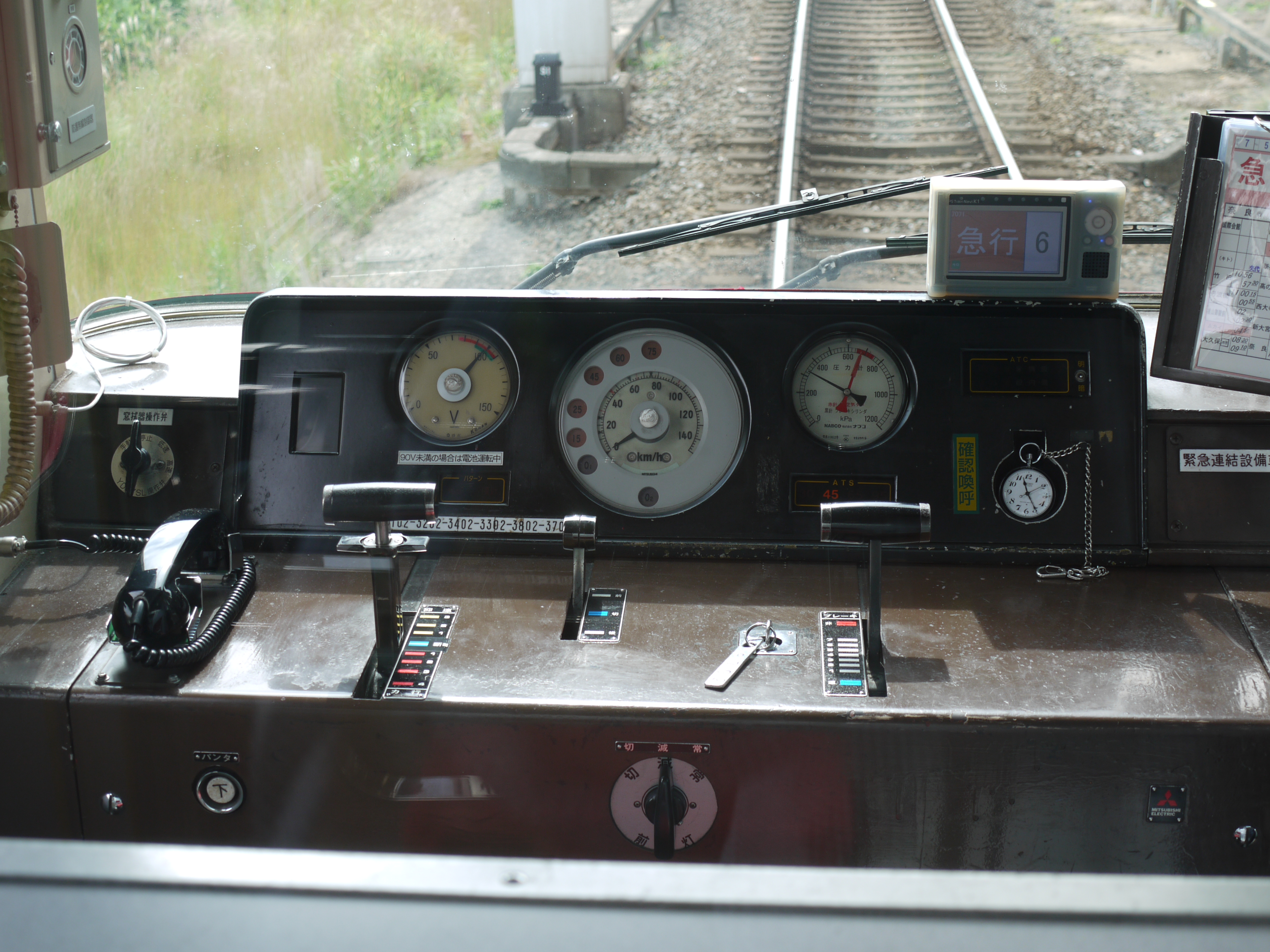
Kintetsu 3200 series cab

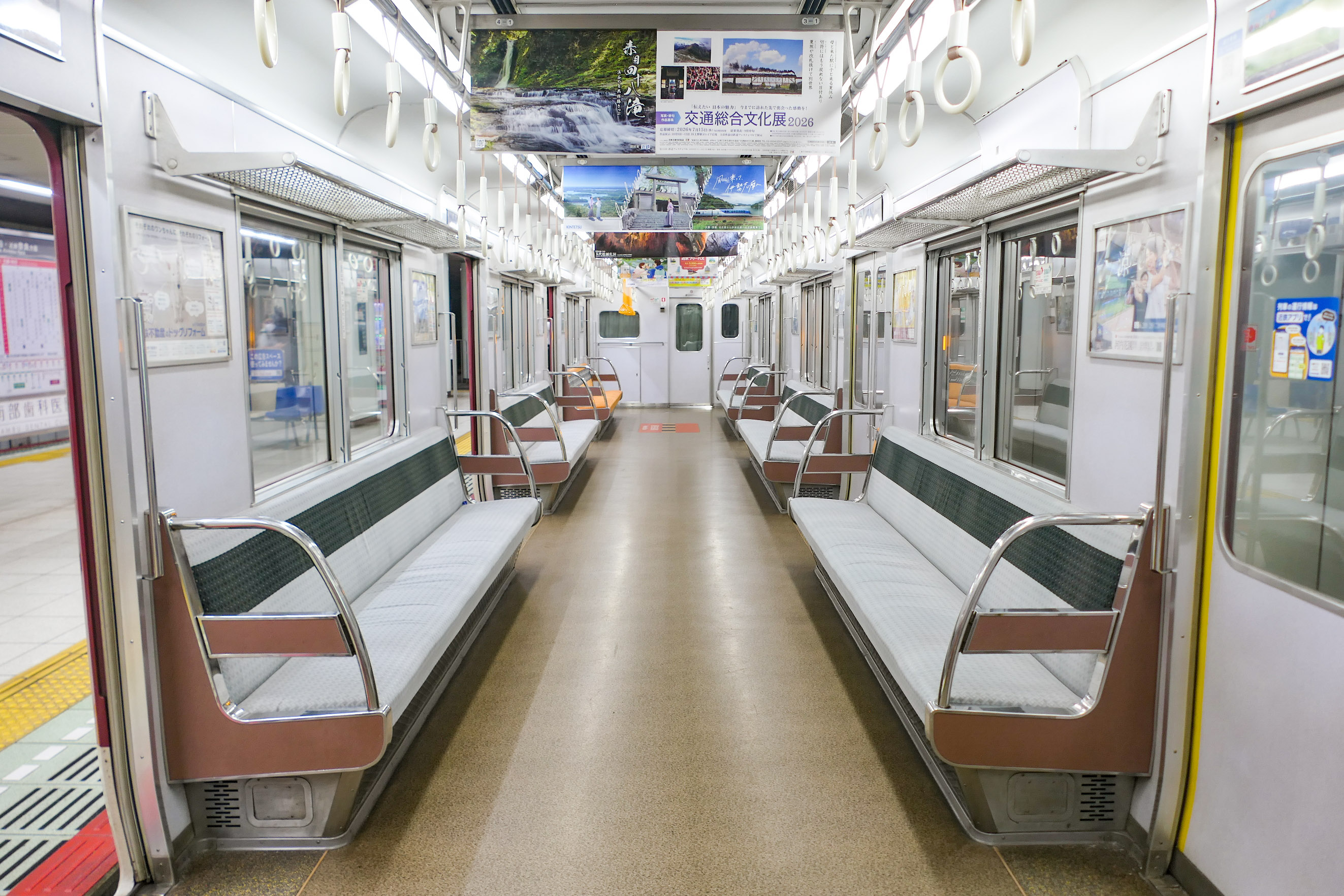
Interior view

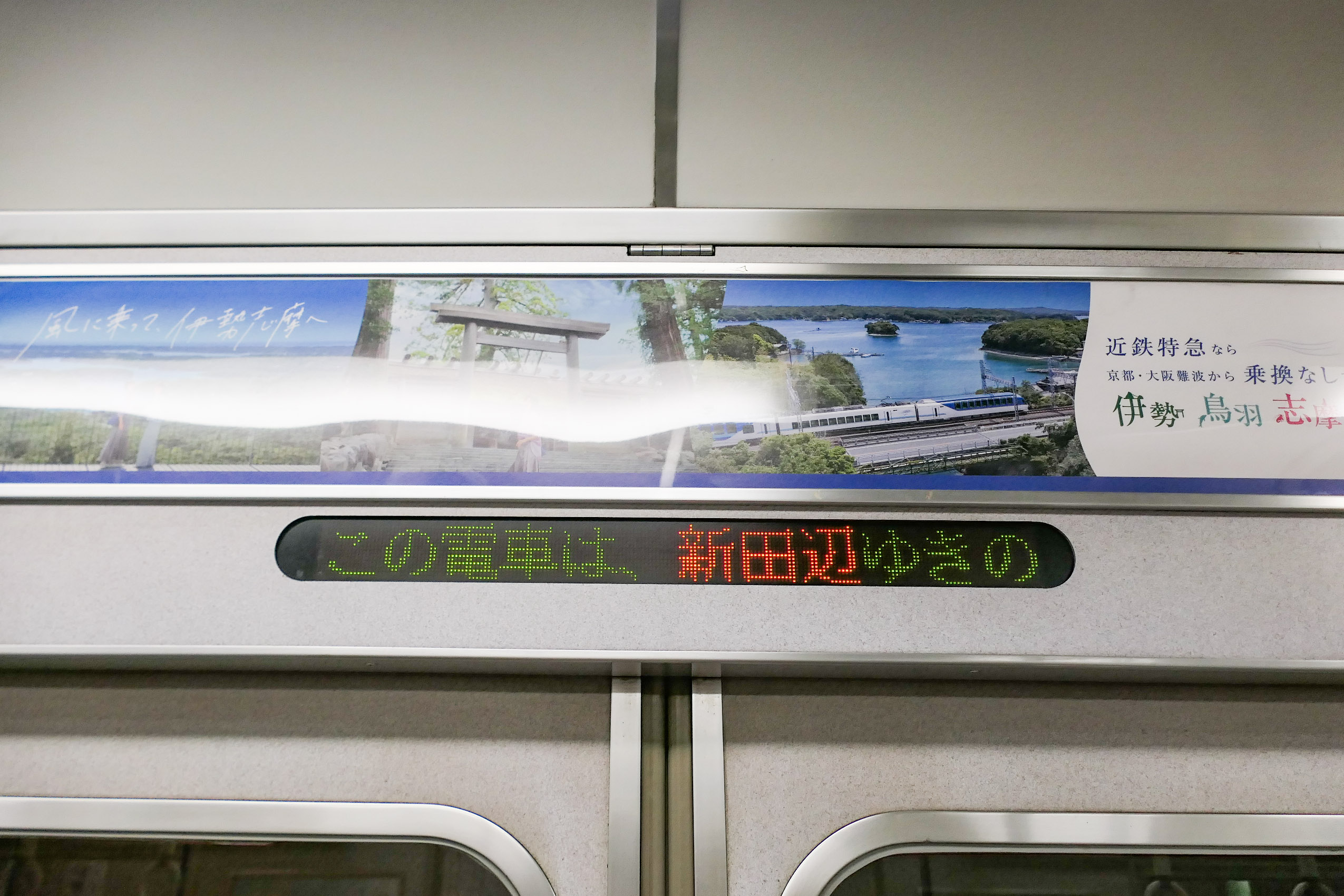
Passenger information display
