= Motorola International 3200 =

First digital hand-held mobile telephone

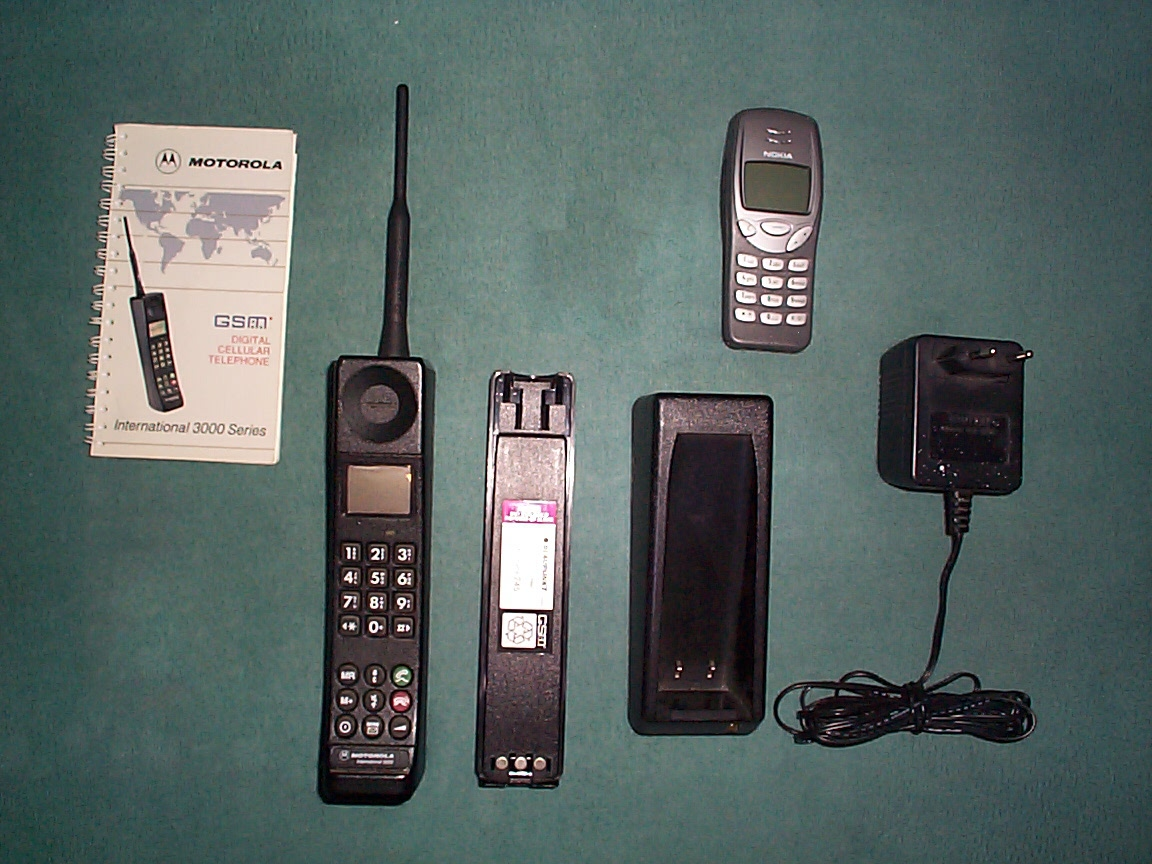
A Motorola International 3200 mobile phone (bottom), with its manual and charger, and also a Nokia 3210 phone for comparison (top).

The Motorola International 3200 was the first digital hand-held mobile telephone introduced in 1992, along with the more compact 5200, 5080, 7200 and 7500 "flip phones" introduced in 1994. It was preceded by the International 1000 and 2000 GSM phones, quite big (small portable suitcase), and although being the first GSM portable phones, they were not GSM certified, therefore couldn't be officially connected to the network (first to be certified was Orbitel TPU 900).

The International 3200 was designed to substitute the phones using the original analog cell technology developed in the late 1960s and early 1970s and first commercially available in 1983. Because of the 3200's GSM technology, units still operate on any current 900 MHz GSM networks operating to this day (not with 3G SIMs).

== Features ==
Like other mobile phones that preceded it, the 3200's shape (and size) resembled an elongated brick, with the numeric buttons on the narrow side, along with the earphone and microphone. In Germany, it was called knochen, due to the resemblance in shape between it and a bone. Designed to work solely in the GSM 900 MHz band, the flexible "rubber duck" antenna was two-thirds as long as the phone's case. The phone contained 21 buttons — the standard number pad, plus nine others:

- MR (Recall)
- a/c (Alpha/Clear)
- Call (Send)
- M+ (Store)
- Fcn (Function)
- End (End)
- Pwr (Power)
- Menu (Menu/SMS)
- Vol (Volume)

It was equipped with a 750mAh battery which required 5 hours to charge, the phone lasted 8 hours in Stand-by or 30 minutes (continuous, weak signal) to 1 hour (short calls, good signal) of talk time. A 1500mAh battery was also offered as an option, requiring 10 hours to charge, with 16 hours of stand-by time or up to 2 hours of talk time.

== Versions ==
Motorola also worked with Bosch to introduce the "Bosch Cartel S" phone. It was an identical copy of the Motorola International 3200, but with some cosmetic changes: it had white buttons and a Bosch battery, no charger plug, and no Motorola sign on its aerial. This model was sold in Germany as the first GSM mobile phone for the new GSM networks "D1 Telekom" and "D2 privat" launched in 1992, with a contract that in the year of its introduction, cost between 3,000 and 8,000 DM ( between € 2,355 and € 6,281 adjusted for inflation).

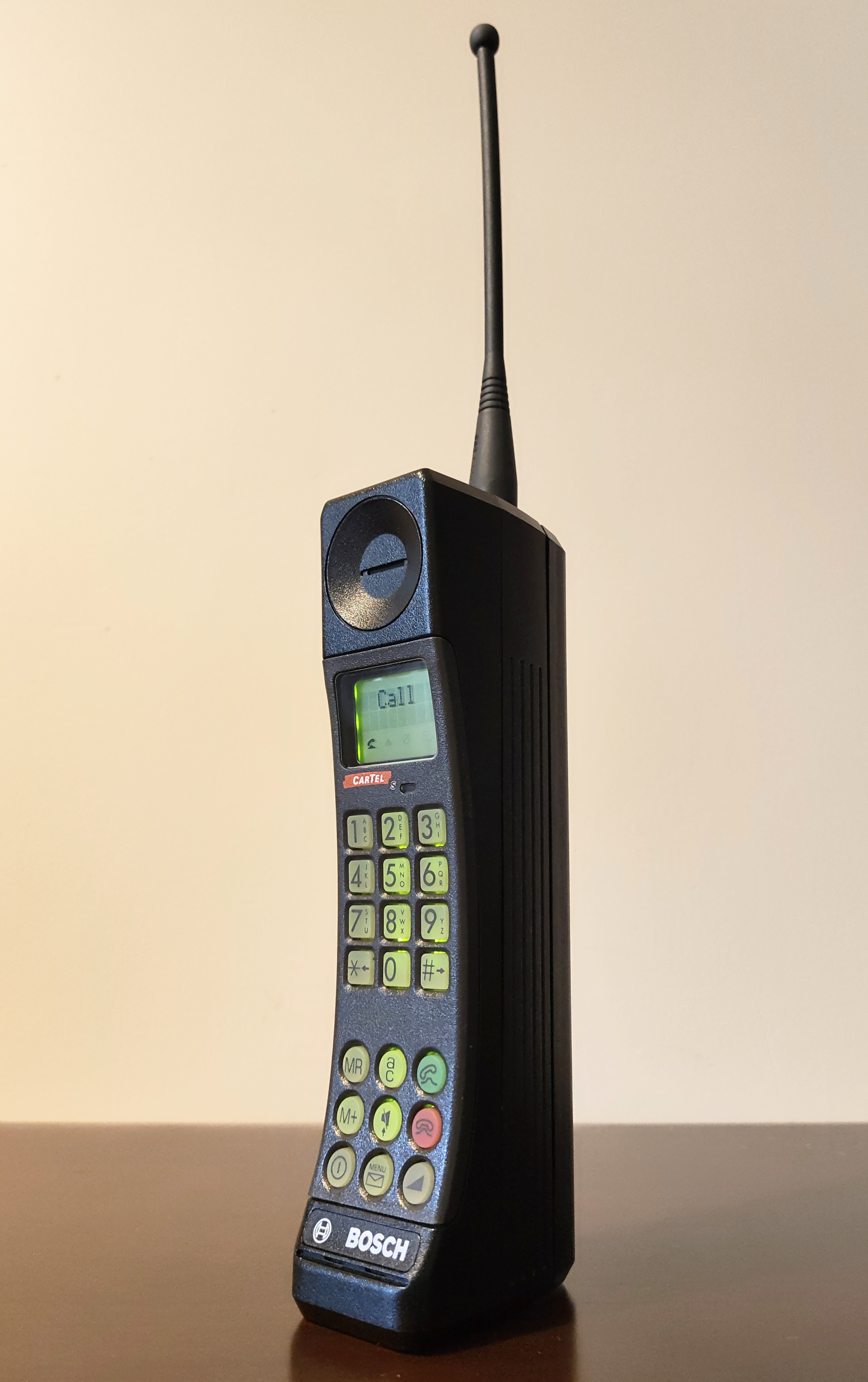
Bosch CarTel S - an early GSM 900 digital cellular telephone. It is a rebranded variant of the Motorola International 3200.

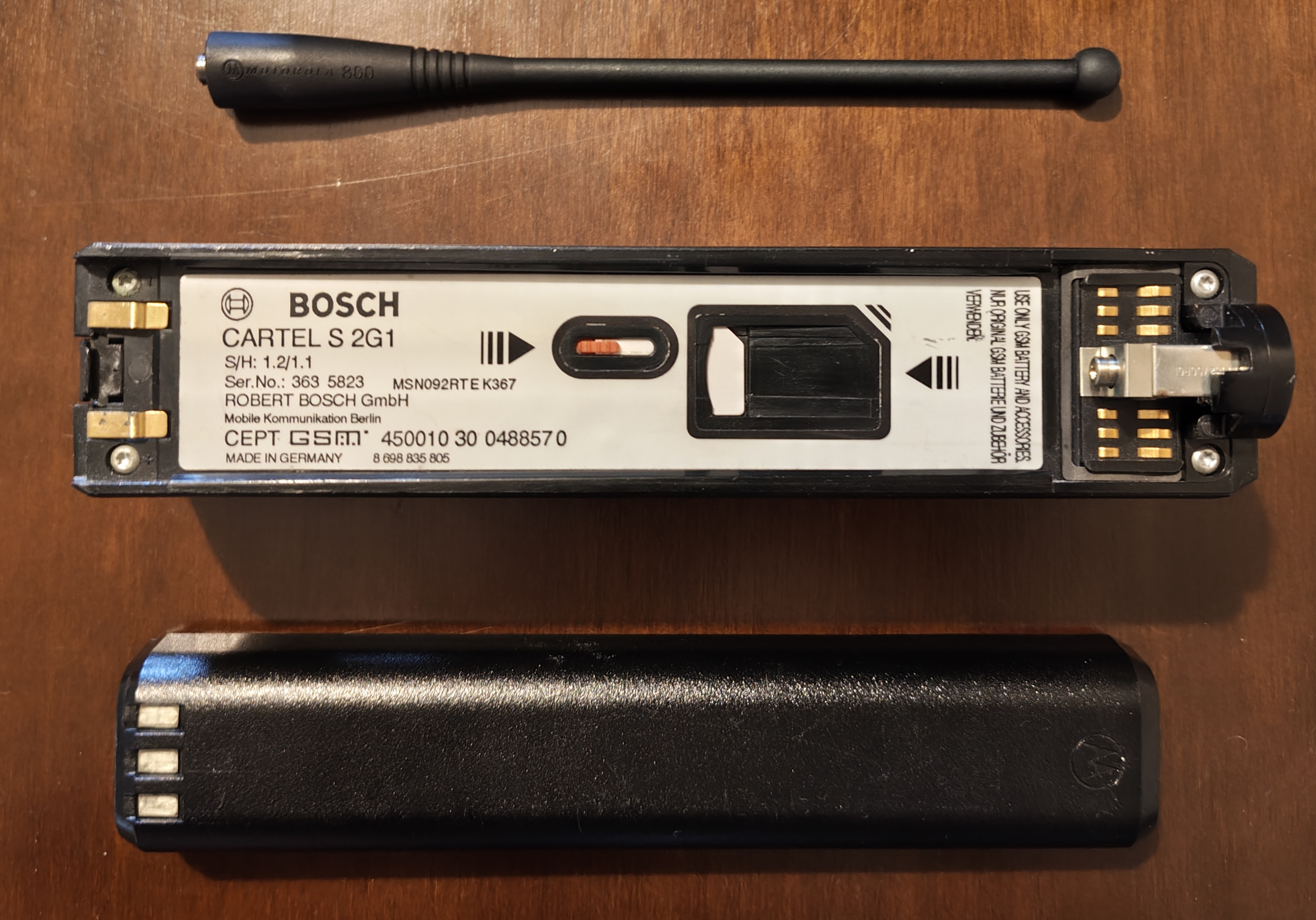

The International 3300 was an improved version, which could receive SMS and CB, the depth of the device was less and it could be charged directly without a charging cradle, unlike the 3200. The 3200 could neither receive nor send SMS messages since it was severely limited in what information it could show due to the small dot matrix LCD. Motorola was forced to replace the 3200 with the 3300, because the 3200 had only "Interim Type Approval" (ITA) and could not receive an "Full Type Approval" (FTA) to be approved for further operation in GSM networks due to the lack of SMS reception capability.

Motorola also manufactured other models of mobile telephones in the same "brick" style as the International 3200, such as the Motorola Ultra Classic, the DynaTAC 8000x/8500x/8800x, and the "California" phone.
