= Bell X-9 Shrike =

Experimental missile to test guidance and propulsion technology

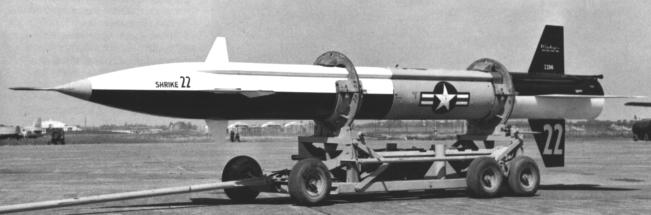
Bell X-9 on its trailer

The Bell X-9 Shrike was a prototype surface-to-air, liquid-fueled guided missile designed by Bell Aircraft as a testbed for the nuclear-armed GAM-63 RASCAL. It is named after the shrike, a family of birds.

== Testing ==
Thirty-one X-9 rockets were delivered, flying from April 1949 to January 1953. The program was used to gather aerodynamic and stability data, and to test guidance and propulsion systems for the RASCAL.

None of the missiles survived testing. The only known remaining fragment of an X-9 is part of a vertical stabilizer, at the Larry Bell Museum in Mentone, Indiana.

== Specifications (X-9) ==
General characteristics:

- Length: 22 ft 9 in (6.9 m)
- Wingspan: 7 ft 10 in (2.4 m)
- Diameter: 1 ft 10 in (0.56 m)
- Wing area: 70 ft^{2} (6.5 m^{2})
- Weight (empty): 2,125 lb (964 kg)
- Weight (loaded): 3,500 lb (1,588 kg)
- Propulsion: Bell XLR65-BA-1 liquid-fuel rocket engine, 3,000 lbf (13.3 kN) thrust

Performance:

- Maximum speed: Mach 2.0
- Range: 50 mi (80 km)
- Service ceiling: 12.3 mi (19.8 km)
- Rate of climb: m/min (ft/min)
- Wing loading: kg/m^{2} ( lb/ft^{2})
- Thrust/weight:

== See also ==
- Bell GAM-63, a related development
- List of experimental aircraft
