= Duhast-class tug =

Chinese naval auxiliary ship class

Class overview
- Operators: People's Liberation Army Navy

General characteristics
- Class & type: 3200-hp class tug
- Displacement: 2,300 t (2,300 long tons; 2,500 short tons)
- Length: 34 m (111 ft 7 in) o/a; 29.4 m (96 ft 5 in) w/l
- Beam: 10 m (32 ft 10 in)
- Draft: 3.5 m (11 ft 6 in)
- Depth: 4.5 m (14 ft 9 in)
- Propulsion: 2 × marine diesel engines, 1,800 hp (1,342 kW); 2 shafts
- Speed: 12 knots (22 km/h; 14 mph)
- Range: 1,500 nmi (2,800 km; 1,700 mi)
- Complement: 11
- Electronic warfare & decoys: None
- Armament: Unarmed
- Aircraft carried: None
- Aviation facilities: None

The Duhast class tug is a little known class of naval auxiliary ship currently in service with the People's Liberation Army Navy (PLAN), and this 3200-horsepower tug has received NATO reporting name Duhast class. Built by Wuhu Xinlian Shipbuilding Co., Ltd. (芜湖新联造船有限公司), formerly Wuhu Shipyard, since 2004, the name of this class is taken from the installed power of the vessels, with the exact type designation still remaining unknown. After the first pair was built, as of the mid-2010s, a total of twelve of this class have been confirmed as being in active service.

The 3200-horsepower class series ships in PLAN service are designated by a combination of two Chinese characters followed by three-digit number. The second Chinese character is Tuo (拖), meaning tug in Chinese, because these ships are classified as tugboats. The first Chinese character denotes which fleet the ship is service with, with East (Dong, 东) for East Sea Fleet, North (Bei, 北) for North Sea Fleet, and South (Nan, 南) for South Sea Fleet. However, the pennant numbers may have changed due to the change of Chinese naval ships naming convention.

Class	Pennant #	Status	Fleet
Duhast class	Bei-Tuo 633	Active	North Sea Fleet
Duhast class	Bei-Tuo 719	Active	North Sea Fleet
Duhast class	Bei-Tuo 720	Active	North Sea Fleet
Duhast class	Bei-Tuo 725	Active	North Sea Fleet
Duhast class	Bei-Tuo 726	Active	North Sea Fleet
Duhast class	Dong-Tuo 832	Active	East Sea Fleet
Duhast class	Dong-Tuo 876	Active	East Sea Fleet
Duhast class	Dong-Tuo 880	Active	East Sea Fleet
3200-hp class	Dong-Tuo 885	Active	East Sea Fleet
Duhast class	Nan-Tuo 180	Active	South Sea Fleet
Duhast class	Nan-Tuo 182	Active	South Sea Fleet
3200-hp class	Nan-Tuo 183	Active	South Sea Fleet
Duhast class	Nan-Shui 186	Active	South Sea Fleet
Duhast class	Nan-Shui 187	Active	South Sea Fleet
