= GAM-63 RASCAL =

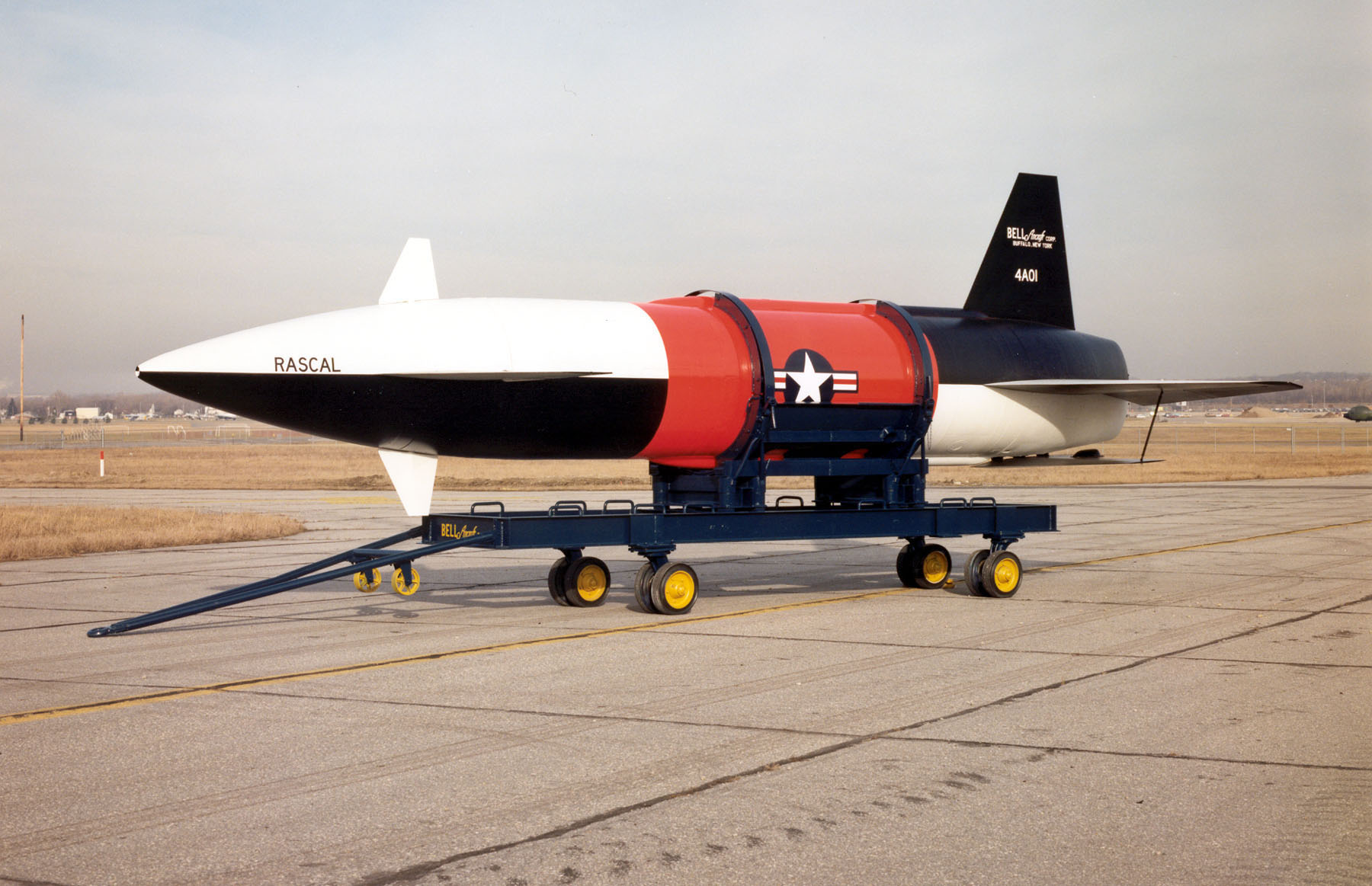
- Type: Air-to-surface missile

Service history
- In service: 30 October 1957 (planned)

Production history
- Manufacturer: Bell Aircraft
- Unit cost: $2,262,000
- Produced: 1952

Specifications
- Mass: 18,200 lb (8,255 kg)
- Length: 31 ft 11.5 in (9.74 m)
- Diameter: 4 ft (1.22 m)
- Wingspan: 16 ft 8.3 in (5.09 m)
- Warhead: W27 nuclear
- Detonation mechanism: Airburst or surface
- Propellant: Bell XLR-67-BA-1 liquid propellant rocket engine with 10,440 lb_{f} (46.4kN) of thrust
- Operational range: 100 miles (161 km)
- Flight ceiling: 65,000 ft (19,812 m)
- Maximum speed: 1,950 mph (3,138 km/h)
- Guidance system: GAM-63 - command guidance with radar imaging GAM-63A - inertial guidance/command with radar imaging
- Launch platform: B-36, B-50, and B-47

The GAM-63 RASCAL was a supersonic air-to-surface missile that was developed by the Bell Aircraft Company. The RASCAL was the United States Air Force's first nuclear armed standoff missile. The RASCAL was initially designated the ASM-A-2, then re-designated the B-63 in 1951 and finally re-designated the GAM-63 in 1955. The name RASCAL was the acronym for RAdar SCAnning Link, the missile's guidance system. The RASCAL project was cancelled in September 1958.

== Development ==
During World War II, Nazi Germany air-launched 1,176 V-1 missiles from Heinkel He 111 bombers. The United States Army Air Forces (USAAF) studied this weapon system. Testing was conducted in the United States using B-17 bombers and the Republic-Ford JB-2, a locally produced copy of the V-1. Successful testing of this combination led to the release of requirements to the aerospace industry for an air-to-surface missile on 15 July 1945.

On July 15, 1945, the USAAF published the military characteristics for an air-to-surface missile. The missile was to be launched from an aircraft at an altitude of 20,000 to 45,000 feet (6,100 to 13,700 m), must operate at a speed of at least 1,200 miles per hour (1,900 km/h) for a range of at least 100 miles (160 km). The missile be able to strike within 500 feet (150 m) of the target 75 percent of the time. Guidance could be either remotely or self-contained. This resulted in MX-767 Project Mastiff, which was to develop a nuclear armed air-to-surface drone or self-controlled air-to-surface missile. Northrop Corporation, Bell, and Republic Aviation were invited by the USAAF to submit proposals for Mastiff. Bell was awarded a feasibility study contract by the USAAF on 1 April 1946. Bell studied the feasibility of developing a subsonic "pilot-less" bomber carrying a substantial payload over a distance of 300 miles (480 km). After 18 months of study, Bell concluded that rocket propulsion was not capable of providing the performance needed to boost the missile the AAF wanted to a range of 300 miles. The range requirement was reduced to 100 miles (160 km) but other technical problems surfaced. The Rascal caught the attention of the journal Aviation Week in 1951 when it report “First practical application of the Bell X-1 supersonic research test plans as a military aircraft may be in an air-to-ground guided missile . . . which will probably be designated Rascal.

As a risk reduction measure the USAAF divided the program. Project MX-776 was divided into two sub projects as a risk reduction measure, MX-776A and MX-776B.

The MX-776A program developed the RTV-A-4 Shrike later re-designated the X-9 as a testbed for the later Rascal that would be developed under project MX-776B. MX-776A in itself was an ambitious program intended to not only develop aerodynamic, structural, guidance and propulsion information. The X-9 was also to develop the knowledge and skills required to check out and launch an air-to-ground missile. MX-776A was also to develop experience in training crews to maintain and deploy the new weapon. It was the intent of the Air Material Command that the Shrike could provide the USAF with a tactical weapon following the test program. The X-9 program was successful in that all essential goals were met. The X-9 program began using two rocket thrust chamber one built by Aerojet and the other by Solar. From flight of the 16th X-9 the rocket motor was a Bell XLR65-BA-1 The X-9 Shrike was flown with two different guidance systems. The first was a radio command guidance system manufactured by RCA's Federal Telecommunications Division. Later in the development program guidance was provided by a preset/radar command guidance system developed by Bell. The X-9 program also tested on three flights a warhead which dispersed chemical bomblets. The X-9 was one of the more successful of the early missile test programs resulting in the program being terminated well short of the originally intended number of flights. Twenty two X-9 missiles were launched between April 1949 and January 1953.

The intended mission for the RASCAL was the destruction of highly defended targets on routes to strategic targets. Only targets with well defined radar returns could be attacked by RASCAL.

== Design ==
In May 1947, the USAAF awarded the Bell Aircraft Company a contract for the construction of a supersonic air-to-surface missile compatible with the B-29 Superfortress, the B-36 bomber, and the B-50 Superfortress bomber. The missile was to have a range of 100 miles (160 km), Bell's development effort was led by Walter R. Dornberger. Rascal, was required to carry a 5,000 pound warhead a distance of 150 nautical miles at a speed of Mach 3.0 by July 1955. It was intended that the Rascal would be deployed on the B-50 and B-36.

The RASCAL design used the X-9's canard aerodynamic configuration and a rocket engine derived from the X-9's rocket-propulsion system. The RASCAL was larger than the X-9 with a fuselage that was 9 feet (2.7 m) longer and 2 feet (0.61 m) larger in diameter. The RASCAL's flight controls included forward and rear surfaces. Forward surfaces include fixed horizontal stabilizers and movable dorsal and ventral surfaces. Rear surfaces include wings with ailerons and fixed dorsal and ventral stabilizers. The aft lower stabilizer could be folded for ground handling.

The RASCAL was powered by a XLR67-BA-1 rocket engine also developed by Bell. The XLR-67 provided 10,440 pounds-force (46.4 kN) of thrust using three vertical in-line thrust chambers. All three thrust chambers of the XLR67 were operated during the missile's boost phase which could last up to two minutes. At the conclusion of the boost phase the upper and lower chambers of the XLR-67 were shut down and thrust was sustained by the center chamber alone. Fuel for the XLR-67 included 600 US gallons (2,300 L) of white fuming nitric acid oxidizer and 293 US gallons (1,110 L) of JP-4 jet fuel. The oxidizer was stored in a series of tube bundles instead of a spherical storage tank. It is believed this configuration was chosen because it weighed less than a spherical tank of the same volume. Propellant was provided to the thrust chambers by a turbine driven propellant pump. A gas generator powered the propellant pump. The propellants were glow plug ignited. Bell contracted with Purdue University for the glow plug ignition system. Aerojet provided the pump drive assemblies.

The RASCAL guidance system was developed jointly by Bell, Federal Communications/Radio Corporation of America (RCA) and Texas Instruments. The initial version of the control system provided an accuracy or circular error probable (CEP) of 3,000 feet (910 m). Adequate for a missile equipped with a nuclear weapon.

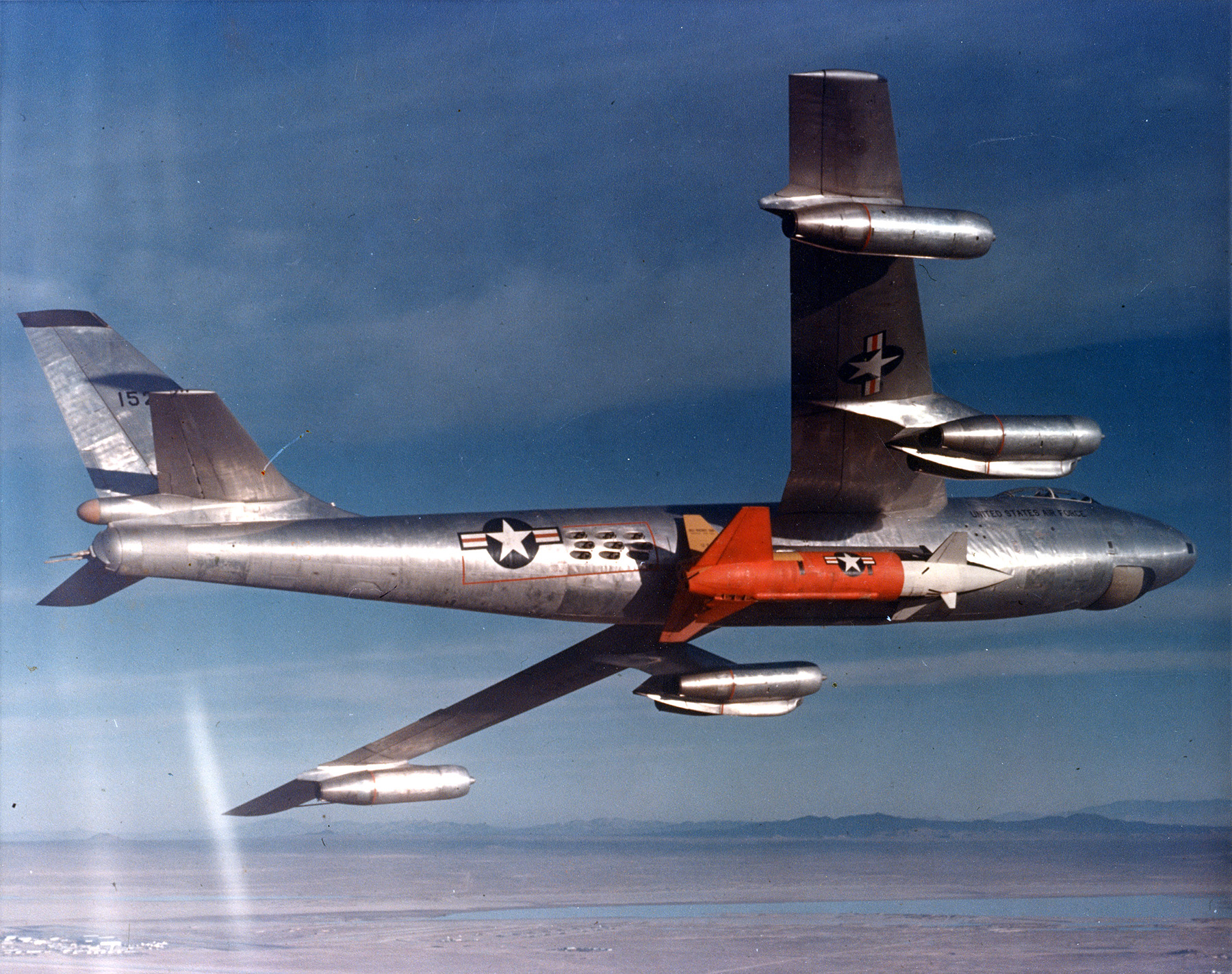
Rascal being carried by a modified B-47B

The bomber carrying the missile was modified with an additional antenna and equipment at the bombardier's position needed to guide the RASCAL. During the flight to the launch point, the bombardier transferred wind and navigation data periodically to the missile. Prior to launch the bombardier tuned a video relay receiver, altitude phasing, and adjusted the terminal guidance tracking indicator. Missile control surfaces were also checked to make sure they were functional.

Prior to the bomber taking off, the RASCAL was pre-programmed for a given flight path. Navigation to the intended launch point 90 miles from the target was determined by the DB-47E's MA-8 navigation system. Before launch the MA-8 fed the aircraft's velocity and heading to the missile. Following launch an inertial system guided the missile during launch, climb and mid-course phases of its flight. During the terminal dive a command guidance control system was used where the RASCAL was remotely controlled by the bombardier in the launching bomber. After launch, a lanyard connecting the RASCAL to the bomber was used to start the missile's rocket engine. In the event the lanyard failed an automatic timer would count down and start the engine. The RASCAL was air-launched above 40,000 feet (12,000 m). Terminal guidance was by radar imaging of the target which was transmitted back to the bomber. As the missile approached the target the detail in the radar video transmitted from the missile improved. The missile began a terminal dive about 20 miles (32 km) from the target. The command guidance system did not send a directional signal and was not encrypted which made it susceptible to detection and jamming.

The guidance system developed by Bell for the GAM-63A version of the RASCAL produced a CEP of 1,500 feet (460 m). The accuracy claims of the inertial guidance system have been questioned by sources., It was possible to drop the RASCAL as a gravity bomb if a system malfunction occurred in flight. In such case the missile would be used to attack a less heavily defended target.

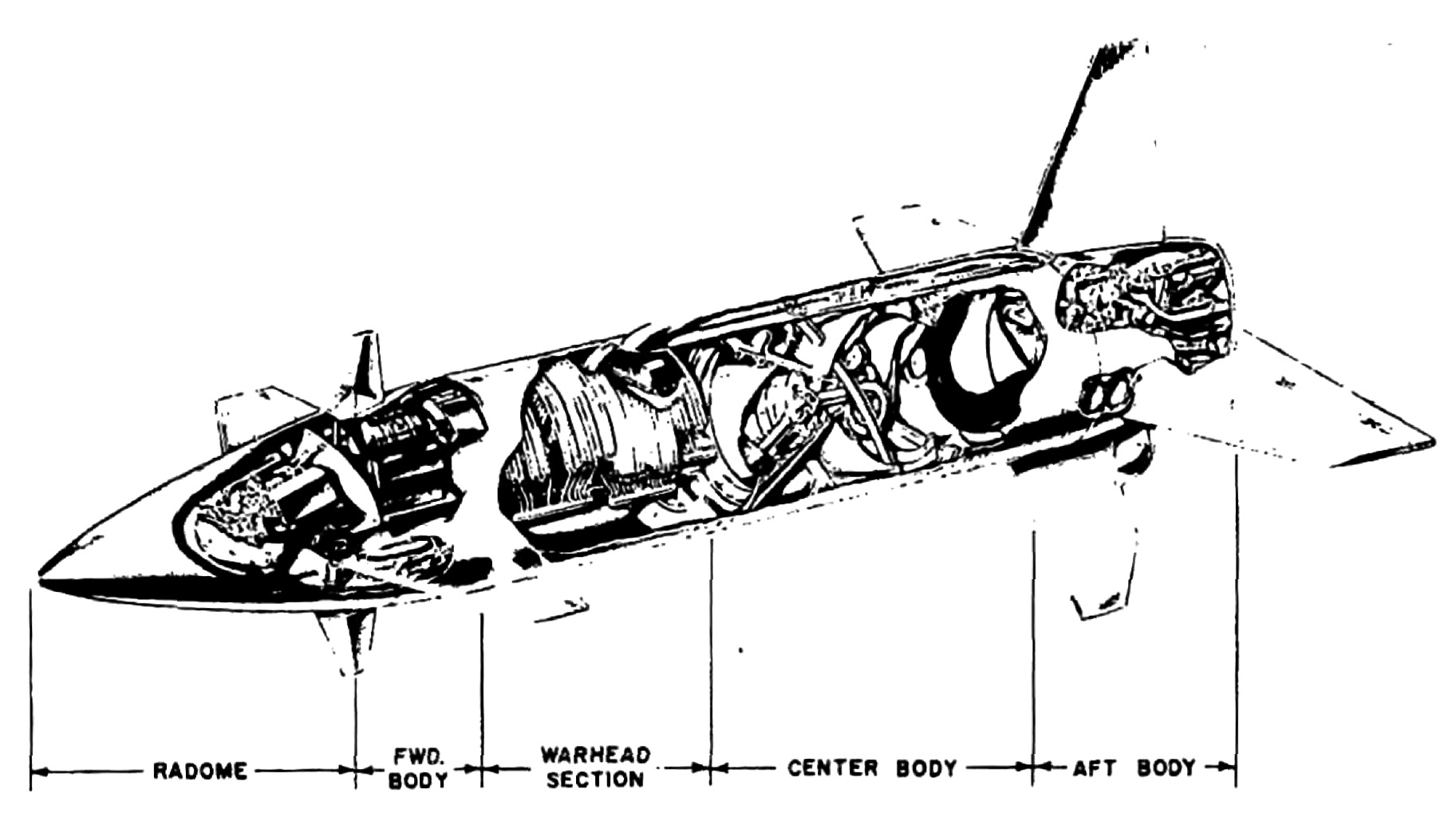
A cut-away view of the GAM-63 Rascal missile as of September 1956.

The RASCAL's forward section was interchangeable for different targets. Using this capability the RASCAL could be equipped with nuclear, biological, chemical, blast, or incendiary warheads. The requirements for biological and chemical warheads were dropped at the end of 1953. On 5 December 1949, requirements for the RASCAL called for a nuclear warhead weighing between 3,000 pounds (1,400 kg) and 5,000 pounds (2,300 kg). The RASCAL warhead compartment accommodated a cylinder 3.8 feet (1.2 m) in diameter and 6.25 feet (1.91 m) in length. The USAF also wanted the ability to use the RASCAL as a standard gravity bomb if the missile could not be readied for launch.

In January 1950, Bell began to study what nuclear warheads were available for RASCAL. The W-5 nuclear warhead was initially considered. On 20 August 1950 the Special Weapons Development Board (SWDB) authorized a W-5/RASCAL integration effort. The Atomic Energy Commission (AEC) was responsible for developing the fuzing system for the RASCAL warhead. No provision was made for surface burst at this time. In April 1952 fuze development was shifted to Bell which resulted because it was USAF policy to make airframe contractors responsible for nuclear weapons fuzing since this system needed to be integrated with the missile's guidance system. Bell developed two complete fuzing systems, airburst or surface burst. Then in March 1956 the W-5/RASCAL program was canceled.

In July 1955, the W-27 nuclear warhead was considered as a replacement for the W-5 for the RASCAL. USAF requirements for the W-27 called for a 2,800 lb (1,300 kg) nuclear warhead with either electronic countermeasures equipment, infrared countermeasures equipment, or extra fuel to increase the range of the RASCAL. A design for the adaption kit between the W-27 and the RASCAL was completed in January 1957 before the RASCAL was canceled.

Three bombers were originally considered as RASCAL launch platforms. The B-29 was removed from front line service while the RASCAL was in development. In March 1952, the USAF then turned to the B-36 and B-47 as RASCAL missile carriers. The B-36 was assigned first priority for the RASCAL. The USAF Strategic Air Command did not agree with the decision to use the B-47 to carry the RASCAL. SAC wished to substitute the B-47 with the B-50 proposing to field a single squadron each of RASCAL equipped B-50s and B-36s. It was determined that RASCAL-carrying B-50s would need to be based outside the United States because the B-50 would have less range while carrying the RASCAL. The decision to eliminate the B-50 as a RASCAL carrier was not reached until June 1956. A single B-50 was used as a launch platform in support of the RASCAL test program until 1955. A cradle lowered the RASCAL from the B-50's bomb bay before launch. The first powered RASCAL was launched from the test B-50 on 30 September 1952 at White Sands Missile Range, New Mexico in the United States

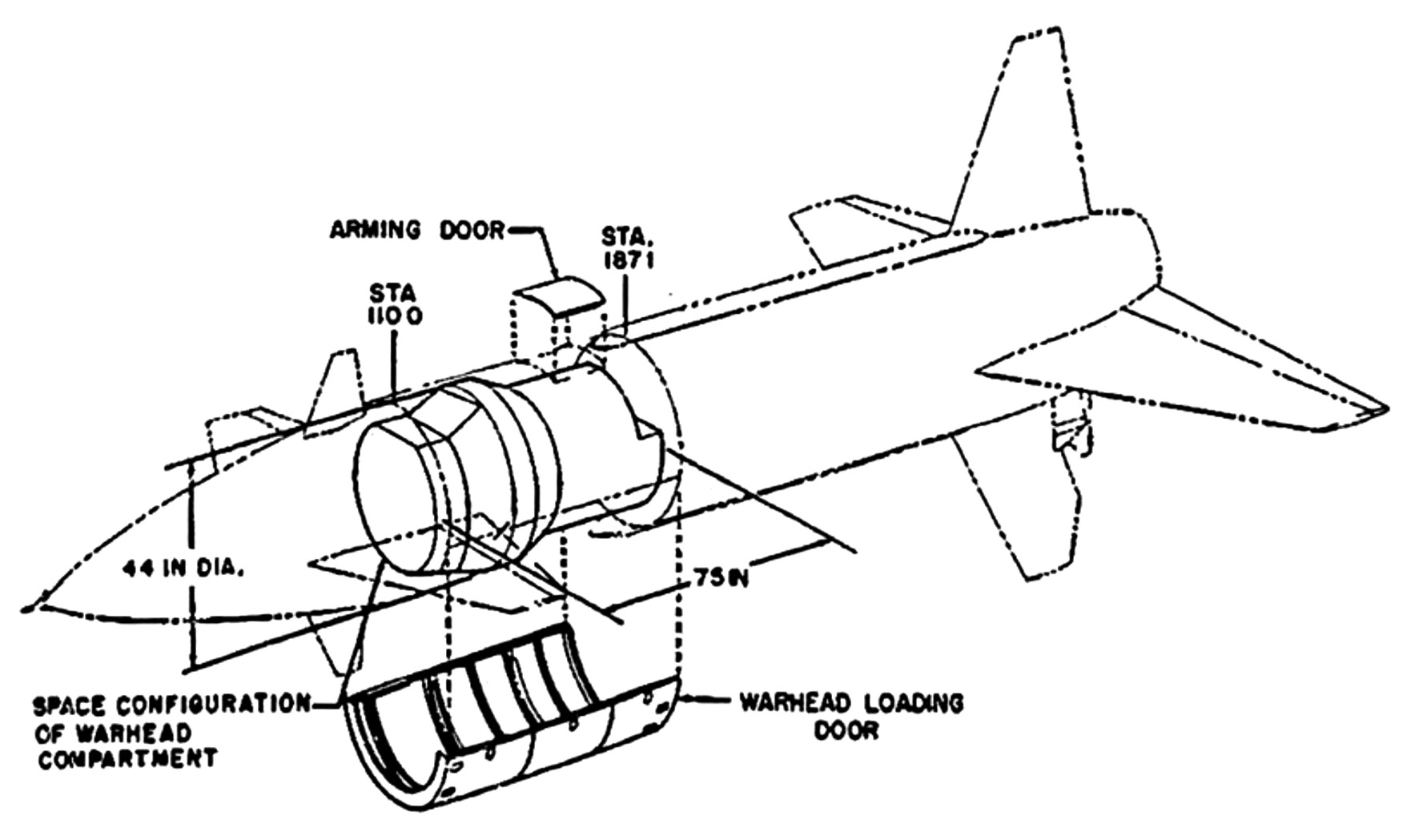
Configuration of GAM-63 Rascal Missile warhead compartment as of September 1956.

In May 1953, 12 DB-36H "director-bombers" were ordered from Convair. Each bomber would be equipped to carry a single RASCAL missile. The RASCAL occupied both of the B-36's aft bomb bays where it was carried semi-submerged. A portion of the missile was located inside the aircraft and a portion of the missile hung below the aircraft. One forward bomb bay was used to hold equipment required by the RASCAL's guidance system. The retractable antenna for the command guidance system was installed in the rear of the aircraft.

The first YDB-36H was flown on 3 July 1953. Six captive carry flights were flown between 31 July 1953 and 16 August 1953. The addition of the missile to the B-36 did not increase drag or change the handling characteristics of the bomber. An un-powered RASCAL was dropped from a YDB-36H on 25 August 1953. On 21 December 1954, a DB-36H was delivered to the Air Force for use in the RASCAL test program at Holloman Air Force Base, New Mexico, in the United States. By June 1955, at least two missiles had been launched from the B-36 and Convair had completed manufacturing modification kits for the 12 planned aircraft. Two kits had been installed on B-36 aircraft when the USAF decided to carry the RASCAL only on the B-47 bomber.

Before the end of 1952, Boeing received a contract from the USAF to modify two B-47Bs into prototype RASCAL missile carriers. A removable missile support strut was installed on the right side of the B-47. Extra internal structure was installed to support the loads of the strut and missile. While carrying the RASCAL, the B-47 could not carry other weapons. The guidance equipment for RASCAL was added to the B-47 bomb bay. The retractable antenna needed by RASCAL was added to the rear fuselage. Both aircraft were sent to Holloman Air Force Base to support the RASCAL test program. After completion of the two DB-47B prototypes, the delays in the RASCAL's development effectively placed the DB-47 modification effort on hold until March 1955. Then in June 1955, Boeing received a contract to modify 30 DB-47Bs to carry the RASCAL.

The Strategic Air Command was concerned that externally mounting the RASCAL and the associated internal equipment needed to support the missile would seriously degrade the performance of the bomber. The performance impact was great enough to make the B-47/RASCAL combination of questionable value. SAC also argued the B-47/RASCAL combination might never work well. Since the equipment being added to the B-47 to guide the missile added more complexity to the already complex B-47. Then the modification costs required to carry the RASCAL added nearly US$1 million to the cost of every B-47. To SAC these costs seemed premature considering the state of the RASCAL's development at that time. Finally SAC considered it unwise to commit aircraft and to start training crews before the missile's development had been completed.

The Strategic Air Command considered the GAM-63 of no value, but Air Staff wished to press on with deployment of the RASCAL. SAC actively prevented the B-52 from being used as a RASCAL carrier. The USAF then decided to use the B-47E as a RASCAL missile carrier. Boeing was contracted to convert two B-47E into YDB-47E aircraft. The first YDB-47E flew in January 1954. The first successful RASCAL launch from a DB-47E occurred in July 1955. The mission of bombers had changed in 1956 from high altitude penetration to low level penetration so as to evade enemy radars. The fact that the minimum launch altitude of the RASCAL was 35,000 feet (11,000 m) meant that a low altitude delivery was impossible

RASCAL test launches at White Sands Missile Range

1951	1954	1955	1956	1957	1958
2	1	14	8	21	1

== Limited Capabilities of the Rascal Weapon System ==
The actual mission profile of the Rascal was quite restrained. The mission began the moment the carrier aircraft left the ramp and took off towards a predetermined launch point and assigned target. Guidance before launch was dependent upon the DB-47E's MA-8 navigation system which determined the course to a preplanned launch point and automatically launched the missile when the launch point was reached. The flight of the Rascal began with a 19 degree climb angle to an altitude of 65,000 feet where it then leveled off. For the first 73 Nautical miles (roughly 195 seconds) Rascal was inertially guided. When the guidance system determined the missile was 17 nautical miles from the target the autopilot put the missile into a 35-degree dive. Then the terminal radar guidance switched on. The operator of the guidance system then had to interpret what vision the radar screen was providing him and decide to either monitor or correct the missiles course. SAC was not interested in the Rascal because of this operational restriction as well as significantly affecting the cost and usefulness of the launch airplane.

== Operational history ==
In early 1956, the USAF limited DB-47E production to just two aircraft. In May 1957 the USAF decided to field only one instead of two DB-47 squadrons equipped with the RASCAL missile. Strategic Air Command leadership believed the RASCAL was already obsolete. By December 1957, the USAF 445th Bomb Squadron of the USAF 321st Bomb Wing was training with the RASCAL. The first production RASCAL was accepted at Pinecastle Air Force Base on 30 October 1957. Funding shortages would prevent facilities from being built at Pinecastle Air Force Base until 1959. In August 1958 a review of the previous 6 months RASCAL testing revealed that out of 65 scheduled test launches only one launch was a success. More than half of the test launches were canceled and most of the others were failures.

On 29 September 1958 the USAF terminated the RASCAL program.

The AGM-28 Hound Dog replaced the GAM-63 program. The first flight tests of the Hound Dog were in April 1959, and the first operational Hound Dog was delivered to the USAF in December 1959. The first Hound Dog equipped SAC squadron reached initial operational capability in July 1960. The Hound Dog offered a weapon with nearly five times the range of the RASCAL, without command guidance, and without hazardous fuels to contend with. Two Hound Dogs could be carried by a B-52 as well as its normal bomb load.

== Variants ==
- ASM-A-2 - RASCAL designation under the USAF 1947 to 1951 designation system.
- B-63 - RASCAL designation under the USAF 1951 to 1955 designation system.
- XGAM-63 - 75 Prototype RASCALs (Serial Numbers 53-8195 through 53–8269)
- GAM-63A - 58 Production RASCALs (Serial Numbers 56-4469 through 56–4506)

== Operator ==
- United States
  - United States Air Force

== Survivors ==
- GAM-63 - American Legion Post 170, Midwest City, Oklahoma, United States.(registration required)
- GAM-63 - Air Force Space & Missile Museum, Cape Canaveral Space Force Station, Florida, United States. This pristine artifact is on display in Hangar C on Cape Canaveral SFS and can be viewed by the general public by taking the "Rise to Space" tour offered through the Kennedy Space Center Visitor Complex.
- GAM-63 - Castle Air Museum at the former Castle AFB, Atwater, California, United States.
- XGAM-63 - National Museum of the United States Air Force, Wright-Patterson Air Force Base, Dayton, Ohio, United States.
- GAM-63 - On static display near the southwest corner of the Goddard Junior High athletic field in Midland, Texas.

== See also ==
Aircraft of comparable role, configuration, and era

- Blue Steel (missile)
- AGM-28 Hound Dog
- AGM-69 SRAM

Related lists

- List of military aircraft of the United States
- List of missiles
