= 3200th Proof Test Group =

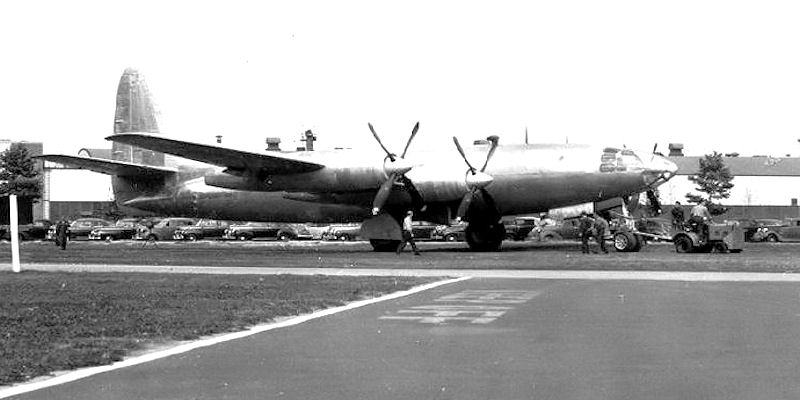
- Republic XR-12 Rainbow 44-91002 being tested by the 3200th Proof Test Group
- Active: 1948-1953
- Country: United States
- Branch: United States Air Force
- Role: Testing

The 3200th Proof Test Group is an inactive United States Air Force unit. It was last active with the Air Armament Center, based at Eglin AFB, Florida. It was inactivated on 1 July 1953.

== History ==
Established by the Air Armament Center at Eglin AFB in 1948, being formed from the 3200th Air Transport Test Squadron, and taking over the mission of the World War II 1st Proving Ground Group. During its existence, the units mission was heavily classified. Mission was service testing, training and demonstrations of weapons systems under development. Was equipped with B-50 Superfortress, F-80 Shooting Star, F-84 Thunderjet, F-86 Sabre, B-45 Tornado, Hughes XF-11, Republic XF-12 Rainbow, SA-16 Albatross, C-119 Flying Boxcar, Hughes XH-17 Helicopter and other systems. The group operated a climate-controlled hangar to test aircraft in arctic cold conditions to desert and subtropical humid heat.

In the spring of 1949 launched Republic-Ford JB-2 missiles from underneath the wings of B-36 Peacemaker aircraft. About a year later, JB-2s were tested as aerial targets for experimental infrared gunsights, being launched from Wagner Field (Formerly: Eglin Air Force Auxiliary Field #1) as part of project MX-544.

The fourth F-82B Twin Mustang (44-65163) was fitted with retractable pylons under the outer wings capable of mounting 10 High-Velocity Air Rockets (HVAR) each, which folded into the wing undersurface when not in use. This installation was not adopted on later models, the standard "tree" being used instead. The 13th aircraft (44-65171). was experimentally fitted with a center wing mounted pod housing an array of recon cameras, and was assigned to the 3200th Photo Measurement and Analysis Squadron, being designated, unofficially, the RF-82B (the aircraft designation changed to F-82 in 1948).

An F-84 Thunderjet was modified by the 3200th Fighter Test Squadron to carry 32 six-inch HVARs and was used for ground attack tests on concrete structures, armored vehicles and bridges.

Other testing included operational suitability of TM-61 Madador guided missile for tactical operations, testing of YH-12 helicopter to develop tactics and techniques to be used in assault helicopter operations, and tests involving operational suitability of B-47 Stratojets. Participated in the National Air Race at Detroit, Michigan in 1951, winning the Bendix Trophy flying an F-86 Sabre.

Inactivated in July 1953, mission, personnel and equipment reassigned to new 3206th Test Group.

=== Lineage ===
- Established as 3200th Proof Test Group and activated, 1 July 1948

Inactivated on 1 July 1953.

=== Assignments ===
- Air Armament Center, 1 July 1948
- 550th Guided Missiles Wing, 26 April-11 December 1950
- 3200th Proof Test Wing, 1 April 1951
- Air Armament Center, 1 July 1952 – 1 July 1953

=== Components ===
- 3200th Air Transport Test Squadron, 16 January 1948

Re-designated 3201st Base Flight Squadron, 1–9 July 1948

- 3200th Fighter Test Squadron, 1 July 1948 – 1 July 1953
- 3200th Light Bomber Test Squadron, 1 July 1948 – 1 July 1953
- 3200th Medium and Heavy Bomber Test Squadron, 1 July 1948 – 1 July 1953
- 3200th Photo Measurement and Analysis Squadron, 1 July 1948 – 1 April 1951
- 3200th Photo Test Squadron, 1 April 1951 – 1 July 1953
- 3200th Electronics Test Squadron, 1 September 1949 – 1 July 1953
- 3200th Drone Squadron, 26 April 1950 – 1 July 1950; 1 December 1950 – 1 June 1951
- 3200th Air Base Squadron, 12 July 1951 – 1 July 1953
- 3200th Armament Test Squadron, 1 April 1951 – 1 July 1953
- 3200th Measurement and Data Reduction Squadron, 1 April 1951 – 1 July 1953

=== Stations ===
- Eglin AFB, Florida, 1 July 1948 – 1 July 1953
