= Air Armament Center =

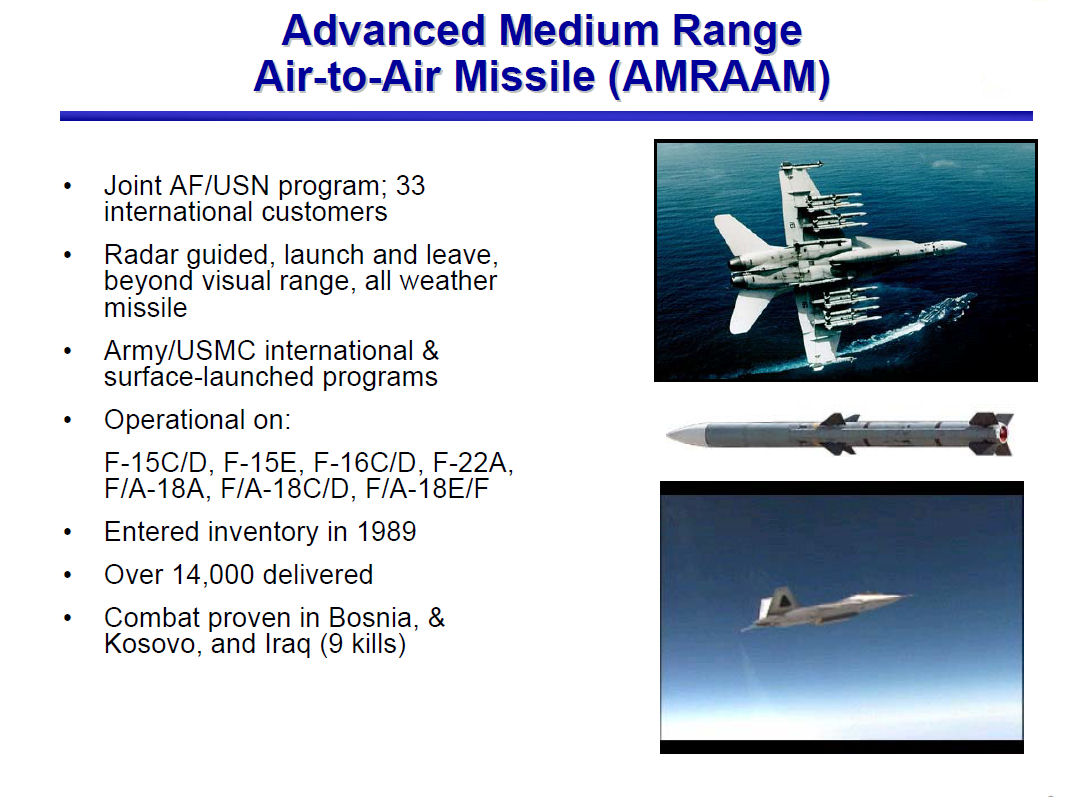
- AIM-120 AMRAAM air-air missile developed at the Air Armament Center
- Active: 16 October 1943 – 18 July 2012
- Country: United States
- Branch: United States Air Force
- Role: Weapons sustainment

Commanders
- Notable commanders: Major General Kenneth D. Merchant (final commander)

Insignia
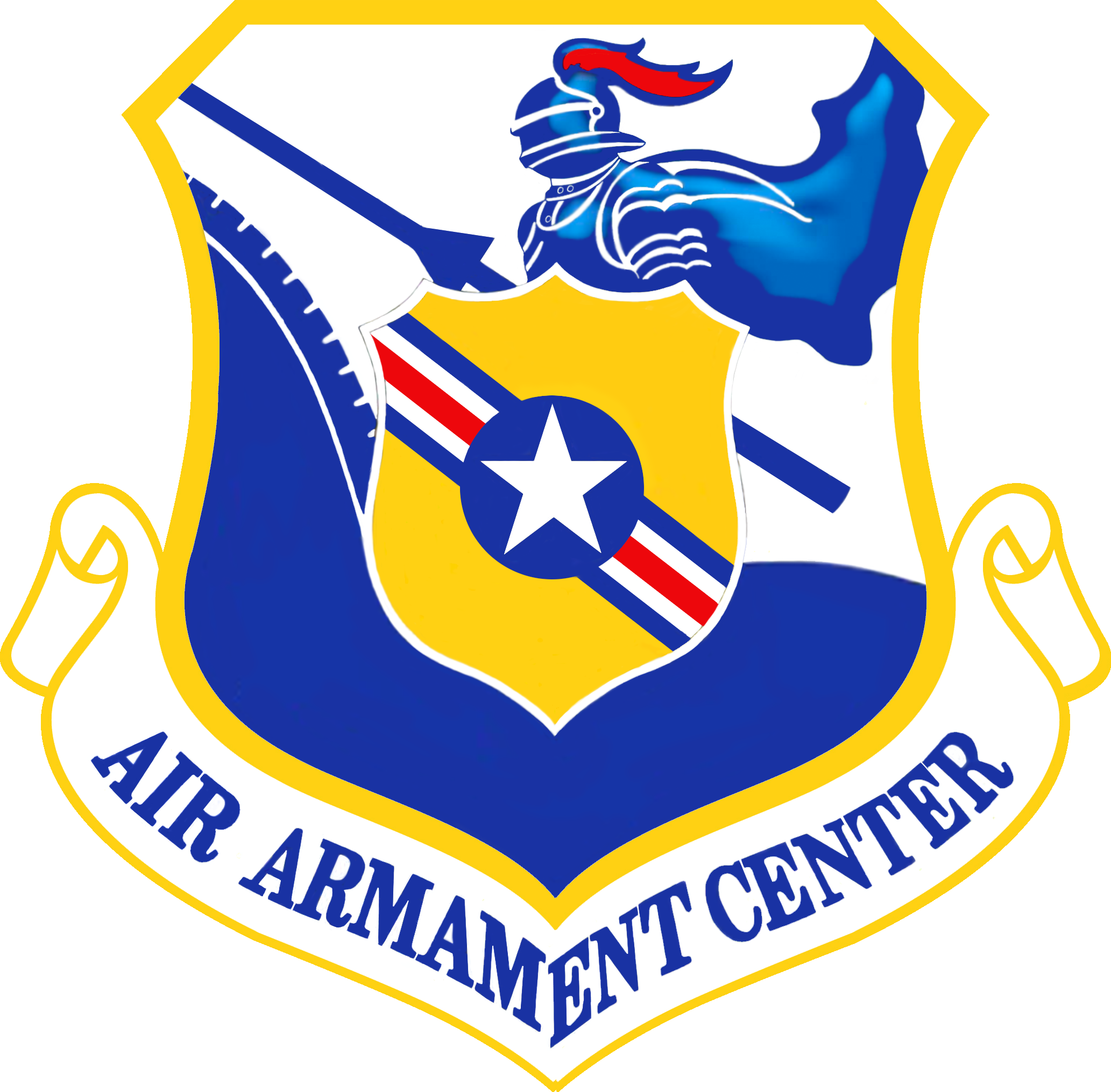
- Air Armament Center emblem

The Air Armament Center was an Air Force Materiel Command center at Eglin Air Force Base, Florida, responsible for development, acquisition, testing, and deployment of all air-delivered weapons for the U.S. Air Force. Weapon systems maintained by the center included the Advanced Medium Range Air-to-Air Missile, High-speed anti-radiation missile, HARM Targeting System, Joint Air-to-Surface Standoff Missile, Joint Direct Attack Munition, Miniature Air-Launched Decoy, Sensor Fuzed Weapon, and the Small Diameter Bomb. The Air Armament Center was inactivated on 18 July 2012, and its functions merged into the former 96th Air Base Wing at Eglin AFB. The 96th was renamed as the 96th Test Wing the same day as a subordinate command of the Air Force Test Center at Edwards Air Force Base, California.

== History ==
On 15 May 1941, the Air Corps Specialized Flying School at Eglin Field was replaced by the Air Corps Proving Ground. It was redesignated Proving Ground Command on 1 April 1942, and disbanded on 1 June 1945. In 1946, the Army Air Forces Center moved to Eglin, where it took its place, becoming the Army Air Forces Proving Ground Command.

On 27 October 1942 the United States Army Air Forces established the Army Air Forces School of Applied Tactics at Orlando Army Air Base, Florida. The next year, it was redesignated as the Army Air Forces Tactical Center, on 16 October 1943. On 1 June 1945, it was redesignated the Army Air Forces Center and added the testing functions of the AAF Proving Ground Command as it took control of Eglin.

The Air Force Center was the planned USAF unit for the development of tactical policy and procedures. The Air Force Center was to be the succeeding unit to the Army Air Forces Center. Instead, the center became the Army Air Forces Proving Ground Command on 8 March 1946 and moved to Eglin. The command was redesignated the Air Proving Ground Command on 10 July 1946.

=== Testing of weapons ===
The command conducted realistic testing of new weapons as an independent organization, reporting directly to the Chief of Staff of the Air Force and advocating a "fly-before-buy" approach to acquiring new systems. Such a shift, however, remained a challenge, for the Air Force continued the "buy-fly-fix" process that had grown from the demands of the Second World War and undervalued the importance of timely independent operational test and evaluation.

It attempted to simulate combat conditions during its tests. It also grew in size as it acquired the systems it tested. By 1956, Air Force regulations outlined an eight-phase test and evaluation process that did not include the comand until phase seven. By that point in the acquisition cycle, the Air Force had often already fielded units with new systems that APGC had not yet tested. Not surprisingly, operators often experienced serious problems with these new, untested systems. This led to a misperception about the value of operational test and evaluation (OT&E) and the command. Had OT&E taken place before production decisions and fielding new systems, there likely would not have been any question about the added value of independent OT&E.

As a result of the doubts about the value of the command and cuts to the defense budget, in 1957 the Air Force stripped it of its major command status, reduced its budget and authorized personnel, and redesignated the Command the Air Proving Ground Center, and assigned it to the Air Research and Development Command. This action meant the Air Force no longer had an independent organization that specialized in impartial operational test and evaluation.

Decentralized operational testing at the major commands occurred from 1958 to 1973. Major command emphasis was often on quick deployment rather than thorough testing and impartial evaluations. Although the Air Force streamlined OT&E from eight to three phases during this period, OT&E still came at the end of the acquisition process. In addition, as systems became more complex, and the Air Force moved to acquire systems quickly, the "fly-before-buy" approach fell by the wayside. The consequences became clear when a Department of Defense study found that 21 of 22 major weapons systems used in the Vietnam War from 1965 to 1970 suffered severe operational deficiencies. These results strongly stated the case for independent OT&E in the Air Force.

The Air Armament Center was a focal point for the acquisition of advanced weapons systems. The center carried out scientific research, system management, production, operational performance, business management, requirements definition, customer and engineering support, technology planning, materiel identification, and field support activities.

While "fly-before-buy" has repeatedly proven its worth in thorough testing of systems and avoidance of later problems, the Air Force even in the twenty-first century remains severely hampered by a "buy-fly-fix" approach. Literally billions of dollars have been spent in making weapons systems operational after they have entered squadron service. For example, the Rockwell B-1B Lancer suffered repeated such problems. When declared operational, apart from nuclear weapons, the only conventional weapon the B-1 could use were free-fall bombs.

=== Structure through 2010 ===
To accomplish its mission the Air Armament Center commanded three wings through 2010.

- The 46th Test Wing conducted test and evaluation of all air-delivered weapons, navigation and guidance systems, command and control systems, and Air Force Special Operations Command systems. The 46th Test Wing was inactivated 18 July 2012. Effectively merged to become 96th Test Wing.
- The 96th Air Base Wing provided installation support for all Eglin Air Force Base tenant units. The 96th Air Base Wing was redesignated 18 July 2012. Effectively merged to become 96th Test Wing.
- The 308th Armament Systems Wing was responsible for the development, procurement, deployment, and sustainment of air-based weaponry including the Joint Direct Attack Munition, Joint Air-to-Surface Standoff Missile, Small Diameter Bomb, Sensor Fuzed Weapon, Wind Corrected Munitions Dispenser, Advanced Medium Range Air-to-Air Missile, Miniature Air-Launched Decoy. The 308th Armament Systems Wing was inactivated in 2010 and became the Armament Systems Directorate.

== Lineage ==
- Established as the Army Air Forces School of Applied Tactics on 27 October 1942 (Note: The School had major command status.)

Redesignated Army Air Forces Tactical Center on 16 October 1943
Redesignated Army Air Forces Center on 1 June 1945
Redesignated Army Air Forces Proving Ground Command on 8 March 1946 (Note: Replaced another disbanded AAF Proving Ground Command, whose functions it had assumed in June 1945.)
Redesignated Air Proving Ground Command on 10 July 1946
Redesignated Air Proving Ground, 20 January 1948 (Note: It lost major command status until 1 June 1948, when it again became a majpt cpmmand.)
Redesignated Air Proving Ground Command on 29 December 1951
Redesignated Air Proving Ground Center on 1 December 1957 (Note: It again lost major command status.)
Redesignated Armament Development and Test Center on 1 August 1968
Redesignated Armament Division on 1 October 1979
Redesignated Munitions Systems Division on 15 March 1989
Redesignated Air Force Development Test Center on 11 July 1990
Redesignated: Air Armament Center on 1 October 1998
Inactivated on 1 October 2012

=== Assignments ===
- Army Air Forces, 27 October 1942
- Air Materiel Command, 20 January 1948
- United States Air Force, 1 June 1948
- Air Research and Development Command (later Air Force Systems Command), 1 December 1957
- Air Force Materiel Command, 1 July 1992 – 1 October 2012 (attached to Air Force Life Cycle Management Center after 18 July 2012)

=== Components ===
- 3200th Proof Test Group, 1948-1950s
- 3206th Proof Test Group

=== Stations ===
- Orlando Army Air Base, Florida, 27 October 1952
- Eglin Field (later Eglin Air Force Base), Florida, 8 March 1946 – 1 October 2012
