= Burya =

Soviet early-Cold War strategic cruise missile project

The Burya ("Storm" in Russian; Russian: Буря) was a supersonic, intercontinental cruise missile, developed by the Lavochkin design bureau (chief designer Naum Semyonovich Chernyakov) under designation La-350 (Ла-350) from 1954 until the program cancellation in February 1960. The request for proposal issued by the Soviet government in 1954, called for a cruise missile capable of delivering a nuclear payload to the United States. Analogous developments in the United States were the SM-62 Snark and SM-64 Navaho cruise missiles, particularly the latter, which used parallel technology and had similar performance goals.

== Development ==
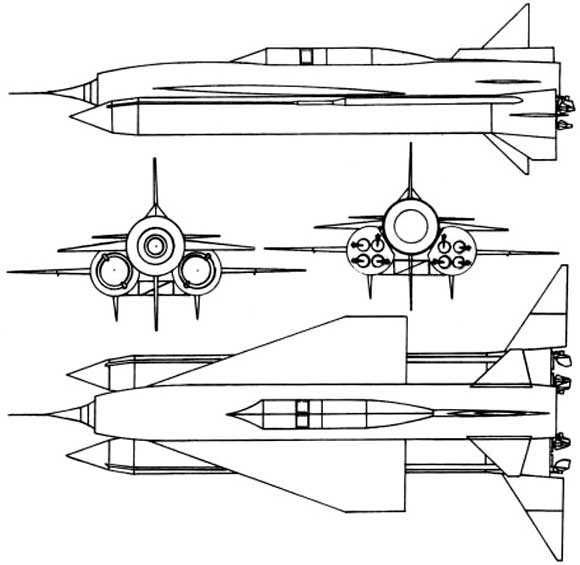
Lavochkin La-350 Burya

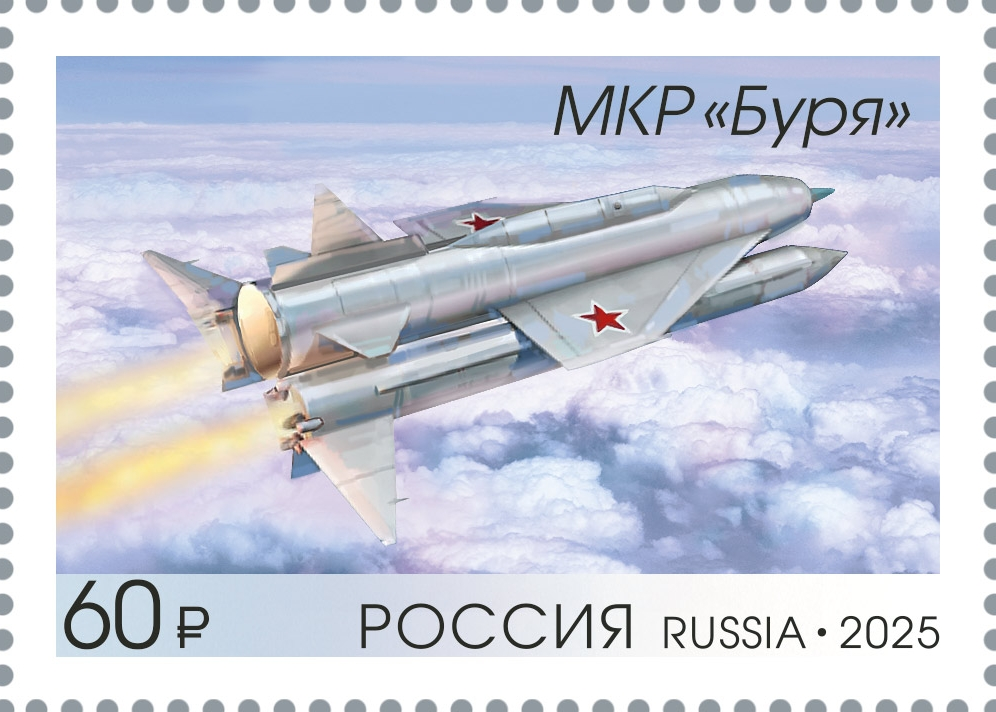
Postage stamp

The first steps towards development of Burya was the idea of Mstislav Vsevolodovich Keldysh of Keldysh bomber. The Burya was planned as a Mach 3 intercontinental nuclear ramjet cruise missile. The Burya was remarkably advanced for its time, and despite setbacks and several crashes, the vehicle demonstrated a range in excess of 6,000 km with a thermonuclear (hydrogen) bomb-sized payload at speeds greater than Mach 3. The Burya had a two-stage design - the daring concept for an intercontinental missile was the second stage, which was powered by a ramjet engine at its operational speed of Mach 3. This varied from the original Trommsdorff concept of World War II in that no mother aircraft launch preceded the rocket boosted phase. The first stage was a booster rocket derived from a ballistic missile, which accelerated the Burya to altitude and the speed necessary to ignite its ramjet engine. To use a hybrid jet-ramjet to broaden its operating speed would have been more complex.

Successful tests were achieved after official cancellation of the project, when it continued as a technology demonstration. It was a casualty, like the USAF Navaho, of the greater simplicity and relative invulnerability to interception of intercontinental ballistic missiles. The Burya was an early precursor to the Zvezda and M-40 Buran projects.

The guidance system was realized using an inertial system and also a star tracking system. The star tracking system located its position relative to the brightest stars through windows located on the top of stage 2. The star tracking system was more accurate for a long range flight compared to the inertial systems available at that time, even if more complex.

== Specifications ==
=== General characteristics ===
- Function: Nuclear cruise missile
- Launch mass: 96,000 kg
- Total length: 19.9 m
- Launch platform: Launch pad
- First flight test: 1 July 1957
- Last flight test: 16 December 1960
- Number of successful launches: 14
- Number of failed launches: 3
- Status: Canceled

=== Launch vehicle (stage 1) ===
- Function: Multi-purpose launch vehicle
- Engine: 2× Burya booster with S2.1150 engine
- Length: 18.9 m
- Diameter: 1.45 m
- Thrust: 68.61 t
- Oxidizer: Nitric acid
- Combustible: Amine

=== Cruise missile (stage 2) ===
- Engine: 1× RD-012U ramjet
- Cruise Speed : Mach 3.1-3.3
- Maximal speed in test: Mach 3.4-3.5 (3 700 km/h)
- Range: 8000 - 8,500 km
- Maximal range in test: 6,500 km
- Flight altitude: 18–25,5 km
- Warhead: thermonuclear, 2190 kg
- Length: 18.0 m
- Diameter: 2.20 m
- Wing span: 7.75 m
- Wing area: 60 m^{2}
