= Proton-PM =

Subsidiary of Roscosmos

- Native name: Протон-ПМ
- Romanized name: Proton-PM
- Formerly: I.V. Stalin Plant No. 19
- Company type: Open joint-stock company
- Industry: Liquid rocket engine manufacturing; Aircraft engine manufacturing; Turbopumps manufacturing; Gas turbine power station production; Metallurgical production
- Founded: Perm, Russia (March 12, 1958)
- Headquarters: 93, avenue Komsomolsky, Perm, 614990, Perm, Russia
- Key people: Igor Arbuzov
- Products: RD-214; RD-253 RD-275 RD-276 RD-191
- Parent: Roscosmos
- Website: Official Website

OJSC Proton-PM (Russian: АО «Протон-ПМ») is a Russian engine and heavy machinery manufacturing plant. It is located in the city of Perm, in the Perm Krai, on the bank of the Kama River. It started in 1958 as the specialized branch of Plant No. 19 named after I. V. Stalin for the manufacturing of the RD-214 rocket engine. In 1964 it was given made a separate entity then known as Second Production. In the later years, it has branched intro producing gas turbine power plants.

== Products ==
=== Current engines ===
Engines in current production at the plant:

- RD-276 the latest version of the RD-275.
- RD-191 a liquid rocket engine, burning kerosene and LOX that powers the Angara (rocket) family of launch vehicles.

=== Former engines ===
Engines that are no longer produced at the plant.

- RD-214 a liquid rocket engine, burning AK-27I (a mixture of 73% Nitric acid + 27% N_{2}O_{4} + iodine passivant and TM-185 (a kerosene and gasoline mix), that powered the R-12 and Kosmos-2.
- RD-253 a liquid rocket engine, burning UDMH/N_{2}O_{4} that powers the Proton first stage.
- RD-275 an improved RD-253.

=== Gas Turbines ===
- Ural-2500 gas-turbine power station (2.55 MW/ 5.82 Gcal per hour),
- Ural-4000 gas-turbine power station (4.13 MW/ 8.3 Gcal per hour),
- Ural-6000 gas-turbine power station (6.14 MW/ 11.44 Gcal per hour),
- GTES-16PA gas-turbine power station (16.3 MW/ 19.48 Gcal per hour),
- GTES-25P gas-turbine power station (23.0 MW/ 26.1 Gcal per hour).
- GTU-32P (up to 34 40 MW)

== See also ==
- NPO Energomash — The rocket engine designer that delegates some serial production to this plant.
- Khrunichev State Research and Production Space Center — The Proton-M and Angara (rocket) manufacturer that delegate engine production to this plant.
- Aviadvigatel — The corporate parent.
