= SSM-A-5 Boojum =

Canceled cruise missile project

XSSM-A-5 Boojum
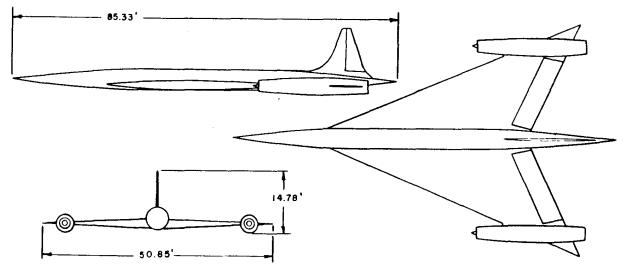
- The final design of the XSSM-A-5
- Type: Cruise missile
- Place of origin: United States

Service history
- Used by: United States Air Force

Production history
- Designed: 1946–1951
- Manufacturer: Northrop Corporation
- No. built: 0

Specifications
- Mass: 112,000 pounds (51,000 kg)
- Length: 85 feet 4 inches (26.01 m)
- Height: 14 feet 9 inches (4.50 m)
- Wingspan: 50 feet 10 inches (15.49 m)
- Warhead: Nuclear
- Engine: Two J47 turbojets
- Operational range: 3,153 mi (5,075 km)
- Flight ceiling: 70,000 feet (21,000 m)
- Maximum speed: Mach 2
- Guidance system: Celestial navigation

The XSSM-A-5 Boojum, also known by the project number MX-775B, was a supersonic cruise missile developed by the Northrop Corporation for the United States Air Force in the late 1940s. Intended to deliver a nuclear warhead over intercontinental range, the project was determined to be too ambitious given technical difficulties with the SM-62 Snark which it was planned to follow, and it was canceled in 1951.

== Development ==
As part of a United States Army Air Forces effort to develop guided missiles for the delivery of nuclear weapons, the Northrop Corporation was awarded a development contract in March 1946 for the design of two long-range cruise missiles designated MX-775. The contract called for a subsonic missile MX-775A, later designated SSM-A-3 Snark, and a more advanced supersonic missile MX-775B, which in 1947 was given the name SSM-A-5 Boojum. Northrop named the missiles after characters from the works of Lewis Carroll, with Boojum coming from the final line of The Hunting of the Snark.

Designated N-25B by the company, the final design called for a long, slender missile, fitted with delta wings, and powered by a pair of General Electric turbojet engines, mounted in nacelles near the tips of the wing. (Note: A similar configuration would later be used by the Lockheed SR-71 Blackbird reconnaissance aircraft.)

The missile was intended to be launched using a rocket sled; air-launch from a Convair B-36 heavy bomber was an alternative that was studied. The missile would climb at subsonic speed to its operating altitude, then conduct a supersonic dash to the target area, guided by a celestial navigation system. A "slipper" type drop tank would be jettisoned halfway through the flight. The Boojum was intended carry a warhead weighing up to 5,000 pounds (2,300 kg) over a range between 1,500 to 5,000 miles (2,400 to 8,000 km).

== Cancellation ==
At the end of 1946, the contracts that had been awarded to Northrop were revised; the Snark was canceled, while the Boojum was to be fully developed as an operational system. Northrop lobbied for the reinstatement of the Snark, however; this was successful in getting the program reauthorized during 1947, with the Boojum being deferred to a follow-on project.

Despite the design having been finalized, the United States Air Force (which the USAAF had become in 1948) determined that the project was technologically unfeasible, given continuing development difficulties and technical problems encountered during the Snark's development. Accordingly, in 1951, the Boojum project was canceled, before any prototypes of the missile had been constructed.

== See also ==
- EKR (missile)
- SM-64 Navajo
- SSM-N-9 Regulus II
