= RD-214 =

Rocket engine

RD-214 (РД-214)
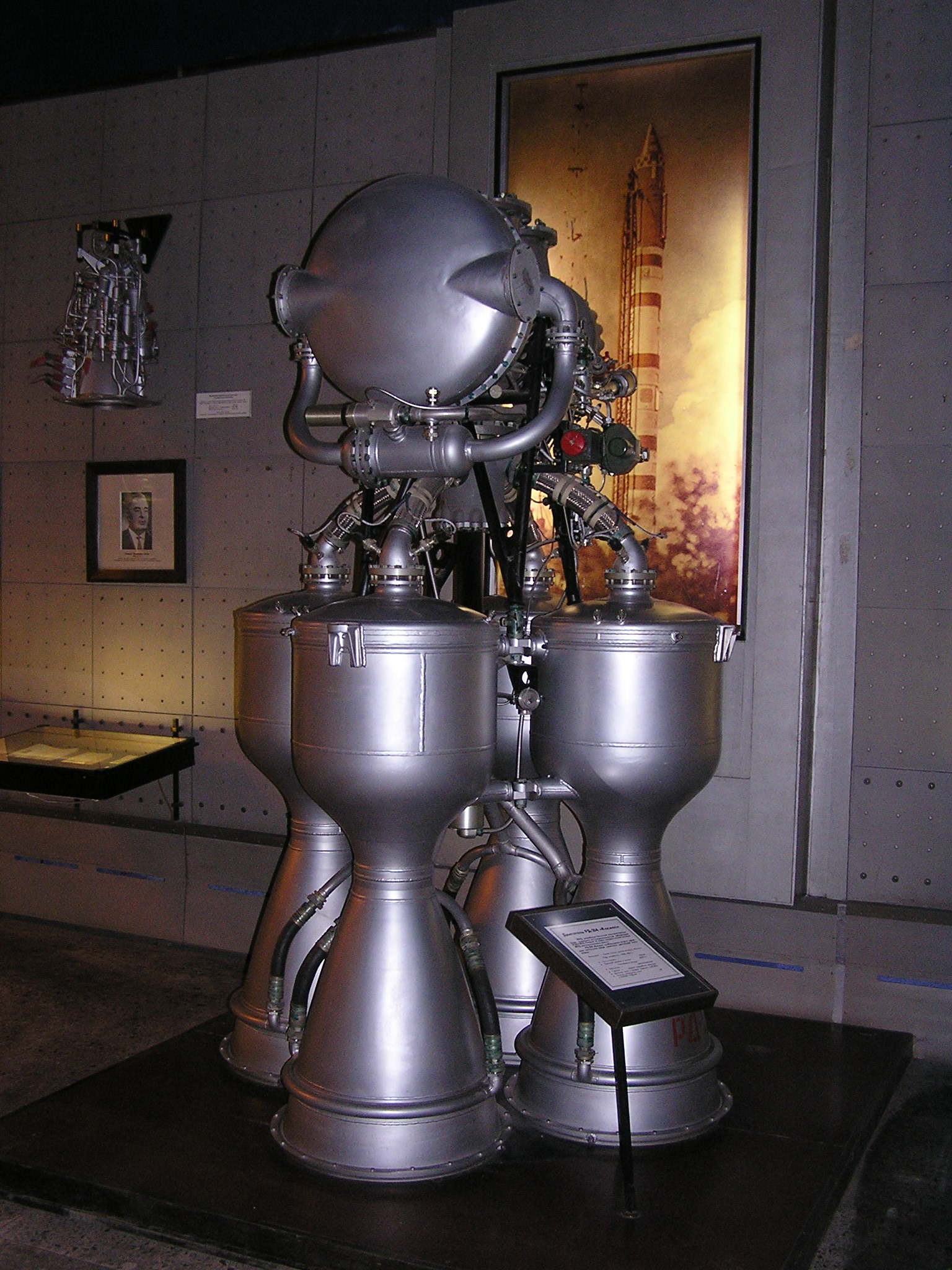
- Museum of Space and Missile Technology (Saint Petersburg). RD-214 for Kosmos LV first stage.
- Country of origin: Soviet Union
- Date: 1955-1959
- Designer: Energomash, V.Glushko
- Manufacturer: Plant No. 19 named after I. V. Stalin
- Associated LV: R-12 and Kosmos-2
- Status: Retired

Liquid-fuel engine
- Propellant: AK-27I / TM-185
- Mixture ratio: 3.97
- Cycle: Gas Generator

Configuration
- Chamber: 4
- Nozzle ratio: 9.42

Performance
- Thrust, vacuum: 730.2 kilonewtons (164,200 lbf)
- Thrust, sea-level: 635.2 kilonewtons (142,800 lbf)
- Chamber pressure: 4.36 megapascals (632 psi)
- Specific impulse, vacuum: 264 s (2.59 km/s)
- Specific impulse, sea-level: 230 s (2.3 km/s)
- Burn time: 140 s

Dimensions
- Length: 2,380 millimetres (94 in)
- Diameter: 1,480 millimetres (58 in)
- Dry mass: 655 kilograms (1,444 lb)

Used in
- R-12 and Kosmos-2

The RD-214 (GRAU Index 8D59) was a liquid rocket engine, burning AK-27I (a mixture of 73% nitric acid and 27% N_{2}O_{4} + iodine passivant) and TM-185 (a kerosene and gasoline mix) in the gas generator cycle. As was the case with many V-2 influenced engines, the single turbine was driven by steam generated by catalytic decomposition of hydrogen peroxide. It also had four combustion chambers and vector control was achieved by refractory vanes protruding into the nozzle's exhaust.

== Development ==
For the requirements to have storable propellants and higher thrust, Glushko's OKB-456 developed the RD-211, which had four combustion chambers, each having twice the thrust of the RD-100, a Russian adaptation of the V-2 A-4 engine. The four chambers were fed from a single turbopump powered by steam generated from catalytic decomposition of hydrogen peroxide. When then came the requirement for the Buran cruise missile project, a version for that application was developed in the RD-212. Both RD-211 and RD-212 proved too weak for the application and the project were abandoned for the RD-213 for Buran. When Yangel's OKB-586 was tasked with developing the first storable propellant ballistic missile in the Soviet arsenal, the RD-211 proved too weak. Thus, the project was definitely abandoned and the more powerful RD-214 was developed. While Korolev's refusal to use toxic propellants basically left him out of the ballistic missile development race, the basic design of the RD-211 also served as basis for the RD-107/RD-108 engine, which went to be the most flown rocket engines in history.

The initial R-12 was a pad launched missile. It had significant operative issues on readiness and vulnerability. Thus, the silo launched R-12U was developed. For this development the RD-214U was developed. When Yangel used the R-12U as the basis for the Kosmos-2 63S1, the RD-214F was developed and fire tested, but in the end the stock R-12U was used as first stage. So it was for all subsequent 63S1M and 11K63.

== Versions ==
This engine many versions:

- RD-211: GRAU Index 8D57. Original design for the R-12. Based on the RD-100, itself an adaptation of the V-2 A4 engine. This engine already had four separate combustion chambers, an H_{2}O_{2} steam driven turbine and required vanes in the exhaust to control the rocket.
- RD-212: GRAU Index 8D41. Originally developed from the RD-211 for the Buran cruise missile project. Project drop in favor of RD-213 due to insufficient thrust.
- RD-213: GRAU Index 8D13. Similar to the RD-214. Developed for the Buran cruise missile project. Cancelled with the project.
- RD-214: GRAU Index 8D59. Original version of the engine designed for the R-12 (8K63).
- RD-214U: GRAU Index 8D59. Improved version of the engine. Flew on the R-12U (8K63S) and Kosmos-2 (11K63) launch vehicle.
- RD-214F: GRAU Index 11D45. Project for the initial version of Kosmos-2 (63S1).

RD-214 Family of Engines
Engine	RD-211	RD-212	RD-213	RD-214	RD-214U	RD-214F
AKA	8D57	8D41	8D13	8D59	8D59U	11D45
Development	1953-1955	1954-1956	1956-1957	1955-1959	1959-1960	1960-1962
Engine type	Gas generator					
Propellant	AK-27I (73% nitric acid, 27% N_{2}O_{4}, and iodine passivant) / TM-185 (a kerosene and gasoline mix)					
Combustion chamber pressure	3.923 megapascals (569.0 psi)	3.923 megapascals (569.0 psi)	4.66 megapascals (676 psi)	4.36 megapascals (632 psi)	4.36 megapascals (632 psi)	4.38 megapascals (635 psi)
Thrust, vacuum	642.3 kilonewtons (144,400 lbf)	622.7 kilonewtons (140,000 lbf)	749.2 kilonewtons (168,400 lbf)	730.2 kilonewtons (164,200 lbf)	730.6 kilonewtons (164,200 lbf)	729.6 kilonewtons (164,000 lbf)
Thrust, sea level	549.2 kilonewtons (123,500 lbf)	559 kilonewtons (126,000 lbf)	686.5 kilonewtons (154,300 lbf)	635.2 kilonewtons (142,800 lbf)	635.5 kilonewtons (142,900 lbf)	635.5 kilonewtons (142,900 lbf)
I_{sp}, vacuum	253 s (2.48 km/s)	254 s (2.49 km/s)	264 s (2.59 km/s)	264 s (2.59 km/s)	264 s (2.59 km/s)	264 s (2.59 km/s)
I_{sp}, sea level	224 s (2.20 km/s)	227 s (2.23 km/s)	231 s (2.27 km/s)	230 s (2.3 km/s)	230 s (2.3 km/s)	230 s (2.3 km/s)
Burn time	122s	100s	110s		140s	
Length	2,700 millimetres (110 in)	2,500 millimetres (98 in)	2,500 millimetres (98 in)	2,380 millimetres (94 in)	2,380 millimetres (94 in)	2,380 millimetres (94 in)
Diameter	1,650 millimetres (65 in)	1,480 millimetres (58 in)	1,480 millimetres (58 in)	1,500 millimetres (59 in)	1,480 millimetres (58 in)	1,480 millimetres (58 in)
Dry weight	635 kilograms (1,400 lb)	642 kilograms (1,415 lb)	625 kilograms (1,378 lb)	655 kilograms (1,444 lb)	655 kilograms (1,444 lb)	655 kilograms (1,444 lb)
Use	R-12 (8K63) Project	Buran Project	Buran Project	R-12 (8K63)	R-12U (8K63S); Kosmos-2 (11K63)	Project for Kosmos-2 (63S1)

== See also ==
- R-12 Dvina - Ballistic missile for which this engine was originally developed for.
- Kosmos-2 - launch vehicle that uses an R-12 as first stage.
- Rocket engine using liquid fuel
