= RSS-40 Buran =

Cancelled Soviet cruise missile

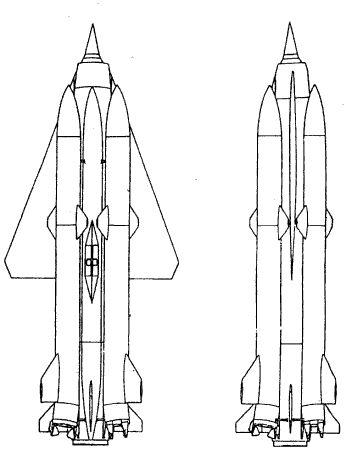
Myasishchev RSS-40 Buran

The Buran (Russian: Буран, named for the Buran wind) cruise missile, designation M-40 (М-40) sometimes referred to as RSS-40, was a Soviet intercontinental cruise missile by Myasishchev capable of carrying a 3,500 kg hydrogen bomb payload. The project was canceled before flight tests began. It is unrelated to the later Buran reusable orbiter.

== Development ==
The project was authorized on 20 May 1954, parallel to the development of the Burya missile. The development however, began in April 1953 as a rocket-aircraft system by Myasishchev OKB with internal designation M-40. The project was canceled in November 1957, when two prototypes were just ready for flight testing, in favor of the R-7 Semyorka, since ICBMs were considered unstoppable. Like the Burya, the Buran consisted of two stages, the booster rockets designated M-41, and the cruise missile stage designated M-42.

== Specifications ==
=== General characteristics ===
- Function: Nuclear cruise missile
- Launch mass: 125000 kg
- Total length: 24.0 m
- Launch platform: Launch pad
- Status: Canceled before first flight tests

=== Launch vehicle (M-41) ===
- Engine: 4× RD-213
- Thrust: 4× 55 t
- Length: 19.1 m
- Diameter: 1.20 m
- Oxidizer: Liquid oxygen
- Combustible: Kerosene

=== Cruise missile (M-42) ===
- Engine: 1× RD-020 ramjet
- Speed : Mach 3.1–3.2
- Range: 8,500 km
- Flight altitude: 18–20 km
- Warhead: thermonuclear, 3500 kg
- Length: 23.3 m
- Diameter: 2.40 m
- Wing span: 11.6 m
- Wing area: 98 m^{2}

=== Comparable missiles ===
- SM-62 Snark
- SM-64 Navaho
- Burya
