= Wright XRJ47 =

1950s American ramjet engine

XRJ47
- Type: Ramjet
- National origin: United States
- Manufacturer: Wright Aeronautical

The Wright XRJ47 was an American ramjet engine developed in the 1950s to help propel the rocket-launched SM-64 Navaho supersonic intercontinental cruise missile. Although the design flight Mach Number was 2.75, a peak flight speed of Mach 3.0, at altitudes up to about 77,000 ft, was envisaged. This very large ramjet had a number of design problems, including some difficulty in light-up. Development of the Navaho missile was cancelled along with the ramjet engine in 1957.

== Design ==
The single cone supersonic intake supplied ram air to a long annular diffuser terminating at the aft-mounted cylindrical combustion chamber. The centreline of the intake system was gently curved, presumably to line up the intake face with the flow-field of the missile nose section.

The combustion chamber flame-holder consisted of a center-body pilot region, with three annular V-gutters interconnected by slanted radial V-gutters. Fuel jets were of variable area design.

A heat-shield, with multiple exit ports, provided cooling air for the jetpipe and the fixed area ratio convergent-divergent propelling nozzle. The exit diameter of the nozzle equaled that of the combustion chamber.

== Specifications (XRJ47-W-5) ==
Data from Aircraft Engine Characteristics Summary: Ram-jet XRJ47-W-5, Preliminary evaluation of flight-weight XRJ47-W-5 ram-jet engine at a Mach number of 2.75

==== General characteristics ====
- Type: Ramjet
- Length: 390 in (9,900 mm) combustion chamber plus ducting and diffuser
- Diameter: 48 in (1,200 mm) (combustion chamber)
- Intake lip area: 636 sq in (4,100 cm^{2})
- Combustion chamber area: 1,810 sq in (11,700 cm^{2})
- Nozzle throat geometric area: 1,182 sq in (7,630 cm^{2})
- Nozzle exit geometric area: 1,810 sq in (11,700 cm^{2})
- Dry weight: 1,011 lb (459 kg)

==== Components ====
- Compressor: Ramjet inlet/diffuser
- Combustors: approx 1,887 K (2,937 °F; 1,614 °C)
- Combustion efficiency: 83.3%
- Burn time: 6500 s
- Fuel type: JP-5 (F-44 / AVCAT)

==== Performance ====
- Maximum thrust: 3,792 lbf (16.87 kN)
- Air mass flow: 59.8 lb/s (27.1 kg/s)
- Fuel consumption: 10,548 lb/h (4,784 kg/h)
- Specific fuel consumption: 2.782 lb/lbf/h (283.7 kg/kN/h)
- Thrust-to-weight ratio: 3.75
