= Dvina =

Dvina may refer to:

- Western Dvina, one of the names of Daugava, a river in Russia, Belarus, and Latvia
- Northern Dvina, a river in northern Russia
- R-12 Dvina, a theatre ballistic missile from the Soviet Union
- S-75 Dvina, a surface-to-air guided missile from the Soviet Union

== See also ==
- Dvinia, a late Permian therapsid
