= R-12 Dvina =

R-12
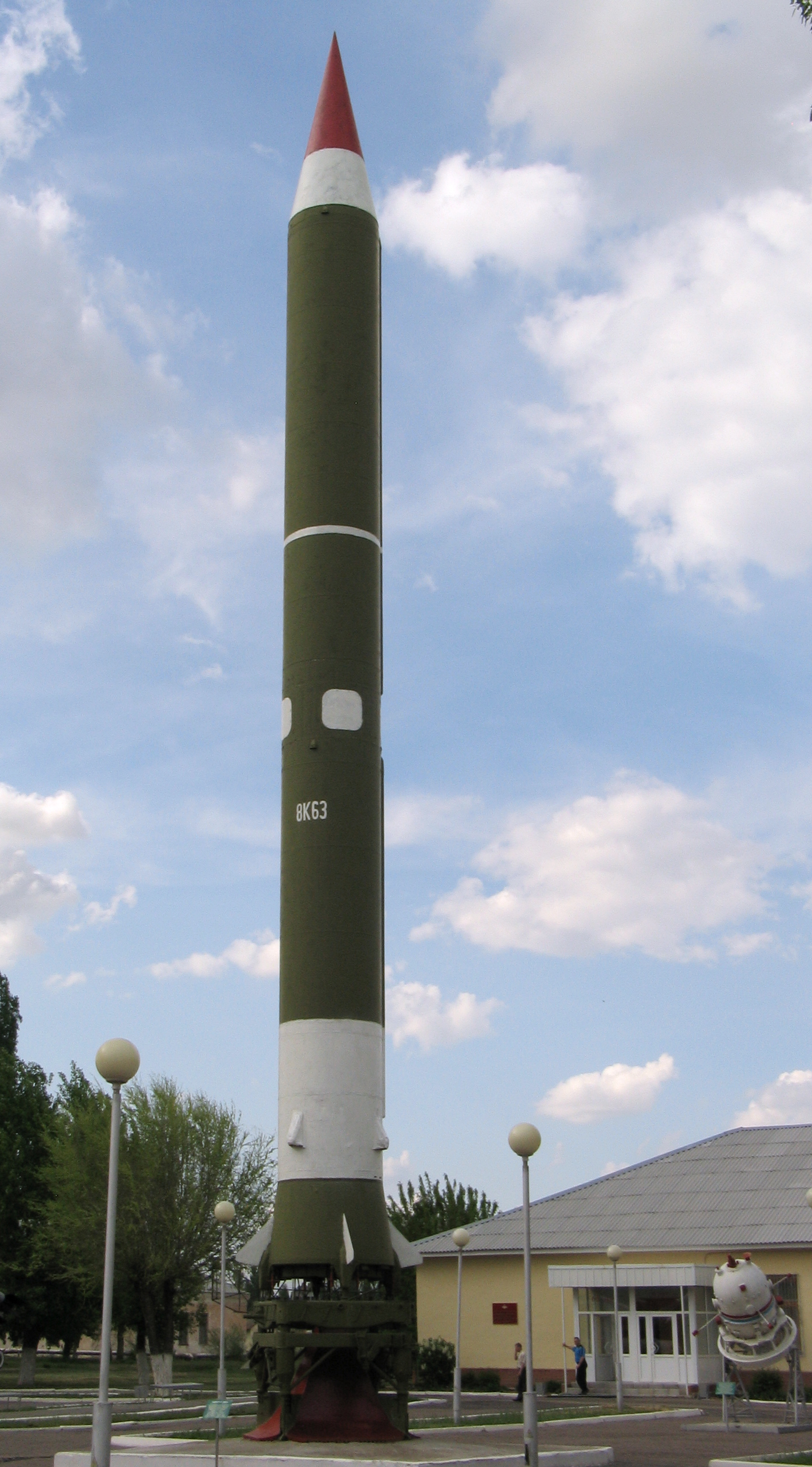
- Soviet R-12 (NATO designation SS-4) in Kapustin Yar museum, Znamensk, Russia.
- Type: Medium-range ballistic missile

Service history
- In service: 4 March 1959–1993

Production history
- Manufacturer: Yuzhmash
- Unit cost: unknown

Specifications
- Mass: Fully loaded: 41.7 t Empty: 3.15 t
- Length: 22,100 mm
- Diameter: 1,650 mm
- Wingspan: 2,940 mm (116 in)
- Warhead: Thermonuclear
- Blast yield: 1.0–2.3 Mt
- Engine: RD-214; 635.2 kilonewtons (142,800 lbf)
- Payload capacity: 1.6 t
- Propellant: liquid (AK-27I / TM-185)
- Fuel capacity: 37 t
- Operational range: 2,000–2,500 km (1,200–1,600 mi)
- Maximum speed: 3,530 m/s (Mach 10)
- Guidance system: autonomous inertial
- Accuracy: 2.4–5.16 km (1.49–3.21 mi) CEP
- Launch platform: open-launch and silo-based

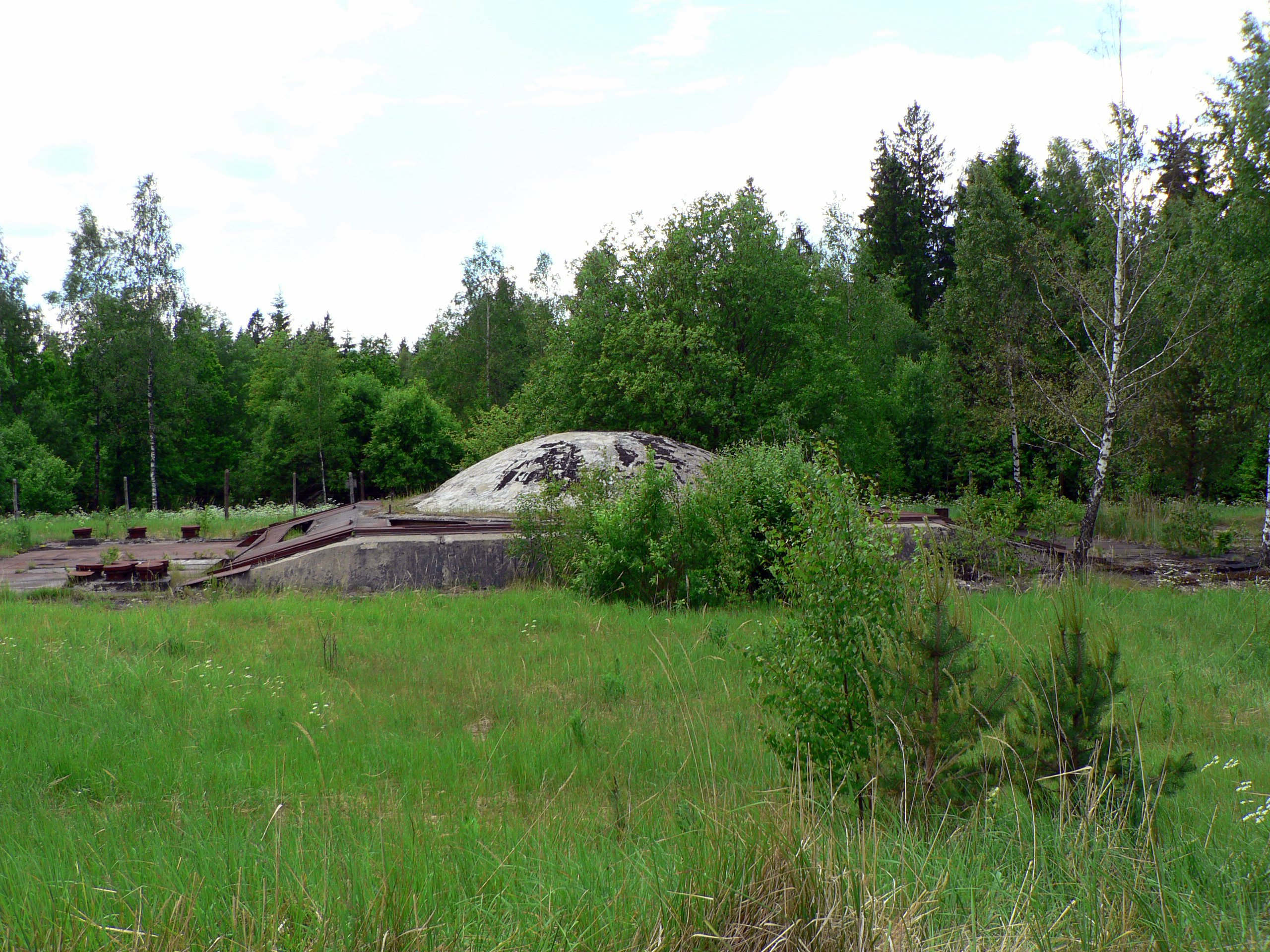
The cupola of the underground R-12U launching silo in Plokštinė missile base, Lithuania

The R-12 Dvina was a theatre ballistic missile developed and deployed by the Soviet Union during the Cold War. Its GRAU designation was 8K63 (8K63U or 8K63У in Cyrillic for silo-launched version), and it was given the NATO reporting name of SS-4 Sandal. The R-12 rocket provided the Soviet Union with the capability to attack targets at medium ranges with a megaton-class thermonuclear warhead and constituted the bulk of the Soviet offensive missile threat to Western Europe. Deployments of the R-12 missile in Cuba caused the Cuban Missile Crisis in 1962. A total of 2335 missiles were produced; all were destroyed in 1993 under the START II treaty.

As well as the single-stage ballistic technology, the R-12 Dvina had a two-stage capability that allowed payloads to be placed into low Earth orbit.

According to Janes, the Iranian Shahab-4 project was possibly an offshoot of the R-12 Dvina, or an enlarged Shahab-3 missile incorporating some technologies from the R-12 to improve performance.

== History ==
=== Beginning ===
OKB-586 in Dnipropetrovsk (The Union of Soviet Socialist Republics) formed from a spin-off of portions of Sergei Korolev's OKB-1 production infrastructure from near Moscow under the direction of Mikhail Yangel in the early 1950s. Soon after, he started the development of an improved strategic missile that would outperform the R-5, that Korolev was in the process of bringing into production. Yangel's design was based on combining the basic airframe from the R-5 with an engine developed from the R-11 Zemlya. The R-11 was a short-range missile that used nitric acid as an oxidizer and kerosene as a fuel and could be stored for extended periods of time.

Valentin Glushko had long advocated using storable propellants, and proposed developing a new engine for the project. Earlier designs like the R-5 and R-7 used liquid oxygen as the oxidizer, and therefore had to be fueled immediately before launch, as the oxygen would "boil off" over time. He developed the RD-214 for the R-12, which consisted of four combustion chambers sharing a common turbopump assembly. The pumps were powered by decomposing hydrogen peroxide, like earlier designs, to generate an exhaust. The new engine was too large to fit in the existing R-5 airframe, so a conical tail section was added to hold the engine.

Nikolay Pilyugin, head of the leading control system bureau, convinced Yangel to introduce a fully autonomous control system in the R-12 instead of the traditional radio control that had been used on earlier missiles. The R-5, for instance, used an inertial guidance system that had to be "fine tuned" by commands from ground radio stations that it passed over during its flight. Pilyugin felt that newer inertial systems would have the accuracy needed to hit targets at 2,000 km without the mid-course updates.

According to the official NPO Yuzhnoye history, Yangel's design was approved on 13 February 1953 by the Council of Ministers of the USSR. However, another source reports that the approval was granted on 13 August 1955. The first test was conducted at Kapustin Yar in Astrakhan region, Russia, on 22 June 1957. In September 1958, Nikita Khrushchev personally visited Kapustin Yar to witness the launch of R-12, as well as its competitor, the R-5M. The latter had already been accepted into deployment at the time. The R-12 launch was a success and the next month, mass production of the vehicle started at Yuzhmash (Pivdenmash) in Dnepropetrovsk. Test launches continued until December and demonstrated a maximum error of 2.3 km.

For the work on R-12, on 1 July 1959, OKB-586 received the Order of Lenin, while the Hero of Socialist Labor (the highest industrial award) was awarded to Yangel, Smirnov and Budnik.

=== Deployment ===
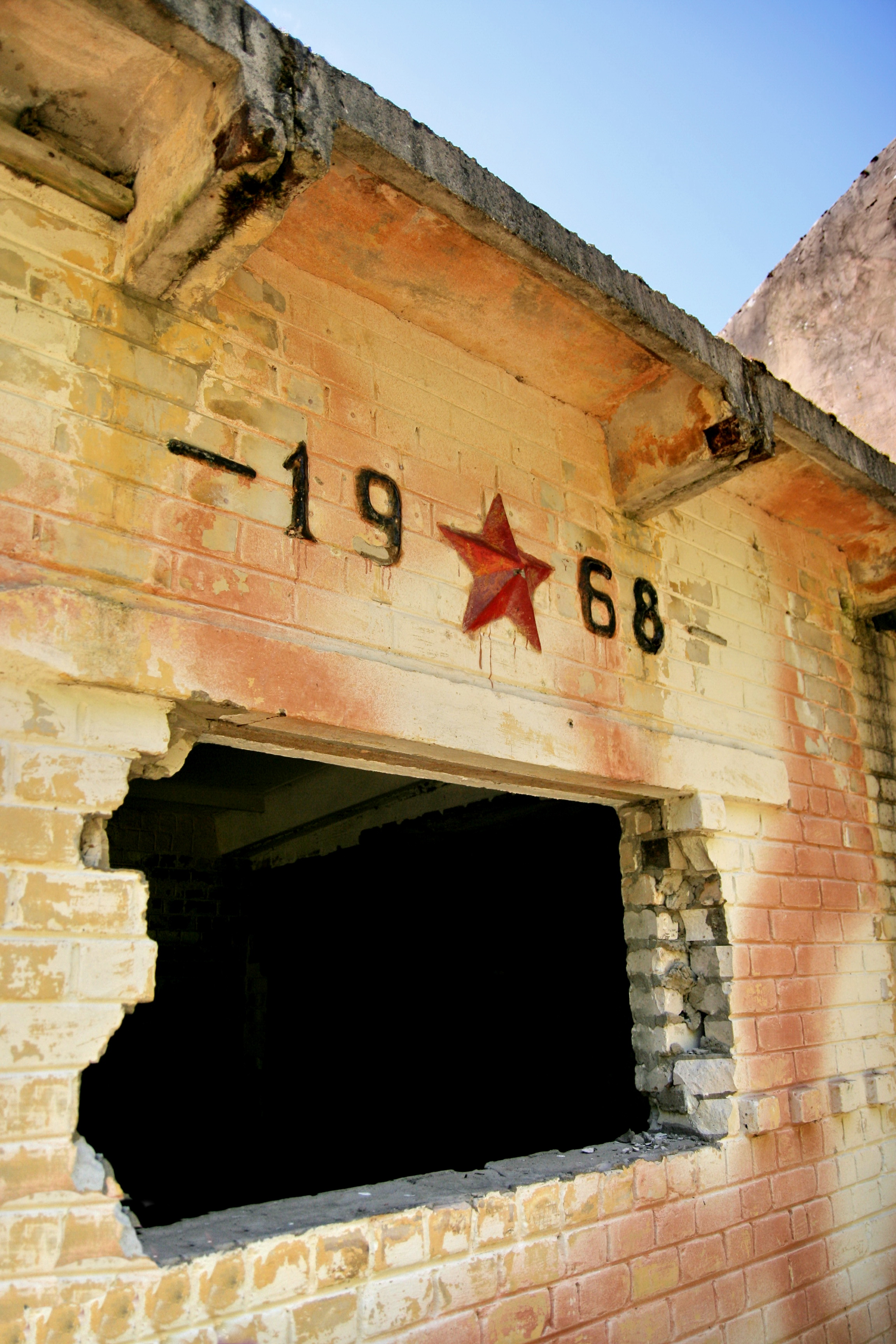
Remaining wall of the rocket base barracks near Vepriai, Lithuania. Construction date visible

The R-12 missile was introduced into the inventory on 4 March 1959 according to Russian sources, though Western intelligence believed that an initial operational capability was reached in late 1958.

The first public display of this system was in November 1960, and they were deployed to Cuba in October 1962 during the Cuban Missile Crisis. The first five regiments with surface-based R-12 missiles were put on alert in May 1960, while the first regiment of silo-based missiles was placed on alert in January 1963. Their reaction time was assessed by the West at one to three hours in the normal soft-site readiness condition, and five to fifteen minutes in the normal hard-site readiness condition. The allowable hold time in a highly alert condition (reaction time equals three to five minutes) was long—many hours for soft sites, and days for hard sites.

The R-12 and R-12U missiles reached their maximum operational launcher inventory of 608 in 1964–66. Some soft-site phase-out began in 1968, with some hard-site phase-out beginning in 1972. In 1978 their phase out and replacement with mobile ground-launched RSD-10 Pioneer missiles began.

=== Further development ===
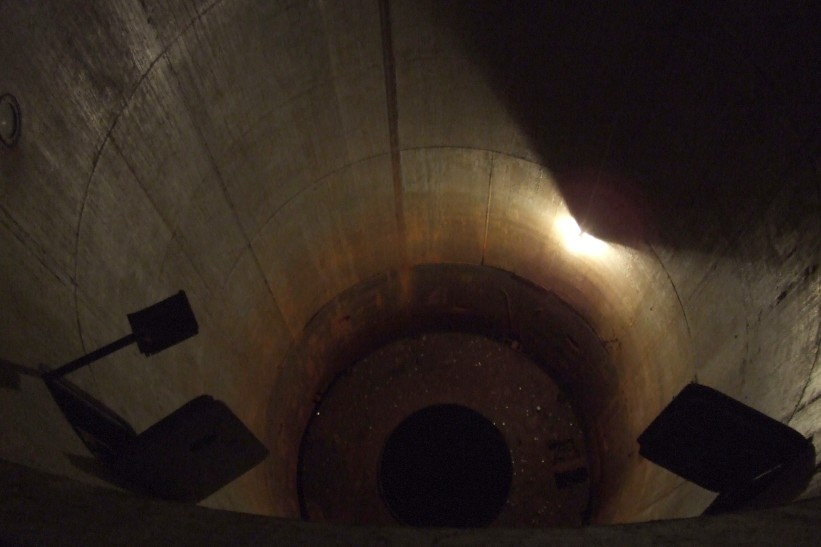
Inside the underground R-12U launching silo in Plokštinė missile base, Lithuania

Efforts to create a railway based version of the R-12 missile were suspended, but work then started on a silo-launched version. An underground launch complex, code-named Mayak-2 (Beacon-2), was constructed in Kapustin Yar. In September 1959 the R-12 took off from the silo complex for the first time. In May 1960 the development of a new R-12 missile designated as R-12U was begun. The R-12U was designed to be used with both surface launchers and silos. The silo-launch complex of the R-12U missile comprised four launchers and was designated as "Dvina" (Russian: 8П763 «Двина»; English: Dvina)". The testing phase of the missile and the launch complex lasted from December 1961 until December 1963.

The R-12 was also used during the development of the V-1000 anti-ballistic missile, serving as a target. During a series of tests two R-12s detonated their warheads in the upper atmosphere in order to test radar systems. A follow-on test planned to launch an R-12 from Kapustin Yar while two R-9s from Tyuratam would fly into the area, but only the R-12 launched successfully.

=== Elimination ===
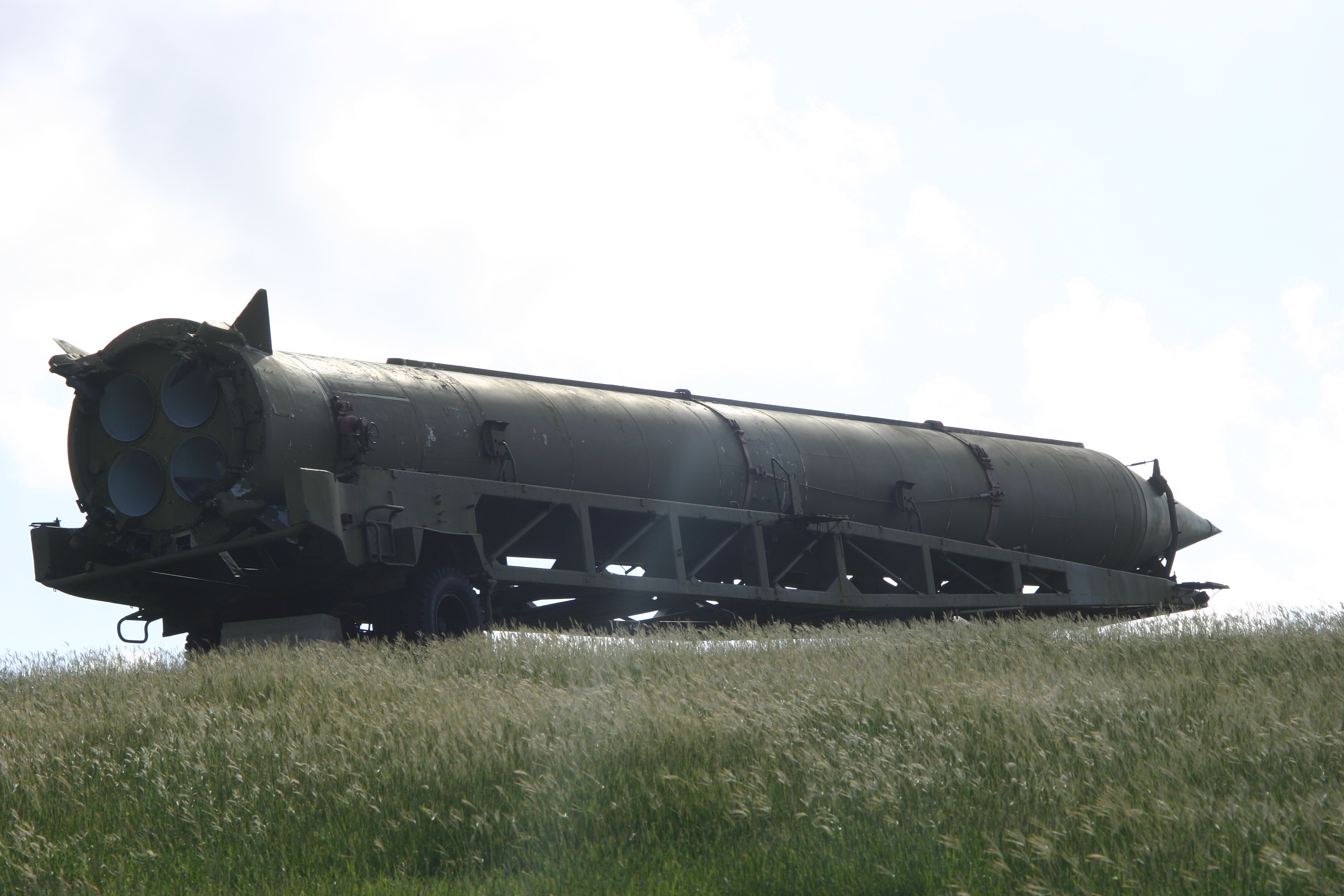
Mock-up of the R-12 at the ground transporter in the Missile Crisis museum near Cabaña Fortress, Havana, Cuba

The Intermediate-Range Nuclear Forces Treaty was signed in December 1987 and entered into force in June 1988. The fundamental purpose of the INF Treaty was to eliminate and ban US and Soviet ground-launched ballistic and cruise missiles, as well as associated support equipment, with ranges between 500 and 5500 kilometers. Elimination of R-12 and R-14 Chusovaya missiles and components took place at the Lesnaya Missile Elimination Facility. The last of the 149 Soviet R-12 missiles was eliminated at Lesnaya in May 1990.

== Space launcher variants ==
=== Rockets with new booster ===
In 1961, an upper stage using LOX and UDMH propellants was added to the R-12 to create the Kosmos 63S1 booster. Since there were no surface pads for the R-12, all launches took place from the Mayak silo at Kapustin Yar. However, as silos were not designed for repeated use, this arrangement proved impractical and necessitated their refurbishment after every few launches. The first two launch attempts of the 63S1 took place in October and December 1961 and both failed. On March 16, 1962, Kosmos 1, a navigation test satellite, was successfully orbited, marking the first Soviet space launch to be performed with a booster other than the R-7. Finally, a dedicated launch complex was constructed at Kapustin Yar and first used in December 1964.

An enhanced R-12 booster was flown in 1965–67 from the Dvina silo at Kapustin Yar on suborbital tests, eventually giving way to the 11K63, a modernized, improved launch vehicle. In 1967, a second launch complex was opened at Plesetsk and from there on, 11K63 flights alternated between Kapustin Yar and Plesetsk, mostly for orbiting lightweight scientific and military payloads. A total of 123 were flown, of which eight failed to attain orbit. In 1977, the R-12 and 11K63 were retired from use.

== Description ==
=== Overview ===
The R-12 is a single-stage rocket with a separable single reentry vehicle. In the integrated fuel tanks the oxidizer was put forward of the fuel tank, separated by an intermediate plate. During flight this allowed the oxidizer from the lower unit to be spent first, improving in-flight stabilization. The propulsion system consists of four liquid propellant rocket motors with a common turbo pump unit. The flight control was carried out with the help of four carbon jet vanes, located in the nozzles of the rocket motors. The autonomous guidance and control system used center of mass normal and lateral stabilization devices, a velocity control system and a computer-assisted automatic range control system. The R-12 was deployed at both soft launch pads and hard silos.

The standard yield was 2.3 megatons. Conventional explosives or chemical weapons could have been used as well.

=== R-12 steps of readiness ===
Readiness nr. 4 (constant). The missile was in the hangar. The gyroscopes (control devices) and warhead were not installed, the missile was not fueled. The missile could stay so for seven years (factory-guaranteed service time). It would take 3 hours and 25 minutes to launch.

Readiness nr. 3 (elevated). The missile was in the hangar. The gyroscopes and warhead were installed. The missile could stay so for three years. It would take 2 hours and 20 minutes to launch.

Readiness nr. 2 (first step elevated). The missile was transported to the launch site, the gyroscopes were started, and initial data inserted. Propellant tankers stood next to the missile. The missile could stay so for three months. It would take 1 hour to launch.

Readiness nr. 1 (total). The missile was fueled and targeted, but the starting mixture gas was not loaded. The missile could stay so for one month. It would take 30 minutes to launch.

== Operators ==
Soviet Union

- Strategic Rocket Forces − Scrapped
  - 58th Rocket Division
  - other rocket divisions
