= SM-64 Navaho =

1950s supersonic intercontinental cruise missile

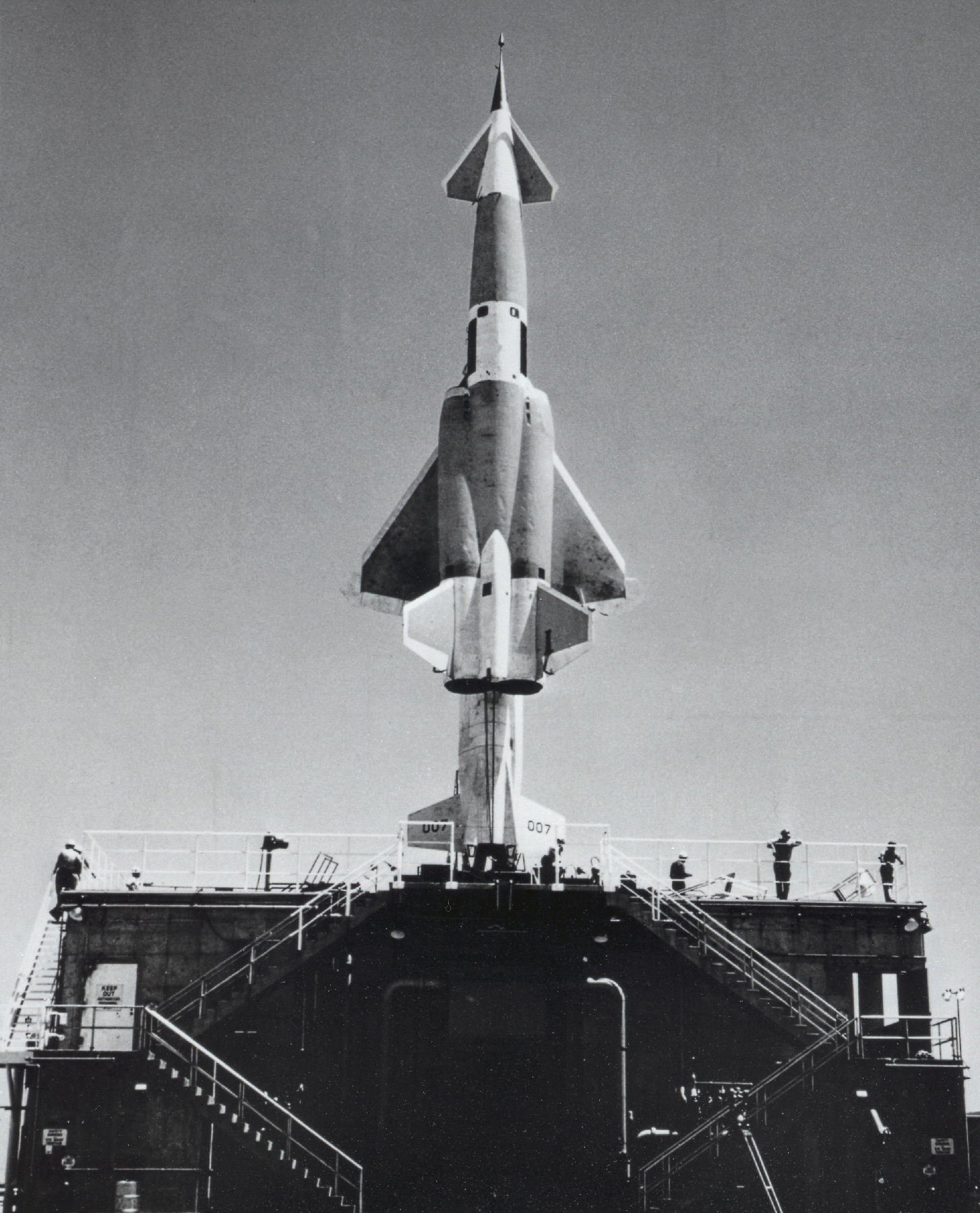
Navaho missile on launch pad

The North American SM-64 Navaho was a supersonic intercontinental cruise missile project built by North American Aviation (NAA). The final design was capable of delivering a nuclear weapon to the USSR from bases within the US, while cruising at Mach 3 (3,700 km/h; 2,300 mph) at 60,000 feet (18,000 m) altitude. The missile was named after the Navajo Nation, starting with "NA" for North American; it is sometimes stated to also be an acronym for North American Vehicle, Alcohol, Hydrogen peroxide, Oxygen, referring to the missile's propellants.

The original 1946 project called for a relatively short-range system, a boost-glide weapon based on a winged V-2 rocket design. Over time the requirements were repeatedly extended, both due to the US Air Force's desire for longer ranged systems, as well as competition from similar weapons that successfully filled the shorter-range niche. This process led to a new design based on a ramjet powered cruise missile, which also developed into a series of ever-larger versions, along with the booster rockets to launch them up to speed.

Through this period the US Air Force was developing the SM-65 Atlas, based on rocket technology developed for Navaho. Atlas filled the same performance goals but could do so with total flight times measured in minutes rather than hours, and flying at speeds and altitudes which made them immune to interception, as opposed to merely very difficult to intercept as in the case of Navaho. With the launch of Sputnik 1 in 1957 and the ensuing fears of a missile gap, Atlas received the highest development authority. Navaho continued as a backup, before being canceled in 1958 when Atlas successfully matured.

Although Navaho did not enter service, its development provided useful research in a number of fields. A version of the Navaho airframe powered by a single turbojet became the AGM-28 Hound Dog, which was carried towards its targets on the Boeing B-52 Stratofortress and then flew the rest of the way at about Mach 2. The guidance system was used to guide the first Polaris submarines. The booster engine design, spun off to NAA's new Rocketdyne subsidiary, was used in various versions of the Atlas, PGM-11 Redstone, PGM-17 Thor, PGM-19 Jupiter, Mercury-Redstone, and the Juno series; it is therefore the direct ancestor of the engines used to launch the Saturn I and Saturn V Moon rockets.

== Development ==
=== Postwar Army missile studies ===
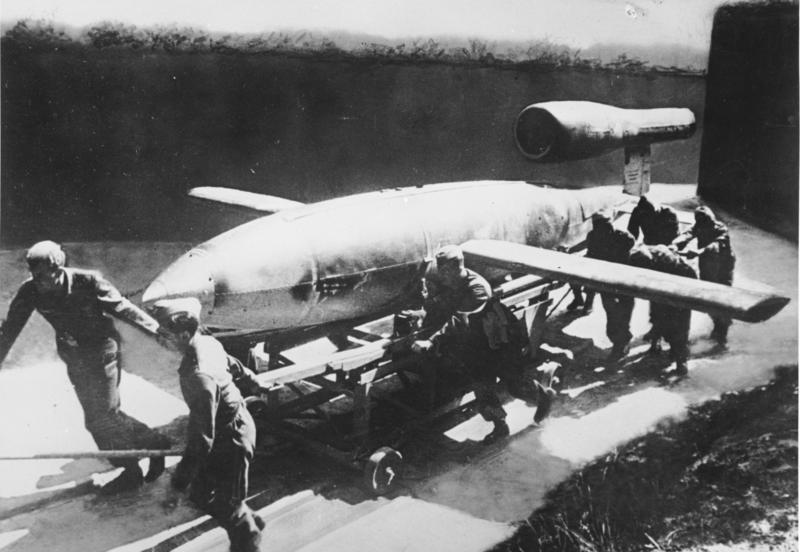
The V-1 inspired a range of US Army Air Force missile designs.

The Germans had introduced a number of new "wonder weapons" during the war that were of great interest to all the allied forces. Jet engines were already widely used after their introduction in the UK, but the V-1 flying bomb and V-2 rocket represented technologies that had not been developed elsewhere. In German use these weapons had relatively little strategic effect and had to be fired in the thousands to cause any real damage. But if armed with a nuclear weapon, even a single such weapon would cause damage equivalent to thousands of conventionally armed versions, and this line of research was quickly taken up by the US Army Air Force (USAAF) in late 1944.

Vannevar Bush of the USAAF's Scientific Advisory Board was convinced that manned or automated aircraft like the V-1 were the only possible solution for long range roles. A ballistic missile capable of carrying even the smallest warhead was "at least ten years away", and when asked directly about the topic, noted:

In my opinion, such a thing is impossible. I don't think anybody in the world knows how to do such a thing and I feel confident it will not be done for a very long time to come.

Army planners began planning for a wide variety of post-war missile systems that varied from short-range ballistic missiles to long range flying bombs. After considerable internal debate among Army branches, in August 1945 these were codified in a classified document outlining many such systems, among them a variety of cruise missiles, essentially V-1s with extended range and the greater payload needed to carry a nuclear warhead. There were three broad outlines depending on range, one for a missile flying 175 to 500 miles (282–805 km), another 500 to 1,500 miles (800–2,410 km), and finally one for 1,500 to 5,000 miles (2,400–8,000 km). Both subsonic and supersonic designs would be considered.

=== Competing designs ===
The various proposals were sent to seventeen aviation firms on 31 October 1945. Of the many proposals received, six companies were granted development contracts. Submissions for the longer-range requirements were all based on cruise missile designs, while the shorter-range examples were a mixture of designs. These were assigned designations in keeping with the USAAF's Experimental Engineering Section's "MX" series.

NAA chief designer, Dutch Kindelberger, was convinced missiles were the future, and hired William Bollay from the US Navy's Bureau of Aeronautics to run their newly formed research laboratory. Bollay had previously run the Navy's turbojet development. Bollay arrived to find the Army proposals, and decided to submit a short-range design based on a winged ballistic missile based on the German A-4b design (sometimes known as the A-9), a development of the basic V-2. On 24 March 1946, NAA received letter contract W33-038-ac-1491 for this missile, designated MX-770. The initial design called for a range of 500 miles (800 km) with a 2,000-pound (910 kg) payload, but on 26 July this was increased to 3,000 pounds (1,400 kg).

A number of other designs were also accepted, but these were all cruise missile designs to fill the longer range requirements. These were Martin's MX-771-A for a subsonic missile and -B for a supersonic version, MX-772-A and -B from Curtiss-Wright, MX-773-A and -B from Republic Aircraft, and MX-775-A and -B from Northrop. It was intended that one subsonic and one supersonic design would be put into production, and these were granted the designations SSM-A-1 and SSM-A-2, respectively. The only ballistic missile in the group, MX-774, went to Consolidated-Vultee.

When President Harry S. Truman ordered a massive cut in military spending for FY1947, as part of the Truman Doctrine, the USAAF was forced to make major cuts to their missile development program. Missile funding was cut from $29 million to $13 million (from $418 million to $187 million in today's dollars). In what became known as "the black Christmas of 1946", many of the original projects were cancelled, with the remaining companies working on a single design instead of two. Only Martin continued development of a subsonic design, their MX-771-A, delivering the first SSM-A-1 Matador in 1949. The rest of the companies were told to work only on supersonic designs.

=== Engine work ===
NAA began experimenting with rocket engines in 1946, firing the rockets in the company parking lot and protecting the cars by parking a bulldozer in front of the engines. They first used a 1,100-pound-force (4,900 N) design from Aerojet, and then designed their own model of 300 pounds-force (1,300 N). By the spring of 1946, captured German data was being disseminated around the industry. In June 1946 the team decided to abandon their own designs and build a new engine based on the V-2's Model 39.

In late 1946, two Model 39 engines were sent to NAA for study, where they were referred to as the XLR-41 Mark I. "XLR" referred to "eXperimental Liquid Rocket", a new designation system being used by the Army Air Force. They used these as the basis for conversion from metric to SAE measurements and US construction techniques, which they called the Mark II.

During this period, the company received a number of late-war reports on developments of a Model 39a engine for the V-2, which replaced the original model's eighteen separate combustion chambers with a single "shower head" plate inside a single larger chamber. This not only simplified the design, it also made it lighter and improved performance. The Germans were never able to get this working due to combustion instability and continued using the earlier design in spite of lower performance.

The team that had designed the engine was now in the United States after being captured as part of Operation Paperclip. Many of them were setting up a new Army-funded research effort under the direction of Wernher von Braun. The company hired Dieter Huzel to act as a coordinator between NAA and the Army missile team. In September 1947, the company began the design of an engine incorporating the showerhead design, which they called the Mark III. Initially, the goal was to match the 56,000 pounds-force (250,000 N) thrust of the Model 39, but be 15% lighter.

Work on the Mark II continued and the detailed design was completed in June 1947. In March, the company rented a large tract of land in the western San Fernando Valley north of Los Angeles, in the Santa Susana Mountains, for use in testing large engines. A rocket test center was built, using $1 million (equivalent to $14,418,778 in 2025) of corporate funds and $1.5 million (equivalent to $21,628,166.9 in 2025) from the USAAF. The first parts began to arrive in September. Development of the Mark III proceeded in parallel using a scaled-down version developing 3,300 pounds-force (15,000 N) that could be fired in the parking lot. The team made a string of changes to this and eventually cured the combustion problems.

=== Evolving design ===
Another set of German research papers received by NAA concerned work on supersonic ramjets, which appeared to make a highly supersonic cruise missile design possible. Bollay began a series of parallel design projects; Phase 1 was the original boost-glide design, Phase 2 was a design that used ramjets, and Phase 3 was a study for what sort of booster rocket would be needed to get the Phase 2 vehicle up to speed from a vertical launch system.

Meanwhile, aerodynamicists in the company discovered that the A-4b's swept wing design was inherently unstable at transonic speeds. They redesigned the missile with a delta wing at the extreme rear, and canards at the nose. Engineers working on the inertial navigation system (INS) invented an entirely new design known as the Kinetic Double-Integrating Accelerometer (KDIA) that measured not only velocity as in the V-2's version, but then integrated that to provide the location as well. This meant that the autopilot simply had to compare the target location with the current location from the INS to develop a correction, if any, that needed to bring the missile back on target.

So, by June 1947, the original A-4b design had been changed at every point; the engine, airframe and navigation systems were now all new.

=== New concept ===
In September 1947 the US Air Force was split off from the US Army. As part of the split, the forces agreed to divide ongoing development projects based on range, with the Army taking all the projects with a range of 1,000 miles (1,600 km) or less, and the Air Force everything above that. MX-770 was well below that limit, but instead of handing it over to the Army's Ordnance Department who were working with von Braun on ballistic missiles, in February 1948 the Air Force instead requested that NAA double the range of the MX-770 to put it into the Air Force's domain.

Examining the work to date, NAA abandoned the boost-glide concept and moved to the ramjet powered cruise missile as the primary design. Even with the more efficient propulsion offered by the ramjets, the missile would have to be 33% larger to achieve the required range. This required a more powerful booster engine to power the launcher, so the requirement for the XLR-41 Mark III was raised to 75,000 pounds-force (330,000 N). The N-1 INS system drifted at a rate of 1 mile per hour, so at its maximum range it would not be able to meet the Air Force's 2,500-foot (760 m) CEP. The company began development of the N-2 to fill this need and provide considerable headroom if greater range was requested. It was essentially the mechanism of the N-1 paired to a star tracker which would provide midcourse updates to correct for any accumulated drift.

The Air Force assigned the missile the XSSM-A-2 designation, and then outlined a three-stage development plan. For Phase 1, the existing design would be used for technology development and as a testbed for various launch concepts, including the original booster concept, as well as rocket-track launches and air dropped versions. Phase 2 would extend the range of the missile to 2,000 to 3,000 miles (3,200–4,800 km), and Phase 3 would further increase that to an intercontinental 5,000 miles (8,000 km) while carrying a heavier 10,000 pounds (4,500 kg) warhead. The design evolution ended in July 1950 with the Air Force of Weapon System 104A specifications. Under this new requirement the purpose of the program was the development of a 5,500-mile (8,900 km) range nuclear missile.

=== WS-104A ===
Under WS-104A, the Navaho program was broken up into three guided missile efforts. The first of these missiles was the North American X-10, a flying subrange vehicle to prove the general aerodynamics, guidance, and control technologies for vehicles two and three. The X-10 was essentially an unmanned high performance jet, powered by two afterburning Westinghouse J40 turbojets and equipped with retractable landing gear for take off and landing. It was capable of speeds up to Mach 2 and could fly almost 500 miles (800 km). Its success at Edwards AFB and then at Cape Canaveral set the stage for the development of the second vehicle: XSSM-A-4, Navaho II, or G-26.

Step two, the G-26, was a nearly full-size Navaho nuclear vehicle. Launched vertically by a liquid-fuel rocket booster, the G-26 would rocket upward until it had reached a speed of approximately Mach 3 and an altitude of 50,000 ft (15,000 m). At this point the booster would be expended and the vehicle's ramjets ignited to power the vehicle to its target. The G-26 made a total of 10 launches from Launch Complex 9 (LC-9) at Cape Canaveral Air Force Station (CCAFS) between 1956 and 1957. Launch Complex 10 (LC-10) was also assigned to the Navaho program, but no G-26s were ever launched from it (it was only used for ground tests of the planned portable launcher).

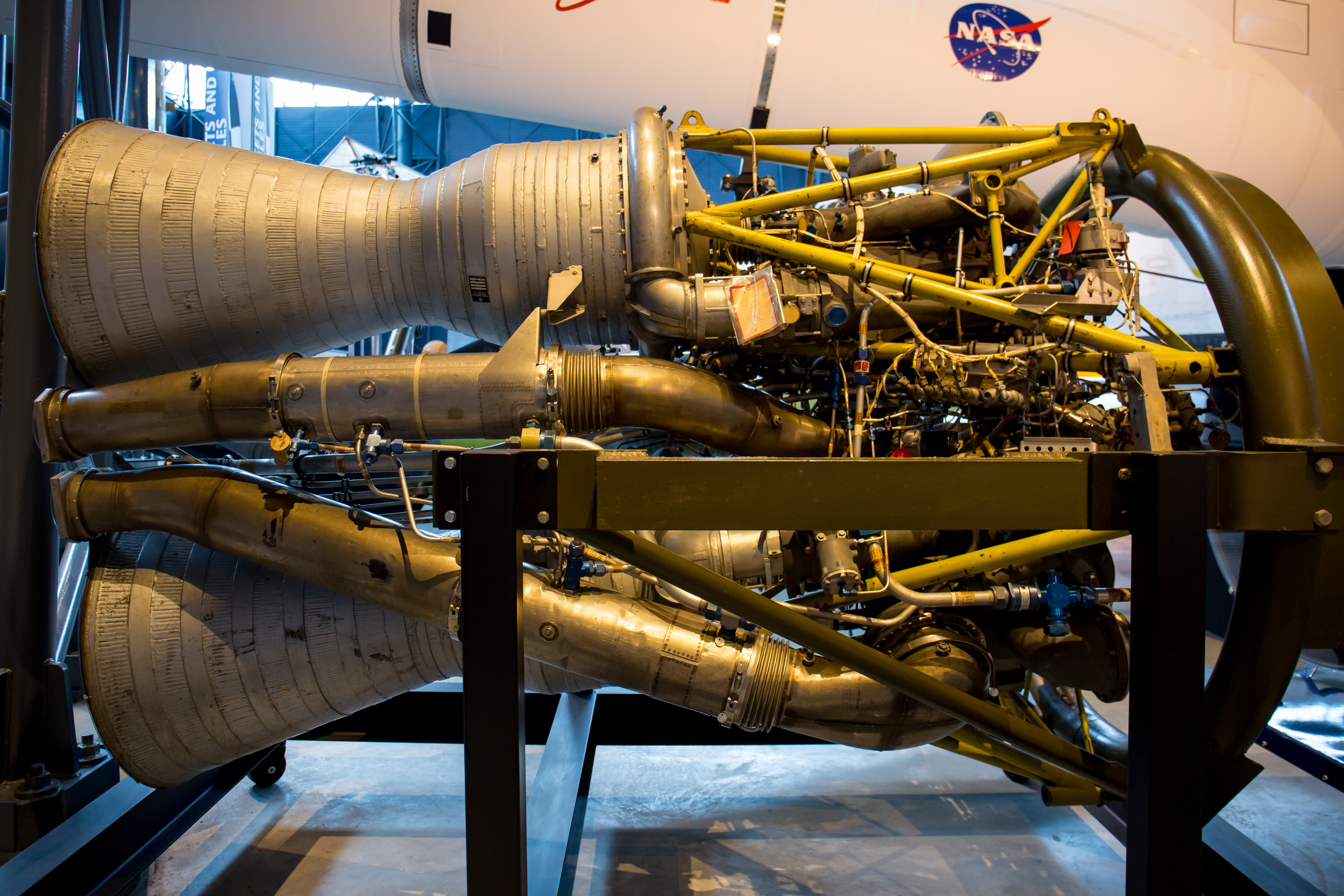
The dual engine (XLR-71-NA-1) of the SM-64 Navaho at the Udvar-Hazy Center

The final operational version, the G-38 or XSM-64A, was the same basic design as the G-26 only larger. It incorporated numerous new technologies, Titanium components, gimballed rocket engines, a Kerosene/LOX propellant combination, and full solid-state electronic controls. None were ever flown, the program being cancelled before the first unit was completed. The advanced rocket booster technology went on to be used in other missiles including the Atlas intercontinental ballistic missile and the inertial guidance system was later used as the guidance system on the first U.S. nuclear-powered submarines.

Development of the first-stage rocket engine for the Navaho began with two refurbished V-2 engines in 1947. That same year, the phase II engine was designed, the XLR-41-NA-1, a simplified version of the V-2 engine made from American parts. The phase III engine, XLR-43-NA-1 (also called 75K), adopted a cylindrical combustion chamber with the experimental German impinging-stream injector plate. Engineers at North American solved the combustion stability problem, which had prevented it being used in the V-2, and the engine was successfully tested at full power in 1951. The Phase IV engine, XLR-43-NA-3 (120K), replaced the poorly-cooled heavy German engine wall with a brazed tubular ("spaghetti") construction, which was becoming the new standard method for regenerative cooling in American engines. A dual-engine version of this, XLR-71-NA-1 (240K), was used in the G-26 Navaho. With improved cooling, a more powerful kerosene-burning version was developed for the triple-engine XLR-83-NA-1 (405K), used in the G-38 Navaho. With all the elements of a modern engine (except a bell-shaped nozzle), this led to designs for the Atlas, Thor and Titan engines.

== Operational history ==
The first launch attempt, on 6 November 1956, failed after 26 seconds of flight. Ten failed launches followed, before another got off successfully, on 22 March 1957, for 4 minutes, 39 seconds of flight. A 25 April attempt exploded seconds after liftoff, while a 26 June flight lasted only 4 minutes, 29 seconds.

Officially, the program was canceled on 13 July 1957, after the first four launches ended in failure. In reality the program was obsolete by mid-1957 as the first Atlas ICBM began flight tests in June and the Jupiter and Thor IRBMs were showing great promise. These ballistic missiles however would not have been possible without the liquid fuel rocket engine developments accomplished in the Navaho program. The launch of the Soviet Satellite Sputnik in October 1957 only finished Navaho as the Air Force shifted its research money into ICBMs. But the technologies developed for the Navaho were reused in 1957 for the development of the AGM-28 Hound Dog, a nuclear cruise missile which entered in production in 1959.

The Soviet Union had been working on parallel projects, The Myasishchev RSS-40 "Buran" and Lavochkin "Burya" and a little later, the Tupolev Tu-123. The first two types were also large rocket-boosted ramjets, while the third was a turbojet-powered machine. With the cancellation of the Navaho and the promise of ICBMs in the strategic missile role, the first two were canceled as well, though the Lavochkin project, which had some successful test flights, was carried on for research and development purposes, and the Tupolev was reworked as a big, fast reconnaissance drone.

== Operators ==
- United States: The United States Air Force canceled the program before accepting the Navaho into service.

== Surviving aircraft ==
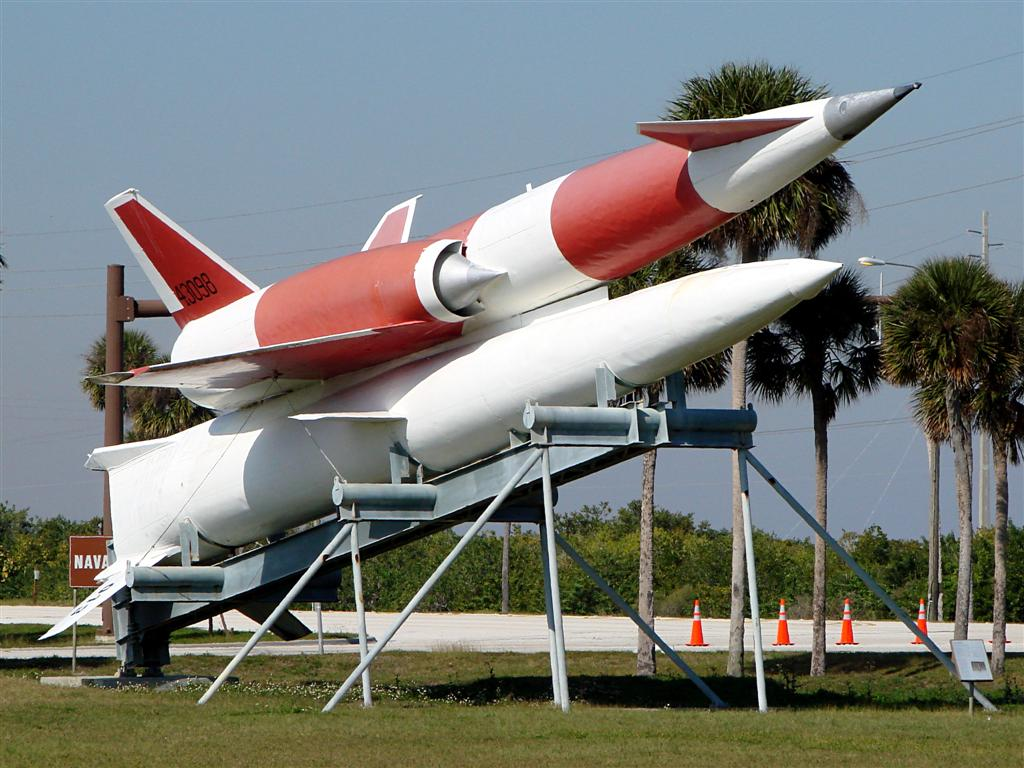
Navaho on display at CCAFS, Florida

One remaining X-10 is on display at the United States Air Force Museum Research and Development Gallery.

A Navaho booster rocket, though not marked as such, is currently displayed in front of a VFW post in Fort McCoy, Florida.

The other remaining Navaho missile is at the Cape Canaveral Space Force Station, Florida. This survivor was damaged by Hurricane Matthew in 2016, but was restored by the Space and Missile Museum Foundation and reinstalled in March 2021, and is displayed outside the south entrance gate at the Cape Canaveral Space Force Museum.

== Notable appearances in media ==
The 1960s series Men Into Space used footage of the SM-64 and X-10 tests at Edwards AFB to depict spacecraft landings on a desert runway.

== Specifications ==
Data from

General characteristics

- Length: 67 ft 11 in (20.7 m)
- Wingspan: 28 ft 7 in (8.71 m)
- Gross weight: 64,850 lb (29,420 kg)
- Powerplant: 2 × Wright Aeronautical XRJ47-W-5 ramjets, 15,000 lbf (67 kN) thrust each
- Powerplant: 2 × XLR83-NA-1 rocket boosters, 200,000 lbf (890 kN) thrust each

Performance

- Maximum speed: 1,700 kn (2,000 mph, 3,200 km/h) (design. Reality 2,500 km/h)
- Maximum speed: Mach 3
- Range: 3,500 nmi (4,000 mi, 6,500 km) (design)
- Service ceiling: 77,000 ft (23,000 m)
- Thrust/weight: 0.46

Armament

- 1 × W41 nuclear warhead

== See also ==
Aircraft of comparable role, configuration, and era

- CIM-10 Bomarc
- North American X-10
- SM-62 Snark
- Burya

Related lists

- List of military aircraft of the United States
- List of missiles
