= Glenford =

Glenford may refer to:

- Glenford (name)
- Glenford, Alberta
- Glenford, New York
- Glenford, Ohio

== See also ==
- Glenn Ford (disambiguation), including Glen Ford
