= Republic-Ford JB-2 =

Reverse engineered V-1 flying bomb

JB-2/KGW Loon
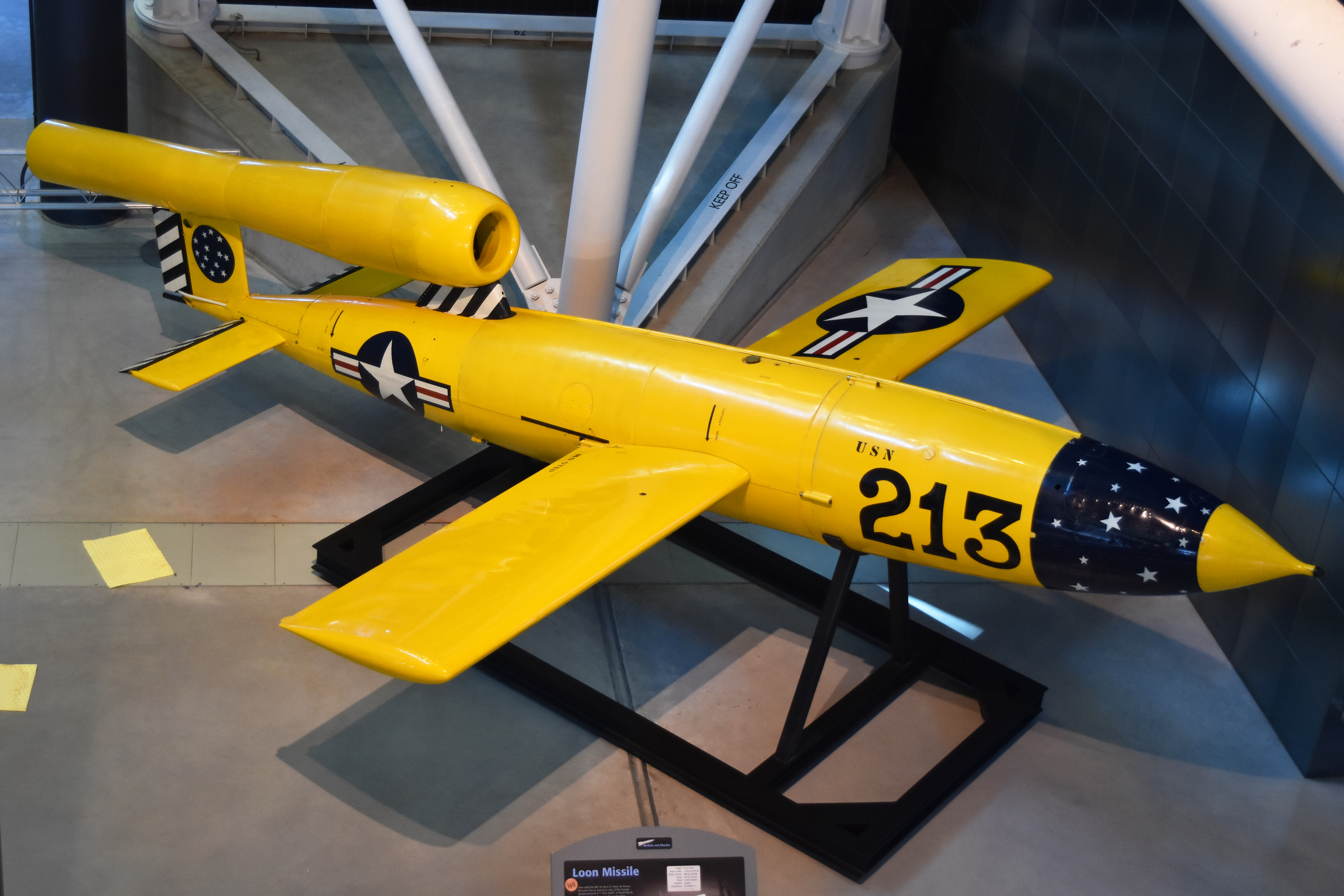
- Republic-Ford JB-2 at the Steven F. Udvar-Hazy Center. 2018
- Type: Cruise missile
- Place of origin: United States

Service history
- In service: 1945–53
- Used by: United States Army Air Forces; United States Air Force; United States Navy

Production history
- Manufacturer: Republic Aircraft; Willys-Overland; Ford Motor Company
- Produced: 1944–45
- No. built: 1,391

Specifications
- Mass: 5,000 pounds (2,300 kg)
- Length: 27 feet 1 inch (8.26 m)
- Diameter: 34 inches (860 mm)
- Wingspan: 17 feet 8 inches (5.38 m)
- Warhead: High explosive
- Warhead weight: 2,000 pounds (910 kg)
- Engine: Ford PJ31 pulsejet 660 lb_{f} (2.9 kN)
- Operational range: 150 miles (240 km)
- Maximum speed: 425 miles per hour (684 km/h)
- Guidance system: Radio command
- Accuracy: 0.25 miles (0.40 km) at 100 miles (160 km)

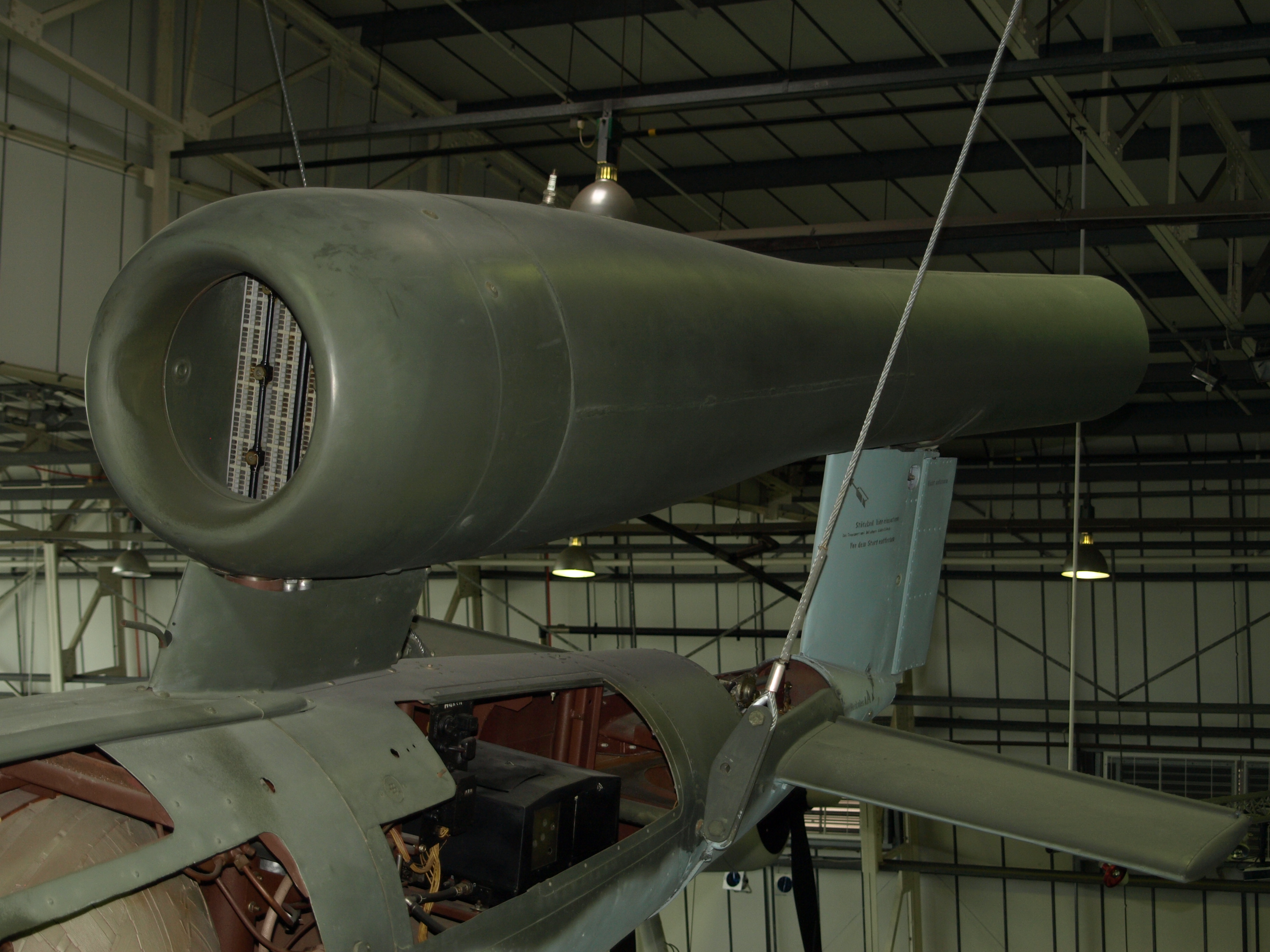
The pulsejet's forward support pylon's differing shape on the original V-1 ordnance

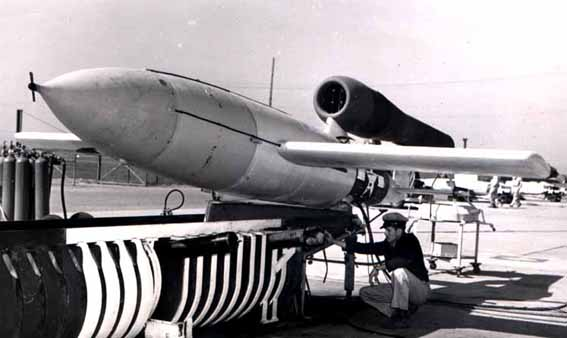
A JB-2 being inspected by USAAF personnel at Wendover AAF, 1944.

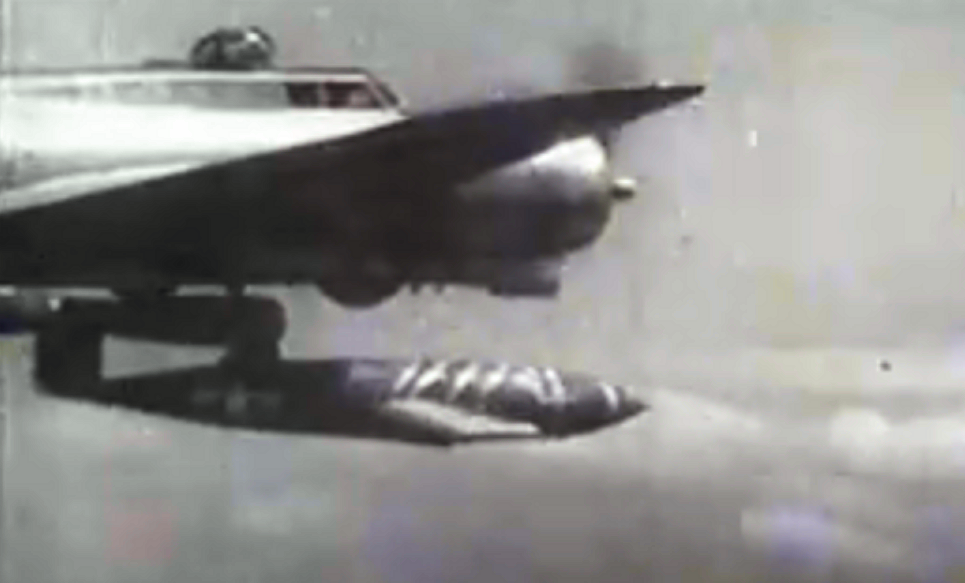
JB-2 being air launched for flight test by a Boeing B-17 during testing of the weapon at Eglin Field, 1944

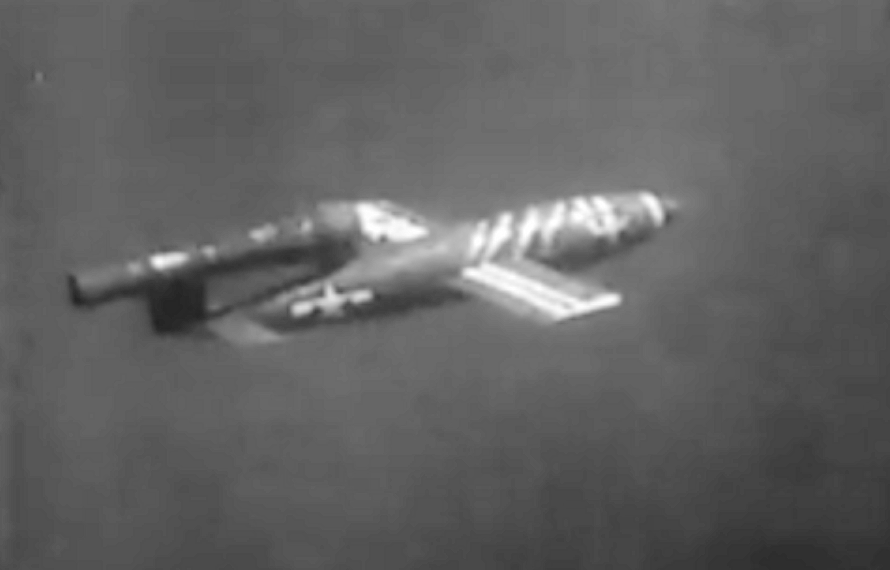
In flight after air launch, 1944

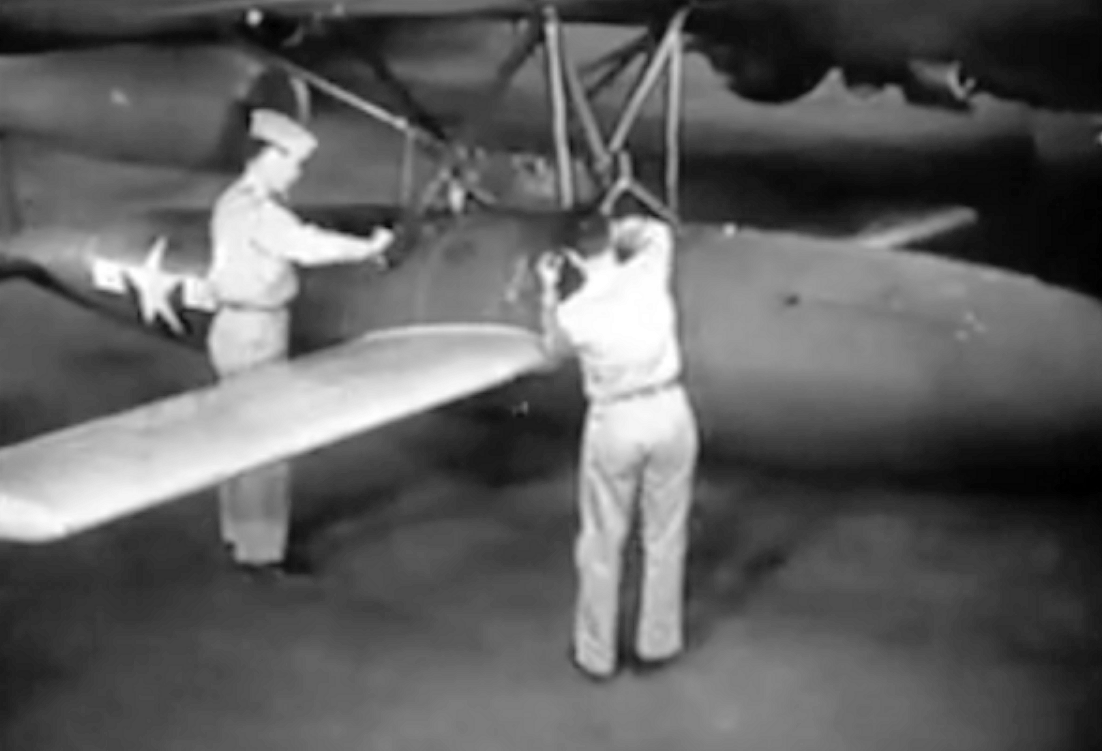
Ground preparation prior to air launch, 1944

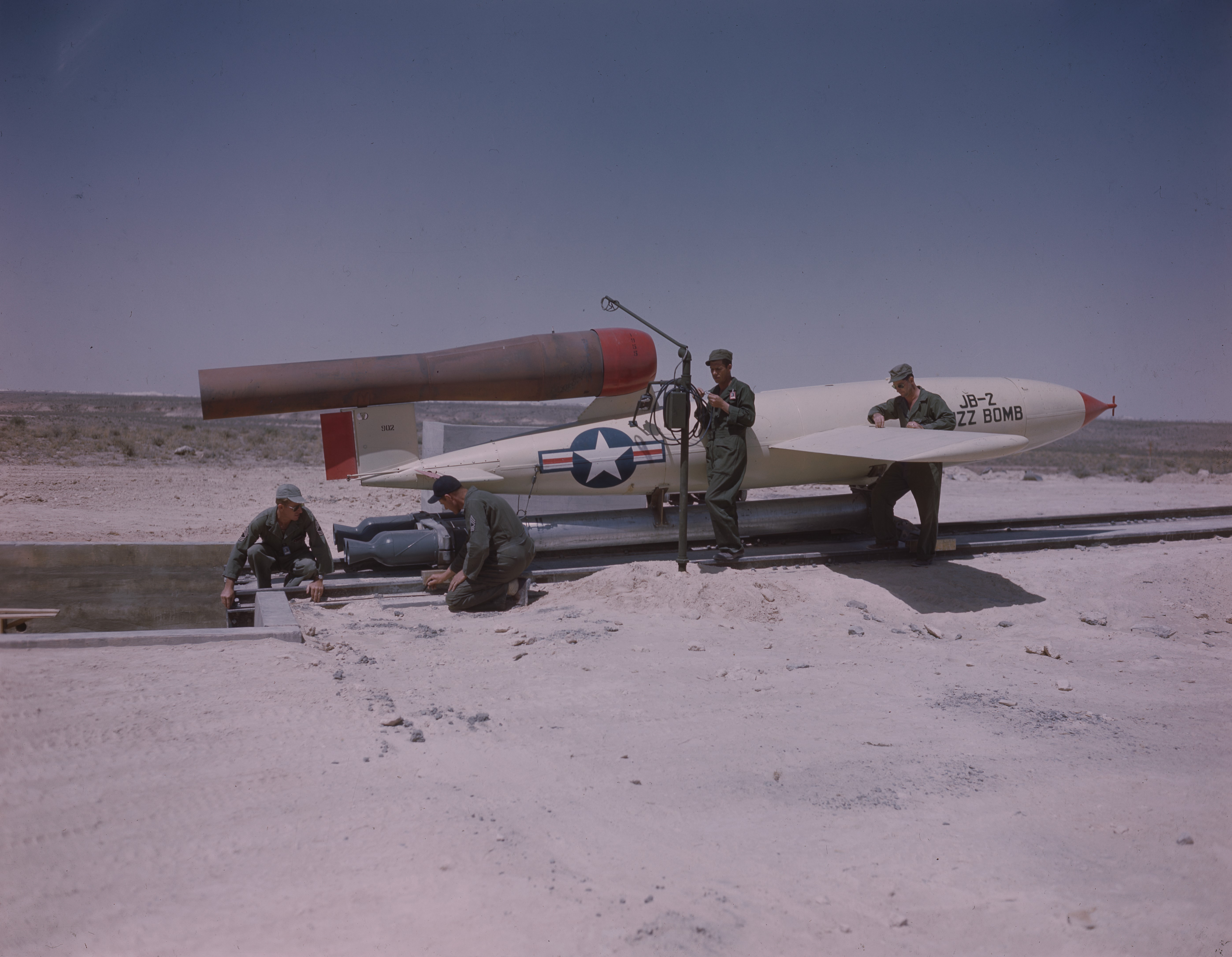
A JB-2 being prepared for a test launch at Holloman Air Force Base in May, 1948.

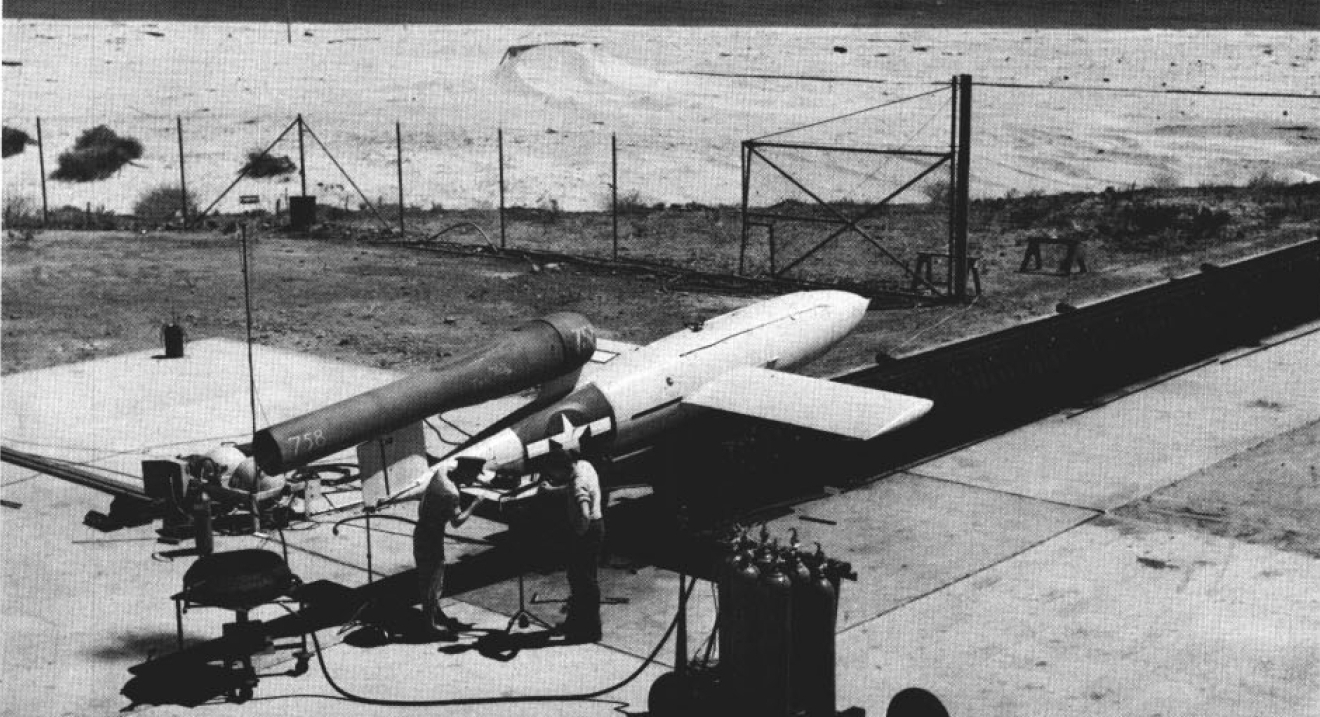
JB-2 Loon before launch at PMTC Point Mugu in 1948

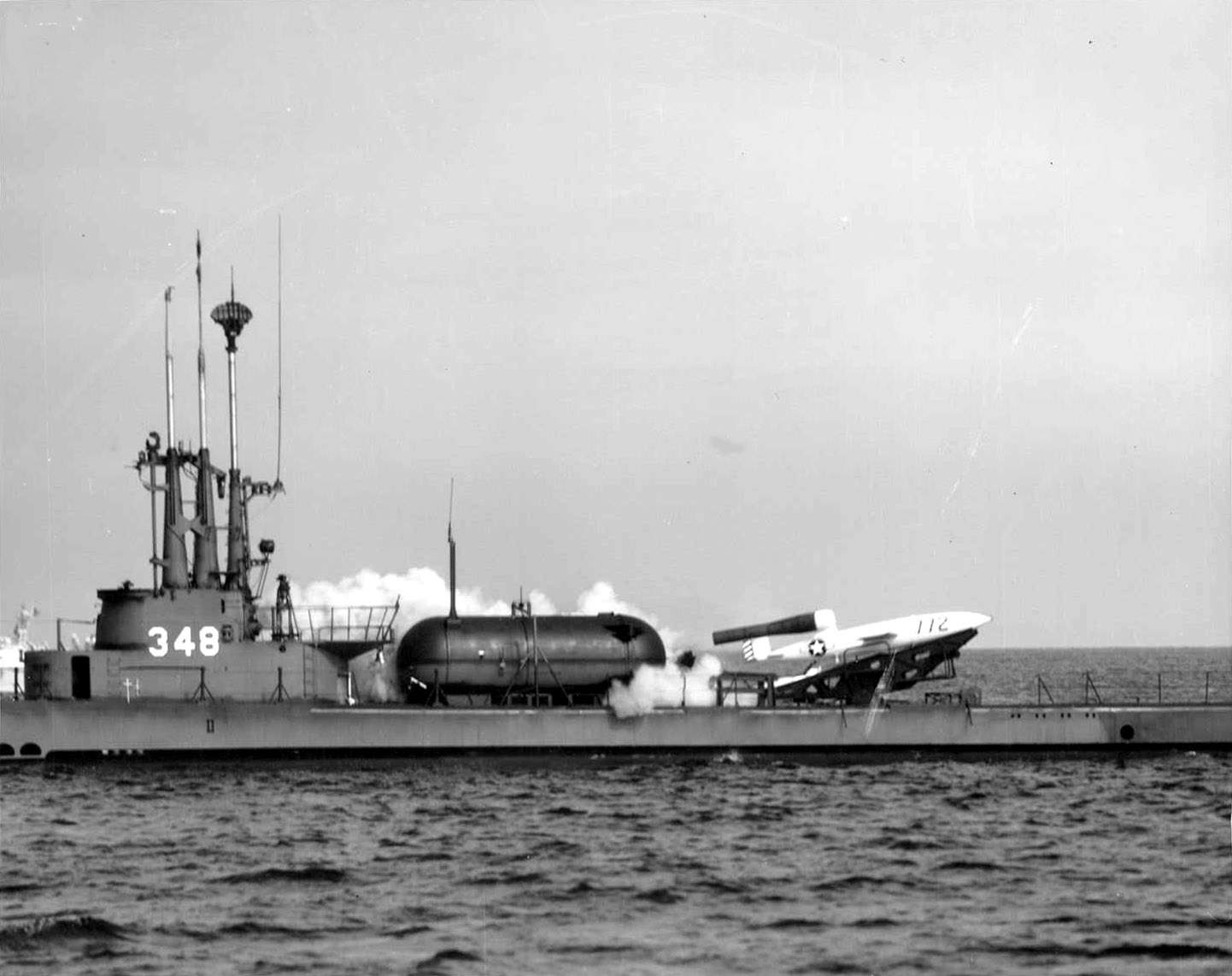
A Loon being fired from USS Cusk in 1951

The Republic-Ford JB-2, also known as the Thunderbug, KGW and LTV-N-2 Loon, was an American copy of the German V-1 flying bomb. Developed in 1944, and planned to be used in the Allied invasion of Japan (Operation Downfall), the JB-2 was never used in combat. It was the most successful of the United States Army Air Forces Jet Bomb (JB) projects (JB-1 through JB-10) during World War II. Postwar, the JB-2 played a significant role in the development of more advanced surface-to-surface tactical missile systems such as the MGM-1 Matador and later MGM-13 Mace.

== Wartime development ==
The United States had known of the existence of a new German secret weapon since 22 August 1942 when a Danish naval officer discovered an early test version of the V-1 that had crashed on the island of Bornholm, in the Baltic Sea between Germany and Sweden, roughly 120 kilometers (75 miles) northeast of the V-1 test launch ramp at the Peenemünde Army Research Center, on Germany's Usedom Island. A photograph and a detailed sketch of the V-1 test unit, the Fieseler Fi 103 V83 (Versuchs-83, the eighty-third prototype airframe) was sent to Britain. This led to months of intelligence-gathering and intelligence-sifting which traced the weapon to the airfield at Peenemünde, on Germany's Baltic Coast, the top-secret German missile test and development site.

As more intelligence data was obtained through aerial photography and sources inside Germany, the United States decided to develop a jet-powered flying bomb in 1943. The United States Army Air Forces gave Northrop Aircraft a contract in July 1944 to develop the JB-1 (Jet Bomb 1) turbojet-powered flying bomb under project MX-543. Northrop designed a flying-wing aircraft with two General Electric B1 turbojets in the center section, and two 900 kg (2000 lb) general-purpose bombs in enclosed "bomb containers" in the wing roots. To test the aerodynamics of the design, one JB-1 was completed as a manned unpowered glider, which was first flown in August 1944.

Motivated by intelligence information supplied by the United Kingdom, Project MX-544 was initiated to create an American copy of the V-1. In July 1944, three weeks after German V-1 "Buzz Bombs" first struck England on 12 and 13 June, American engineers at Wright Field fired a working copy of the German Argus As 014 pulse-jet engine, "reverse-engineered" from crashed German V-1s that were brought to the United States from England for analysis. The reverse engineering provided the design of America's first mass-produced guided missile, the JB-2. The matter of guided missiles became a jurisdictional issue between Army ground Forces and the Army Air Forces. The dispute was decided in favor of the AAF as the JB-2 had wings and flew. It was decided that the JB-2 "should be placed in combat, needed or not, as an insurance measure for AAF claims.

By 8 September, the first of thirteen complete JB-2s, reverse engineered from the material received at Wright Field in July was assembled at Republic Aviation. The United States JB-2 was different from the German V-1 only slightly in dimensions. The wing span was only 2 1/2 inches (6.4 cm) wider and the length was extended less than 2 feet (61 cm). The difference gave the JB-2 60.7 square feet (5.64 m^{2}) of wing area versus 55 square feet (5.1 m^{2}) for the V-1. One of the few visible differences between the JB-2 and the V-1 was the shape of the forward pulsejet support pylon — the original V-1 had its support pylon slightly swept back at nearly the same angle on both its leading and trailing edges, while the JB-2's pylon had a vertical leading edge and sharply swept-forward trailing edge. A similar, completely coincidental re-shaping, but with a much broader chord, was used for the same airframe component of the manned Fieseler Fi 103R Reichenberg, original V-1 ordnance development. Initial testing of the first batch of prototype missiles resulted in a decision to change from the preset guidance of the V-1 to a command guidance system utilizing a radar beacon in the missile and radio command guidance from a tracking SCR-584 radar.

With its Ford-produced PJ31 pulsejet powerplant, the JB-2 was one of the first attempts at a powered cruise missile for potential usage in America's arsenal. Early launches of JB-1, JB-2, and JB-10 missiles were from a site along the coast on Santa Rosa Island in what is now Sandestin, Florida. The land necessary was leased at $1 a year for the duration of the war. The test location was 22 miles (35 km) east of Eglin Army Air Field designated Range 64 (aka C-64) 30°12′9″N 085°50′59″W (30°23′54″N 086°41′33″W) and involved 2 1/2 miles (4.0 km) of the island’s shore line as well as extending 150 miles (240 km) off shore. Range 64 was a self-sufficient facility with not only launch and missile preparation facilities, but included barracks, mess hall and administrative facilities as well. Later a Training Unit P had to be located 1 1/2 miles (2.4 km) east of Range 64 to house men developing the techniques needed for field operations in combat while being trained to field the JB-2. Ultimately nine launch ramps of varying length and method of propulsion were built at Range 64. While copying the V-1 proved easy, inventing a means of launching proved very difficult. The first launch of a JB-2 from Range 64 was on October 12, 1944 by the 1st Proving Ground Group. A total of 233 JB-2s were launched from Range 64 between October 1944 and October 1945. All further tests at Range 64 were cancelled in November 1945 and orders were issued to deconstruct, remove or abandon everything by December 12, 1945. After the war ended the land leased for a single dollar was returned to the Coffeen family. The site of Range 64 is now the Coffeen Nature Preserve, Four Mile Village and Topsail Hill Preserve State Park in Sandestin, FL.

As the Heinkel He 111H-22 had done late in the war for the Luftwaffe in offensive air-launches of V-1s against the Allies, JB-2s were launched from MB-17G 44-85815 based at Hurlburt Field beginning in early 1945 and continued after the war ended.

In addition to Range 64, a detachment of the Special Weapons Branch, Wright Field, Ohio, arrived at Wendover Field, Utah, in 1944 with the mission of evaluating captured and experimental systems, including the JB-2. Testing was from a launch structure just south of Wendover's technical site. Unlike the missiles fired at Range 64 the ones fired at Wendover were armed and fired in the direction of a distant mountain range where their destruction by ground impact was assured. The launch area is visible in aerial imagery (40°41′53″N 114°02′29″W). Parts of crashed JB-2s are occasionally found by Wendover Airport personnel.

In December 1944, the first JB-1 was ready for launch from Range 64. The missile was launched by a rocket-propelled sled along a 150 m (500 ft) long track, but seconds after release the JB-1 pitched up into a stall and crashed. This was caused by an incorrectly calculated elevon setting for take-off, but the JB-1 program was subsequently stopped, mainly because the performance and reliability of the GE B1 turbojet engines were far below expectations. In addition, the cost to produce the Ford copy of the Argus pulse-jet engine of the JB-2 was much less than the GE turbojets. Subsequently, work proceeded on the JB-2 for final development and production.

An initial production order was 1,000 units, with subsequent production of 1,000 per month. That figure was not anticipated to be attainable until April 1945. Republic had its production lines at capacity for producing P-47 Thunderbolts, so it sub-contracted airframe manufacturing to Willys-Overland. Ford Motor Company built the engine, initially designated IJ-15-1, which was a copy of the V-1's 900-lb. thrust Argus-Schmidt pulse-jet (the Argus As 014), later designated the PJ31. Guidance and flight controls were manufactured by Jack and Heintz Company of Cleveland, Ohio, and Monsanto took on the task of designing a better launching system, with Northrop supplying the launch sleds. Production delivery began in January 1945.

Development of an improved guidance method for the JB-2 began in 1945. By April the Aircraft Radio Laboratory at Wright Field had developed a radio/radar control system utilizing the highly accurate SCR-584 radar unit to track a AN/APW-1 radar transceiver equipped JB-2. A SCR-584 tracked the missile's transceiver and sent control signals to correct the missile's course. With the new guidance system the JB-2 became a much more advanced missile than the V-1.

At one point proponents envisioned 75,000 JB-2s planned for production. This was absurd as it would have competed with the established manned bomber forces for sealift from America to Europe. It was estimated that the presumed launch rate of JB-2s would consume 25% of available shipping. Commander of Strategic Air Forces in Europe, Spaatz proposed a much more limited role as a harassment weapon on days where weather limited bombers. Moreover the air forces only wanted the JB-2 if it caused no curtailment of the supply of bombs, artillery shells, and personnel being shipped to Europe. A USAAF launching squadron was formed in anticipation for using the weapons both against Nazi Germany and Japan. The motive for this rush to deploy the JB-2 was the struggle for control of guided missiles between the Army Air Force and the Army Ground Forces. This was the opening round of a struggle between the Army and Air Force over the guided missile which would last until the late 1950s. The end of the European War in May 1945 meant a reduction of the number of JB-2s to be produced, but not the end of the program. Army commanders in Europe had dismissed it as a weapon against Nazi Germany, as the strategic bombing concept was implemented and by 1945 the number of strategic targets in Germany was becoming limited. The JB-2 was envisioned as a weapon to attack Japan. A 180-day massive bombardment of the Japanese Home Islands was being planned prior to the amphibious landing "by the most powerful and sustained pre-invasion bombardment of the war". Included in the assault were the usual naval bombardment and air strikes augmented by rocket-firing aircraft and JB-2s. Deployment of the JB-2 from the ground would require their deployment after landings had been accomplished. Deployment from B-29s would take too long to modify the B-29s necessary. A navalized version, designated KGW-1, was planned to be used against Japan from LSTs (Landing Ship, Tank) as well as escort carriers (CVEs). In addition, launches from PB4Y-2 Privateers were foreseen and techniques developed. As WWII ended in Europe the Army Air Forces had JB-2 crews on transports headed for use against Japan. The war's end led to the cancellation of Operation Downfall and the production of JB-2s was terminated on 15 September. A total of 1,391 were manufactured.

== Postwar testing ==
Though production was halted in mid-September 1945 testing was continued with JB-2s already constructed. Planning for the post war development of Guided Missiles at Eglin had begun prior to VJ Day. On August 13, 1945 a stretch of Santa Rosa Island was purchased by the USAAF for the launch of guided missiles. The replacement launch site was located 22 miles further west on Santa Rosa island from Range 64. Following the war the 1st Experimental Guided Missiles Group was created in January 1946 to replace the ad hoc units which had been at Range 64.

The Eglin JB-2 launch sites were located in Area A-10 of Eglin AFB. The Area-10 JB-2 launch sites on Santa Rosa Island are now designated as archeological sites 8OK246 (30°23’57”N 086°42’19”W) and 8OK248 (30°23’54”N 086°41’33”W) which was about 0.5 miles (800 m) away from 8OK246. Launches from the Boeing B-17G, Boeing B-29, and B-36 Peacemaker bombers were eventually pursued from Hurlburt Field.

JB-2 testing at the Eglin Air Corps Proving Ground site on Santa Rosa Island did not begin until March 1947 over a year after launches at Range 64 ended. The delay between the activation of the 1st Experimental Guided Missiles Group at Eglin and the first launch at the new facility was caused by staffing requirements, the logistics chain and construction delays. During the war things could be done in a hurry. After the war hurry up became wait. While the unit waited for the opening of the facilities on Santa Rosa Island to be constructed the First Experimental Guided Missile Group was conducting cold weather testing at Ladd Field, Alaska, in Project Frigid. At Ladd they successfully launched JB-2s off a 30 feet (9.1 m) long wooden ramp JB-2 testing at Eglin the Santa Rosa Island Range Complex, Area A-10 began in March 1947. The first launcher to be used was 8OK248. The first launch was from a 50 feet (15 m) mobile ramp quite different from the fixed long J ramps used by the Germans. 8OK248, was a mobile launcher site which emphasizes how quickly US practice had diverged from German practice in the development of the JB-2. The launch site was designated L-1. The other launcher, 8OK246, was a fixed launcher with a track 400 feet (120 m) long. Competitive testing of 179 ramp launched and 107 air launched JB-2s using both the pre-set mechanical system vs the radio/radar control system was the first major effort at Eglin. The JB-2 was essentially the only operational guided missile in the US inventory and as such was used for much experimentation. Later tests included determining how long it took an experienced crew to prepare and launch a missile. Up to 30 missiles were launched by a single crew in a day. Tests with the JB-2 at Eglin continued until the summer of 1950 when the Korean War changed the priorities of the USAF and US Navy. The JB-2 was designated the LTV-1 in late 1947, then LTV-A-1 (from "Launch test vehicle, Air Force 1") and LTV-N-2 by the Navy in 1948.

In 1947 the USAF decided to move JB-2 testing to Alamogordo Air Force Base, New Mexico using the test range at White Sands.

The U.S. Navy's version, the KGW-1 was intended for installation on surface ships and shore installations. In 1946 it was re-designated KUW as a test vehicle, then renamed LTV-N-2. The first launch of a LTV-N-2 was from Point Mugu, California on January 7, 1946. The initial land based launch facilities at Point Mugu closely resembled those at area A-10 at Eglin AAF. Later the facilities at Point Mugu were expanded to include the XM1 launch ramp and the Rolling Ramp which designed to provide rolling movements to simulate launching from a ship. As KUW/LTV-N-2 and given the name of an aquatic bird the "Loon" it was developed to be carried on the aft deck of submarines in watertight containers. The submarine to carry the LTV-N-2 was USS Cusk (SS-348) which successfully launched its first Loon on 12 February 1947, off Point Mugu, CA. The submarine USS Carbonero (SS-337) was modified to provide mid-course guidance for Loon. The Carbonero also carried a missile launcher. The LTV-N-2 was equipped with an AN/ANP-33 radar transponder. Shore based launches were tracked and controlled from aeither a SP-1W, SCR-584 or SV-4 radar. Submarine and ship radars were SV-1 type. Telemetry was supplied by either a AN/AKT-1A or AN/AKT-10. LTV-N-2 flights were terminated either by a "dump" command sent to the missile or by one sent from the air log propeller. The Navy program lasted until the last launch of a LTV-N-2 on September 11, 1953. The LTV-N-2 program developed a number of launchers and varied launching techniques, variations in guidance, command guidance computers, the TROUNCE guidance system for SSM-N-8 Regulus, telemetry systems, flight termination, and tested a J30 turbojet as a power plant. The operational reliability of the LTV-N-2 was calculated to be 61.8% but in practice turned out to be only 55.9% The Navy concluded that the reliability of the Loon could not be significantly altered as "improved techniques have just kept pace with component deterioration." The missiles all were manufactured in 1945-46 and were getting old.

After the United States Air Force became a fully independent arm of the National Military Establishment 18 September 1947, research continued with the development of unmanned aircraft and pilotless bombers, including the already available JB-2.

The USAF Air Materiel Command reactivated the JB-2 as Project EO-727-12 on 23 April 1948, at Holloman Air Force Base, New Mexico. The JB-2 was used for development of missile guidance control and seeker systems, testing of telemetering and optical tracking facilities, and as a target for new surface-to-air and air-to-air missiles (fulfilling the V1's cover name, Flakzielgerät — anti-aircraft target device). The JB-2 project used the North American Aviation NATIV (North American Test Instrument Vehicle) Blockhouse and two launch ramps at Holloman: a 400 ft (120 m), two-rail ramp on a 3° earth-filled slope, and a 40 ft (12 m) trailer ramp. The trailer ramp was the first step toward a system which would eventually be adapted for the forthcoming Martin MGM-1 Matador, the first operational surface-to-surface cruise missile built by the United States. The program at Holloman was terminated on 10 January 1949 after successful development of a radio guidance and control system that could control and even skid-land a JB-2 under the control of an airborne or ground transmitter.

The 1st Experimental Guided Missile Group used JB-2s in a series of tests in the late 1940s at Eglin Air Corps Proving Ground Eglin Air Force Base, Florida. In early 1949, the 3200th Proof Test Group tested launching JB-2s from the under the wings of B-36 Peacemaker bombers at Eglin AFB. About a year later, JB-2s were tested as aerial targets for experimental infrared gunsights at Eglin.

The Navy version of the Loon was featured in the movie The Flying Missile (1951), including submarine launches. The movie, starring Glen Ford, is a highly fictionalized account of the early development of submarine launched guided missiles. The movie shows the missile being launched from a trolley with four JATO bottles.

In the mid-1992, military crews uncovered the well-preserved wreckage of a JB-2 at a site on an Air Force-owned section of Santa Rosa Island. Most crash sites on the barrier island were little more than flaky rust, but after the find, officials were planning further searches.

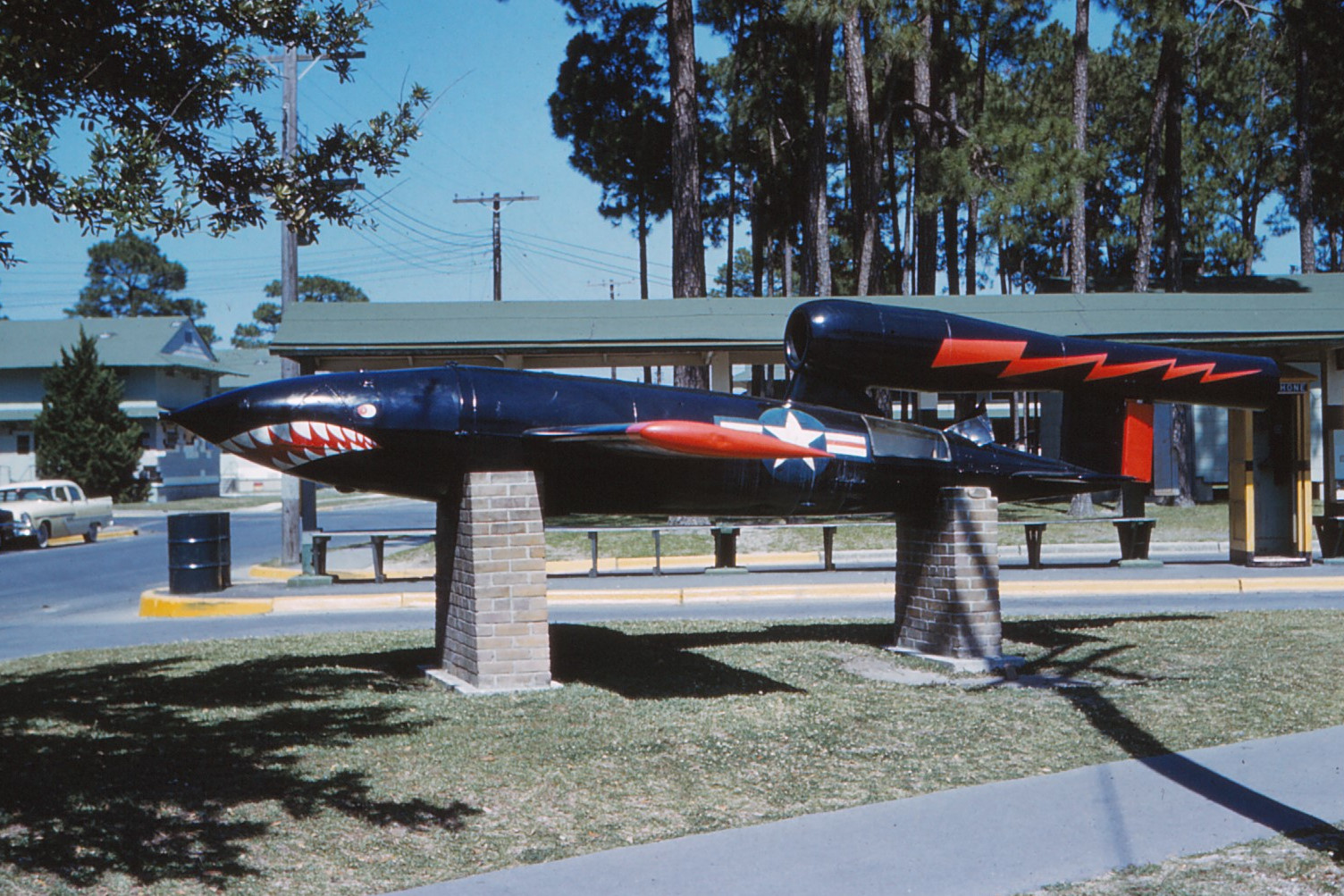
Republic-Ford JB-2 at Keesler Air Force Base, Biloxi, Mississippi. May, 1961

== Surviving missiles ==
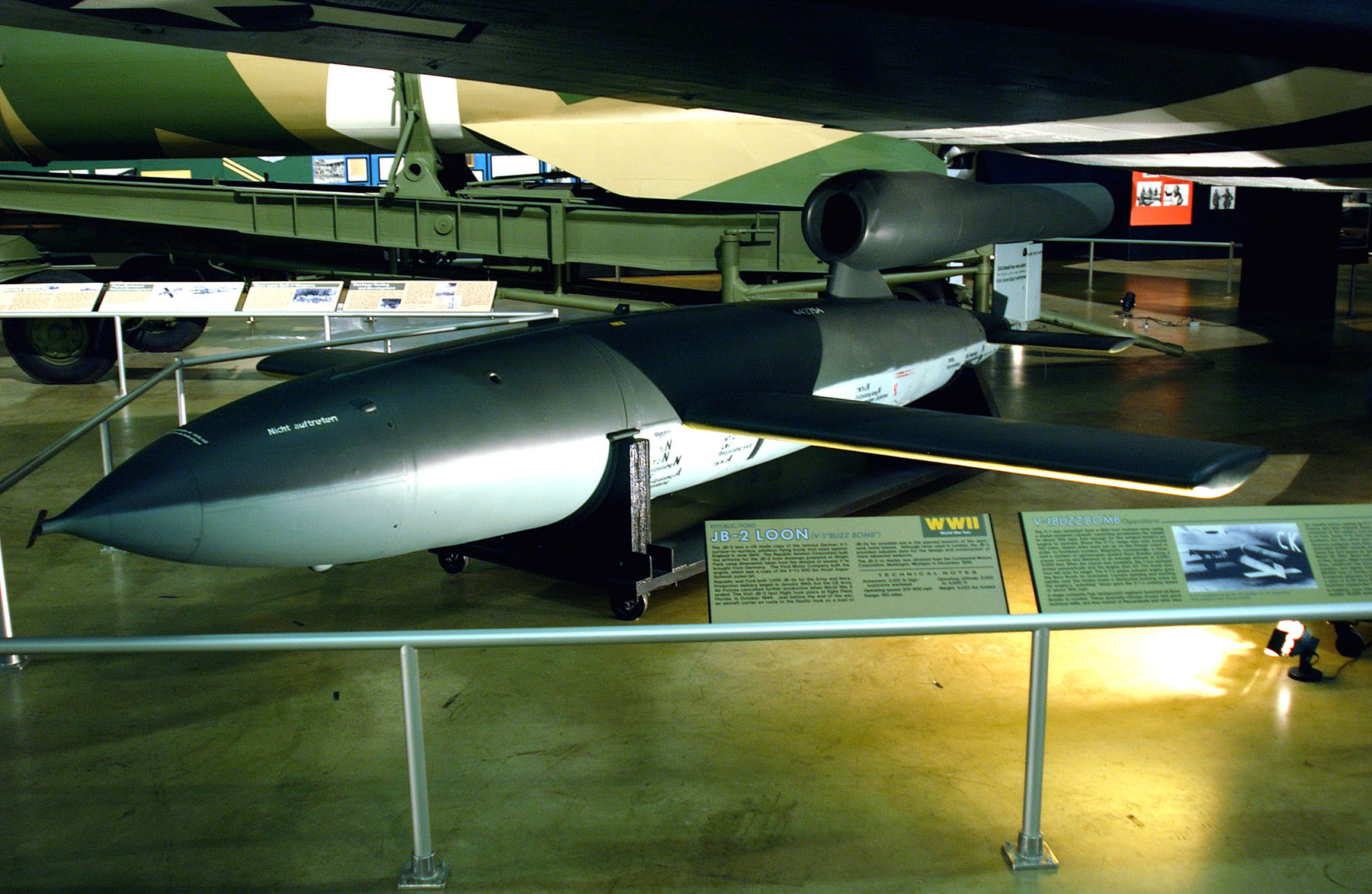
JB-2 on display at the National Museum of the United States Air Force, 2006. It has been painted to resemble a German V-1

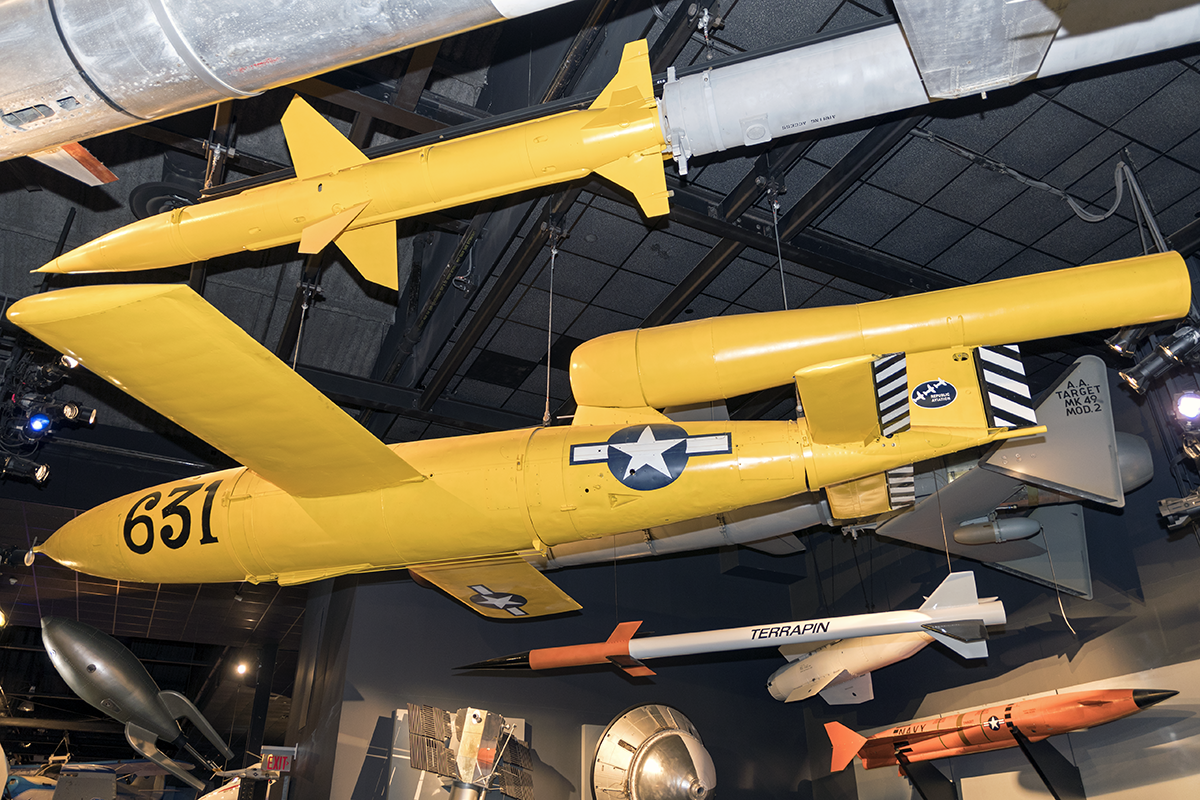
JB-2 on display at the Cradle of Aviation Museum, 2017

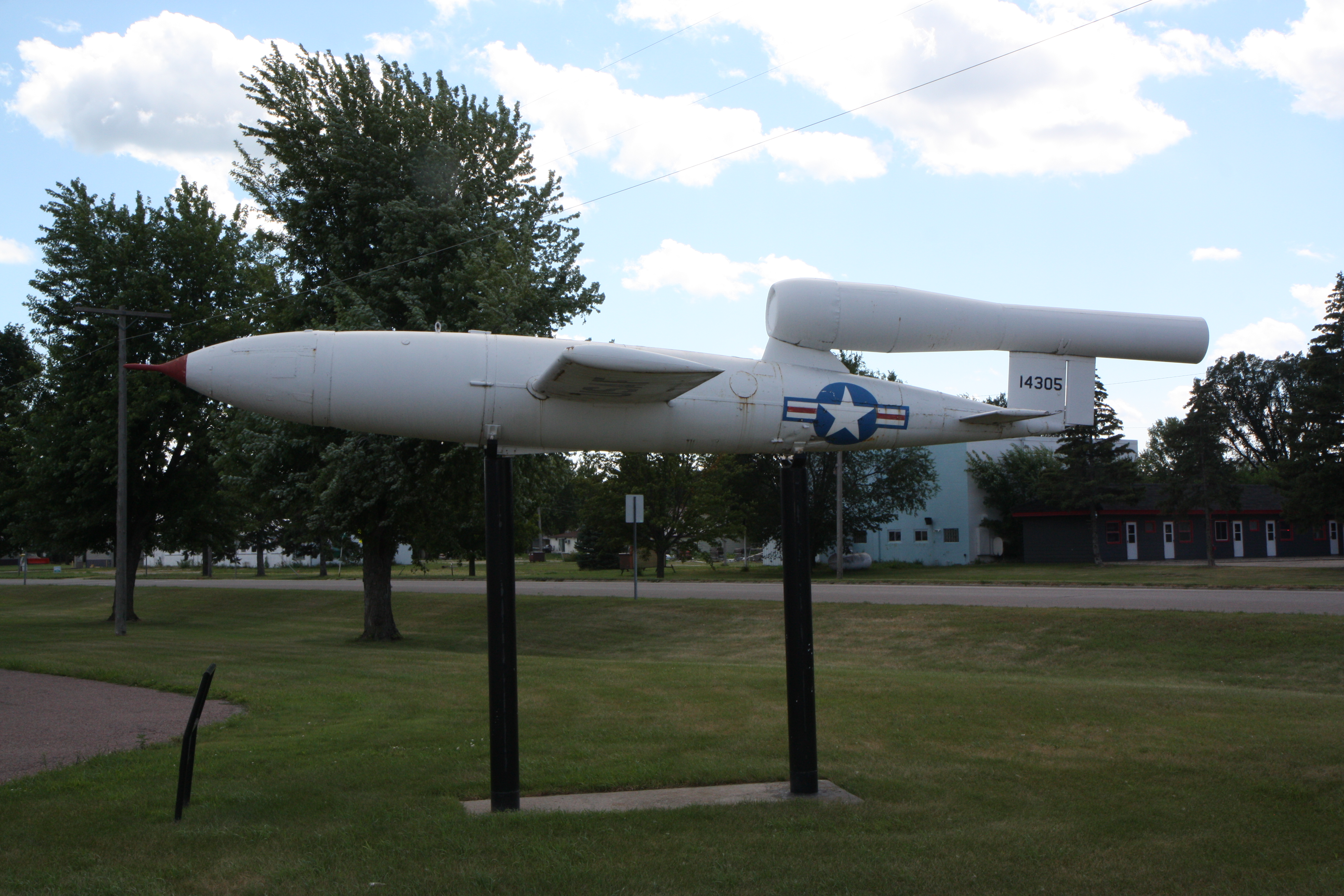
JB-2 Loon, Wheaton, Minnesota, 2015

- A JB-2 is on display at the National Museum of the United States Air Force in Dayton, Ohio.
- A JB-2 is on display at the Steven F. Udvar-Hazy Center of the National Air and Space Museum in Chantilly, Virginia.
- A JB-2 is on display at the Cradle of Aviation Museum in Garden City, New York.
- A JB-2 is on display at the Evergreen Aviation & Space Museum in McMinnville, Oregon.
- A JB-2 is on display at the American Heritage Museum in Stow, Massachusetts. It is painted to resemble a V-1.
- A JB-2 is on display at the Hill Aerospace Museum in Roy, Utah.
- A JB-2 is on display at the White Sands Missile Range Museum near Las Cruces, New Mexico.
- A JB-2 is in storage at the New England Air Museum in Windsor Locks, Connecticut.
- A composite V-1/JB-2 is on display at the Cosmosphere in Hutchinson, Kansas. The missile is painted as a V-1, but is a composite of V-1 and JB-2 parts and has a JB-2 Loon-style forward engine support fairing.
- A JB-2 is on display at the Air Force Museum of New Zealand in Christchurch, New Zealand. It was previously on display at the Museum of Transport & Technology.
- A JB-2 is on display at the Air Force Armament Museum at Eglin Air Force Base near Valparaiso, Florida.
- A JB-2 is on display at the Museum of Alaska Transportation and Industry in Wasilla, Alaska.
- A JB-2 is on display at the Point Mugu Missile Park at Naval Air Station Point Mugu near Port Hueneme, California.
- A JB-2 is on display at the U.S. Army Artillery Museum at Fort Sill, Oklahoma.
- A JB-2 is on display at the Rocket Park at the United States Space & Rocket Center.
- A JB-2 is on display at the American Legion post in Wheaton, Minnesota.
- A JB-2 is on display at Milford Township Park at Milford, Illinois.
- A JB-2 is in storage at the New Mexico Museum of Space History

== See also ==
Related development

- V-1 (flying bomb)

Aircraft of comparable role, configuration, and era

- Interstate XBDR
- McDonnell LBD Gargoyle
- 10Kh
- 1st Experimental Guided Missiles Group

Launch locations

- Wendover Air Force Base, Utah JB-2 Testing Site (40°41′52″N 114°02′29″W)
- Holloman Air Force Base, New Mexico JB-2 Testing Site (32°53′33″N 106°07′24″W)
- Range 64, Santa Rosa Island, JB-2 Launch Site 30°12′9″N 085°50′59″W (30°23′54″N 086°41′33″W)
- Santa Rosa Island Range Complex, JB-2 Launch Sites 30°23′57″N 086°42′21″W (30°23′54″N 086°41′33″W)
- Wagner Field, Florida (Formerly: Eglin Air Force Auxiliary Field #1) (30°39′46″N 086°20′41″W)
