= 1st Experimental Guided Missiles Group =

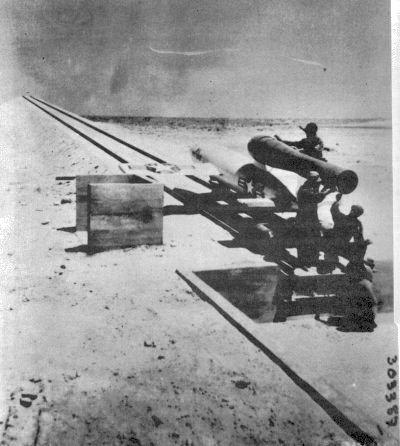
- Postwar testing of the Republic-Ford JB-2 at Holloman Air Force Base, New Mexico
- Active: 1946–1949
- Country: United States
- Branch: United States Air Force

The 1st Experimental Guided Missiles Group is an inactive United States Air Force unit. It was last assigned to the Air Proving Ground Command and stationed at Eglin Air Force Base, Florida. It was inactivated on 22 July 1949.

The 1st EGMG was the initial United States Army Air Forces (later United States Air Force) dedicated missile unit.

== History ==
Formed a result of the Air Materiel Command's Engineering Division at Wright-Patterson Air Force Base looking for a location to allow its contractors to launch missiles.

=== Missile technologies ===
Initial mission of unit was to determine Air Force missile requirements and review missile propulsion, guidance, and launching technologies. Also matrixed contractors to technologies:

- The Glenn L. Martin Company became the primary contractor in short-range, surface-to-surface missiles (e.g., the MX-771 Matador)
- Boeing got the surface-to-air business with the MX-606 Bomarc interceptor
- General Dynamics (i.e., the Consolidated-Vultee Aircraft Corporation) had the XB-65 Atlas, and North American had the MX-770 Navaho. Both of those were long-range, surface-to-surface missiles, though the Navaho was air breathing and the Atlas was ballistic.
- Northrop had the MX-775A Snark, another long-range, surface-to-surface, air-breathing missile
- Hughes Aircraft was contracted for air-to-air missiles
- Bell Aircraft was contracted for air-to-surface missiles

The contractor would be responsible for the requirements, and ultimately responsible for seeing that the project planning and development came together. In the late 1940s, the available funding that was provided to the Air Force was directed towards jet aircraft development. Missiles, at the time, were a piecemeal effort which reflected much competition among the three military branches and development often took a backseat to Strategic Air Command bomber and tanker force improvements.

=== Program plan development ===
In March 1947, when the group received its first series of test projects. Though most of the group's efforts were devoted to "on-the-job" training and providing assistance to contractors who launched those weapons, the 1st began implementing its mission, which included

- Developing tactics and techniques for guided missile operations
- Training personnel and testing equipment used in guided missile organizations
- Developing requirements and standards for the employment of guided missiles
- Conducting functional and tactical tests of new guided missiles to determine their operational suitability (i.e., readiness for adoption by the armed forces).

=== Operations ===
==== B-17 Drone development ====
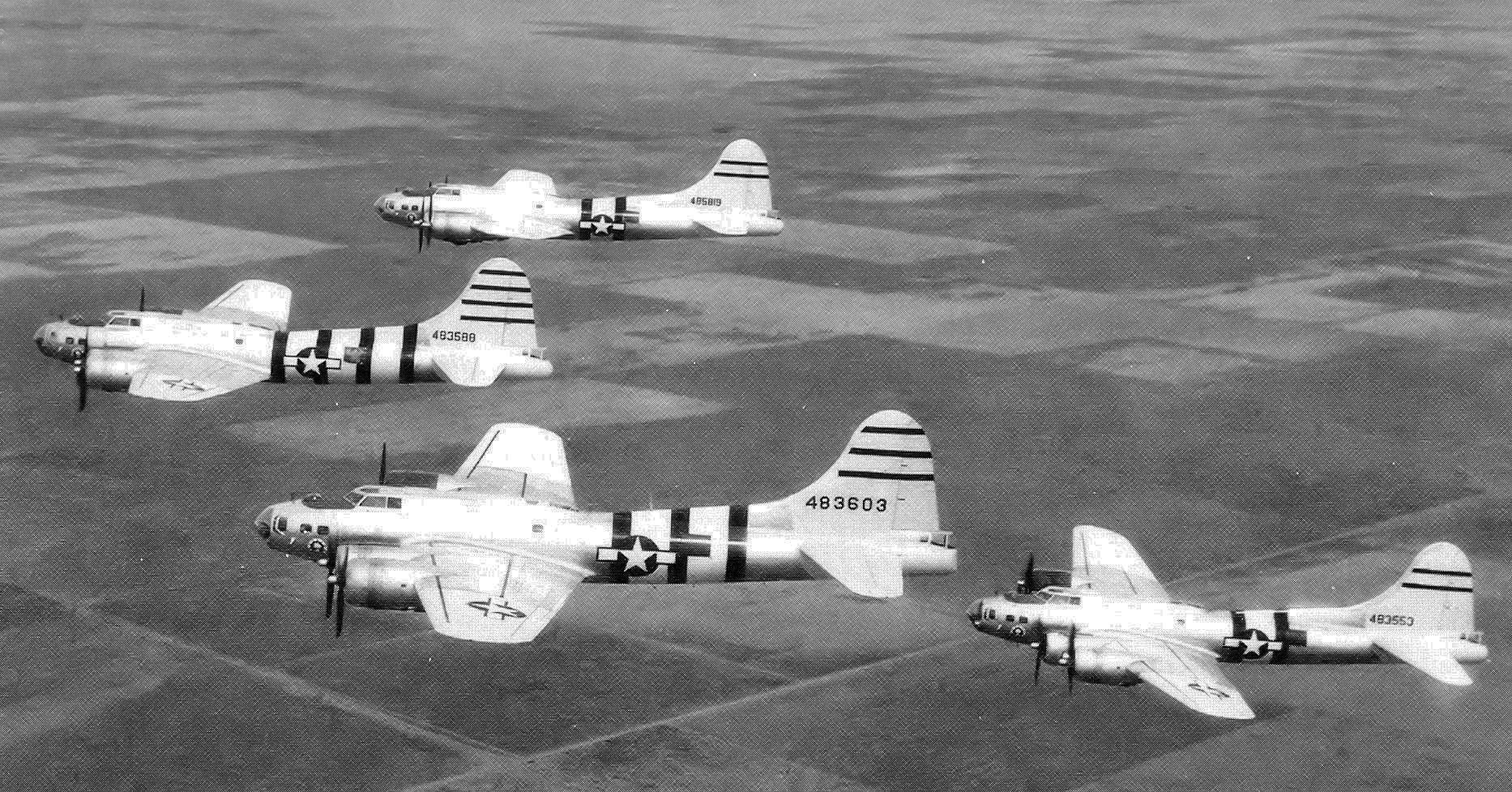
BQ-17 Flying Fortress Drones over New Mexico, April 1946. Aircraft were in natural aluminum finish with red fuselage and tail stripes. Photo taken from accompanying DB-17G drone controller aircraft. Drone aircraft identified as: 44-83553, 44-83603, 44-83588, 44-85819

During the war, experiments were made with approximately twenty-five war-weary B-17s (mostly F models) that were packed with high explosives to be used against heavily fortified Nazi weapons sites in France. These aircraft, designated "BQ-7" experiments (Project Aphrodite and Project Castor) were not successful due to the inability of the aircraft to be launched and controlled remotely, and the need for the aircraft to have a flight crew that would bail out and control of the plane be transferred to a director aircraft which would direct it to the target. Control difficulties in the wartime conditions led to the cancellation of the program.

Development in the United States of the wartime technology was accelerated by the 1946 Operation Crossroads atomic tests. The testing program called for drone aircraft to be flown through the atomic clouds after the explosion with monitoring and air sampling equipment. The requirement was for the drone aircraft to be taken off, flown and landed by radio control. The Air Materiel Command at Wright-Patterson Field, Ohio, developed a refined remote control system in about six weeks, advancing the World War II technology to meet the requirements. Initial testing was performed at Clovis Army Air Field, New Mexico. On 16 February 1946, the technology was successfully demonstrated using a war-weary B-17 that was flown in all phases of the flight remotely by radio control from a "mother" aircraft.

In May 1946, sixteen new B-17s were drawn from storage at South Plains Army Air Field, Lubbock, Texas. and were flown to the San Antonio Air Depot, Kelly Field, Texas. All defensive armament and turrets were stripped; the bomb bay doors being sealed along with the waist gunner openings. Then, the aircraft equipped with radio, radar, television and other equipment. Six of the aircraft were fitted with drone director equipment to control one drone aircraft and the capability to back up one other director aircraft.

The aircraft were tested at Clovis, then attached to the 509th Composite Group at Roswell Army Air Field, New Mexico. and were set to deploy to the Marshall Islands for use in Operation Crossroads. Their mission was atmospheric sampling collection and atmospheric research, to fly through the mushroom cloud and take measurements. In June 1946, both the Director and Drone B-17s were flown to Eniwetok Airfield, Eniwetok Atoll in the Marshall Islands, some 200 miles west of Bikini Atoll where the Crossroads tests were to take place. On 1 July 1946 Test Able took place and the aircraft were flown through the mushroom cloud for sample collections successfully. An extensive post-test inspection was conducted on the aircraft and all was found to be well. Test Baker took place two weeks later and again inspections were conducted. The aircraft returned to Roswell in August.

The success of the drone B-17s led to the development of other types of sampling methods and establishment of other squadrons for a wide variety of programs. In September 1947, the B-17Gs were re-designated as QB-17 for drones and the DB-17 for the controller aircraft.

With the completion of the Operation Crossroads tests, management of the B-17 drone program was transferred to the Army Air Forces Proving Ground Command from Material Command. The 1st EGMG was given the mission to oversee development of drone aircraft to support the Atomic Energy Commission nuclear tests. On 13 January 1947, the Guided Missiles Group received nationwide publicity by conducting a successful drone flight from Eglin AFB to Washington, D.C., in a simulated bombing mission. In April 1948, the Group deployed the QB/DB Fortresses to Eniwetok Atoll for the Operation Sandstone nuclear tests in the spring of 1948.

At Holloman Air Force Base, the Group established a detachment to support the 2754th Experimental Wing, and testing for the ASM-A-2 RASCAL missile. QB-17 Fortress drones were used as aerial weapons targets for the missile. The drone Fortresses were also used as weapons targets for the testing and development of the AIM-4 Falcon air-to-air missile.

==== JB-2 missile testing ====
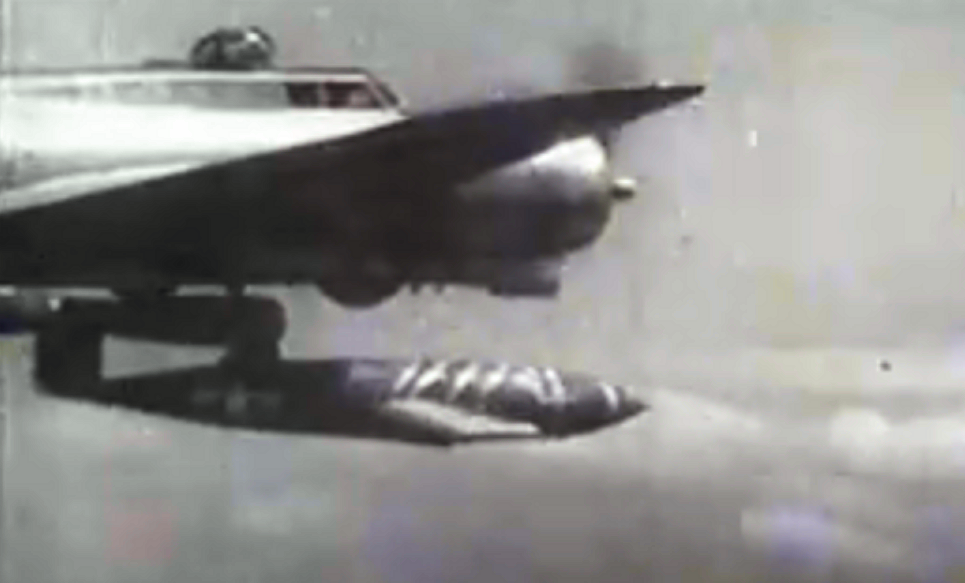
JB-2 being air launched for flight test by B-17 bomber during testing of weapon at Eglin Field

The 1st regrouped its activities after Operation Sandstone, and it spent several months preparing a detachment to depart for cold weather testing of the JB-2 flying bomb in Alaska in November 1948. The Republic-Ford JB-2 was a United States copy of the World War II German V-1 flying bomb. Developed in 1944, it was extensively tested at Eglin Field. It was planned to be used in the United States invasion of Japan (Operation Downfall), however, with the sudden end of the war, the JB-2 was never used in combat. It was the forerunner of the family of United States Guided Missiles.

Testing by the 1st EGMG of the JB-2 was performed with two versions — the wartime version with preset internal guidance and another version fitted with radar control Testing began at Alamogordo Army Airfield, New Mexico in March 1947 and it spent several months preparing a detachment to depart for cold weather testing of the JB-2 in Alaska in November 1948. Additional testing was also done at the Santa Rosa Island Range Complex, Florida, and at Wagner Field (Eglin Auxiliary Field #1) from with MB-17Gs were fitted with the JB-2 for airborne launches.

The JB-2 was used for development of missile guidance control and seeker systems, testing of telemetering and optical tracking facilities, and as a target for new surface-to-air and air-to-air missiles (ironically fulfilling the former V1's covername, Flakzielgerät — anti-aircraft target device). The JB-2 project used the North American Aviation NATIV (North American Test Instrument Vehicle) Blockhouse and two launch ramps at Holloman: a 400 ft (120 m), two-rail ramp on a 3° earth-filled slope, and a 40 ft (12 m) trailer ramp. The 40-foot trailer ramp was the first step toward a system that would eventually be adapted for the forthcoming Martin MGM-1 Matador, first operational surface-to-surface cruise missile built by the United States. The program at Holloman was terminated on 10 January 1949 after successful development of a radio guidance and control system that could control and even skid-land a JB-2 under the control of an airborne or ground transmitter.

The Group also began providing observers for guided missile tests at laboratories and factories, including those programs sponsored by the Army and Navy. The JB-2 was never used operationally, however, it led to the development of the first operational USAF cruise missile, the Martin B-61A Matador.

==== Gliding bomb testing ====
The wartime Henschel Hs 293 was a German radio-controlled glide bomb with a rocket engine slung underneath it. It was used as an anti-ship weapon. After the war, the German technology was used to develop the VB-3 Razon, VB-6 Felix and VB-13 Tarzon gliding bombs. Testing of these weapons began in 1947 by the 1st EGMG at Eglin, using MB-17 Flying Fortresses as launch platforms. During the Korean War, the VB-3 and VB-13 were used operationally against enemy targets in North Korea.

=== Inactivation ===
On 20 July 1949, the 1st Experimental Guided Missiles Group was inactivated and the unit structure was replaced by the 550th Guided Missiles Wing on the same date, which assumed the personnel and equipment of the 1st EGMG.

=== Lineage ===
- Established as 1st Experimental Guided Missiles Group c. 25 January 1946

Activated on 6 February 1946
Inactivated on 20 July 1949

=== Assignments ===
- Army Air Forces Center, 6 February 1946
- Army Air Forces Proving Ground Command (later Air Proving Ground Command, Air Materiel Command Proving Ground, Air Proving Ground), 8 March 1946 – 20 July 1949

=== Units ===
- 1st Experimental Guided Missiles Squadron, 6 February 1946 – 22 July 1949
- 1st Experimental Air Service Squadron, 6 February 1946 – 22 July 1949ref name="Mindling"/>

=== Stations ===
- Eglin Air Force Base, Florida, 6 February 1946 – 20 July 1949

Operated from Duke Field (Eglin Auxiliary Field #3), 6 February 1946 – 1 March 1947

Detachment at: Holloman Air Force Base, New Mexico
Detachment at: Naval Air Station Point Mugu, California

=== Aircraft and Missiles ===
- Republic-Ford JB-2 (1947–1949)

First United States atmospheric guided missile. Tested at Eglin and by Holloman AFB detachment

- B-17 Flying Fortress (1946–1949)

BQ-17 Flying Fortress: Unmanned drone aircraft
DB-17 Flying Fortress: Drone director aircraft
MB-17 Flying Fortress: Airborne missile/gliding bomb launcher
QB-17 Flying Fortress: Unmanned drone aircraft used as aerial weapons targets

- VB-6 Felix (1947–1948)

Air-to-surface guided bomb with a heat-seeking guidance system primarily designed as an anti-ship weapon. Supported by NAS Point Mugu detachment.

- VB-3 Razon (1947–1948)

1,000-pound general-purpose bomb fitted with radio-controlled flight control surfaces

- VB-13 Tarzon (1947–1948)

A British 12,000-pound "Tall Boy" bomb fitted with radio-controlled flight control surfaces.
