= Glenford (name) =

Glenford, a male given name, may refer to one of the following:

- Glenford Baptist, Belizean prisoner, who became Belize's longest serving death row inmate
- Glenford Eckleton Mitchell, member of the Universal House of Justice, the supreme governing body of the Bahá'í Faith
- Glenford Myers, American computer scientist, entrepreneur, and author
- Glenford Spencer, Jamaican criminal and member of the Yardies
- Glen Tetley, born Glenford Andrew Tetley (1926–2007), American ballet and modern dancer

== See also ==
- Glenn Ford
- Glenn Ford (disambiguation)
