= Santa Rosa Island Range Complex =

Santa Rosa Island Range Complex
- Part of Air Force Materiel Command (AFMC)
- Located near: Valparaiso, Florida

Location
- Location within Florida
- Coordinates: 30°23′22″N 086°48′18″W

The Santa Rosa Island Range Complex is a component of the Eglin AFB testing range, located 17.5 miles west-southwest of the main base, on Santa Rosa Island, sitting between the communities of Navarre and Okaloosa Island.

== Overview ==
The complex is part of the Eglin AFB overwater range that provides 86,500 square miles of overwater airspace that is jointly used for a variety of test and evaluation activities and training exercises. Range operations rely on land-based radar and electro-optical time-space-position-information systems to monitor and transfer test data to the Central Control Facility on Eglin AFB. These instrumentation systems, located on Santa Rosa Island and other locations provide coverage for test and evaluation activities in the Gulf of Mexico.

The use of Santa Rosa Island (SRI) is evolving due to changes in threats to national security and the effects of hurricanes over the past decade. The SRI complex is used for Expanded Surf Zone Testing/Training, SABRE Mine Clearing Testing, Beach Obstacle Clearing and Neutralization, Small Boat Obscurant Testing, Expanded OA-HITL Tower Testing, Live Fire, Expanded Special Operations Training, Amphibious Assaults, and Expanded LCAC Training/Testing.

=== Sites ===
Operational sites on SRI include the following locations:

- A-1 * 30°23′21″N 086°31′30″W
- A-2 * 30°23′21″N 086°32′21″W
- A-2 1/2 * 30°23′27″N 086°33′28″W
- A-3 1/2 * 30°23′32″N 086°34′10″W
- A-4 * 30°23′35″N 086°34′40″W
- A-5 * 30°23′44″N 086°35′49″W

ECM Testing/Training location

- A-6 30°23′56″N 086°38′29″W
- A-7 30°23′50″N 086°39′00″W
- A-10 30°24′01″N 086°41′47″W
- A-11 30°23′41″N 086°42′49″W
- A-11A 30°23′59″N 086°42′46″W
- A-12 30°23′54″N 086°44′28″W
- A-13 30°23′34″N 086°44′46″W
- A-13A 30°23′35″N 086°45′31″W
- A-13B 30°23′30″N 086°45′57″W
- A-15 30°23′21″N 086°48′15″W

Surface-to-air missile testing. Tomahawk Sandia, Honest John launch complex.

- A-15A 30°23′22″N 086°47′23″W
- A-17A 30°23′03″N 086°50′21″W
- A-18 30°23′08″N 086°50′51″W

.* Located on non-government controlled property on SRI.

== History ==
=== World War II ===
- World War II JB-2 Launch Site
- U.S. National Register of Historic Places
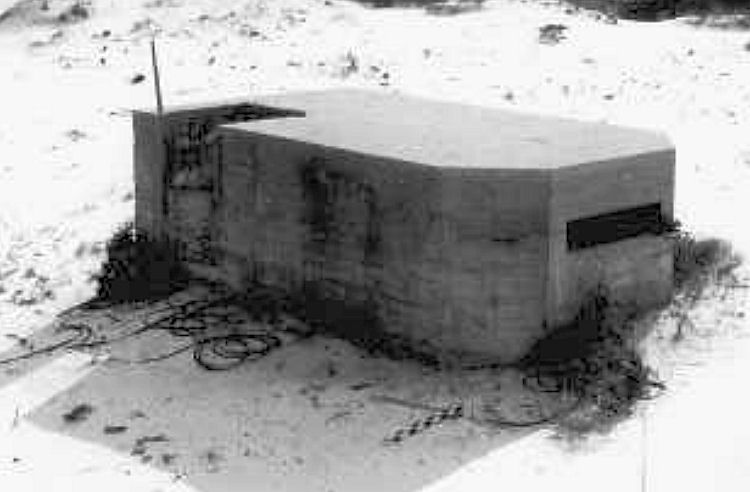
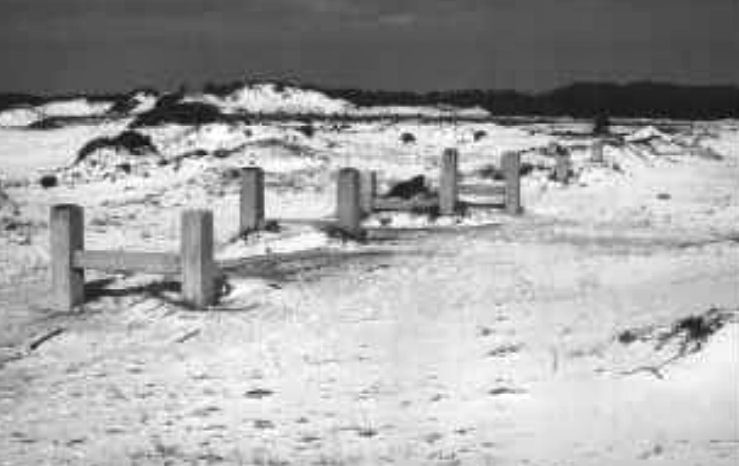
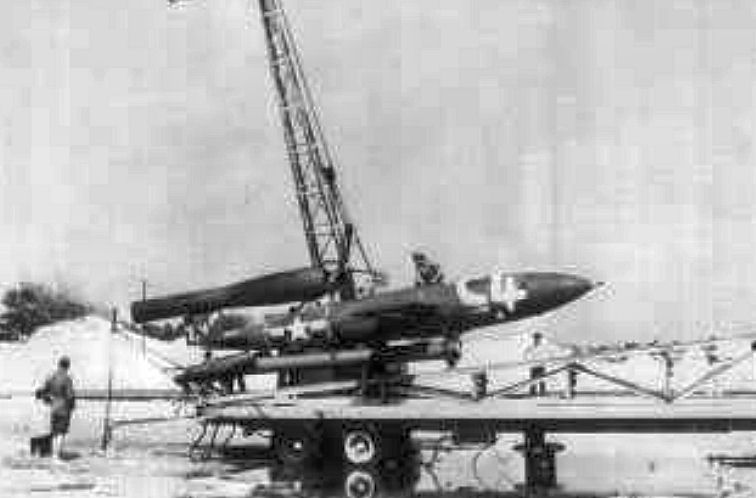
- JB-2 Weapons Bunker at 80K246 Remains of JB-2 launch ramp at 8OK246 JB-2 Loon test at 8OK248, 1945
- Location: Fort Walton Beach, Florida
- NRHP reference No.: 96000395
- Added to NRHP: April 19, 1996

Established during World War II, the complex is a government controlled part of the island. In June 1944, Germany began bombarding England, especially London, with the V-1 flying bomb. In July 1944, parts of a V-1 salvaged by the Polish underground and recovered from crashed but unexploded bombs, were flown to Wright-Patterson Field and within three weeks America had completed its first copy of a V-1, the Republic-Ford JB-2, the United States’ first operational guided missile and the predecessor of the modern cruise missile. Eglin Field was chosen to test launching techniques. Eglin received its first JB-2 for testing in the fall of 1944. Three sites were created on Eglin's Gulf-side property, all designed to test different launching techniques.

Two sites are located within a half mile of each other on Santa Rosa Island, on Air Force property. Recorded as Florida archeological sites 8OK246 and 8OK248, the remnants of these two JB-2 test sites, along with bunkers and debris fields from unsuccessful test flights, were identified as part of Eglin's initial historic property inventory. After identification, these were evaluated for historic significance and subsequently added to the U.S. National Register of Historic Places on April 19, 1996.

- Site 8OK246 (30°23′57″N 086°42′19″W)is the remains of a JB-2 mobile launch site, containing two concrete pads and an observation bunker, all virtually unscathed. Abandoned to the elements, there is a JB-2 wreck south of the ramp. Although the ramp itself is missing, its concrete pillars stand against the passage of time.
- Site 8OK248 (30°23′54″N 086°41′33″W) is the remains of a JB-2 launch ramp (pillars only) and a concrete blockhouse. Most of the facility is covered by sand, it is rumored that there are up to 18 JB-2's buried in the area.

Access to the sites are restricted by the National Park Service and the United States Air Force.

A third launching site, is now located on the Coffeen Nature Preserve, a Sierra Club property east of Destin, Florida, featured a concrete inclined launch ramp. Steam-powered and portable ramps were also tested at this site.

All of the Eglin launchings were directed south to the Gulf of Mexico. The targets were buoys placed at measured distances, up to 150 miles, to which the headings and range of the guidance system were adjusted. There is no evidence that live warheads were used, as many of the wrecks examined by Eglin archeologists have concrete ballast filling the warhead compartment.

With the sudden end of the war, the Army Air Force had 1,300 JB-2s in its arsenal. On January 26, 1946, Army Air Forces created the 1st Experimental Guided Missiles Group to develop and test the missiles at Eglin. The JB-2 testing at Santa Rosa continued until March 1946, when the project was canceled. After cancellation, the reusable portions of the sites were disassembled. However, the debris from crashes was left where it fell, and one or more surplus complete JB-2s are reported to have been buried in the surrounding dunes.

=== Cold War ===
As the Cold War heated up, the highly instrumented Eglin Gulf Test Range was built and supported flight tests of the CIM-10 Bomarc, MGM-1 Matador, ADM-20 Quail, and AGM-28 Hound Dog aerodynamic missiles.

The first BOMARC launch from Santa Rosa Island occurred on 15 January 1959. From 1959 through 1960, the BOMARC A underwent continual testing at site A-15, flying against various drone aircraft. In the early 1960s testing continued with the BOMARC B model. Designated the IM-99B, this missile underwent its inaugural service test on 13 April 13, 1960. On 3 March 1961, an IM-99B demonstrated the ability to intercept a target at a range of over 400 miles at an altitude of over 80,000 feet. The test program for BOMARC A and B concluded in August 1963 after nearly 150 launches. BOMARC B launchings continued into the 1970s as each of the USAF and Canadian Air Defense Missile Squadrons took turns conducting missile shoots.

Both the military and NASA have used SRI to support launch of atmospheric sounding rockets in support of their programs.

== See also ==
- Florida World War II Army Airfields
