= VB-3 Razon =

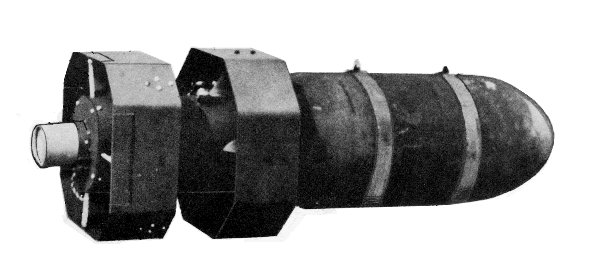
- Type: Guided bomb
- Place of origin: United States

Service history
- In service: 1945–1952
- Used by: United States Air Force

Production history
- Designed: 1942–1945
- No. built: ~3,000

Specifications
- Mass: 1,000 pounds (450 kg)
- Engine: None
- Guidance system: Radio command
- Launch platform: Boeing MB-17 Flying Fortress (tests) Boeing B-29 Superfortress

The VB-3 Razon was a high-angle freefall guided bomb developed by the United States Army Air Force during the 1940s. Razon (from "range and azimuth only") was a standard AN-M65 1,000-pound general-purpose bomb, the same basic ordnance unit used for its Azimuth-Only guided predecessor, the VB-1 Azon guided ordnance, with the Razon concept fitted with flight control surfaces that also enabled adjustment in the vertical plane, like the Luftwaffe's heavier Fritz X armored anti-ship guided ordnance. Development of the Razon began in 1942, but it did not see use during World War II although it was combat ready in the summer of 1945. The VB-4 used a 2,000-pound bomb.

== Development ==
In April 1942, the USAAF's Air Materiel Command [became part of ATSC (Air Technical Service Command) in 1944] began the development of the Azon family (VB-1 half-ton and VB-2 one-ton) guided bombs. Following on the VB-1 Azon bomb (azimuth-only), the Razons used two tandem annular wing assemblies, the aft assembly used for control. "The Razon guidance kit had two octagonal shrouds (similar to the 12-sided annular tail of the Fritz X guided ordnance) in a tandem arrangement. The most problematic part in Razon development was to build a suitably modified bombsight, which would allow the bombardier to correctly judge the bomb's deviation in range so that the range control could be used effectively." The guidance command link used up to 47 preset channels. Around 3,000 Razons were built during 1945. Azon and Razon testing continued through mid-1946 in the Mojave Desert of California.

In 1946, extensive tests were done on Razon by the Air Proving Ground Command, Eglin Field, Florida, "contemplating using the missile aboard all-weather bombers. Nothing materialized, however, until the Korean War when the Far East Air Forces ordered and used the Tarzon, a Tallboy-Razon combination."

In 1948, testing by the 1st Experimental Guided Missiles Group at Eglin still showed Razon to be far more accurate in azimuth than range. "For example, of the eight bombs tested in August 1948, fully three out of four had an azimuth error of zero, while the average range error was almost 200 feet. Only one of the eight scored a direct hit. Still, Razon bombing showed enough promise in early testing that approximately five hundred tail assemblies were produced by Union Switch and Signal Company and stockpiled, allowing their use in the early months of the Korean War."

The VB-5 was a 1000 lb bomb using the same guiding control shroud as the VB-3 and VB-4. Instead of a radio command guidance system, it used an optical contrast based seeker. The VB-5 never went into production.

== Operational use ==
The Razon weapon did not see significant use until the Korean War, where B-29s carrying up to 8 rounds were used to attack bridges in the early months of the war. Several hundred Razons "were dropped on North Korean bridges, and although the overall reliability of the bombs was rather low, some targets were actually destroyed. However, in general multiple hits by the small the 450 kg (1000 lb) bombs were needed to destroy a large bridge span, and the USAF's use of guided bombs for these special missions switched to the much larger VB-13/ASM-A-1 Tarzon." "Despite these difficulties, B-29 bombardiers destroyed 15 bridges with Razon bombs."
