= Northrop JB-1 Bat =

U.S. surface-to-surface cruise missile

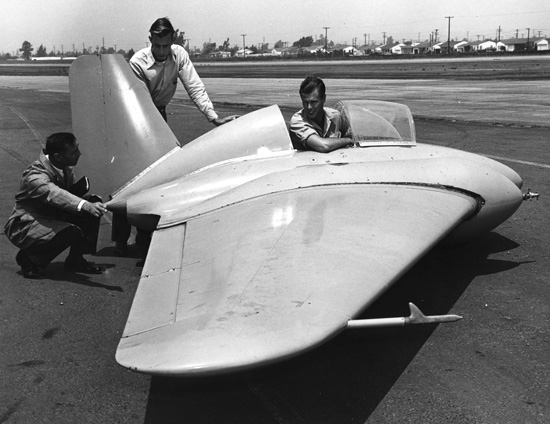
The prototype Bat glider

The Northrop JB-1A "Bat" or "Thunderbug" was a prototype "jet bomb" – in effect, a surface-to-surface cruise missile – developed in the United States during World War II. The JB-1A was also an early jet aircraft, with a radical flying wing planform.

In August 1942, a Fieseler Fi 103, code name Flakzielgerät-43 (FGZ-43) – the piloted prototype of the German V1 flying bomb – crashed on the Danish island of Bornholm. While the island was under German occupation, Danish witnesses were able to forward extensive, detailed descriptions of the Fi 103 to the Allied intelligence services. This led to a US effort in 1943 to develop an equivalent weapon.

Northrop had already been contracted under Project MX-334 for a small rocket propelled flying wing aircraft, and the two projects were combined. The MX-334 first flew, as a glider, on 9 November 1943. Northrop was formally contracted for a jet bomb version, the MX-543, on 1 July 1944, shortly after the Germans began their V-1 campaign against England. The MX-334 flew under rocket power on 5 July.

Progress on the MX-543 was rapid, because much of the design work and plans were picked up directly from work on MX-334. The first JB-1 was built as a manned glider to test the flight characteristics of the vehicle at lower speeds. This was a typical approach by Northrop due to its lack of a wind tunnel. The first flight of the JB-1 glider was piloted by Harry Crosby on 27 August 1944.

A prospective engine, the General Electric B-1, emerged – a result of an unrelated project to convert a B-31 turbosupercharger into a small turbojet. The chief designer was GE testing manager Gene Stoeckly. (Because his parents were foreign nationals, Stoeckly had been prohibited from working on a parallel, secret project to adapt the British Power Jets W.1 engine for American production as the GE 1-A, which was developed into the I-16.) After a potential customer in the form of Northrop expressed a desire for a small turbojet, development was handed off to Russ Hall and Marty Hemsworth who managed to turn the bootstrap project into ostensibly flight worthy hardware.

The JB-1A, equipped with two GE B-1 engines, was ready for testing in early December 1944 at Range 64, Sana Rosa Island, Florida. On 7 December 1944, it was launched and promptly stalled and crashed. The stall was attributed to an improper elevon setting compounded by a failure of one of the GE B-1 turbojets. The Army Air Forces Report on the failure stated "Flight failure was primarily attributted to improper setting of the bombs control surfaces prior to launching, but damage to the right turbo-jet engine approximately 30 seconds before take-off would not have permitted successful flight." The Northrop JB-1 suffered from numerous production and structural complexities as well as being overweight. The problem of persistent turbine failures coupled with the J-1s low thrust had already caused Northrop to seek another powerplant, the Ford pulse jet as used on the JB-2. That change coupled with the need to reduce the cost of manufacturing the JB-1A led to the development of the JB-10.

In June 1996, the Western Museum of Flight restored the manned JB-1 glider.

== JB-10 ==
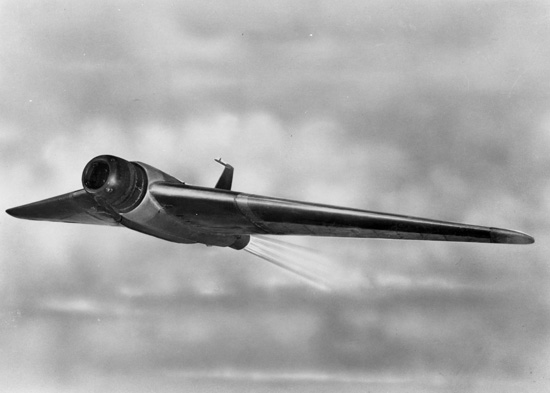
JB-10

With the successful USAAF flights of JB-2, and the inadequate performance of the GE B-1, the JB-1 program was reoriented towards pulsejet propulsion before the attempted first flight of the JB-1A. The remaining JB-1s were modified or completed as JB-10 missiles. The JB-10 was a radical redesign of the vehicle. A single PJ31-1 as was used on the JB-2 replaced the two troublesome B-1s. The explosives were buried in the wing instead of being in nacelles. Only the guidance electronics was left essentially unchanged. A new and much improved telemetry system was added. Testing of the JB-10 began in early 1945 and achieved only two partially successful flights out of 10 attempts. The longest flight of a JB-10 was only 26 miles on 13 April 1945. That short flight was ended by longitudinal instability which was a persistent problem of the JB-10. The JB-10 cost $55,425 each to build while the JB-2 cost $8,620 each. As a competitor to the JB-2 the JB-10 was not a contender. The Northrop program's priority had already been reduced in November 1944. In March 1946 the JB-10 program was terminated.
