= Western Museum of Flight =

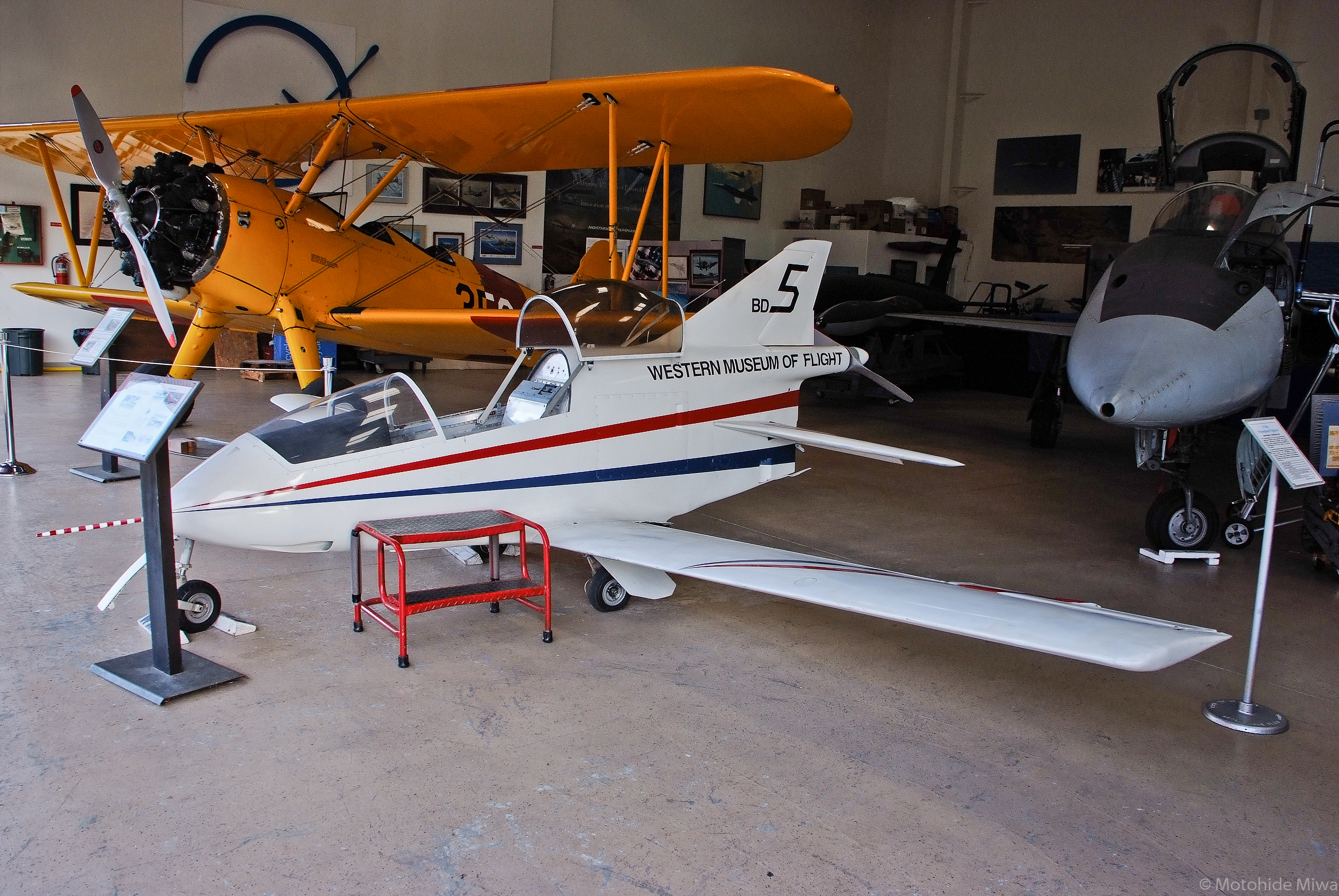
- Bede BD-5 on display at the Western Museum of Flight
- Established: 1985
- Location: 3315 Airport Drive, Red Baron #3; Torrance, California
- Coordinates: 33.8017°N 118.3424°W
- Type: Aviation museum
- Website: www.wmof.com

The Western Museum of Flight (WMOF) is an aviation museum located at Zamperini Field, the municipal airport in Torrance, California. WMOF is operated by the Southern California Historical Aviation Foundation.

== History ==
The museum began in 1985 after the restoration of a Northrop N-3PB Nomad.

In 2006, the museum was threatened with closure due to a potential rent increase.

== Collection ==
The museum has several rare aircraft among its collection, including the second Northrop YF-23 Advanced Tactical Fighter (ATF) 5th generation stealth fighter demonstrator. Also on display is the first Northrop YF-17 Cobra, a lightweight fighter which was the basis for the Boeing (originally McDonnell-Douglas) F/A-18 Hornet currently used by the United States Navy and Marine Corps. In addition, a Grumman F-14 Tomcat and Douglas A-4A, plus numerous other notable jet- and propeller-drive airplanes.

The WMOF is one of two museums that house the only surviving Jack Northrop flying wings (Northrop N-1M at the Steven F. Udvar-Hazy Center annex of the National Air and Space Museum and the Northrop JB-1 Bat glider (crewed) at the WMOF).

It houses not only historic aircraft, many of which were built in Southern California, but also has an extensive collection of historic photographs and blueprints.

== See also ==
- List of aerospace museums
