= Glenford, New York =

- Hamlet
- Location within New York Location within the United States
- Coordinates: 42°00′09″N 74°07′35″W
- Country: United States
- State: New York
- County: Ulster
- Elevation: 659 ft (201 m)
- Time zone: UTC-5 (Eastern (EST))
  - Summer (DST): UTC-4 (EDT)
- ZIP code: 12433
- Area code: 845
- GNIS feature ID: 951213

Glenford is a hamlet in Ulster County, New York, United States. The community is located along New York State Route 28, 8.5 miles (13.7 km) northwest of Kingston. Glenford has a post office with ZIP code 12433, which opened on September 14, 1886.
