= Glenford, Alberta =

Coordinates: 53.80014°N 114.16877°W

Glenford is a locality in Alberta, Canada.

The community derives its name partly from the last name of Thomas Rutherford, an early postmaster, and for a glen near the site.

Hometown of the father of actor Glenn Ford, who chose Glenn as his stage name based on the name of this town.
