= Glenford Spencer =

Glenford "Gee" Spencer (born 1975 in St Catherine) is a Jamaican criminal and member of the Yardies who was listed as one of the top ten most wanted criminals in the country by the Jamaica Constabulary Force.

== Background ==
Spencer fled Jamaica after being charged with the murder of Rohan Lowers and, in 2002, was spotted in Bristol, England.

In 2001, he was listed on a Most Wanted list, at place number five.

== See also ==
- List of fugitives from justice who disappeared
