= ASM-A-1 Tarzon =

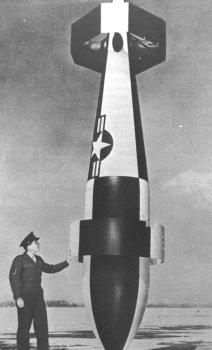
- Type: Guided bomb
- Place of origin: United States

Service history
- In service: 1949–1951
- Used by: United States Air Force

Production history
- Designed: 1945–1948
- Manufacturer: Bell Aircraft

Specifications
- Mass: 13,000 pounds (5,900 kg)
- Length: 21 feet (6.4 m)
- Diameter: 38 inches (970 mm)
- Wingspan: 4 ft 6 in (1.37 m)
- Warhead: Torpex D1
- Warhead weight: 5,200 pounds (2,400 kg)
- Engine: None
- Guidance system: Radio command
- Launch platform: Boeing B-29 Superfortress

The ASM-A-1 Tarzon, also known as VB-13, was a guided bomb developed by the United States Army Air Forces during the late 1940s. Mating the guidance system of the earlier Razon radio-controlled weapon with a British Tallboy 12,000-pound (5,400 kg) bomb, the ASM-A-1 saw brief operational service in the Korean War before being withdrawn from service in 1951.

== Design and development ==
Development of the VB-13 Tarzon began in February 1945, with Bell Aircraft being awarded a contract by the United States Army Air Forces for the development of a very large guided bomb. The VB-13 was a combination of a radio-command guidance system as used on the smaller VB-3 Razon ('Range And azimuth only') guided bomb with the British-developed Tallboy 12,000-pound (5,400 kg) "earthquake" bomb, known to the USAAF as M112. The 'Tarzon' name was a portmanteau, combining Tallboy, range and azimuth only, describing the weapon and guidance system; and was pronounced similarly to that of "Tarzan", the popular "ape-man" fictional character.

The VB-13, redesignated ASM-A-1 in 1948, was developed under the project code MX-674. It had an annular wing around the midsection of its body, mounted near the weapon's center of gravity. At the rear of the bomb was an octagonal tail surface containing the Razon control surfaces. Intended to be carried by the Boeing B-29 Superfortress bomber, (Note: Some sources state that eighteen Convair B-36 Peacemaker heavy bombers were converted to carry two Tarzons each.) the Tarzon bomb used the combination of AN/ARW-38 [Joint Army Navy, Piloted Aircraft, Radio, Automatic Flight or Remote Control] command link transmitter on the B-29 and an AN/URW-2 [Joint Army Navy, Utility, Radio, Automatic Flight or Remote Control] receiver on the Tarzon to provide manual command guidance of range and azimuth. This was done with visual tracking of the bomb's course, aided by a flare mounted in the tail of the weapon. Gyroscopes on board the ASM-A-1 aided in stabilisation, while a pneumatic system drove the bomb's control surfaces. The guidance system was considered effective; Tarzon proved in testing to have an accuracy of 280 feet (85 m).

In addition to the 12,000 pounds (5,400 kg) nominal weight of the Tallboy it was based on, the annular wing and control surfaces boosted the weight of Tarzon by an additional 1,100 pounds (500 kg). This made the ASM-A-1 too large and heavy to fit inside the bomb bay of a Superfortress; instead, the weapon was carried in a semi-recessed mounting, half the weapon being exposed to the airstream. This increased drag on the carrying aircraft, and caused turbulent airflow that could affect the handling of the B-29.

== Operational history ==
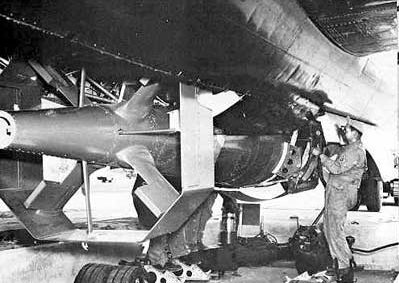
Tarzon being loaded on a B-29 of the 19th Bomb Group

Although the VB-13 project had not reached the testing stage by the end of World War II, it avoided being cancelled, proceeding as a low-priority project. Limited testing was conducted during 1948 and 1949; additional testing at Alamogordo, New Mexico in 1950 led to the Tarzon being approved for operational service in the Korean War.

Tarzon saw its first combat use in December 1950, the ASM-A-1 replacing the Razon in operational service; the smaller weapon had been determined to be too small for effective use against bridges and other hardened targets. Used solely by the 19th Bomb Group, which had previously conducted the Razon's combat missions, the first Tarzon drop in combat took place on December 14, 1950.

The largest bomb used in combat during the war, Tarzon was used in strikes against North Korean bridges and other hardened targets, the Tarzon's improved accuracy over conventional 'dumb bombs' led to the confirmed destruction of at least six high-priority targets during approximately six months of combat use; (Note: Most sources state six targets hit; the National Museum of the United States Air Force, however, gives a total of eleven targets hit, with six bridges destroyed and one damaged.) these included a hydroelectric plant, proving the effectiveness of guided weapons against conventional targets as well as bridges.

Thirty Tarzon missions were flown between December 1950 and March 1951; the weapon's success led to a contract for the production of 1,000 additional ASM-A-1 missiles.

March 3, 1951, a new shipment of Tarzon bombs arrived in the Far East, allowing FEAF to resume raids, suspended since Jan. 17, with the large guided weapons.

On March 29, 1951, however, a Tarzon strike against Sinuiju went awry; the group commander's aircraft was destroyed as a result of the premature detonation of the bomb when, the aircraft suffering mechanical difficulties, the weapon was jettisoned in preparation for ditching. The thirtieth, and as it proved final, mission, three weeks following the Sinuiju mission, also suffered an unintentional detonation of a jettisoned, "safed" bomb, although this time without the loss of the aircraft.

An investigation proved that the fault lay in the construction of the bomb's tail; breaking up on impact, a 'safed' bomb would have its arming wire removed, rendering it 'unsafe' and detonating the weapon. Modifications were made to solve the problem, but the damage had been done; the safety issues, increased maintenance costs compared to conventional bombs, the fact that the bomb's guidance system required clear-day use only, rendering the bombers vulnerable to enemy fighters, and required that the weapon be released at a prime altitude for the aircraft to be in danger from enemy flak. These combined with the weapon's poor reliability – only six of twenty-eight bombs dropped successfully destroyed their targets (Note: While this was unacceptable given the cost of Tarzon, it was ten times better than the results achieved by conventional bombs.) – to result in the production order being canceled by the USAF; following this, the Tarzon program as a whole was terminated in August 1951.

== See also ==
- Azon
- Bat (guided bomb)
- Fritz X
- Grand Slam (bomb)
- Tallboy (bomb)
