= Glenn Ford (disambiguation) =

Glenn Ford (1916–2006) was a Canadian-born American actor.

Glen or Glenn Ford may also refer to:

== Crime-related ==
- Glenn Ford (exoneree) (1945–2015), American exonerated after 30 years on death row, accused of 1983 murder in Louisiana
- Glen R. Ford, police officer involved in investigating the Norfolk Four, who were accused of 1993 rape and murder in Norfolk, Virginia

== Other uses ==
- Glen Ford (journalist) African-American broadcaster and newspaper editor who co-founded the Black Agenda Report
- Glen Ford, Leicestershire, original settlement which is now Glen Parva, England
- Glen Ford (curler) in 2013 Canadian Direct Insurance BC Men's Curling Championship – Qualification

== See also ==
- Glenford (disambiguation)
