= 46th Operations Group =

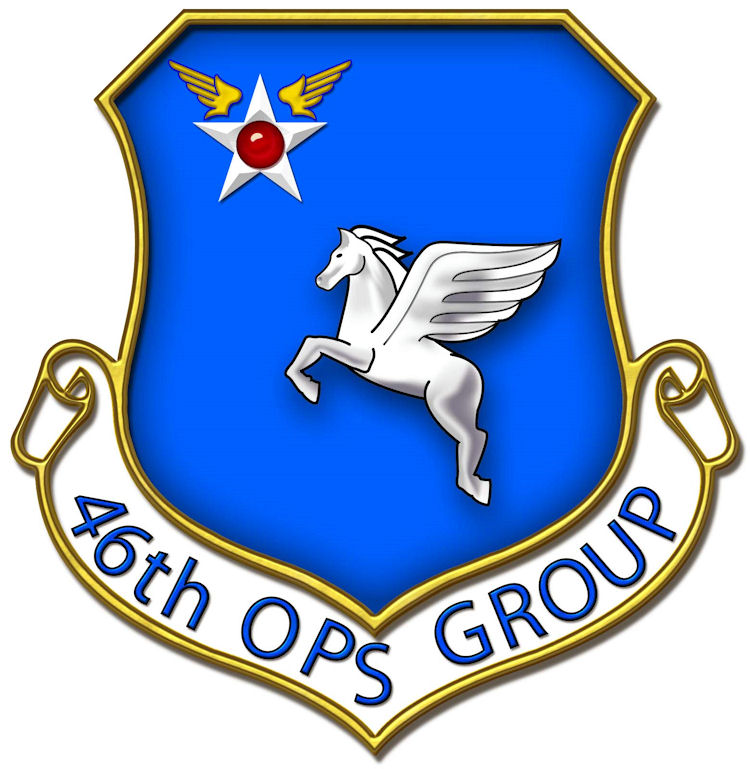
- Emblem of the 46th Operations Group
- Active: 1943–1946; 1993–2012
- Country: United States
- Branch: United States Air Force

Commanders
- Notable commanders: Frank A. Armstrong

The 46th Operations Group was a component of the United States Air Force 46th Test Wing assigned to Eglin Air Force Base, Florida. It was inactivated on 1 October 2012, and its functions transferred to the 96th Test Wing at Eglin Air Force Base, Florida

The 46th was the flying component of the 46th Test Wing. It designed and executed flight and ground test and evaluation of USAF conventional munitions and electronic countermeasures. The 40th Test Squadron flew a mixture of F-15, F-16, NC-130 and A-10 Aircraft.

Its World War II predecessor unit, the 46th Bombardment Operational Training Wing was a command and control organization for replacement training units (RTU) that trained personnel on B-17 Flying Fortress, B-24 Liberator, and B-29 Superfortress bombers. Its group's graduates were then assigned to combat units in overseas theaters worldwide as replacement personnel.

== History ==
=== Lineage ===
- Established as 46 Bombardment Training Wing on 15 February 1943

Activated on 21 February 1943
Redesignated 46 Bombardment Operational Training Wing on 15 April 1943
Inactivated on 9 April 1946
Disestablished on 8 October 1948

- Reestablished, and redesignated 46 Operations Group on 31 August 1993

Activated on 8 September 1993
Inactivated on 1 October 2012

=== Assignments ===
- II Bomber Command, 21 February 1943
- I (later XX) Bomber Command, 15 May 1943
- Second Air Force, 6 October 1943
- Strategic Air Command, 21 March – 9 April 1946
- 46th Test Wing, 8 September 1993 – 1 Oct 2012

=== Components ===
Groups

- 19th Bombardment Group, 4 September 1943 – 1 April 1944
- 302d Bombardment Group, 1 September – 17 December 1943

Squadrons

- 39th Test (later, 39th Flight Test) Squadron: 8 September 1993 – 1 September 1999
- 40th Test (later, 40th Flight Test) Squadron: 8 September 1993 – 1 October 2012
- 337th Flight Test Squadron: 1 July 1994 – 1 September 1997

=== Stations ===
- Dalhart Army Air Field, Texas, 21 February 1943
- Ardmore Army Air Field, Oklahoma, 15 September 1943
- Colorado Springs Army Air Base, Colorado, 21 June 1945 – 9 April 1946
- Eglin Air Force Base, Florida, 8 September 1993 – 1 Oct 2012

=== Aircraft ===
- F-15, 1993–2012
- F-16, 1993–2012
- F/EF-111, 1993–1995
- NC-130, 1993–2012
- A-10, 1994–2012
