= 51st Bombardment Squadron (Light) =

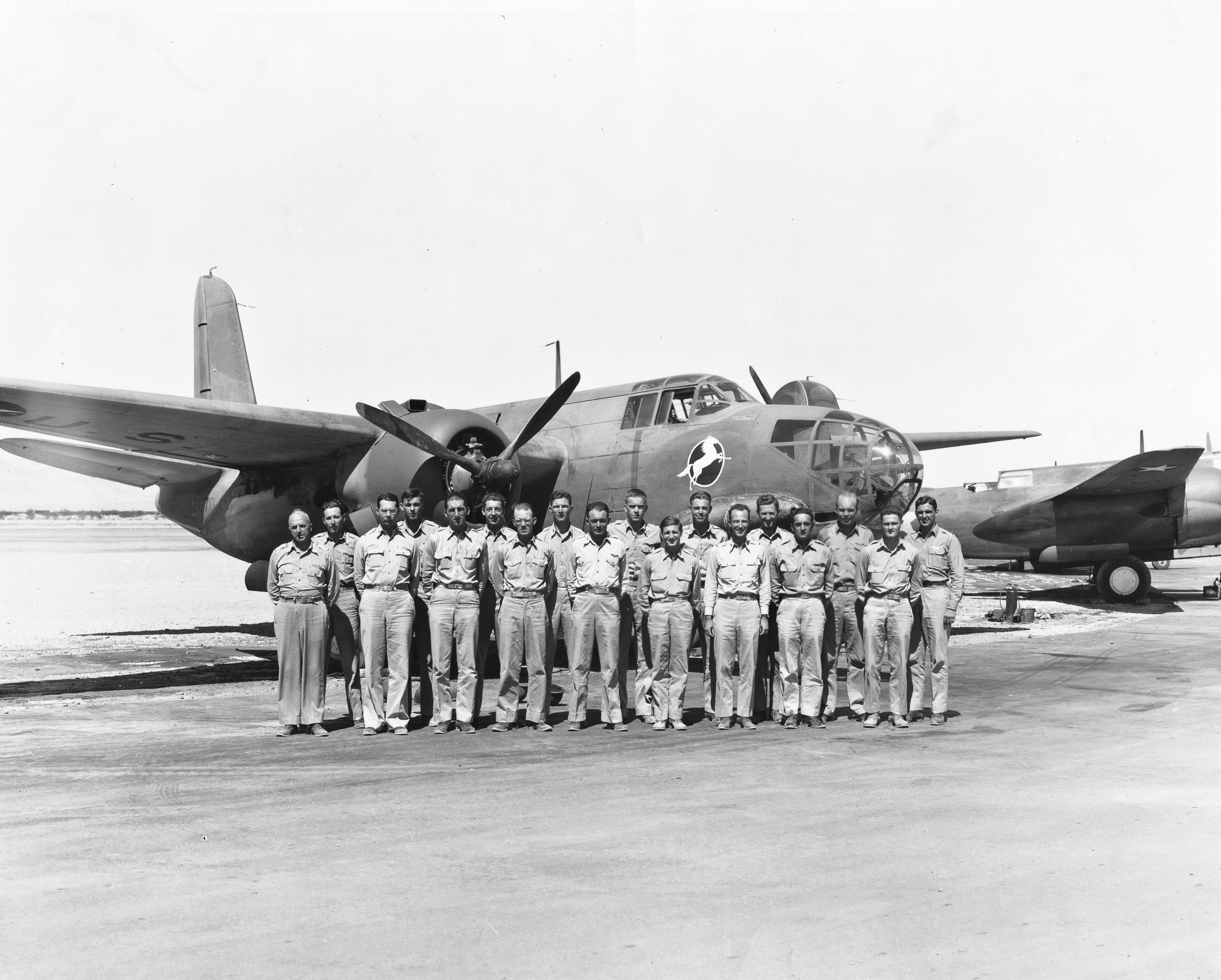
- Douglas A-20 of the 46th Bombardment Group at Blythe Army Air Field
- Active: 1941–1944; 1947–1949; 1949–1951
- Country: United States
- Branch: United States Air Force
- Role: Bombardment
- Engagements: Antisubmarine Campaign

Insignia
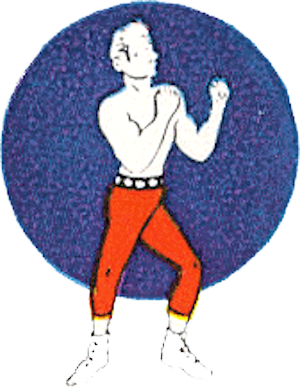
- 51st Bombardment Squadron Emblem (Note: Approved 31 May 1943. Description: In front of a blue disc, a bare-fisted prize fighter, in fighting stance, of the Gay Nineties period, white, outlined black, wearing red tight trunks banded in the middle with a belt of blackk, charged with five stars of white.)

The 51st Bombardment Squadron, Light is an inactive squadron of the United States Air Force last based at Birmingham Municipal Airport, Alabama. The squadron served on antisubmarine patrol early in World War II, then as a training unit until it was disbanded in 1944.

The squadron was reactivated in the Air Force Reserve in 1947. It was called to active service in March 1951 for the Korean War and its personnel used as fillers for other units. The 51st was inactivated on 20 March 1951.

== History ==
=== World War II ===
The squadron was first activated as the 51st Bombardment Squadron (Light) in 1941. It was one of the four original squadrons of the 46th Bombardment Group. The 51st was equipped with Douglas A-20 Havoc aircraft at Hunter Field, Georgia. The 51st participated in maneuvers, After the entry of the United States into the war, the squadron briefly deployed to Army Air Base, Manchester, New Hampshire.but then moved to Barksdale Field, Louisiana, and to Galveston Army Air Field, Texas, from which it flew anti-submarine warfare patrol and search missions over the Gulf of Mexico until May 1942.

It moved to Blythe Army Air Base, California, where it participated in desert maneuvers. It then served as an Operational Training Unit (OTU) at Will Rogers Field, Oklahoma. OTUs were oversized parent units that provided cadres for "satellite groups." In late 1943 the squadron moved to Morris Field, North Carolina and its mission changed to replacement training of individual pilots and aircrews. Just before disbanding, the squadron began to convert to North American B-25 Mitchells.

However, the Army Air Forces found that standard military units, based on relatively inflexible tables of organization were proving less well adapted to the training mission. Accordingly, a more functional system was adopted in which each base was organized into a separate numbered unit. This resulted in the squadron, along with other units at Morris Field, being disbanded and its personnel, equipment and functions transferred to the 333d AAF Base Unit (Replacement Training Unit, Light Bombardment).

=== Air Force reserve ===
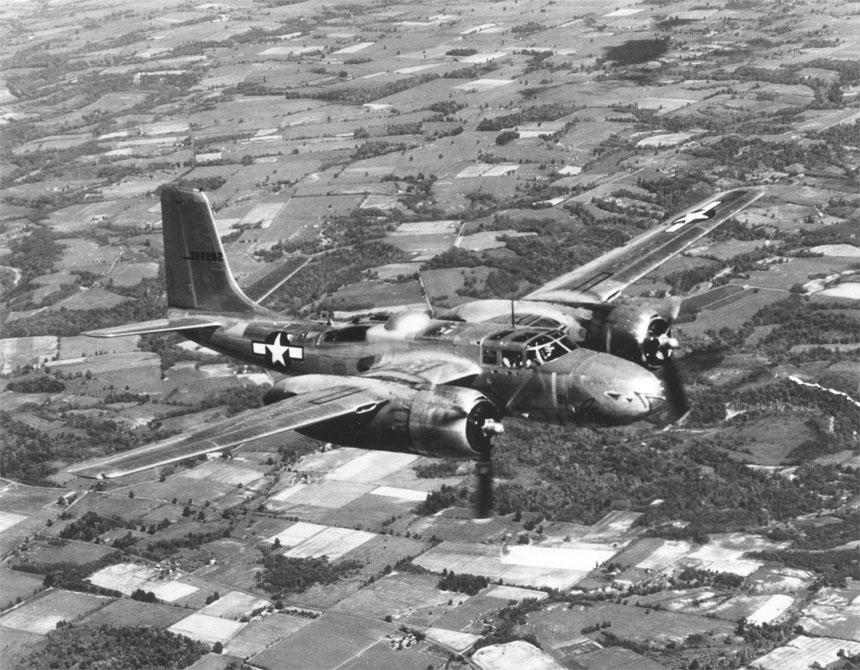
A-26 Invader in flight

The squadron was reconstituted and activated in the reserve under Air Defense Command (ADC) at Mitchel Field, New York in July 1947 and assigned to the 319th Bombardment Group. At Mitchel, the squadron trained under the supervision of the 113th AAF Base Unit (later the 2230 Air Force Reserve Training Center), although it is not clear whether it was fully manned or equipped during this period. In July 1948 Continental Air Command (ConAC) assumed responsibility for managing reserve and Air National Guard units from ADC. The 51st's stay at Mitchel ended when ConAC reorganized its reserve units under the wing base organization system in June 1949.

The squadron moved on paper to Reading Municipal Airport, Pennsylvania, where it replaced elements of the 322d Bombardment Group. At Reading, the squadron trained under the supervision of the 2237th Air Force Reserve Training Center. The squadron was authorized manning of only 25% of normal strength. Runway length at Reading, however, led ConAC to decide to station a troop carrier unit there, and the squadron was inactivated on 2 October 1949 and its personnel were transferred to the 328th Troop Carrier Squadron.

The squadron activated again about a month later, on 10 October 1949, at Birmingham Municipal Airport, Alabama, where it replaced the 337th Troop Carrier Squadron. The squadron flew the Douglas B-26 Invader at Birmingham, where training was conducted by the 2587th Air Force Reserve Training Center. All reserve combat and corollary units were mobilized for the Korean War, and the 51st was called up on 10 March 1951. Its personnel and aircraft were used as fillers for other units, and the squadron was inactivated on 22 March.

== Lineage ==
- Constituted as the 51st Bombardment Squadron (Light) on 20 November 1940

Activated on 15 January 1941
Disbanded on 1 May 1944

- Reconstituted and redesignated 51st Bombardment Squadron, Light on 26 May 1947

Activated in the reserve on 9 July 1947
Inactivated on 2 September 1949
Activated on 10 October 1949
Inactivated on 22 March 1951

=== Assignments ===
- 46th Bombardment Group: 15 January 1941 – 1 May 1944
- 319th Bombardment Group: 9 July 1947 – 2 September 1949
- 319th Bombardment Group: 10 October 1949 – 22 March 1951

=== Stations ===
- Hunter Field, Georgia, 15 January 1941
- Bowman Field, Kentucky, 17 May 1941
- Army Air Base, Manchester, New Hampshire, 12 December 1941
- Bowman Field, Kentucky, 13 January 1942
- Barksdale Field, Louisiana, 2 February 1942
- Galveston Army Air Field, Texas, 31 March 1942
- Blythe Army Air Base, California, 17 May 1942
- Will Rogers Field, Oklahoma, 12 November 1942
- Drew Field, Florida, 8 October 1943
- Morris Field, North Carolina, 6 November 1943 – 1 May 1944
- Mitchel Field, New York, 9 July 1947
- Reading Municipal Airport, Pennsylvania, 27 June 1949 – 2 September 1949
- Birmingham Municipal Airport, Alabama, 10 October 1949 – 22 March 1951

=== Aircraft and Launch Vehicles Operated ===
- Douglas A-20 Havoc, 1941–1944
- North American B-25 Mitchell, 1944
- Douglas B-26 Invader, 1949–1951

=== Campaign ===
Campaign Streamer	Campaign	Dates	Notes
	Antisubmarine	7 December 1941 – 17 May 1942	

== See also ==
- List of Douglas A-20 Havoc operators
