= Frank A. Armstrong =

United States Air Force general (1902–1969)

Frank A. Armstrong Jr.
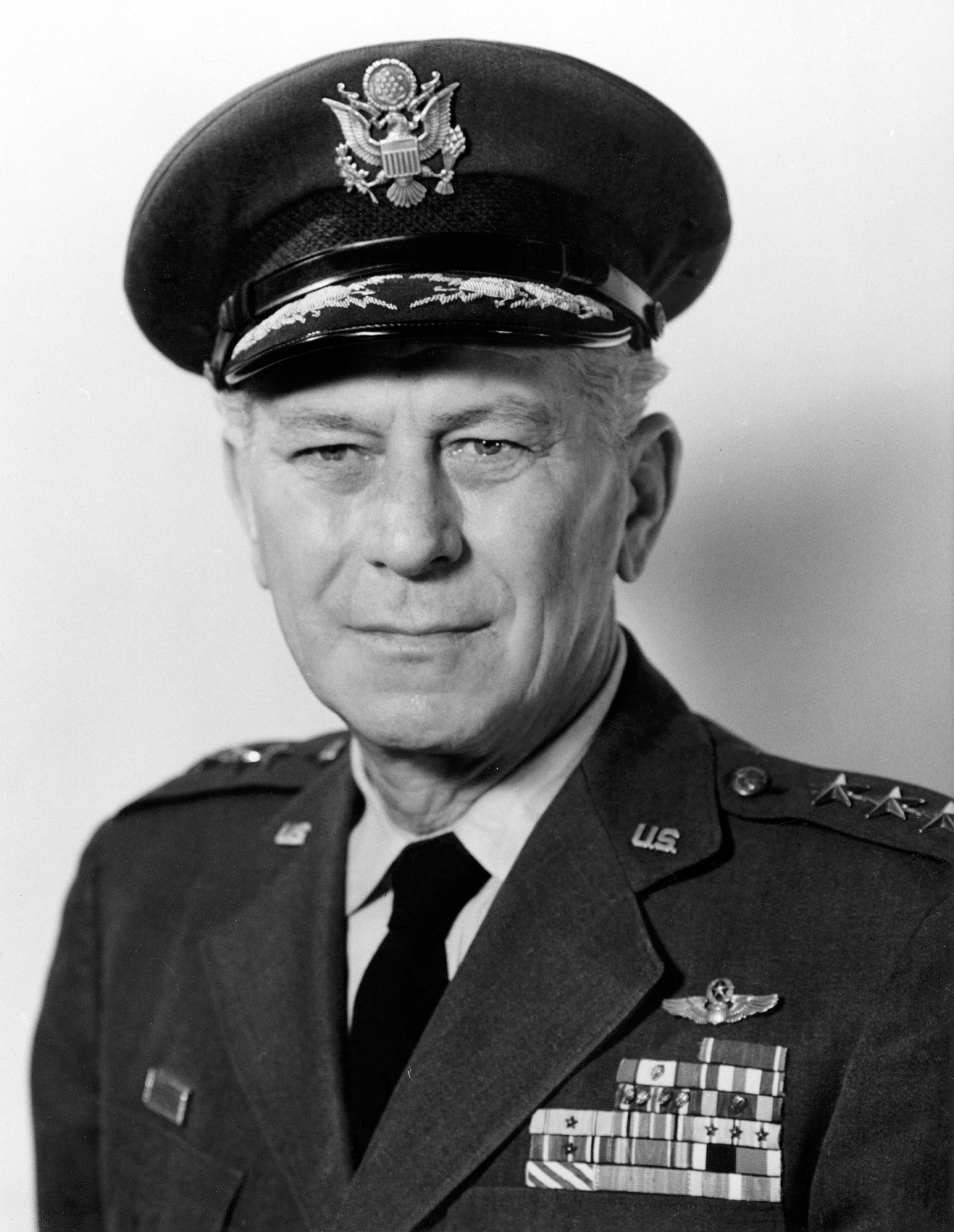
- Official photograph Lt. Gen. Frank Armstrong
- Born: Frank Alton Armstrong Jr. May 24, 1902; Hamilton, North Carolina, U.S.
- Died: August 20, 1969 (aged 67)
- Burial place: Arlington National Cemetery
- Spouse: Vernelle Lloyd Hudson
- Military career
- Allegiance: United States of America
- Branch: United States Air Force
- Service years: 1928–1961
- Rank: Lieutenant general
- Nickname: "Army"
- Commands: 13th Attack Squadron; 97th Bomb Group; 306th Bomb Group; 1st Bombardment Wing; 46th Bombardment Training Wing; 17th Bombardment Operational Training Wing; 315th Bomb Wing; Second Air Force; Alaskan Command
- Conflicts: World War II; Cold War
- Awards: Distinguished Service Cross; Distinguished Service Medal; Silver Star; Distinguished Flying Cross; Air Medal

Frank Alton Armstrong Jr. (May 24, 1902 – August 20, 1969) was a lieutenant general of the United States Air Force. As a brigadier general in the United States Army Air Forces during World War II, he was the inspiration for the main character in the novel and subsequent film, Twelve O'Clock High. After the war, he held a variety of senior leadership positions prior to and following the establishment of the USAF as an independent service in 1947. Promoted to major general in 1950, he advanced to lieutenant general in 1956 and retired at that rank in 1961.

Armstrong commanded two B-17 Flying Fortress groups and a wing each of B-17 and B-29 Superfortresses in combat operations against both Germany and Japan. He personally led the first USAAF strategic bombing attack from England in August 1942, and the last strategic raid on Japan 3 years later. He also led the first attack by the USAAF against a target in Germany.

== Early life ==
Armstrong was born in Hamilton, North Carolina. He played minor league professional baseball from 1925 to 1928, after he graduated from Wake Forest College with a law degree in 1923 and a Bachelor of Science degree in 1925.

== Military career ==
=== Air Corps ===
He enlisted as a flying cadet in the Army Air Corps on February 24, 1928, and received his flight training at Brooks Field and Kelly Field, San Antonio, Texas. He received his wings and reserve officer's commission on February 28, 1929, and his commission in the Regular Army on May 2, 1929, His first assignment was to the 2nd Bombardment Group at Langley Field, Virginia, where he married Vernelle Lloyd Hudson on March 15, 1929. His son, Frank Alton Armstrong III, was born March 7, 1930. Armstrong was made a flight instructor at March Field, Riverside, California, in 1930, and at Randolph Field, San Antonio, Texas, in 1931.

In March 1934, he was one of a group of Army pilots placed under the command of Captain Ira Eaker. On October 1, 1934, he was promoted to 1st lieutenant. Armstrong was assigned in December 1934 as a pursuit pilot at Albrook Field, Panama Canal Zone. In 1937, Armstrong earned the Distinguished Flying Cross in peacetime by skillfully landing an amphibian airplane whose engine had exploded. He was promoted to the temporary rank of captain on March 15, 1936, returned to his permanent pay grade on June 16, and was made a permanent captain on May 2, 1939.

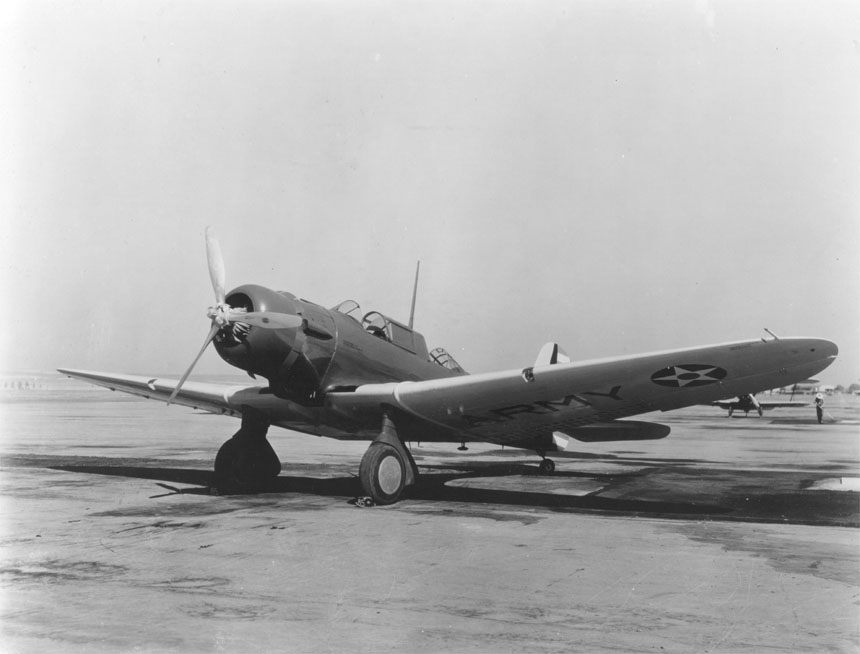
Northrop A-17

In March 1937, Armstrong transferred to the 13th Attack Squadron, Barksdale Field, Louisiana, part of the 3rd Attack Group, flying Northrop A-17 attack planes. He became its commander on May 7, 1939, and continued in command of the squadron on July 1, 1939, when it became the 13th Bombardment Squadron (Light), converting to B-18 Bolo bombers. Armstrong commanded the 13th BS until October 5, 1940. Between September 6, 1939, and October 2, 1940, he temporarily relinquished command to attend the second "short course" at the Air Corps Tactical School at Maxwell Field, Alabama.

From November 1940 to February 1941, Armstrong was a combat observer with the Royal Air Force in England, then returned to command the 90th Bombardment Squadron, Savannah AAF, Georgia, promoted to major on March 15 and lieutenant colonel on January 5, 1942. Armstrong was the Assistant Chief of Air Staff, A-3 (Operations) at Army Air Forces headquarters in Washington, D.C., when he was selected on January 24, 1942, to accompany Eaker, now a general, to England with five other officers to establish the VIII Bomber Command, Eighth Air Force, where he became its operations officer (A-3) and was promoted to colonel on March 1, 1942.

=== Combat group commander ===
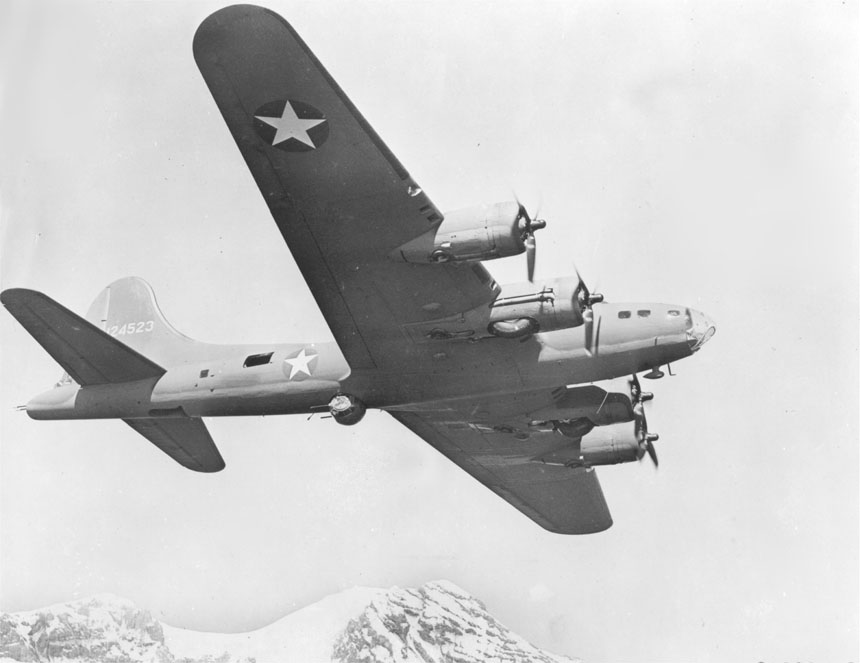
B-17 Flying Fortress

As a "trouble-shooter" for Eaker, on July 31, 1942, Armstrong relieved Colonel Cornelius W. "Connie" Cousland of command of the 97th Bomb Group (the first group of B-17 Flying Fortress bombers sent to England) and put the 340th and 341st Bomb Squadrons (who were both stationed at RAF Polebrook) through an intensive training period. The other two 97th BG Bomb Squadrons (the 342nd and 414th who were both stationed at RAF Grafton Underwood), received its ongoing training from its Base Commander and the 414th Bomb Squadron Commanding Officer, Major Rudolph Emil “Rudy” Flack. Col. Armstrong piloted the B-17E BUTCHER SHOP (41-2578) of the 340th Bomb Squadron on six missions from August 17 through September 6, 1942. Armstrong also served as Flack’s Copilot on three combat missions in August 1942 on the 21st, 27th and 29th. Armstrong served as a pilot on six of 97th BG's first 10 combat missions from August 17 to September 6, 1942. Armstrong led the first daylight heavy bomber raid made by the USAAF over Occupied Europe, receiving the Silver Star and an oak leaf cluster to the Distinguished Flying Cross. He was also awarded the British Distinguished Flying Cross for the initial mission, the first U.S. officer to be so honored. Armstrong flew the first mission as the pilot of a Fortress co-piloted by Major Paul W. Tibbets, one of his squadron commanders.

Armstrong returned to the staff of Bomber Command on September 27, 1942 until January, 1943, when Eaker again used him to rebuild another bomb group performing below standards. From January 4 to February 17, 1943, Armstrong commanded the 306th Bomb Group at RAF Thurleigh, England, and led the first mission by the Eighth Air Force to bomb Nazi Germany. His experiences with the 97th and 306th groups became the basis of Sy Bartlett and Beirne Lay Jr.'s novel and film Twelve O'Clock High. While in command of the 306th, Armstrong led the Eighth Air Force on its first mission to attack a target in Germany on January 27, 1943.

Biographers have noted that Armstrong was superstitious about flying. He always entered the B-17 by its rear fuselage door rather than through the nose hatch as most pilots did, and he always carried a pair of his son's baby shoes on all flights, for good luck in combat.

=== Wing commands ===
On February 8, 1943, Armstrong was promoted to brigadier general, and then assigned command of the newly formed 101st Provisional Combat Wing on February 17, continuing to fly combat missions over Germany. On June 16, 1943, Armstrong was advanced to command of the 1st Bombardment Wing, replacing daylight precision bombardment theorist Haywood S. Hansell, and was himself replaced at the end of July 1943 after being injured in a fire in his quarters.

During his final combat mission in the European Theater of Operations on April 5, 1943, 104 B-17s and B-24s attacked the Erla Works, used by the Luftwaffe for manufacturing and reconditioning Messerschmitt Bf 109 fighters, near the Antwerp suburb of Mortsel. The attack caused widespread casualties in the town when the force was subjected to severe air attack during its bombing run and only four bombs hit their intended target. In just eight minutes 936 people were killed, including 209 children under the age of 15 when four schools received direct hits. It was Belgium's worst loss of life in a single incident during the entire war.

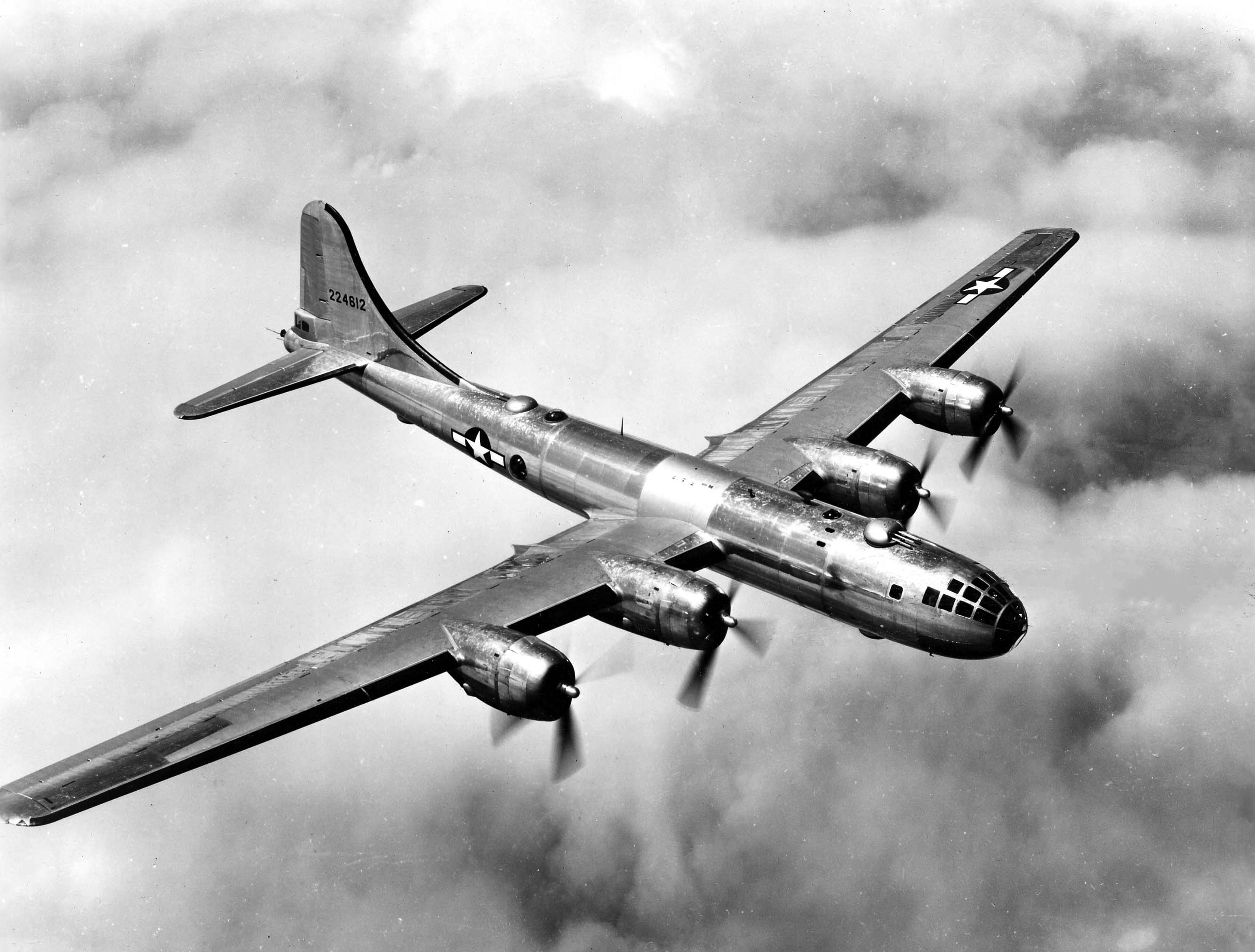
B-29 Superfortress

Armstrong returned to the United States where he commanded the 46th Bombardment Operational Training Wing (B-17) at Ardmore Army Airfield, Oklahoma (September 10, 1943, to April 6, 1944); and the 17th Bombardment Operational Training Wing (B-29) at Peterson Field, Colorado, and Grand Island Army Airfield, Nebraska (April 7, 1944, to November 7, 1944). When the Manhattan Project was still in its development stage, Armstrong was the leading candidate (along with Colonel Roscoe C. Wilson, the Army Air Force officer providing liaison support to the project) to command the unit designated to drop the atomic bomb. Armstrong's age and his injury in England militated against his selection, however, which eventually went to Tibbets instead.

On November 18, 1944, Armstrong was given command of the 315th Bomb Wing at Peterson Field, Colorado, a B-29 Superfortress wing then in training. Between March 7, 1945, and April 5, 1945, the wing deployed to Northwest Field, Guam on to fly missions against the Home Islands of Japan. On August 15, 1945, Armstrong led the longest and final heavy bombing raid in the war, with the distinction of having led both the first and last USAAF strategic bombing missions of World War II, as well as the first USAAF mission to attack Germany. In November 1945, he flew the first non-stop flight from Japan to Washington, D.C., in a B-29. He received an oak leaf cluster to the Distinguished Flying Cross for each of the above achievements.

=== USAF service ===
portrait photograph of Armstrong in the early 1950s

Armstrong continued his Air Force career following World War II, first becoming chief of staff for operations of the Pacific Air Command on January 18, 1946, and then senior air advisor at the Armed Forces Staff College, Norfolk, Virginia, on September 9, 1946. After creation of the United States Air Force, Armstrong served as deputy commanding general of the Alaskan Air Command at Fort Richardson, Alaska (March 31, 1948), and its commanding general (February 26, 1949, to December 26, 1950). While commander, he was awarded the Gold Medal of the Aero Club of Norway, the highest civil award of Norway, for helping develop a non-stop polar air route from Alaska to Norway to New York.

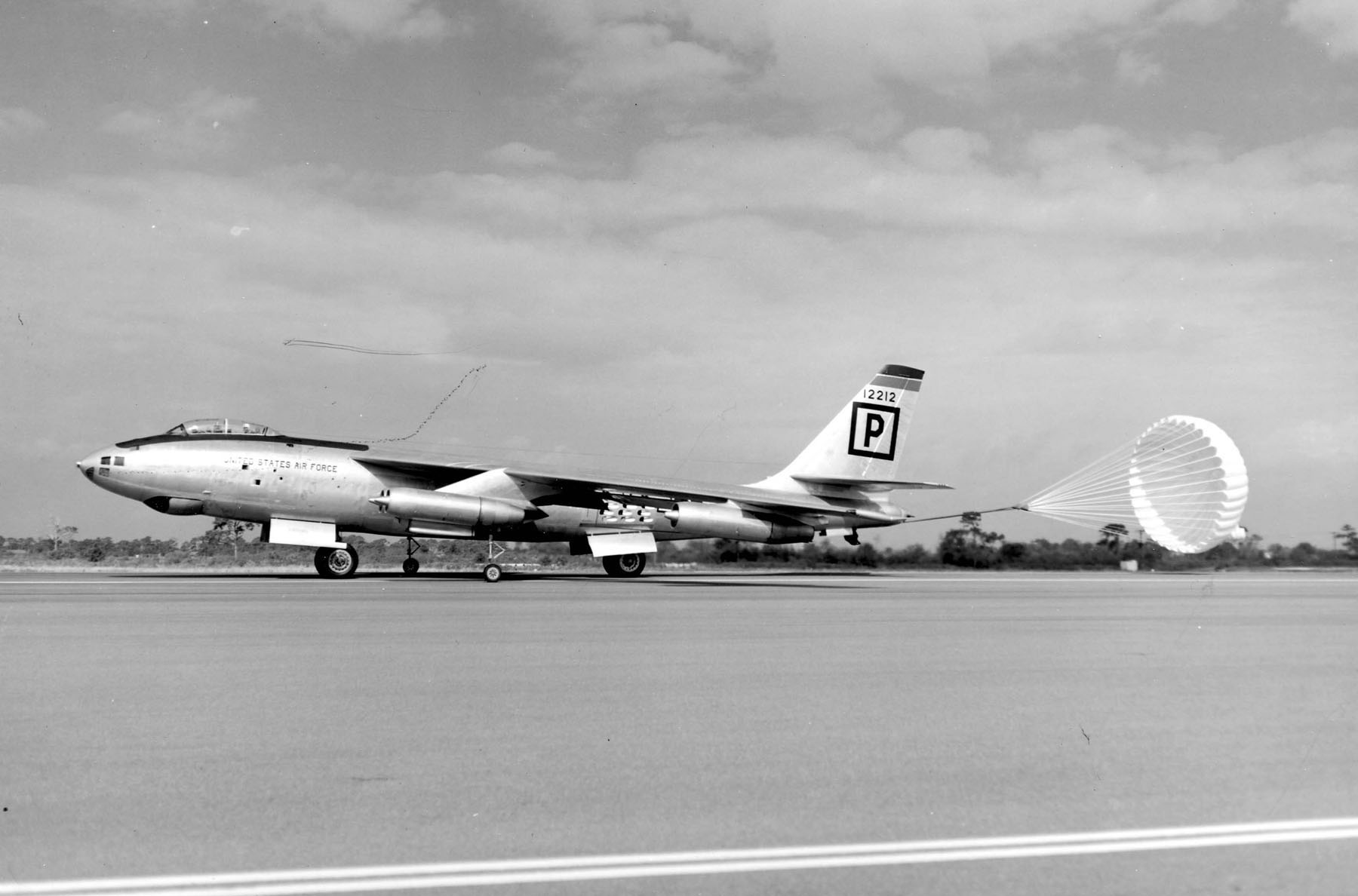
B-47B Stratojet of the 306th Bomb Wing (Medium) at MacDill AFB, Florida.

On January 13, 1950, Armstrong was promoted to major general and named base commander of Sampson Air Force Base, New York, in January 1951. On May 13, 1951, he became commanding general of the Sixth Air Division, training the first B-47 Stratojet Wing at MacDill Air Force Base, Florida, and in 1952, commander of the Second Air Force of the Strategic Air Command at Barksdale Air Force Base, Louisiana, a post he held for four years. His final posting was in July 1956, again as head of the Alaskan Air Command, and upon his promotion to lieutenant general, as commander of the joint Alaskan Command. He retired July 31, 1961.

Armstrong's son, Major Frank A. Armstrong III, USAF, followed him into the Air Force as a pilot and was killed in action in Laos on October 6, 1967. At the time, he was flying a combat mission in an A-1E Skyraider as a member of the 1st Air Commando Squadron.

== Awards and decorations ==
Source: USAF Historical Study 91: Biographical Data on Air Force General Officers, 1917-1952, Vol. I, "A-K"

- Command pilot

Distinguished Service Cross
Distinguished Service Medal (with 2 oak leaf clusters)
Silver Star
Distinguished Flying Cross (with four oak leaf clusters)
Air Medal (with oak leaf cluster)
Presidential Unit Citation
American Defense Service Medal with battle star
American Campaign Medal

European-African-Middle Eastern Campaign Medal with battle star
Asiatic-Pacific Campaign Medal with 3 battle stars
WW2 Victory Medal
Army of Occupation Medal
National Defense Service Medal with star
Air Force Longevity Ribbon with 1 silver and 2 bronze oak leaf clusters
Distinguished Flying Cross (United Kingdom)
Belgian Croix de Guerre with palm
Philippine Independence Medal
Combat Observer

Distinguished Service Cross

Headquarters, European Theater of Operations, U.S. Army, General Orders No. 53 (1943)

CITATION: "The President of the United States of America, authorized by Act of Congress July 9, 1918, takes pleasure in presenting the Distinguished Service Cross to Brigadier General Frank Alton Armstrong, Jr. (ASN: 0-17459/427A), United States Army Air Forces, for extraordinary heroism in connection with military operations against an armed enemy while serving as Commander, 97th Bombardment Group (H), TWELFTH Air Force, while personally leading his B-17 Bomber Group in a bombing mission on Antwerp, on 5 April 1943. Approximately 150 enemy fighters attacked the formation, directing their principal and continuous attacks head-on against the lead airplane flown by General Armstrong. The airplane was repeatedly hit by machine gun fire and cannon shells, and badly damaged. Fire broke out in the pilot compartment. The co-pilot, navigator, and other crew members were wounded. The oxygen system was destroyed. With great courage and personal disregard for his own safety General Armstrong relinquished his own emergency oxygen bottle to the co-pilot, divested himself of his parachute, and extinguished the flames. Then, with high resolution and dauntless perseverance he continued to lead his formation forward in the attack, thereby inspiring the entire unit with his personal courage. Upon being informed that his navigator was seriously wounded he relinquished the controls, crawled on his hands and knees, without benefit of oxygen, to his navigator and administered first aid, thereby saving his life. The audacity and courage under fire, and the coolness and skill thus displayed by this officer on this occasion, reflect the highest credit upon him and upon the armed forces of the United States."

Distinguished Service Medal

War Department, General Orders No. 104 (November 15, 1945)

CITATION: "The President of the United States of America, authorized by Act of Congress July 9, 1918, takes pleasure in presenting the Army Distinguished Service Medal to Brigadier General Frank Alton Armstrong, Jr. (ASN: 0-17459/427A), United States Army Air Forces, for exceptionally meritorious and distinguished services to the Government of the United States, in a duty of great responsibility as Commander, 315th Bomb Wing at Peterson Field, Colorado from November 1944 to August 945. The singularly distinctive accomplishments of General Armstrong and his dedicated contributions reflect the highest credit upon himself and the United States Army Air Forces."

PUBLIC INFORMASTION DIVISION JULY 13TH 1956 HEADQUARTERS STRATEGIC AIR COMMAND #6-37EP OFFUTT AIR FORCE BASE NEBRASKA

HQ SAC OMAH NEBR—Major General Frank A Armstrong Jr USAF was awarded an oak leaf cluster to the Distinguished Service Medal Tuesday at Strategic Air Command Headquarters Offutt Air Force Base Nebraska by SAC commander in chief General Curtis E Lemay for outstanding service in a position of exceedingly great responsibility.

The citation accompanying the award said that from May 1951 to July 1956 the superior leadership operational imagination and foresight displayed by General Armstrong as Commander of the 6th Air Division and Second Air Force were vitally significant contributions to the security of the United States Air Force reflecting great credit upon himself his country and the United States Air Force.

Silver Star citation August 1942

For extraordinary achievement in action while leading his group in an attack during daylight August 17, 1942 on the marshalling yard at Rouen-Sotteville France. This was the first daylight heavy bombardment mission against enemy opposition to be flown by the United States Army Air Force in the European Theater of operations. In spite of heavy anti-aircraft fire and fighter plane resistance the bombing of the objective was of the highest order of accuracy. The successful accomplishment of this mission without loss of life or plane reflects the highest degree of credit upon Colonel Armstrong and his military service.

British Distinguished Flying Cross citation July 17, 1943

For service on August 17, 1942 when he led an attack on Rouen France the first daylight raid attack by US forces from the United kingdom which was completed successfully without loss of life or Aircraft.

Oak leaf cluster to Distinguished Flying Cross October 1942

For extraordinary heroism and superior leadership in action over enemy occupied territory in Continental Europe during the period of August 17, 1942 to September 6, 1942. As commanding officer of the 97th Bombardment group colonel Armstrong personally led a total of six bombardment missions against the enemy with a loss of but one aircraft from his group. During these missions his group destroyed six enemy planes. Colonel Armstrong was largely responsible for the success of six missions of vital importance, by the specific act of leading his group in the air on repeated missions during the above period of his own volition, and by his display of tactical skill in controlling his formation so that heavy losses were avoided in spite of concentrated attacks by enemy fighters, and by his resourcefulness and flying leadership in the face of danger.

Second Oak leaf cluster to the Distinguished Flying Cross April 1943

The citation recognized Frank A. Armstrong for his role in reorganizing a heavy bombardment group and preparing its crews and equipment for operations. It also credited him with contributing to the development of high-altitude daylight precision bombing missions against targets in enemy territory during World War II. Armstrong personally led several bombing missions against heavily defended objectives in Europe while sustaining limited aircraft losses. The citation further stated that his leadership and service were regarded as an inspiration to his personnel and reflected credit upon the United States Armed Forces.

Air Medal January 1943

For extraordinary meritorious achievement while serving as a pilot of a B17 airplane on five Aerial combat missions over enemy occupied Continental Europe 17 August 19 August 20 August 21 August and 24 August 1942. The Courage and skill displayed by colonel Armstrong upon these occasions reflect highest credit upon himself and the armed forces of the United States.

== Legacy ==
His papers (including correspondence, memoirs, reports, flight records, flight log, and speeches) were donated to the East Carolina Manuscript Collection in Joyner Library at East Carolina University.
