= 40th Flight Test Squadron =

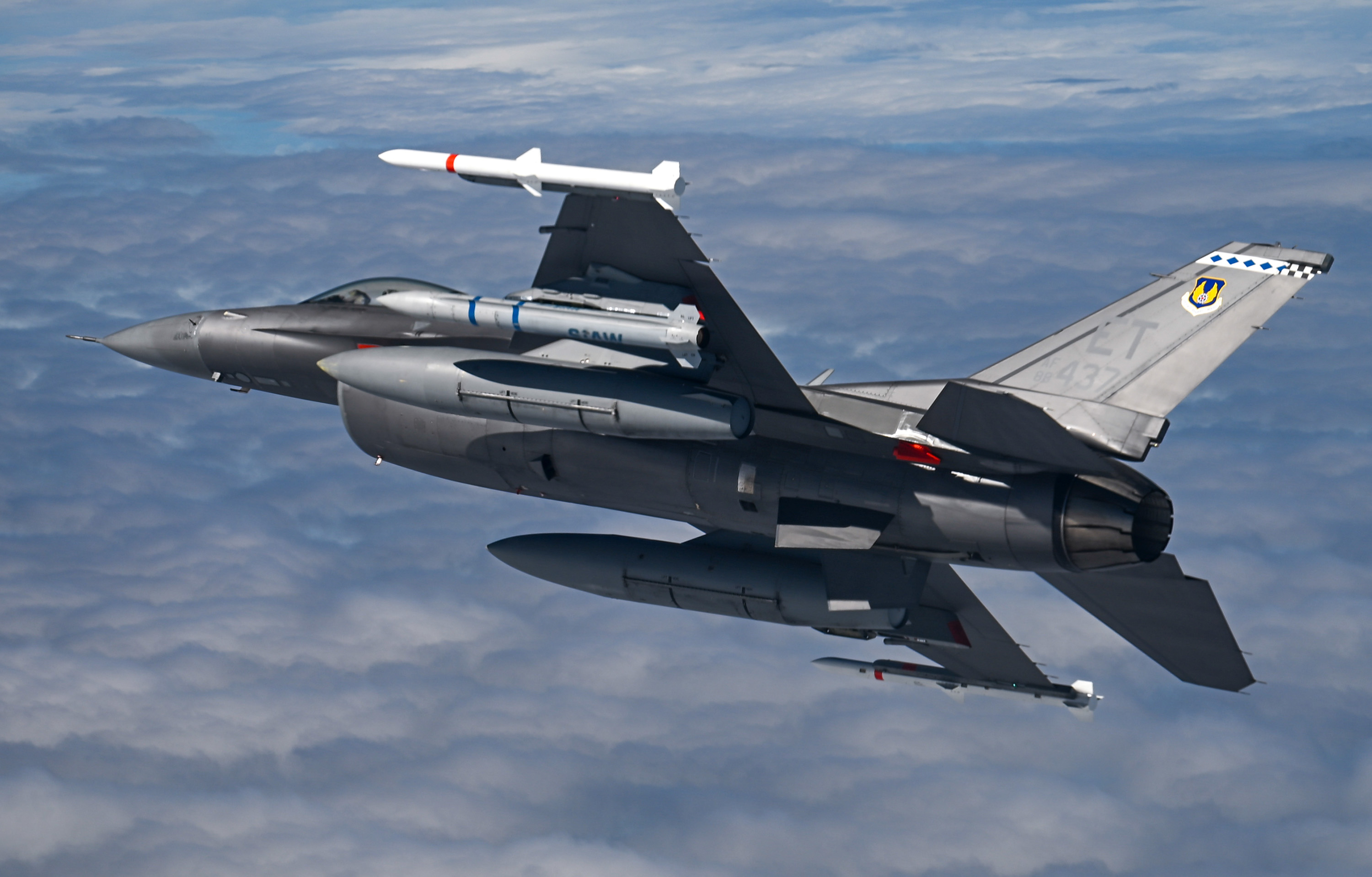
- 40th Flight Test Squadron F-16 Fighting Falcon
- Active: 1940–1970; 1971–1982; --present
- Country: United States
- Branch: United States Air Force
- Role: Flight Testing
- Part of: Air Force Materiel Command
- Nickname: Fighting Fortieth (1959–1982)
- Engagements: Southwest Pacific Theater; Korean War
- Decorations: Distinguished Unit Citation; Air Force Outstanding Unit Award; Philippine Presidential Unit Citation; Republic of Korea Presidential Unit Citation

Insignia
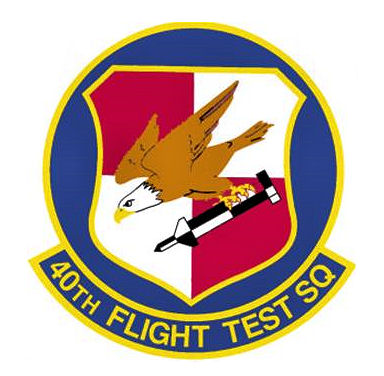
- 40th Flight Test Squadron emblem (Note: Approved 27 July 1983.)

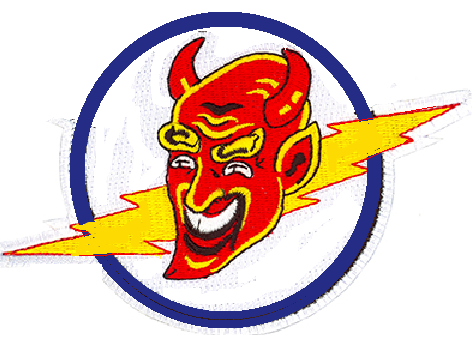
- 40th Fighter-Interceptor Squadron emblem (Note: Approved 9 July 1959.)

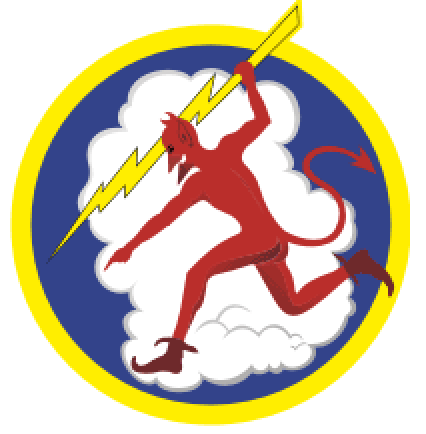
- 40th Pursuit Squadron emblem (Note: Approved 19 June 1941.)

The 40th Flight Test Squadron is a United States Air Force unit. It is assigned to the 96th Operations Group, based at Eglin Air Force Base, Florida.

== History ==
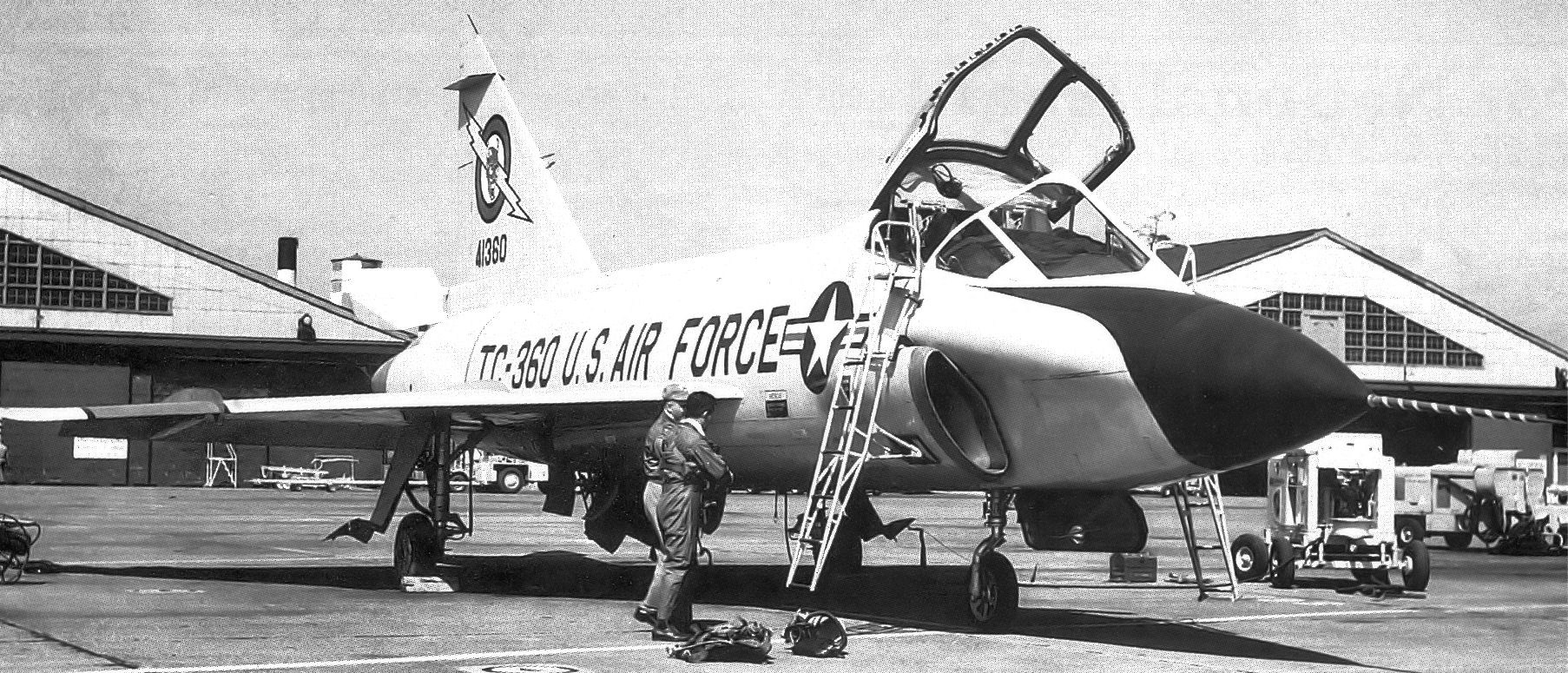
40th Fighter-Interceptor Squadron Convair TF-102A-45-CO Delta Dagger 56-2360, Johnson AB, Japan, 1963

"Combat in Southwest and Western Pacific, 2 June 1942 – 14 August 1945. Served in the occupation force in Japan, 1945–1950. Combat in Korea, 8 July 1950 – 25 May 1951. Air defense in Japan and Korea, June 1951 – June 1965. Trained cadres for transfer to Southeast Asia, 1966–1969. Not manned, 10 May 1969 – 15 October 1970 and 1 June 1972 – 30 April 1982."

Conducted test and evaluation missions, using the various aircraft, 1982–present.

In 2022, the squadron added the Kratos XQ-58A Valkyrie to its inventory. This semi-autonomous unmanned aerial vehicle is capable of determining an optimal mission flight path based on inputs from ground stations or airborne fighter aircraft. Testing will be led by the Autonomous Aircraft Experimentation Team.

== Lineage ==
40th Tactical Fighter Squadron

- Constituted as the 40th Pursuit Squadron (Interceptor) on 22 December 1939

Activated on 1 February 1940
Redesignated 40th Fighter Squadron on 15 May 1942
Redesignated 40th Fighter Squadron, Single Engine on 20 August 1943
Redesignated 40th Fighter-Interceptor Squadron on 20 January 1950
Redesignated 40th Tactical Fighter Squadron on 20 June 1965
Inactivated on 15 October 1970

- Activated on 1 October 1971

Inactivated on 30 April 1982

- Consolidated with the 3247th Test Squadron on 1 October 1992 as the 40th Flight Test Squadron

40th Flight Test Squadron

- Designated as the 3247th Test Squadron and activated on 25 June 1982
- Consolidated with the 40th Tactical Fighter Squadron as the 40th Test Squadron on 1 October 1992

Redesignated 40th Flight Test Squadron on 15 March 1994

=== Assignments ===
- 31st Pursuit Group, 1 February 1940
- 35th Pursuit Group (later 35th Fighter Group, 35th Fighter-Interceptor Group), 15 January 1942 (attached to 35th Fighter-Interceptor Wing, 15 January–14 July 1954 and 8 October 1956 – 1 July 1957)
- 41st Air Division, 1 October 1957 (attached to 3d Bombardment Wing, 1 December 1961 – 31 May 1962
- Tactical Air Command, c. 17 June 1965
- 33d Tactical Fighter Wing, 20 June 1965 – 15 October 1970
- 355th Tactical Fighter Wing, 1 October 1971 – 1 June 1972
- 35th Tactical Fighter Wing, 1 June 1972 – 30 April 1982
- 3246th Test Wing, 25 June 1982
- 46th Test Wing, 1 October 1992
- 46th Operations Group, 8 September 1993
- 96th Operations Group, 1 October 2012 – present

=== Stations ===
- Selfridge Field, Michigan, 1 February 1940
- Baer Field, Indiana, 6 December 1941
- Port Angeles, Washington, 16 December 1941 – c. 22 January 1942
- Brisbane, Australia, 25 February 1942
- Ballarat Airport, Australia, 9 March 1942
- Mount Gambier Airport, Australia, 16 March 1942
- Townsville Airport, Australia, April 1942
- Berry Airfield (12 Mile Drome), New Guinea, 2 June 1942
- Townsville Airport, Australia, 30 July 1942
- Rogers Airfield (30 Mile Drome), New Guinea, c. 25 November 1942
- Tsili Tsili Airfield, New Guinea, 11 August 1943
- Nadzab Airfield, New Guinea, October 1943
- Gusap Airfield, New Guinea, 5 February 1944
- Nadzab Airfield, New Guinea, 9 June 1944
- Kornasoren Airfield Noemfoor, Schouten Islands, Netherlands East Indies, 4 August 1944
- Owi Airfield, Schouten Islands, Netherlands East Indies, 14 September 1944
- Wama Airfield, Morotai, Netherlands East Indies, 17 October 1944
- Mangaldan Airfield, Luzon, Philippines, 21 January 1945
- Lingayen Airfield, Luzon, Philippines, 11 April 1945
- Clark Field, Luzon, Philippines, 19 April 1945
- Yontan Airfield, Okinawa, Ryuku Islands, 30 June 1945
- Irumagawa Air Base, Japan, 10 October 1945
- Yokota Air Base, Japan, 13 March 1950
- Ashiya Air Base, Japan, 7 July 1950
- Pohang Air Base (K-3), South Korea, 17 July 1950
- Tsuiki Air Base, Japan, 13 August 1950
- Pohang AB (K-3), South Korea, 7 October 1950
- Yonpo Air Base (K-27), North Korea, 18 November 1950
- Pusan West Air Base (K-1), South Korea, 3 December 1950
- Misawa Air Base, Japan, 25 May 1951
- Johnson Air Base, Japan, 1 July 1951 (detachment at Komaki Air Base, Japan, 13 July 1953 – 17 February 1955)
- Yokota Air Base, Japan, 13 August 1954 – c. 15 June 1965
- Eglin Air Force Base, Florida, 20 June 1965 – 15 October 1970
- Davis–Monthan Air Force Base, Arizona, 1 October 1971
- George Air Force Base, California, 1 June 1972 – 30 April 1982
- Eglin Air Force Base, Florida, 25 June 1982 – present

=== Aircraft ===
- Bell P-39 Airacobra, 1941–1944
- Republic P-47 Thunderbolt, 1944–1945
- North American P-51 Mustang (later F-51, 1945–1950, 1950–1953
- Lockheed F-80 Shooting Star, 1950, 1953–1954
- North American F-86D Sabre, 1953–1961
- Convair F-102 Delta Dagger, 1960–1965
- McDonnell F-4 Phantom II 1965–1969, 1982–present
- LTV A-7 Corsair II, 1971–1972
- Fairchild Republic A-10 Thunderbolt II, 1982–2025
- McDonnell Douglas F-15 Eagle, 1982–present
- General Dynamics F-16 Fighting Falcon, 1982–present
- General Dynamics F-111 Aardvark, 1982–1996
- Northrop T-38 Talon, 1982–present
- North American T-39 Sabreliner, 1982–unknown
- Lockheed C-130 Hercules, 1982–present
- Bell Boeing CV-22 Osprey, 1982–present
- Bell UH-1 Huey, 1982–present
- Boeing F-15EX Eagle II, 2021-present
- Kratos XQ-58A Valkyrie, 2022–present

== See also ==
- United States Army Air Forces in Australia
