= 46th Test Wing =

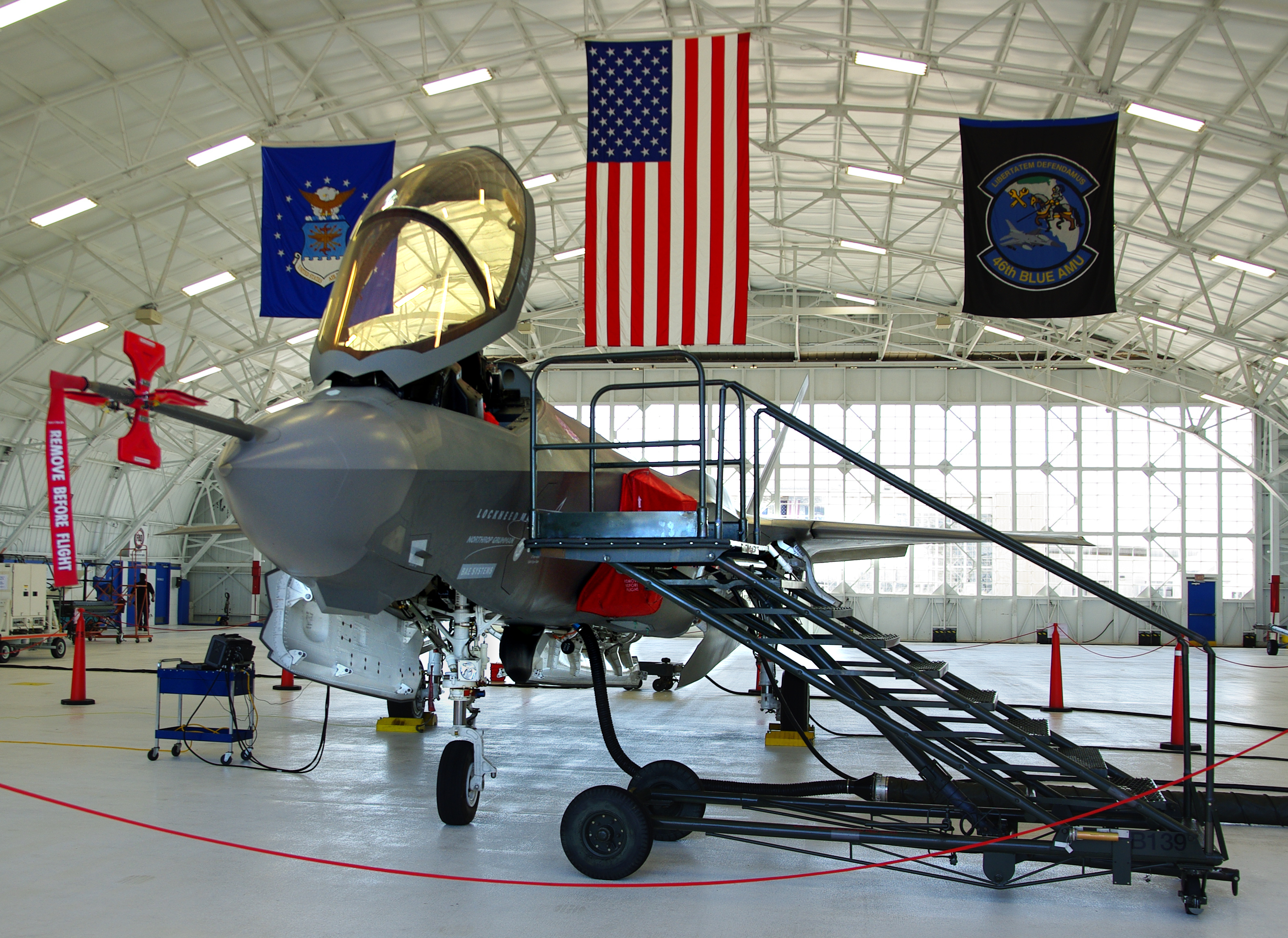
- F-35 on display during its first visit to Eglin and the 46th Test Wing
- Active: 1941–1944; 1975–1982; 1992–2012
- Country: United States
- Branch: United States Air Force
- Role: Developmental test and evaluation
- Mottos: Custos Libertate (Latin for 'Guardians of Liberty') (Note: Official translation. However, Custos is singular so a proper translation would be Guardian of Liberty.) (1942–1944); Support (1975–1983); Proof by Trial (1993–2012)
- Decorations: Air Force Outstanding Unit Award

Insignia
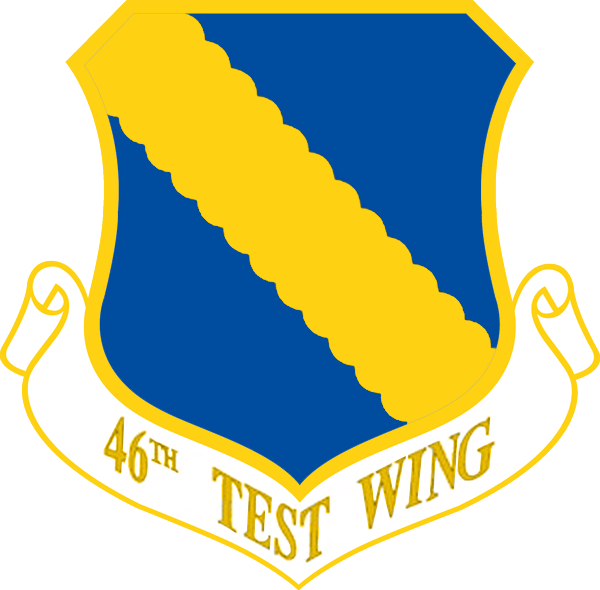
- 46th Test Wing emblem (Note: Approved 9 December 1993.)

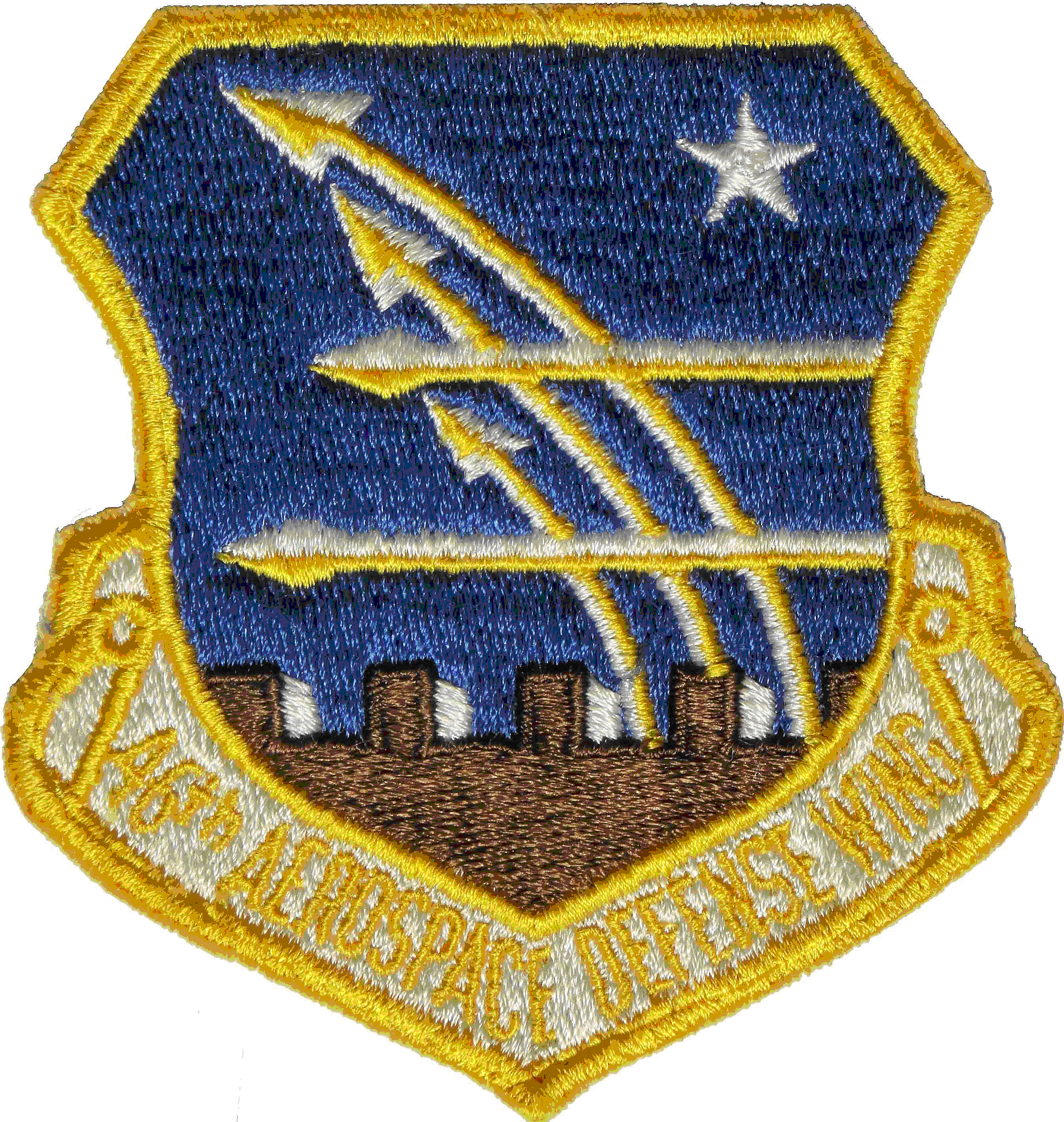
- Patch with 46th Aerospace Defense Wing emblem (Note: Approved 25 March 1975. This emblem was originally approved for the 4600th Air Base Wing on 13 July 1961. Ravenstein, p. 75. Ravenstein claims the emblem was used without authorization upon activation. Ravenstein, p. 75.)

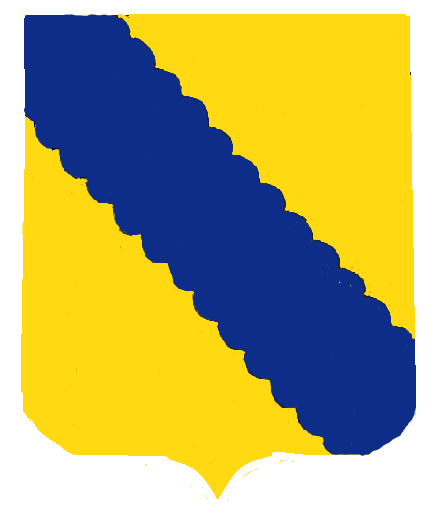
- 46th Bombardment Group emblem (Note: Approved 14 July 1942.)

The 46th Test Wing is an inactive wing of the United States Air Force last based at Eglin Air Force Base, Florida. The wing's 46th Test Group was a tenant unit at Holloman Air Force Base, New Mexico.

The wing's history dates from 1941, when the Army Air Forces (AAF) activated the 46th Bombardment Group. The group served in the early period of the United States' involvement in World War II flying antisubmarine missions over the Gulf of Mexico. It then served as a training unit until being disbanded in 1944 in a general reorganization of AAF units.

The 46th Aerospace Defense Wing replaced the 4600th Air Base Wing to provide administrative and logistic support to headquarters elements of Air Defense Command and North American Air Defense Command at Ent Air Force Base, Peterson Air Force Base, and the Cheyenne Mountain Complex. It was inactivated in 1983.

The wing and group were consolidated into a single unit in 1984, but remained inactive until 1992, when the consolidated unit was activated at Eglin as the 46th Test Wing. The wing managed test and development at Eglin and at Holloman until 2012 when its functions were combined with those of the 96th Air Base Wing in a reorganization of Air Force Materiel Command.

== Mission ==
Media related to 46th Test Wing (United States Air Force) at Wikimedia Commons

The wing executed developmental test and evaluation for Air Force air-delivered weapons, navigation, and guidance systems, command and control systems and Air Force special operations systems.

== History ==
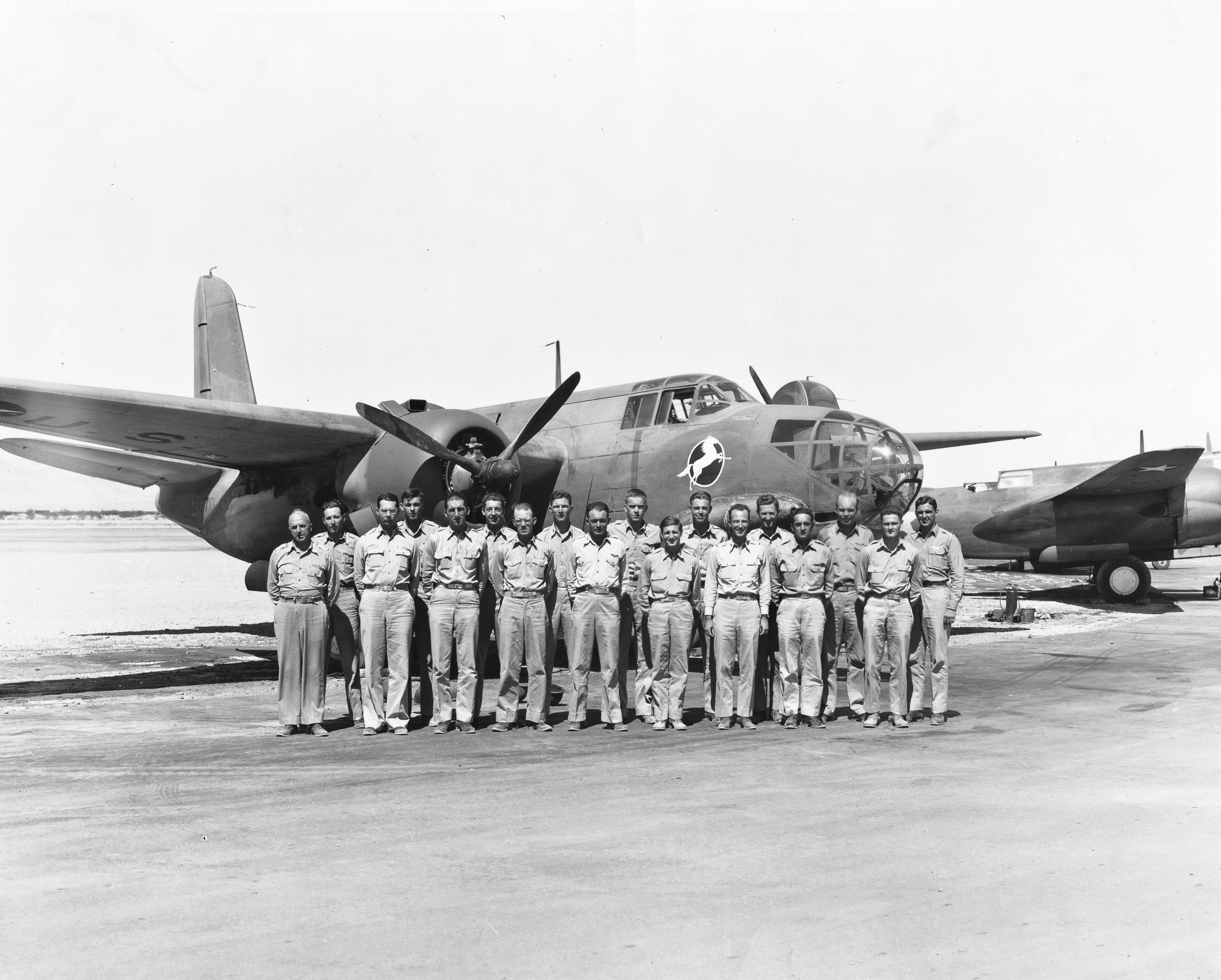
The 87th Bombardment Squadron

=== World War II ===
The wing was activated as the 46th Bombardment Group (Light) and in 1941, equipped with Douglas A-20 Havoc aircraft. Its operational squadrons were the 50th, 51st, and 53d Bombardment Squadrons, and the 8th Reconnaissance Squadron. Shortly after activation in 1941, the 8th Reconnaissance Sq mission changed and it became the 87th Bombardment Squadron. The 46th participated in maneuvers, including desert maneuvers, and flew anti-submarine warfare patrol and search missions over the Gulf of Mexico in early 1942. It also served as an operational training unit, which involved the use of an oversized parent unit to provide cadres for "satellite groups." In late 1943 the group mission changed to replacement training of individual pilots and aircrews (RTU). Just before disbanding, the group began to convert to North American B-25 Mitchells. In 1944, the group was disbanded and its personnel, equipment and functions transferred to the 333d AAF Base Unit (Replacement Training Unit, Light Bombardment) at Morris Field in a major reorganization of the Army Air Forces in which RTUs were disbanded and training activities given to base units.

=== Cold War ===
In March 1975, 46th Aerospace Defense Wing was activated to replace the 4600th Air Base Wing at Peterson Field, where it took over the personnel, equipment, and of the 4600th and its mission of administering facilities of North American Air Defense Command (NORAD), Aerospace Defense Command (ADC), and Army Air Defense Command (ARADCOM) located on Ent Air Force Base, Peterson Air Force Base, and the Cheyenne Mountain Complex, plus various other nearby off-base facilities, which the 4600th wing had been performing from Ent Air Force Base, then from Peterson Field since April 1958. Despite its name, the wing was a "disguised" air base wing. Although the provision of administrative and logistics support was the wing's primary mission, its flying training squadron served NORAD and ADC mission requirements and provided flying training for cadets at the United States Air Force Academy until 1 October 1979, when ADC was inactivated and the wing transferred to the 4th Air Division of Strategic Air Command. In April 1983, the 46th was inactivated and replaced by the 1st Space Wing.

=== Test Operations ===
The 46th was redesignated as the 46th Test Wing and replaced the 3246th Test Wing at Eglin Air Force Base, Florida in October 1992. It designed and performed flight and ground developmental tests with uniquely modified aircraft and facilities for conventional weapons and electronic combat systems. The wing also supported other Department of Defense components and numerous allied nations during test and exercises and managed the largest test range in the free world. Weapons systems recently tested by the wing include the Small Diameter Bomb, Terminal High Altitude Area Defense System, Joint Air-to-Surface Standoff Missile, Target Void Sensing Fuze, Advanced Medium Range Air-to-Air Missile (AMRAAM), and the Trident Intercontinental Ballistic Missile. The wing worked closely with the 53d Wing of Air Combat Command, which performed operational testing of many of the same weapons systems.

In February 2012, the wing relocated its UH-1N helicopters from Eglin to Duke Field in anticipation of a 250 percent increase in helicopter developmental test programs. The wing mission transferred to the 96th Air Base Wing, which was redesignated as the 96th Test Wing on 18 July 2012. The 46th Test Wing was subsequently inactivated on 1 October 2012.

== Lineage ==
Bombardment Group

- Constituted as the 46th Bombardment Group (Light) on 20 November 1940

Activated on 15 January 1941
Disbanded on 1 May 1944

- Reconstituted and consolidated with the 46th Aerospace Defense Wing as the 46th Aerospace Defense Wing on 31 January 1984

Wing

- Constituted as the 46th Aerospace Defense Wing on 10 February 1975

Activated on 15 March 1975
Inactivated on 1 April 1983

- Consolidated with the 46th Bombardment Group (Light) on 31 January 1984
- Redesignated 46th Test Wing on 24 September 1992

Activated on 1 October 1992.
Inactivated on 1 October 2012

=== Assignments ===
- Air Force Combat Command, 15 January 1941
- V Air Support Command (later, Ninth Air Force), 1 September 1941
- Third Air Force, 18 April 1942
- XII Bomber Command, 2 May 1942
- III Bomber Command, 8 May 1942
- Second Air Force, ca. 8 July 1942
- I Ground Air Support Command, c. 10 November 1942
- III Air Support Command, 25 January 1943
- III Bomber Command, 6 August 1943 – 1 May 1944
- Aerospace Defense Command, 15 March 1975
- 4th Air Division, 1 October 1979 – 1 April 1983
- Air Force Development Test Center (later, Air Armament Center), 1 October 1992 – 1 October 2012 (attached to Air Force Test Center after 18 July 2012)

=== Components ===
Groups

- 46th Logistics Group (later 46th Maintenance Group): ca. 8 September 1993 – 1 October 2012 (attached to 96th Test Wing after 18 July 2012)
- 46th Operations Group: 8 September 1993 – 1 October 2012 (attached to 96th Test Wing after 18 July 2012)
- 46th Range Group 11 May 2006 – 1 October 2012 (attached to 96th Test Wing after 18 July 2012)
- 46th Test Group: 1 October 1992 – 1 October 2012 (attached to 96th Test Wing after 18 July 2012)

Holloman Air Force Base, New Mexico

Operational Squadrons

- 8th Reconnaissance Squadron (later, 87th Bombardment Squadron): 15 January 1941 – 1 May 1944
- 40th Test Squadron: 1 October 1992 – 8 September 1993
- 46th Flying Training Squadron: 15 March 1975 – 1 October 1979
- 50th Bombardment Squadron: 15 January 1941 – 1 May 1944
- 51st Bombardment Squadron: 15 January 1941 – 1 May 1944
- 53d Bombardment Squadron: 15 January 1941 – 1 May 1944

Support Units

- 46th Civil Engineering Squadron: 15 March 1975 – 1 April 1983
- 46th Consolidated Aircraft Maintenance Squadron: 15 March 1975 – 1 November 1981
- 46th Security Police Squadron: 15 March 1975 – 1 April 1983
- 46th Supply Squadron: 15 March 1975 – 1 April 1983
- 46th Transportation Squadron: 15 March 1975 – 1 April 1983
- 46th Weather Squadron: 1 October 1992 – 8 September 1993
- USAF Clinic, Peterson: 15 March 1975 – 1 April 1983

=== Stations ===
- Army Air Base, Savannah, Georgia, 15 January 1941
- Bowman Field, Kentucky, 20 May 1941
- Barksdale Field, Louisiana, 2 February 1942
- Galveston Municipal Airport, Texas, 1 April 1942
- Blythe Army Air Base, California, 23 May 1942
- Will Rogers Field, Oklahoma, 10 November 1942
- Drew Field, Florida, 9 October 1943
- Morris Field, North Carolina, 6 November 1943 – 1 May 1944
- Peterson Field (later, Air Force Base), Colorado, 15 March 1975 – 1 April 1983
- Eglin Air Force Base, Florida, 1 October 1992 – 18 July 2012

=== Aircraft and Launch Vehicles Operated ===
- Douglas A-20 Havoc (1941–1944)
- North American B-25 Mitchell (1944)
- Douglas C-118 Liftmaster (1975)
- Convair C-131 Samaritan (1975)
- Lockheed T-33 Shooting Star (1975–1979)
- Cessna T-37 Tweet (1975–1979)
- North American T-39 Sabreliner (1975)
- Aero Commander U-4 (1975–1979)
- Bell UH-1 Iroquois (1992–2012)
- Lockheed C-130 Hercules (1992–2012)
- General Dynamics F-111 Aardvark (1992–1995)
- McDonnell Douglas RF-4 Phantom II (1992–1993)
- McDonnell Douglas F-15 Eagle (1992–2012)
- General Dynamics F-16 Fighting Falcon (1992–2012)
- Fairchild Republic A-10 Thunderbolt II (1996–2012)

=== Awards and campaign ===
| Award streamer | Award | Dates | Notes |
|---|---|---|---|
| | Air Force Outstanding Unit Award | 1 July 1975–30 June 1977 | 46th Aerospace Defense Wing |
| | Air Force Outstanding Unit Award | 1 July 1977–30 June 1979 | 46th Aerospace Defense Wing |
| | Air Force Outstanding Unit Award | 1 October 1992-31 December 1992 | 46th Test Wing (Note: This was a shared award with 3246th Test Wing.) |
| | Air Force Outstanding Unit Award | 1 January 1992–31 December 1993 | 46th Test Wing |
| | Air Force Outstanding Unit Award | 1 January 1994–31 December 1994 | 46th Test Wing |
| | Air Force Outstanding Unit Award | 1 January 1995–31 December 1995 | 46th Test Wing |
| | Air Force Outstanding Unit Award | 1 January 1997–31 December 1997 | 46th Test Wing |
| | Air Force Outstanding Unit Award | 1 January 1998–31 December 1999 | 46th Test Wing |
| | Air Force Outstanding Unit Award | 1 January 2001–31 December 2001 | 46th Test Wing |
| | Air Force Outstanding Unit Award | 1 January 2002–31 December 2002 | 46th Test Wing |
| | Air Force Outstanding Unit Award | 1 January 2000–31 December 2000 | 46th Test Wing |
| | Air Force Outstanding Unit Award | 1 January 2003–31 December 2003 | 46th Test Wing |
| | Air Force Outstanding Unit Award | 1 January 2004–31 December 2004 | 46th Test Wing |
| | Air Force Outstanding Unit Award | 1 January 2005–31 December 2005 | 46th Test Wing |
| | Air Force Outstanding Unit Award | 1 January 2006–31 December 2006 | 46th Test Wing |
| | Air Force Outstanding Unit Award | 1 January 2008–31 December 2008 | 46th Test Wing |
| | Air Force Outstanding Unit Award | 1 January 2010 – 31 December 2010 | 46th Test Wing |

| Campaign Streamer | Campaign | Dates | Notes |
|---|---|---|---|
| | Antisubmarine | 7 December 1941 – 23 May 42 | 46th Bombardment Group |
