= Everglades Airpark =

Airport in Florida, U.S.

Coordinates: 25°50′55.9000″N 081°23′25.0″W

- IATA: none; ICAO: none; FAA LID: X01

Summary
- Airport type: Public use
- Owner: Collier County Arpt Auth
- Operator: Manager: Nick Rossdale Director: Andrew Bennett
- Serves: Everglades City, Florida
- Location: Collier County, Florida
- Elevation AMSL: 5 ft (1.5 m)
- Interactive map of Everglades Airpark

Runways
Direction	Length		Surface
Direction	ft	m	Surface
15/33	2,400	732	Asphalt

Statistics (2019)
- Aircraft operations (year ending 2/28/2019): 2,400
- Based aircraft: 4
- Source: Federal Aviation Administration

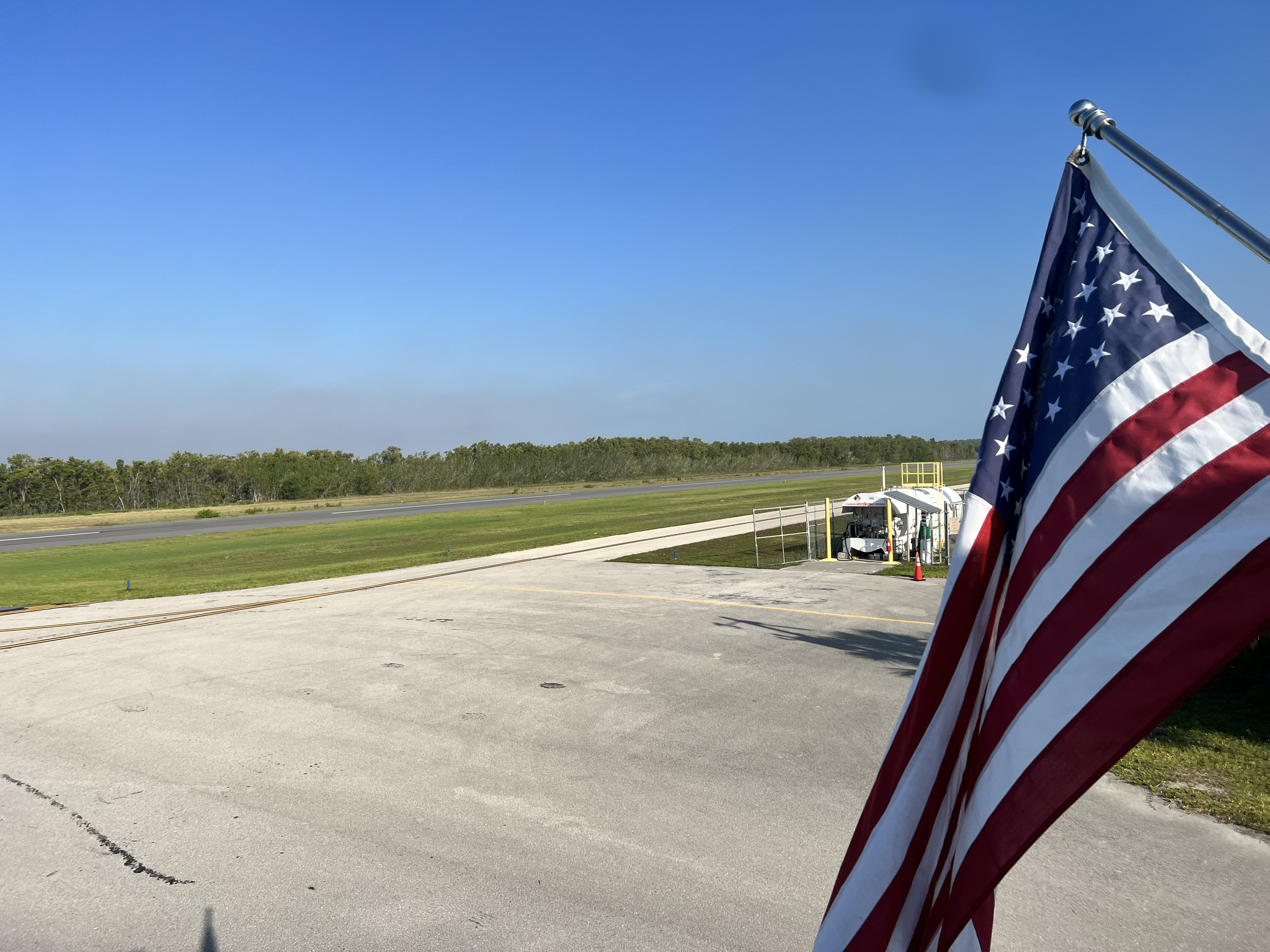

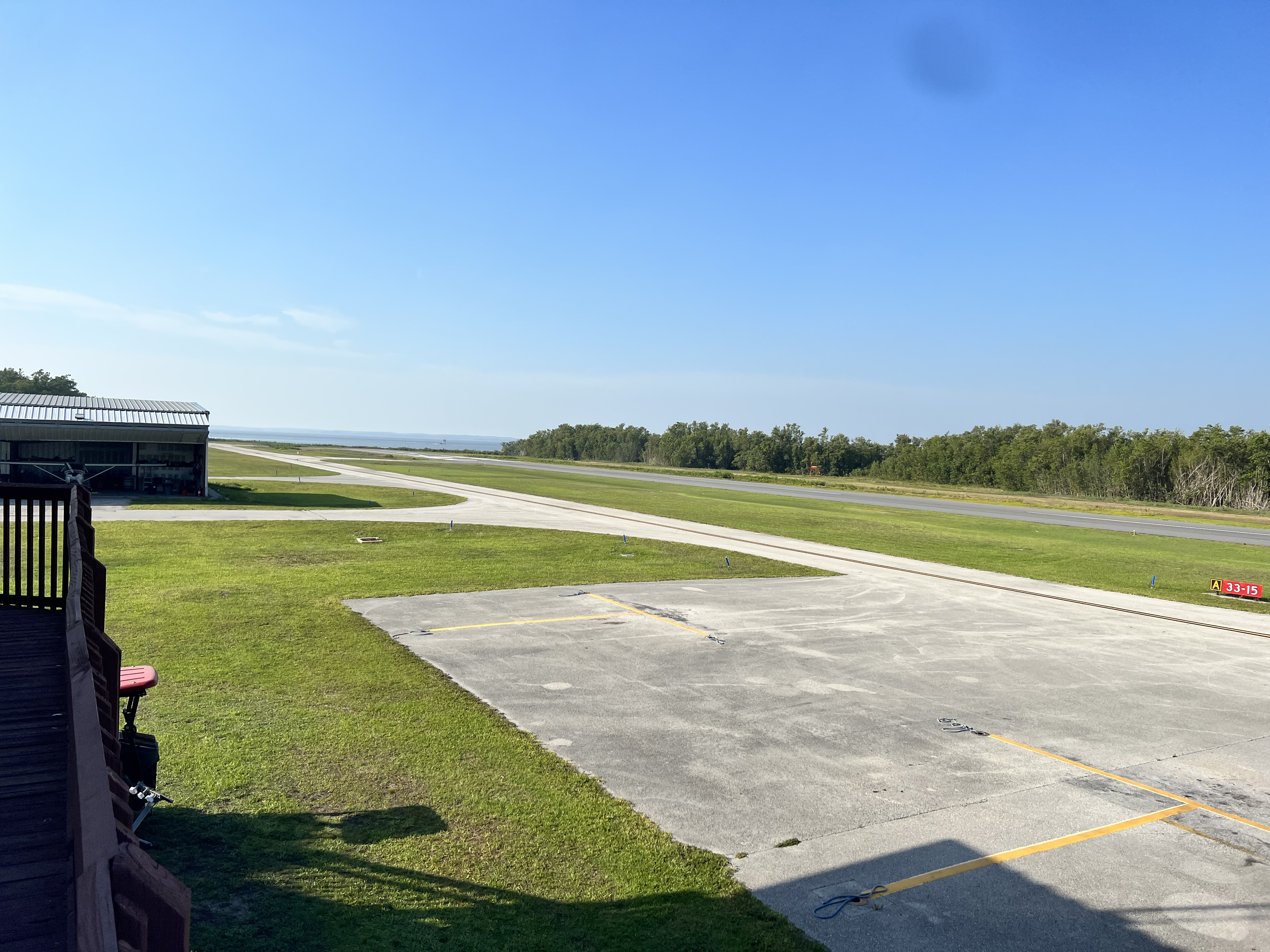
Everglades City Airpark

Everglades Airpark (FAA LID: X01) is a public-use airport located 1 mile (1.6 km) southwest of the central business district of the city of Everglades City in Collier County, Florida, United States. The airport is publicly owned.

== History ==
The airport was constructed in the 1940s by the Collier family and was used by the Civil Air Patrol, the Air Force, and private pilots. The runway was initially a 1,000 foot paved strip with 500 feet of grass on either end. President Harry Truman dedicated the Everglades National Park at the airport in December 1947.

In 1968, Collier County purchased Everglades Airpark from the Collier family for $125,000. In 1993, the Collier County Airport Authority was created to manage the development and operations of three local, publicly owned airports: Everglades Airpark, Immokalee Regional Airport, and Marco Island Executive Airport.

=== Potential Closure ===
Around the start of 2025, Collier County announced a plan to permanently close the Everglades Airpark. The county cited the costs of repairing and maintaining hangars and fuel systems damaged by Hurricane Ian, as well as the lack of tenants following the COVID-19 pandemic, among the reasons it had little interest in repairing the airport.

Outcry from local pilots and the Aircraft Owners and Pilots Association encouraged the county to repair the fuel system, reopen a wait list for hangars, and keep the airport open. The county launched a study and created a committee in 2025 to study the airport's future aiming to find whether the airport could return to profitability.

== Facilities and Aircraft ==
The airport has a single runway, measuring 2400 x 60 ft (732 x 18 m) and paved with asphalt.

Hangars and fuel farms damaged and neglected throughout the early 2020s were repaired between 2024 and 2025 in an effort to revitalize the airport and return it to profitability.

== Accidents and incidents ==
=== Aircraft Accidents ===
- On April 6, 2012, an experimental amateur-built Comp Air 8 was substantially damaged, and its pilot killed, when it impacted the ground shortly after takeoff from the Everglades Airpark. The pilot was departing after filming a fishing show. Accident witnesses observed the airplane make sharp maneuvers just after departure, including climbing with an “extremely sharp upward angle" and flying nearly inverted. The probable cause of the accident was found to be the pilot’s failure to maintain sufficient airspeed during the initial climb after takeoff, which resulted in an aerodynamic stall and loss of airplane control.
- On October 18, 2014, a Piper PA24 Comanche overran the runway at the Everglades Airport and came to rest inverted in 6 feet of water at the end of the airport.

=== Hurricane Damage ===
On September 9, 1960, Hurricane Donna destroyed the airport's hangar, office, fuel station, and other buildings.

Hurricane Ian did over $1.2 million in damage to the airport in 2022.

== See also ==
- List of airports in Florida
