= Belle Glade =

Belle Glade may refer to:

- Belle Glade, Florida, a small city next to Lake Okeechobee in Palm Beach County
- Belle Glade Camp, Florida, a census designated place adjacent to the city of Belle Glade
- Belle Glade culture, an archaeological culture in the Lake Okeechobee basin and Kissimmee River Valley
- Belle Glade (archaeological site), the type site for the Belle Glade culture
- Belle Glade State Municipal Airport, a public-use airport adjacent to the city of Belle Glade
