= PHK =

PHK may refer to:

- Palm Beach County Glades Airport (IATA code)
- Pardes Hanna-Karkur, a local council in Israel
- Phosphorylase kinase, PhK, an enzyme
- Poul-Henning Kamp, a Danish software developer
- Para Hills Knights SC, a South Australian association football team
