= List of airports in Florida =

This is a list of airports in Florida (a U.S. state), grouped by type and sorted by location. It contains all public-use and military airports in the state. Some private-use and former airports may be included where notable, such airports that were previously public-use, those with commercial enplanements recorded by the FAA or airports assigned an IATA airport code.

== Airports ==
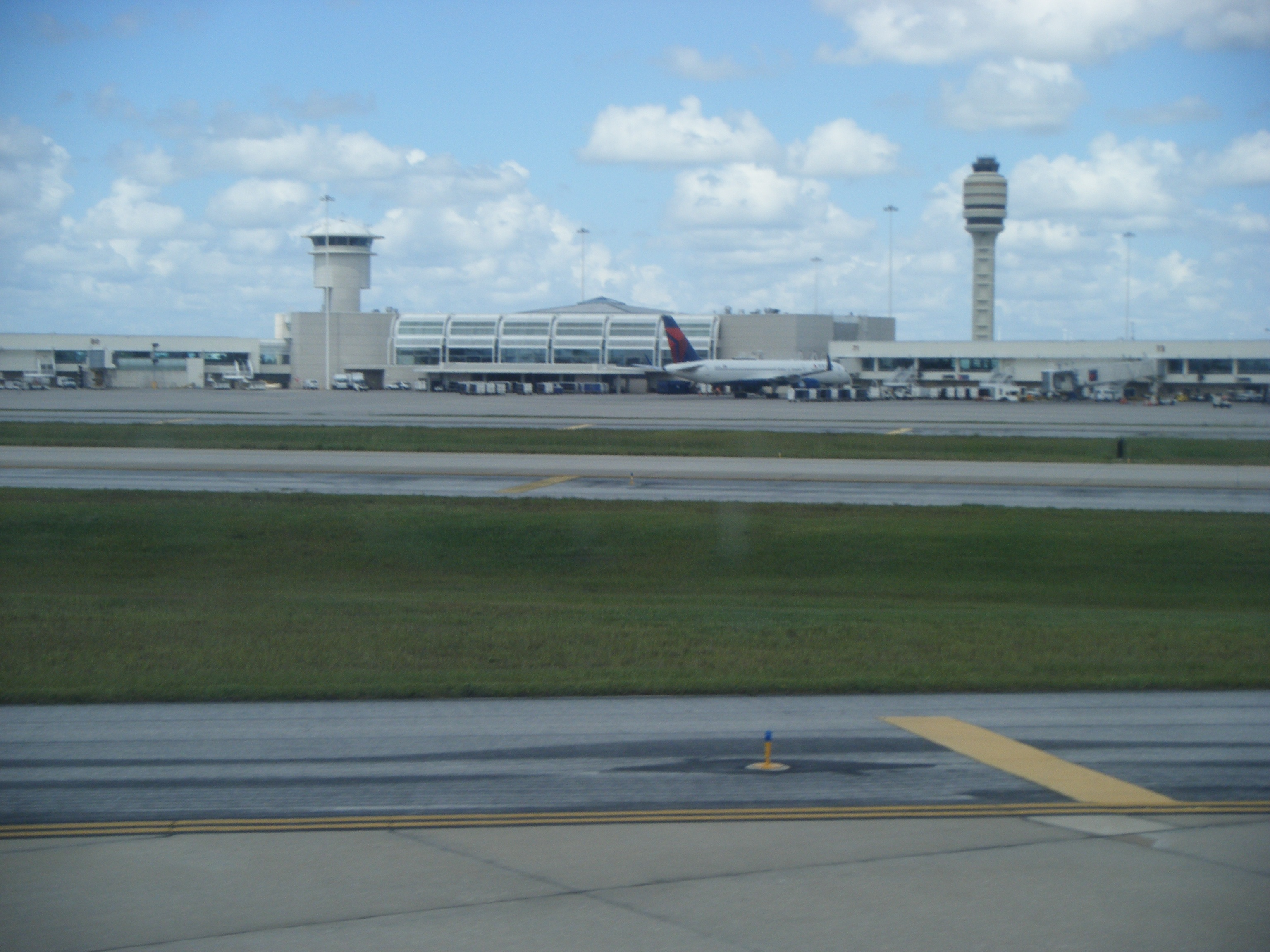
Orlando International Airport is the busiest airport in the state with 44.6 million total passengers traveled in 2017.

This list contains the following information:

- **City served** – The city generally associated with the airport, as per the airport's master record with the Federal Aviation Administration. This is not always the actual location since some airports are located in smaller towns outside of the city they serve. It is not meant to be a complete list of cities served, which can be found in or added to each airport's Wikipedia article.
- **FAA** – The location identifier assigned by the Federal Aviation Administration (FAA). These are linked to each airport's page at the Florida Department of Transportation Continuing Florida Aviation System Planning Process (CFASPP) website.
- **IATA** – The airport code assigned by the International Air Transport Association (IATA). Those that do not match the FAA code are shown in bold.
- **ICAO** – The location indicator assigned by the International Civil Aviation Organization (ICAO).
- **Airport name** – The official airport name. Those shown in **bold** indicate the airport has scheduled passenger service on commercial airlines.
- **Role** – One of four FAA airport categories, as per the 2023–2027 National Plan of Integrated Airport Systems (NPIAS) report released September 2022:
  - P-s: Commercial service – primary are publicly owned airports that receive scheduled passenger service and have more than 10,000 passenger boardings (enplanements) each year. Each primary airport is sub-classified by the FAA as one of the following four "hub" types (s):
    - L: Large hub that accounts for at least 1% of total U.S. passenger enplanements.
    - M: Medium hub that accounts for between 0.25% and 1% of total U.S. passenger enplanements.
    - S: Small hub that accounts for between 0.05% and 0.25% of total U.S. passenger enplanements.
    - N: Nonhub that accounts for less than 0.05% of total U.S. passenger enplanements, but more than 10,000 annual enplanements.
  - CS: Commercial service – nonprimary are publicly owned airports that receive scheduled passenger service and have at least 2,500 passenger boardings each year.
  - R: Reliever airports are designated by the FAA to relieve congestion at a large commercial service airport and to provide more general aviation access to the overall community.
  - GA: General aviation airports are the largest single group of airports in the U.S. airport system. They are public-use airports that do not have scheduled service or have scheduled service with less than 2,500 passenger boardings each year.
- **Enplanements** – The number of enplanements (commercial passenger boardings) that occurred at the airport in calendar year 2024, as per FAA records released 2025.

| City served | FAA | IATA | ICAO | Airport name | Role | Enplanements (2024) |
|---|---|---|---|---|---|---|
| | | | | **Commercial service – primary airports** | | |
| Daytona Beach | DAB | DAB | KDAB | **Daytona Beach International Airport** | P-N | 337,763 |
| Fort Lauderdale | FLL | FLL | KFLL | **Fort Lauderdale–Hollywood International Airport** | P-L | 17,096,131 |
| Fort Lauderdale | FXE | FXE | KFXE | **Fort Lauderdale Executive Airport** | P-N | 10,493 |
| Fort Myers | RSW | RSW | KRSW | **Southwest Florida International Airport** | P-M | 5,425,293 |
| Fort Walton Beach | VPS | VPS | KVPS | **Destin–Fort Walton Beach Airport** / Eglin Air Force Base | P-S | 1,164,880 |
| Gainesville | GNV | GNV | KGNV | **Gainesville Regional Airport** | P-N | 290,563 |
| Jacksonville | JAX | JAX | KJAX | **Jacksonville International Airport** | P-M | 3,749,791 |
| Key West | EYW | EYW | KEYW | **Key West International Airport** | P-S | 740,762 |
| Melbourne | MLB | MLB | KMLB | **Melbourne Orlando International Airport** | P-N | 348,283 |
| Miami | MIA | MIA | KMIA | **Miami International Airport** | P-L | 26,588,002 |
| Orlando | MCO | MCO | KMCO | **Orlando International Airport** | P-L | 27,859,783 |
| Panama City | ECP | ECP | KECP | **Northwest Florida Beaches International Airport** | P-S | 918,470 |
| Pensacola | PNS | PNS | KPNS | **Pensacola International Airport** | P-S | 1,528,204 |
| Punta Gorda | PGD | PGD | KPGD | **Punta Gorda Airport** | P-S | 957,136 |
| Sanford | SFB | SFB | KSFB | **Orlando Sanford International Airport** | P-S | 1,412,954 |
| Sarasota | SRQ | SRQ | KSRQ | **Sarasota–Bradenton International Airport** | P-S | 2,112,417 |
| St. Petersburg | PIE | PIE | KPIE | **St. Pete–Clearwater International Airport** | P-S | 1,228,048 |
| Tallahassee | TLH | TLH | KTLH | **Tallahassee International Airport** | P-N | 469,318 |
| Tampa | TPA | TPA | KTPA | **Tampa International Airport** | P-L | 12,075,591 |
| Vero Beach | VRB | VRB | KVRB | **Vero Beach Regional Airport** | P-N | 88,608 |
| West Palm Beach | DJT | DJT | KDJT | **President Donald J. Trump International Airport** | P-M | 4,127,211 |
| | | | | **Commercial service – nonprimary airports** | | |
| | | | | **Reliever airports** | | |
| Boca Raton | BCT | BCT | KBCT | Boca Raton Airport | R | 5,352 |
| Clearwater | CLW | CLW | KCLW | Clearwater Air Park | R | 20 |
| Fort Myers | FMY | FMY | KFMY | Page Field | R | 189 |
| Hollywood | HWO | HWO | KHWO | North Perry Airport | R | 6 |
| Jacksonville | CRG | CRG | KCRG | Jacksonville Executive at Craig Airport (was Craig Municipal Airport) | R | 319 |
| Jacksonville | HEG | | KHEG | Herlong Recreational Airport (was Herlong Airport) | R | 6 |
| Kissimmee | ISM | ISM | KISM | Kissimmee Gateway Airport | R | 188 |
| Lakeland | LAL | LAL | KLAL | **Lakeland Linder International Airport** | R | 24,185 |
| Miami | TMB | TMB | KTMB | Miami Executive Airport | R | 329 |
| Miami | OPF | OPF | KOPF | **Miami-Opa Locka Executive Airport** (was Opa-locka Airport) | R | 15,771 |
| Orlando | ORL | ORL | KORL | Orlando Executive Airport | R | 478 |
| St. Petersburg | SPG | SPG | KSPG | Albert Whitted Airport | R | 97 |
| Tampa | TPF | TPF | KTPF | Peter O. Knight Airport | R | 156 |
| Tampa | VDF | | KVDF | Tampa Executive Airport (was Vandenberg Airport) | R | 31 |
| Venice | VNC | VNC | KVNC | Venice Municipal Airport | R | 157 |
| West Palm Beach | F45 | | | North Palm Beach County General Aviation Airport | R | 205 |
| West Palm Beach / Lantana | LNA | LNA | KLNA | Palm Beach County Park Airport (Lantana Airport) | R | 43 |
| | | | | **General aviation airports** | | |
| Apalachicola | AAF | AAF | KAAF | Apalachicola Regional Airport-Cleve Randolph Field | GA | 17 |
| Arcadia | X06 | | | Arcadia Municipal Airport | GA | 0 |
| Avon Park | AVO | AVO | KAVO | Avon Park Executive Airport | GA | 6 |
| Bartow | BOW | BOW | KBOW | Bartow Executive Airport | GA | 24 |
| Belle Glade | X10 | | | Belle Glade State Municipal Airport | GA | 0 |
| Blountstown | F95 | | | Calhoun County Airport | GA | 0 |
| Bonifay | 1J0 | | | Tri-County Airport | GA | 0 |
| Brooksville | BKV | | KBKV | Brooksville–Tampa Bay Regional Airport | GA | 13 |
| Cedar Key | CDK | CDK | KCDK | George T. Lewis Airport | GA | 0 |
| Clewiston | 2IS | | | Airglades Airport | GA | 0 |
| Crestview | CEW | CEW | KCEW | Bob Sikes Airport | GA | 4 |
| Cross City | CTY | CTY | KCTY | Cross City Airport | GA | 5 |
| Crystal River | CGC | | KCGC | Crystal River Airport-Captain Tom Davis Field | GA | 20 |
| DeFuniak Springs | 54J | | | DeFuniak Springs Airport | GA | 0 |
| DeLand | DED | | KDED | DeLand Municipal Airport (Sidney H. Taylor Field) | GA | 5 |
| Destin | DTS | **DSI** | KDTS | **Destin Executive Airport** | GA | 3,727 |
| Dunnellon | X35 | | | Marion County Airport | GA | 0 |
| Everglades City | X01 | | | Everglades Airpark | GA | 0 |
| Fernandina Beach | FHB | | KFHB | Fernandina Beach Municipal Airport | GA | 31 |
| Fort Pierce | FPR | FPR | KFPR | Treasure Coast International Airport | GA | 228 |
| Grant-Valkaria | X59 | | | Valkaria Airport | GA | 0 |
| Hilliard | 01J | | | Hilliard Airpark | GA | 0 |
| Homestead | X51 | | | Miami Homestead General Aviation Airport | GA | 0 |
| Immokalee | IMM | IMM | KIMM | Immokalee Regional Airport (was Immokalee Airport) | GA | 7 |
| Inverness | INF | | KINF | Inverness Airport | GA | 34 |
| Jacksonville | VQQ | **NZC** | KVQQ | Cecil Airport (was Cecil Field) | GA | 11 |
| Keystone Heights | 42J | | | Keystone Heights Airport (Keystone Airpark) | GA | 0 |
| LaBelle | X14 | | | LaBelle Municipal Airport | GA | 12 |
| Lake City | LCQ | LCQ | KLCQ | Lake City Gateway Airport (was Lake City Municipal) | GA | 0 |
| Lake Wales | X07 | | | Lake Wales Municipal Airport | GA | 8 |
| Leesburg | LEE | LEE | KLEE | Leesburg International Airport | GA | 38 |
| Live Oak | 24J | | | Suwannee County Airport | GA | 0 |
| Marathon | MTH | MTH | KMTH | The Florida Keys Marathon International Airport | GA | 164 |
| Marco Island | MKY | **MRK** | KMKY | Marco Island Executive Airport | GA | 68 |
| Marianna | MAI | | KMAI | Marianna Municipal Airport | GA | 2 |
| Merritt Island | COI | COI | KCOI | Merritt Island Airport | GA | 64 |
| Miami | TNT | TNT | KTNT | Dade-Collier Training and Transition Airport | GA | 0 |
| Miami | X44 | MPB | | Miami Seaplane Base (was Watson Island Int'l SPB) | GA | 114 |
| Milton | 2R4 | | | Peter Prince Field | GA | 0 |
| Naples | APF | APF | KAPF | **Naples Municipal Airport** | GA | 1,285 |
| New Smyrna Beach | EVB | | KEVB | New Smyrna Beach Municipal Airport | GA | 19 |
| Ocala | OCF | OCF | KOCF | Ocala International Airport (Jim Taylor Field) | GA | 157 |
| Okeechobee | OBE | OBE | KOBE | Okeechobee County Airport | GA | 60 |
| Ormond Beach | OMN | | KOMN | Ormond Beach Municipal Airport | GA | 0 |
| Pahokee | PHK | PHK | KPHK | Palm Beach County Glades Airport | GA | 0 |
| Palatka | 28J | | | Palatka Municipal Airport (Lt. Kay Larkin Field) | GA | 1 |
| Palm Coast | FIN | | KFIN | Flagler Executive Airport | GA | 61 |
| Perry | FPY | FPY | KFPY | Perry-Foley Airport | GA | 0 |
| Plant City | PCM | | KPCM | Plant City Airport | GA | 0 |
| Pompano Beach | PMP | PPM | KPMP | Pompano Beach Airpark | GA | 22 |
| Quincy | 2J9 | | | Quincy Municipal Airport | GA | 0 |
| Sebastian | X26 | | | Sebastian Municipal Airport | GA | 0 |
| Sebring | SEF | SEF | KSEF | Sebring Regional Airport | GA | 55 |
| St. Augustine | SGJ | **UST** | KSGJ | Northeast Florida Regional Airport | GA | 242 |
| Stuart | SUA | SUA | KSUA | Witham Field | GA | 706 |
| Titusville | X21 | | | Arthur Dunn Airpark | GA | 0 |
| Titusville | TIX | TIX | KTIX | Space Coast Regional Airport | GA | 33 |
| Umatilla | X23 | | | Umatilla Municipal Airport | GA | 0 |
| Wauchula | CHN | | KCHN | Wauchula Municipal Airport | GA | 3 |
| Williston | X60 | | | Williston Municipal Airport | GA | 0 |
| Winter Haven | GIF | GIF | KGIF | Winter Haven's Gilbert Airport | GA | 8 |
| Zephyrhills | ZPH | ZPH | KZPH | Zephyrhills Municipal Airport | GA | 3 |
| | | | | **Other public-use airports** (not listed in NPIAS) | | |
| Apalachicola | F47 | | | St. George Island Airport | | 34 |
| Apopka | X04 | | | Orlando Apopka Airport | | |
| Archer | 0J8 | | | Flying Ten Airport | | |
| Brooksville / Spring Hill | X05 | | | Pilot Country Airport (Pilot Country Estates) | | |
| Carrabelle | X13 | | | Carrabelle-Thompson Airport | | |
| DeLand | 1J6 | | | Bob Lee Flight Strip | | |
| Englewood | X36 | | | Buchan Airport | | |
| Eustis | X55 | | | Mid-Florida Airport | | |
| Fort Lauderdale | DT1 | | | Downtown Fort Lauderdale Heliport | | |
| Fort Pierce | 1FL | | | Fort Pierce Seaplane Base | | |
| High Springs | 6J8 | | | Oak Tree Landing Airport (was Rudy's Airport) | | |
| Holly Hill | F15 | | | Halifax River Seaplane Base | | |
| Indiantown | X58 | | | Indiantown Airport | | 4 |
| Key Largo | 07FA | OCA | | Ocean Reef Club Airport | | 424 |
| Lake Wales | X25 | | | Chalet Suzanne Air Strip | | |
| Lakeland | X49 | | | South Lakeland Airport | | |
| Navarre | 1J9 | | | Fort Walton Beach Airport | | |
| New Smyrna Beach | X50 | | | Massey Ranch Airpark | | |
| Palmetto | 48X | | | Airport Manatee | | |
| Panacea | 2J0 | | | Wakulla County Airport | | |
| Pensacola | 82J | | | Ferguson Airport | | |
| Pierson | 2J8 | | | Pierson Municipal Airport | | |
| Placida | FA54 | | | Coral Creek Airport | | 48 |
| Port St. Joe | A51 | | | Costin Airport | | |
| Punta Gorda | F13 | | | Shell Creek Airpark | | |
| River Ranch | 2RR | | | River Ranch Resort Airport | | |
| St. Cloud | 3FL | | | St. Cloud Seaplane Base | | |
| Tallahassee / Havana | 68J | | | Tallahassee Commercial Airport (closed indefinitely) | | |
| Tampa | X39 | | | Tampa North Aero Park | | |
| Tavares | FA1 | | | Tavares Seaplane Base | | |
| Vero Beach | X52 | | | New Hibiscus Airpark | | |
| Winter Haven | F57 | | | Jack Browns Seaplane Base | | |
| Zellwood | X61 | | | Bob White Field | | |
| | | | | **Other government/military airports** | | |
| Avon Park | AGR | | KAGR | MacDill AFB Auxiliary Field | | |
| Cocoa Beach | XMR | | KXMR | Cape Canaveral Space Force Station | | |
| Cocoa Beach | COF | COF | KCOF | Patrick Space Force Base | | 423 |
| Crestview | EGI | EGI | KEGI | Duke Field (Eglin AFB Auxiliary Field 3) | | |
| Fort Walton Beach | NKL | | KNKL | NOLF Holley | | |
| Harold | NZX | | KNZX | NOLF Harold | | |
| Homestead | HST | HST | KHST | Homestead Joint Air Reserve Base | | 0 |
| Jacksonville | NIP | NIP | KNIP | NAS Jacksonville (Towers Field) | | 7,968 |
| Jacksonville | NEN | NEN | KNEN | NOLF Whitehouse | | |
| Jay | NSX | | KNSX | NOLF Site X | | |
| Key West | NQX | NQX | KNQX | NAS Key West (Boca Chica Field) | | 419 |
| Mary Esther | HRT | | KHRT | Hurlburt Field | | 340 |
| Mayport | NRB | NRB | KNRB | NS Mayport (Adm. David L. McDonald Field) | | 165 |
| Milton | NSE | NSE | KNSE | NAS Whiting Field – North | | |
| Milton | NDZ | | KNDZ | NAS Whiting Field – South | | |
| Milton | NFJ | | KNFJ | NOLF Choctaw | | |
| Milton | NGS | | KNGS | NOLF Santa Rosa | | |
| Pace | NRQ | | KNRQ | NOLF Spencer | | |
| Panama City | PAM | PAM | KPAM | Tyndall Air Force Base | | 968 |
| Pensacola | NPA | NPA | KNPA | NAS Pensacola (Forrest Sherman Field) | | 0 |
| Pensacola | NUN | NUN | KNUN | NOLF Saufley Field | | |
| Pensacola | | | ~~KNPI~~ | NOLF Site 8 (Closed?) | | |
| Starke / Camp Blanding | 2CB | | | Camp Blanding AAF/National Guard Airport | | |
| Tampa | MCF | MCF | KMCF | MacDill Air Force Base | | 202 |
| Titusville | TTS | | KTTS | NASA Shuttle Landing Facility | | |
| Wallace | NVI | | KNVI | NOLF Pace | | |
| | | | | **Notable private-use airports** | | |
| Chielfland | FA36 | | | White Farms Airpark | | |
| Fort Myers | FL59 | | | Buckingham Field | | |
| Frostproof | 4FL5 | | | Ridge Landing Airpark | | |
| Gardner | FD40 | | | Gardner Airport | | |
| Groveland | 02FA | | | Osborn Airfield | | |
| Hastings | 2FA7 | | | Kathrinstadt Airport | | |
| New Port Richey | FA40 | | | Hidden Lake Airport (Hidden Lake Estates) | | |
| Ocala / Anthony | 17FL | | | Greystone Airport (Jumbolair Aviation Estates) | | |
| Panama City | 75FL | | | Sandy Creek Airpark | | |
| Port Orange | 7FL6 | | | Spruce Creek Airport | | |
| Trenton | 6FL8 | | | Ames Field (was FAA: 8J2 until 2008) | | |
| | | | | **Notable former airports** | | |
| Bushnell | | | | Bushnell Army Airfield (1940-1945) | | |
| DeLand | | | | DeLand Naval Air Station (1942-1946) | | |
| Jacksonville | | | | Imeson Field (1926-1968) (replaced by Jacksonville International Airport) | | |
| Lake Buena Vista | ~~44FD~~ | | | Epcot Center Ultralight Flightpark | | |
| Lake Buena Vista | | ~~DWS~~ | | Walt Disney World Airport | | |
| Miami | | | | All-American Airport (later part of NAS Miami as Masters Field) | | |
| Miami | | | | Miami Municipal Airport (later part of NAS Miami as Miami Municipal Field then became Amelia Earhart Field) | | |
| Miami | ~~X46~~ | | | Opa-locka West Airport (closed 2006) | ~~GA~~ | |
| Miami | | | | Naval Air Station Richmond (closed 1948) | | |
| Odessa | ~~3FD1~~ | | | Tampa Bay Executive Airport (closed 2004) | | |
| Panama City | ~~PFN~~ | ~~PFN~~ | ~~KPFN~~ | Panama City–Bay County International Airport (1938-2010) (replaced by Northwest Florida Beaches International Airport) | ~~P-N~~ | |
| Pensacola | ~~83J~~ | | | Coastal Airport | | |
| Tampa | | | | Drew Field Municipal Airport (1935-1971) (replaced by Tampa International Airport) | | |

== See also ==
- List of Florida World War II Army Airfields
- Wikipedia:WikiProject Aviation/Airline destination lists: North America#Florida
