= X23 (disambiguation) =

X-23 is a superheroine appearing in American comic books published by Marvel Comics.

X23 may also refer to:

- X23 (New York City bus)
- "X23" (X-Men: Evolution), an episode of the television series X-Men: Evolution
- Martin X-23 PRIME, an American experimental lifting body
- Kh-23 (Russian: Х-23), a Soviet anti-ship missile
- TGOJ X23, a Swedish electric multiple unit
- ThinkPad X23, a notebook computer
- Umatilla Municipal Airport, Florida
