= Clearwater Airport =

Clearwater Airport may refer to:

- Clearwater Airport (Alaska) in Clearwater, Alaska, United States (FAA: Z86)
- Clearwater Aerodrome in Clearwater, New Brunswick, Canada (TC: CDJ4)
- Clearwater Air Park in Clearwater, Florida, United States (FAA: CLW)
- St. Petersburg-Clearwater International Airport serving St. Petersburg/Clearwater, Florida, United States (FAA: PIE)
