= KMKY =

KMKY may refer to:

- KMKY (AM), a radio station (1310 AM) licensed to Oakland, California, United States
- KMKY, the ICAO code for Marco Island Airport
- "Knowing Me, Knowing You", a 1977 song by ABBA
- Knowing Me Knowing You with Alan Partridge (radio series), a BBC radio series
- Knowing Me Knowing You with Alan Partridge (TV series), a BBC television series based on the radio show
