= Tallahassee Airport =

Tallahassee Airport may refer to:

- Tallahassee Commercial Airport in Tallahassee, Florida, United States (FAA: 68J)
- Tallahassee International Airport in Tallahassee, Florida, United States (FAA: TLH)
