= Sandy Creek Airpark =

Airport in Florida, U.S.

Coordinates: 30°6′10″N 85°28′51″W

- IATA: none; ICAO: none; FAA LID: 75FL

Summary
- Airport type: Private
- Owner: Sandy Creek Airpark Owners' Association, Inc. (current development); Sandy Creek Airpark, LLC (Phase III)
- Location: Panama City, Florida
- Elevation AMSL: 13 ft / 4 m
- Website: SandyCreekAirpark.org
- Interactive map of Sandy Creek Airpark

Runways
Direction	Length		Surface
Direction	ft	m	Surface
9/27	3,400	1,173	Asphalt

Statistics
- Based aircraft: 20
- Source: Federal Aviation Administration

Sandy Creek Airpark (FAA LID: 75FL) is a private residential airpark located in the East Bay Sector, 10 miles (16 km) southeast of the central business district of Panama City, in Bay County, Florida, United States. This airport has one dusk-to-dawn lighted runway, and a green-white beacon. The facility is used primarily by residents/association members, their tenants and guests, and members of the EAA Chapter 202.

Phase I of Sandy Creek Airpark was completed in 1983, followed by Phase II in 1988. Sandy Creek Airpark will soon develop Phase III. Improvements will include extending the runway, in addition to residential and light commercial development.

Panama City-Bay County International Airport planned to relocate outside the city limits to the West Bay Sector in 2009. Sandy Creek Airpark planned to accommodate the general aviation community of eastern Bay County and western Gulf County (Mexico Beach).

In 2019, the airport was threatened by a 300 acre wildfire.

== Facilities and aircraft ==
Sandy Creek Airpark covers an area of 18 acres (7.3 ha) which contains one runway (9/27) with an asphalt surface measuring 3,400 x 60 ft (1,036 x 18 m). There are 20 aircraft based at this airport: 75% single-engine airplanes and 25% ultralight.

The airport does not have a fixed-base operator.

== Accidents and incidents ==
- On September 5, 1998, an experimental Glasair II RG crashed while attempting a precautionary landing to the Sandy Creek Airpark. The probable cause of the accident was found to be the pilot's failure to maintain a proper descent rate during a precautionary landing following a loss of engine power for undetermined reasons.
- On September 10, 2011, an experimental Thorp T-18 Tiger was damaged when its landing gear struck a culvert while landing on the Sandy Creek Airpark's grass runway.
- On July 11, 2012, a Cessna 170 was substantially damaged during a forced landing after takeoff from Sandy Creek Airpark. The probable cause of the accident was found to be a total loss of engine power due to water contamination of the fuel, the pilot/owner's inadequate preflight inspection of his airplane, and his failure to maintain airplane control after the engine failure.
- On April 18, 2022, a Piper Warrior crashed shortly after takeoff from the Sandy Creek Airpark.

== See also ==
- List of airports in Florida
