= Jorgensen's General Store =

- U.S. National Register of Historic Places
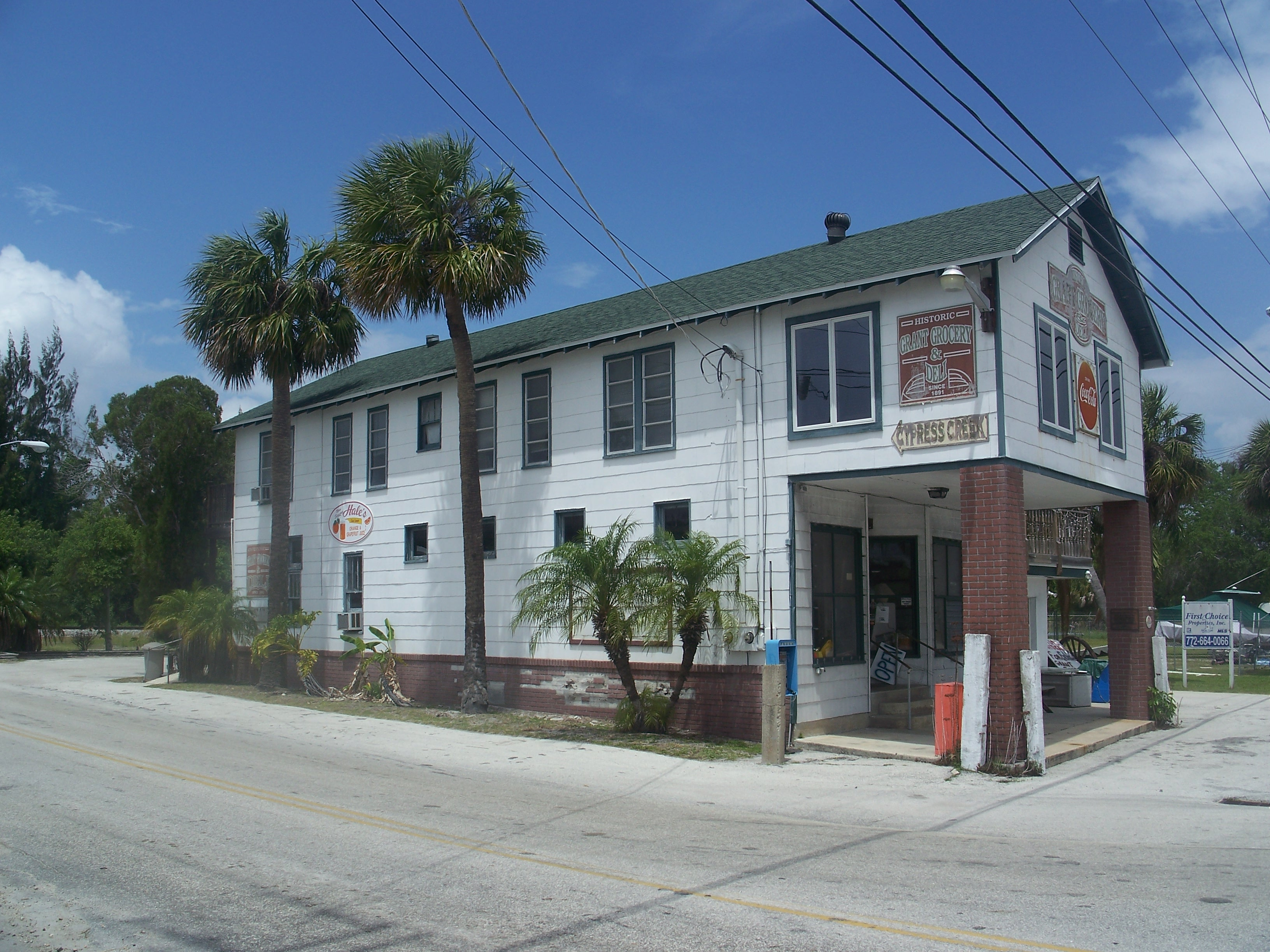

- Location within Florida Location within the United States
- Location: Grant-Valkaria, Florida
- Coordinates: 27°55′44″N 80°31′38″W
- NRHP reference No.: 99000711
- Added to NRHP: June 25, 1999

The Jorgensen's General Store is a historic site in Grant-Valkaria, Florida. It is located at 5390 U.S. 1. It was operated by brothers Atley and Adolph Benson, members of a pioneer family of Grant. On June 25, 1999, it was added to the U.S. National Register of Historic Places.

== References and external links ==
- Brevard County listings at National Register of Historic Places
- Grant General Store at Florida's Office of Cultural and Historical Programs
