= Ocean Reef Club Airport =

- IATA: OCA; ICAO: none; FAA LID: 07FA

Summary
- Airport type: Private use
- Owner: Ocean Reef Club
- Serves: Key Largo, Florida
- Location: Monroe County, Florida
- Elevation AMSL: 8 ft (2.4 m)
- Coordinates: 25°19′13″N 080°16′42″W
- Website: oceanreef.com

Map
- Location of the airport in Florida OCA (the United States)

Runways
Direction	Length		Surface
Direction	ft	m	Surface
5/23	4,456	1,358	Asphalt

Statistics
- Based aircraft: 25
- Source: Federal Aviation Administration

Ocean Reef Club Airport (IATA: OCA, FAA LID: 07FA) is a private-use airport located 19 miles (31 km) northeast of the central business district of the island of Key Largo in Monroe County, Florida, United States. The airport is privately owned.

The airport hosts an annual airshow to showcase vintage aircraft, automobiles, and yachts. Aerobatic displays are presented by the Aeroshell Aerobatic Team in addition to a number of organizations specifically dedicated to presenting certain aircraft.

== Historical airline service ==
The airport had scheduled passenger airline service starting in 1971 operated by Ocean Reef Airways, a division of Montauk Caribbean Airlines. The airline provided on-demand service to Miami International Airport and Fort Lauderdale–Hollywood International Airport along with charter service.

The airline was owned and operated by Bob King and his spouse, who were homeowners in the Ocean Reef Club. The club provided special permission to use their trademarked name as part of their airline name.

The service was so successful that they expanded in 1979, continuing their nonstop flights to and from Miami International Airport with a de Havilland Canada DHC-6 Twin Otter twin-engine commuter turboprop.

== Partnerships ==
The airport has an exclusive partnership with NetJets.

== Aircraft operations ==
Jet fuel is available for purchase on the airport. However, Avgas, which is commonly used in Propeller aircraft, is not available.

Due to the airport's short runway, which is 4,456 feet long, aircraft that can safely operate into and out of 07FA include, but are not limited to:

- Bombardier Challenger 300
- Bombardier Challenger 600 series
- Cessna CitationJet/M2
- Citation CJ4
- Cessna Citation Excel
- Cessna Citation Sovereign
- Cessna Citation Latitude
- Cessna Citation Longitude
- Embraer Phenom 100
- Embraer Phenom 300
- Embraer Legacy 450/500 and Praetor 500/600
- Dassault Falcon 2000
- Dassault Falcon 900
- Dassault Falcon 50
- Gulfstream G200
- Gulfstream G280
- Pilatus PC-12
- Pilatus PC-24

== Facilities and aircraft ==
The Ocean Reef Club has a single runway, designated as Runway 5/23. It measures 4,451 feet long and is paved. Jet-A fuel is available at the airport.

== See also ==
- List of airports in Florida
