= Buchan Airport =

Airport in Englewood, Florida

- IATA: none; ICAO: none; FAA LID: X36

Summary
- Airport type: Public
- Owner/Operator: Sarasota County
- Location: Englewood
- Opened: December 1949
- Elevation AMSL: 15 ft (4.6 m)
- Coordinates: 26°59′24″N 82°22′26″W

Map
- Location in Florida X36 (the United States)

Runways
Direction	Length		Surface
Direction	ft	m	Surface
12/30	2,040	622	Turf
- Source: Federal Aviation Administration

Buchan Airport (FAA LID: X36) is a public airport located in Englewood, Florida, United States, and operated/owned by Sarasota County.

== History ==
Before Buchan Airport was built, Hygeia, a subdivision consisting of approximately 100 acres (40 ha), was planned to be built during the late 1920s. A plat for the subdivision was filed with Sarasota County on April 21, 1925. The subdivision never broke ground due to the end of the Florida land boom of the 1920s.

In April 1949, Sarasota County bought 93 acres (38 ha) of the land for $100 (equivalent to $1,040 in 2024) in back taxes with help from former county commissioner Peter E. Buchan, to build an airport.

The airport helped facilitate aerial spraying for the county's mosquito eradication program.

Today, the airport hosts annual fly-ins with vintage aircraft. Numerous pancake breakfasts are hosted throughout the year. The airport has also been a debris collection sight following both Hurricane Irma and Hurricane Ian.

== Facilities and aircraft ==
The Buchan Airport has one runway, designated as runway 12/30. It measures 2040 x 120 ft (622 x 37 m) and is turf.

The airport does not have a fixed-base operator. No fuel is available.

== Accidents and incidents ==
- On April 6, 2006, an Aero Commander 100 was substantially damaged after an aborted takeoff at the Buchan Airport. The pilot reported that engine performance during preflight checks was normal, but, on the takeoff roll, the airplane was too slow 2/3 down the runway. Though he attempted to abort, the runway's rough, wet, sandy surface impeded normal braking action. The probable cause of the accident was found to be the pilot's failure to abort the takeoff in time to stop on the remaining runway, which resulted in the airplane overrunning the runway.
- On June 7, 2018, an experimental SeaRey aircraft crashed after striking a tree 200 feet from the runway. After an engine check, the airplane departed from Buchan, but it lost engine power just after liftoff. The pilot survived.

== See also ==
- List of airports in Florida
