= Plant City Airport =

- IATA: none; ICAO: KPCM; FAA LID: PCM

Summary
- Airport type: Public
- Owner: Hillsborough County Aviation Authority
- Serves: Plant City, Florida
- Elevation AMSL: 154 ft / 47 m
- Coordinates: 28°00′01″N 082°09′51″W
- Website: www.pcairport.net
- Interactive map of Plant City Airport

Runways
| Direction | Length | | Surface |
| Direction | ft | m | Surface |
|---|---|---|---|
| 10/28 | 3,950 | 1,204 | Asphalt |

Statistics (2017)
- Aircraft operations (year ending 12/12/2017): 47,975
- Based aircraft: 76
- Source: Federal Aviation Administration

Plant City Airport (ICAO: KPCM, FAA LID: PCM) is a public-use airport located two nautical miles (4 km) southwest of the central business district of Plant City in Hillsborough County, Florida, United States. The airport is publicly owned by the Hillsborough County Aviation Authority, which also operates Tampa International Airport. It was formerly known as Plant City Municipal Airport. It supports a 400-acre (1.6 km^{2}) industrial park located about one mile (1.6 km) east of the airport.

Although most U.S. airports use the same three-letter location identifier for the FAA and IATA, this airport is assigned PCM by the FAA but PCM stands for a Mexican airport.

== History ==
Plant City was originally a large cotton center but switched to strawberries which brought it national recognition. It was named for the city's well known railroad tycoon, Henry B. Plant.

The Plant City Municipal Airport was founded in 1948 to ship strawberries. Runway 09/27 was lengthened in 1999 and redesignated 10/28. In 2000, a new terminal was constructed, along with two new hangars (E and F) and a new Jet-A fuel tank.

== Facilities and aircraft ==
Plant City Airport covers an area of 199 acres (81 ha) at an elevation of 154 feet (47 m) above mean sea level. It has one asphalt paved runway designated 10/28 which measures 3,950 x 75 ft (1,204 x 23 m).

For the 12-month period ending December 12, 2017, the airport had 47,975 aircraft operations, an average of 131 per day: 100% general aviation, <1% air taxi and <1% military. At that time there were 76 aircraft based at this airport: 57 single-engine, 13 multi-engine, 1 jet, 4 helicopter, and 1 glider. The local fixed-base operator is Atlas Aviation.

== See also ==
- List of airports in the Tampa Bay area
- List of airports in Florida
