= Ames Field =

- IATA: none; ICAO: none; FAA LID: 6FL8

Summary
- Airport type: Private
- Owner: Bill J. Haynes
- Serves: Trenton, Florida
- Location: Levy County, Florida
- Elevation AMSL: 64 ft (20 m)
- Coordinates: 29°35′15″N 082°52′16″W

Map
- Location of airport in Florida 6FL8 (the United States)

Runways
Direction	Length		Surface
Direction	ft	m	Surface
18/36	2,600	792	Turf

Statistics (2001)
- Aircraft operations: 1,200
- Sources: FAA, FDOT.

Ames Field (FAA LID: 6FL8, formerly 8J2) is a private use airport in Levy County, Florida, United States. It is located three nautical miles (6 km) southwest of the central business district of Trenton, a city in Gilchrist County. It is owned by Bill J. Haynes. It used to be a public use airport owned by Alicia Ames Steele.

== Facilities and aircraft ==
Ames Field covers an area of 70 acres (28 ha) at an elevation of 64 feet (20 m) above mean sea level. It has one runway designated 18/36 with a turf surface measuring 2,600 by 75 feet (792 x 23 m).

For the 12-month period ending August 31, 2001, the airport had 1,200 general aviation aircraft operations, an average of 100 per month.

== See also ==
- List of airports in Florida
