= Okeechobee County Airport =

Airport in Florida, U.S.

Okeechobee County Airport Connors Army Auxiliary Field
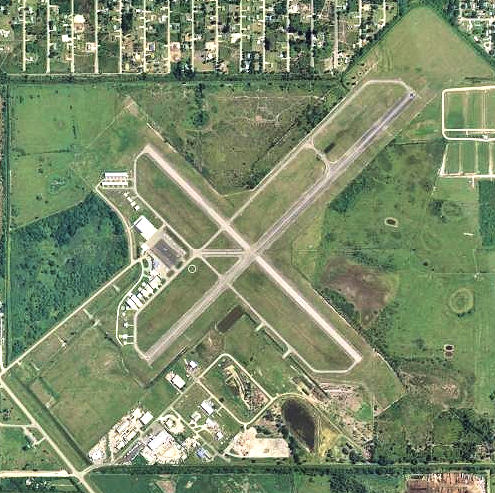
- 2006 USGS airphoto
- IATA: OBE; ICAO: KOBE; FAA LID: OBE

Summary
- Airport type: Public
- Owner: Okeechobee County
- Serves: Okeechobee, Florida
- Location: Unincoroporated Okeechobee County
- Elevation AMSL: 34 ft / 10 m
- Coordinates: 27°15′57.5″N 80°51′04″W
- Website: www.okeechobeecountyfl.gov/departments/airport-industrial-park

Map
- Location of Okeechobee County Airport OBE (the United States)

Runways
Direction	Length		Surface
Direction	ft	m	Surface
5/23	5,000	1,524	Asphalt
14/32	4,000	1,219	Asphalt

Okeechobee County Airport (IATA: OBE, ICAO: KOBE, FAA LID: OBE) is a general aviation airport located 3 mi (4.82 km) northwest of Okeechobee, in unincorporated Okeechobee County, Florida.

== History ==
The airport was opened in April 1940 as Conners Field. It was leased by the United States Army Air Corps in 1941 as an auxiliary training field, and used by the Hendricks Army Airfield B-17 Flying Fortress training school near Sebring during World War II. The runways and other facilities were improved by the Army, and the airport was used for training touch-and-go landings landings and emergencies. No permanent military units or personnel were assigned. With the end of the war in 1945, the site was returned for civil use.

Since then, Okeechobee has been operated as a general aviation airport. The Florida Division of Forestry has a base at the airport.

== Facilities and aircraft ==
The airport has two runways, both paved with asphalt. Runway 5/23 measures 5,000 ft x 100 ft (1524 x 30 m); runway 14/32 measures 4001 x 75 ft (1220 x 23 m). Both runways have full-length parallel taxiways.

The airport has a fixed-base operator that sells fuel–both avgas and jet fuel–and offers it 24 hours per day at the self service fuel farm. Full service fuel is available 7 days a week form 8am-5pm EST. Services such as an overnight hangar and a courtesy van, available during hours of operation, are available; there are also amenities such as internet and a crew lounge with free coffee and water.

Local pilots and aircraft owners have access to t-hangars and box hangars.

== Accidents and incidents ==
- On February 23, 2025, the left landing gear of a CubCrafters Carbon Cub FX-3, a two-seat homebuilt aircraft, collapsed while it was landing at Okeechobee County Airport.

== See also ==
- Florida World War II Army Airfields
- List of airports in Florida
