= Mid-Florida Airport =

Public use airport in Eustis, Florida

- IATA: none; ICAO: none; FAA LID: X55

Summary
- Owner/Operator: MC Group Enterprises, INC
- Serves: Eustis, Florida
- Time zone: UTC−05:00 (-5)
  - Summer (DST): UTC−04:00 (-4)
- Elevation AMSL: 167 ft / 51 m
- Coordinates: 28°50′36″N 081°37′48″W
- Interactive map of Mid-Florida Airport

Runways
Direction	Length		Surface
Direction	ft	m	Surface
18/36	3,200	80	Turf

Statistics (2018)
- Aircraft movements: 21,170

The Mid-Florida Airport (FAA LID: X55) is a privately owned, public use airport located 3 miles east of Eustis, Florida, United States. The airport sits on 30 acres, at an elevation of 167 feet.

The airport is home to flying clubs that provide access to aircraft such as hang gliders, light sport aircraft, and traditional fixed-wing airplanes.

== Facilities and aircraft ==
The airport has one runway. Designated as runway 18/36, the runway measures 3200 x 80 ft (975 x 24 m) and is made of turf. For the 12-month period ending September 18, 2018, the airport had 21,170 aircraft operations, an average of 58 per day. It was 96% general aviation, 5% air taxi, and <1% military. For the same time period, 63 aircraft were based at the airport, all airplanes: 59 single-engine and 4 multi-engine.

The airport does not have a fixed-base operator, and no fuel is available at the airport.

In 2000, airport officials announced they would construct up to 17 hangars to house more aircraft.

== Accidents and incidents ==
- On July 24, 1995, a Beechcraft Bonanza crashed after takeoff from the Mid-Florida Airport. The pilot, who had just arrived at the airport to pick up a passenger en route to the Experimental Aircraft Association AirVenture Airshow in Oshkosh, Wisconsin, told witnesses that the plane's center of gravity was excessively aft and that he had used a lot of forward trim to maintain level flight; he and his passenger subsequently loaded the plane quickly and without recalculating weight and balance. The plane's takeoff roll was reported to be longer than normal. After climbing to 300 feet, the aircraft began a right turn before entering a steepening left bank, at which point it entered a steep descent and crashed into a lake. The probable cause of the accident was found to be the pilot's inadequate preflight planning/preparation by allowing the airplane's weight and balance to be exceeded, and his failure to maintain control of the airplane while turning after takeoff, which resulted in an inadvertent stall.
- On July 15, 1997, a glider crashed near the Mid-Florida Airport. The right wing broke off the glider and the pilot lost control.
- On November 13, 2004, a Joseph R. Sirgo Aquilla-built experimental amateur-build aircraft impacted a hangar during initial takeoff/climb from Mid-Florida Airport. An FAA inspector found that the passenger sitting in the aircraft's front seat froze on the controls and the pilot could not overpower them. The pilot tried adding full power to climb away from the hangar, but he was unable to avoid impacting it. The probable cause of the accident was found to be the passenger's control interference, which resulted in a loss of control, and the airplane impacting a hangar during takeoff/initial climb.
- On March 12, 2013, a Trick Trikes Eagle encountered turbulence on final, veered left, and crashed into trees while on approach to the runway. The probable cause of the accident was found to be the pilot's failure to maintain control of the weight-shift aircraft during the final approach to land.
- On October 3, 2013, an Airborne Edge Executive landed hard during a forced landing after takeoff from Mid-Florida Airport. The student pilot had just been signed off to solo. On his first landing, the engine quit 350 feet above the ground. The pilot attempted to turn back towards the airport to line up with the runway, but he over-flared, landed hard, bounced 20 feet into the air, cleared a 3 foot tall fence, then touched down and came to rest.
- On October 26, 2014, a Solo Wings Aquilla crashed on approach to Mid-Florida Airport. The aircraft encountered violent turbulence on final, and the pilot subsequently lost control. The probable cause of the crash was found to be the pilot's failure to maintain aircraft control during the final approach in turbulent conditions, which resulted in a collision with water.
- On January 2, 2015, a Dayton A Babcock Storm aircraft crashed during its landing roll at the Mid-Florida Airport. During landing in a formation flight, the accident aircraft encountered the "prop wash" of the preceding aircraft, which resulted in an uncommanded right bank. The pilot attempted to counteract the turn by applying a left banking control input, but the left main landing gear and nose landing gear impacted the ground, and further aggravated the turn. The nose landing gear then collapsed and dug into the soft turf runway, and the aircraft overturned to the right, where it came to rest on its right side. The probable cause of the accident was found to be the pilot's failure to maintain adequate spacing from the preceding aircraft during a formation landing, resulting in an inadvertent "prop wash" encounter, loss of control, and impact with terrain.
- On February 25, 2018, an Airborne Windsports Edge crashed while on approach to Mid-Florida Airport. The pilot had just purchased the aircraft and spent the day before the crash assembling it. While in the airport traffic pattern on the accident flight, the aircraft overshot its turns to the base and final legs. During final approach, the aircraft made a hard left turn towards the runway, and its wings began to rock. The right wing then "went down," the engine was heard accelerating, and the trike impacted the ground.

== See also ==
- List of airports in Florida
