= Bensen House =

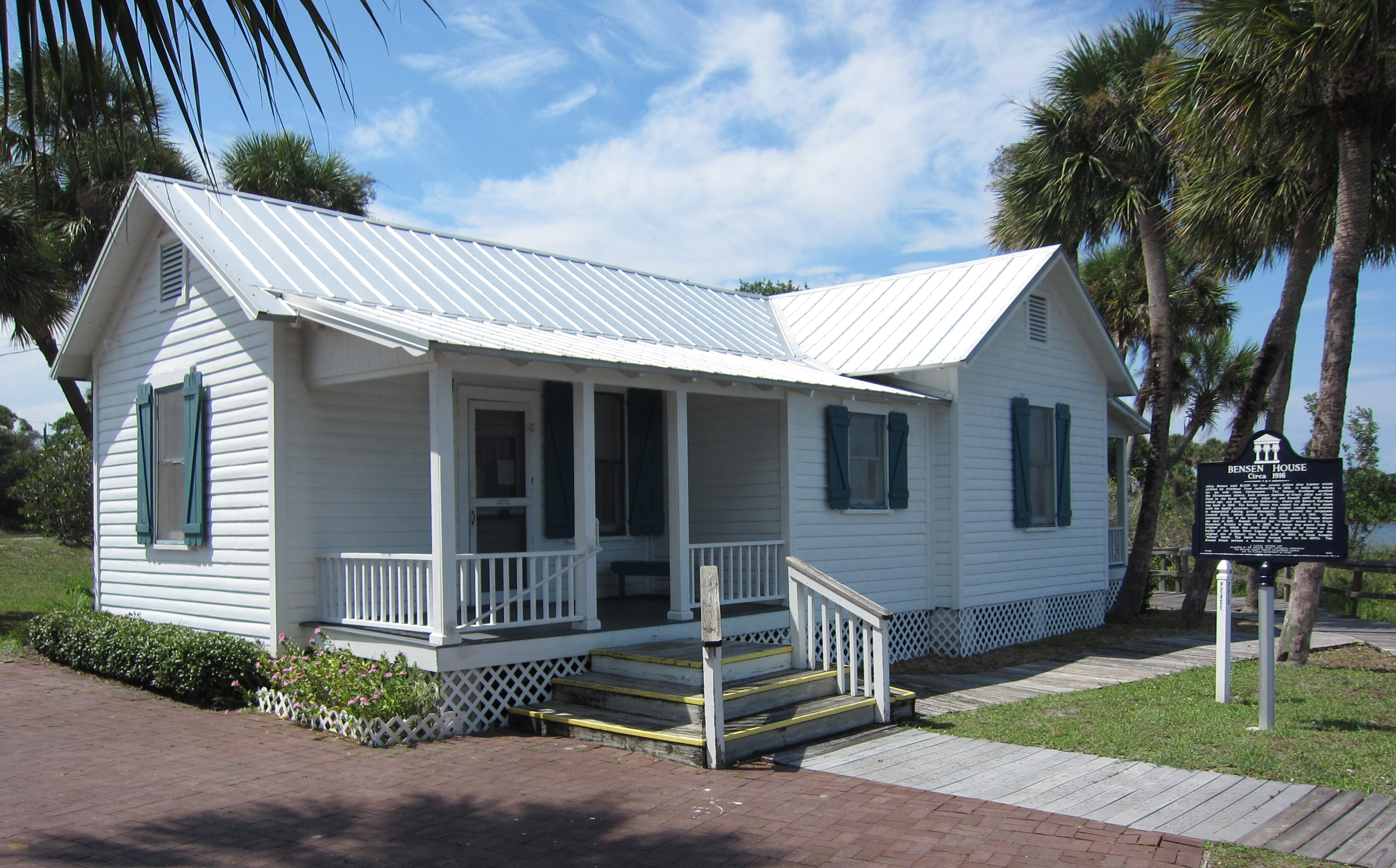
- Interactive map of the Bensen House area

General information
- Type: House
- Architectural style: Florida Cracker
- Location: 5795 U.S. Route 1 Grant, Florida
- Coordinates: 27°55′22″N 80°31′17″W
- Construction started: 1916
- Governing body: Grant Historical Society

Technical details
- Structural system: Wood

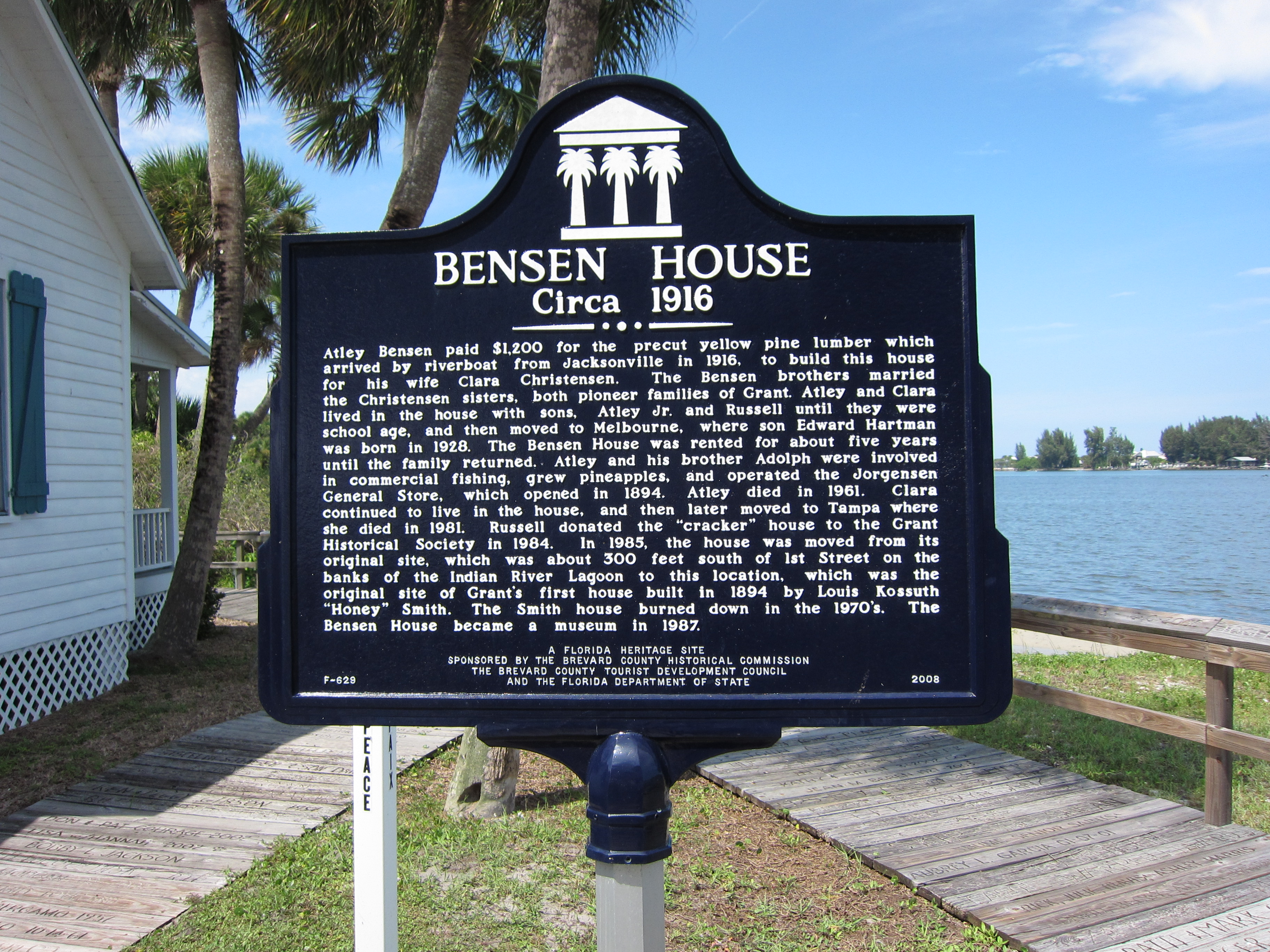
Bensen House historical marker

The Bensen House, sometimes called the 1916 House or the Grant Historical House, is a historic U.S. home located at 5795 U.S. Route 1, Grant, Florida. The house was built in 1916 by Atley Bensen for his wife Clara. It now serves as a house museum and the home for the Grant Historical Society.
