= 76th Flying Training Wing (U.S. Army Air Forces) =

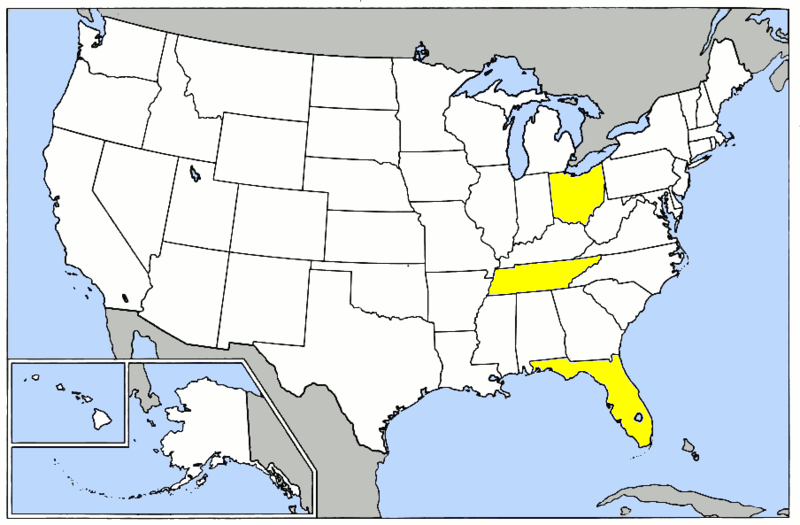
- Locations of airfields controlled by the 76th Flying Training Wing
- Active: 1943–1946
- Country: United States
- Branch: United States Army Air Forces
- Type: Command and Control
- Role: Training
- Part of: Army Air Forces Training Command
- Engagements: World War II: World War II American Theater

The 76th Flying Training Wing was a wing of the United States Army Air Forces. It was assigned to the Army Air Forces Flying Training Command, and was stationed from 1943–46 at Smyrna Army Airfield, Tennessee.

There is no lineage link between the United States Air Force 76th Maintenance Wing, established on 5 February 1942 as the 76th Observation Group at MacDill Field, Florida and the 76th FTW of the Second World War.

== History ==
The wing was a heavy bomber training wing of Eastern Flying Training Command. Its schools provided four-engine heavy bomber transition training for experienced pilots who were moving from single and two-engine aircraft to the B-17 or B-24 Liberator heavy bombers. Also after 1944, most pilots were learning on B-17/B-24s for eventual transition to B-29 Superfortress training under Second Air Force.

As training requirements changed during the war, schools were activated and inactivated or transferred to meet those requirements.

=== Lineage ===
- Established as 76th Flying Training Wing, on 14 August 1943

Activated on 25 August 1943
Disbanded on 16 June 1946.

=== Assignments ===
- Army Air Forces Eastern Flying Training Command, 25 August 1943
- AAF Western Flying Training Command, 15 December 1945 – 16 June 1946.

=== Training aircraft ===
The schools of the wing flew primarily B-17D/E/F Flying Fortresses. Some B-17Gs were flown after June 1944 when Second Air Force B-17 training ended. Some B-24D Liberators were also used

=== Assigned pilot schools ===
Hendricks Army Airfield, Sebring, Florida
AAF Pilot School (Specialized, 4-Engine)
43d Pilot Transition Training (4-Engine)
Opened: February 1942, Closed: December 1945 (B-17)
Transition training for experienced single or two-engine pilots; primarily used for training B-29 Superfortress pilots after mid-1944

Lockbourne Army Airbase, Columbus, Ohio
AAF Pilot School (Specialized, 4-Engine)
44th Pilot Transition Training (4-Engine)
Opened: January 1943, Closed: February 1945 (B-17)
Transition training for experienced single or two-engine pilots; WASP 4-engine school; primarily used for training B-29 Superfortress pilots after mid-1944; Later USAF Lockborune/Rickenbacker AFB, Now OH Air National Guard

Smyrna Army Airfield, Smyrna, Tennessee
AAF Pilot School (Specialized, 4-Engine)
46th Pilot Transition Training (4-Engine)
Opened: January 1942, Closed: October 1945 (B-17, B-24)
Transition training for experienced single or two-engine pilots; primarily used for training B-29 Superfortress pilots after mid-1944; later USAF Smyrna/Stewart Air Force Base, closed 1971

== See also ==
- Other Eastern Flying Training Command Flight Training Wings:

27th Flying Training Wing (World War II) Basic Flight Training
28th Flying Training Wing (World War II) Advanced Flight Training, Single Engine
29th Flying Training Wing (World War II) Primary Flight Training
30th Flying Training Wing (World War II) Advanced Flight Training, Two Engine
74th Flying Training Wing (World War II) Classification/Preflight/Specialized/Navigation
75th Flying Training Wing (World War II) Gunnery
