= Hidden Lake Airport =

Coordinates: 28°16′57″N 082°38′44″W

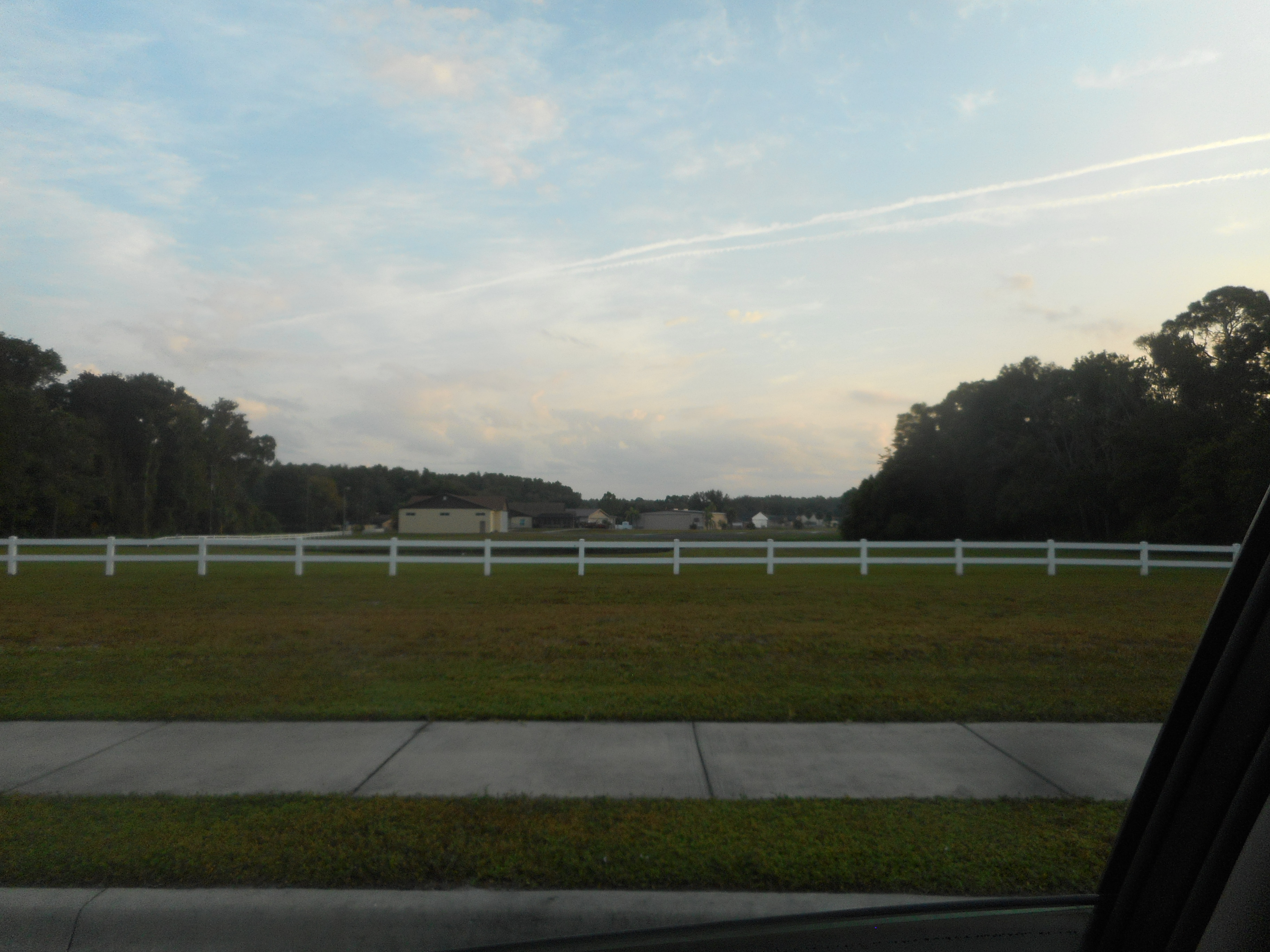
- IATA: none; ICAO: none; FAA LID: FA40

Summary
- Airport type: Private
- Owner: Airport Investors, Inc.
- Location: New Port Richey, Florida
- Elevation AMSL: 30 ft (9.1 m)
- Website: www.hiddenlakeairport.com
- Interactive map of Hidden Lake Airport

Runways
| Direction | Length | | Surface |
| Direction | ft | m | Surface |
|---|---|---|---|
| 5/23 | 4,050 | 1,234 | Asphalt |

Statistics
- Based aircraft: 80
- Source: Federal Aviation Administration

Hidden Lake Airport (FAA LID: FA40) is a private-use airport located four miles (6 km) northeast of the central business district of New Port Richey, a city in Pasco County, Florida, United States. It is privately owned by Airport Investors. The airport is primarily available for the 150 residential homes located in the fly-in community of Hidden Lake Estates. However, the airport can be used at any time for emergency landings.

The entirety of the Hidden Lake Estates and Airport is a licensed airport community with the Florida Department of Transportation. All streets on the east side of the runway are officially taxiways, therefore aircraft have the right-of-way.

== Facilities and aircraft ==
Hidden Lake Airport covers an area of 42 acres (17 ha) which contains one asphalt paved runway (5/23) measuring 4,425 x 50 ft. There are 80 aircraft based at this airport: 75 single-engine and 5 multi-engine. Unfamiliar pilots are encouraged to review the informational videos on the Hidden Lake Airport Website.

== See also ==
- List of airports in Florida
