= Kathrinstadt Airport =

Private airport in Florida, U.S.

Coordinates: 29°38′07″N 081°27′55″W

- IATA: none; ICAO: none; FAA LID: 2FA7

Summary
- Airport type: Private
- Owner: Jack & Kate Russell
- Operator: Aeromarine West Indies Airways Corp.
- Serves: None (private maintenance field)
- Location: 10460 Turpin Ave. Hastings, Florida 32145
- Elevation AMSL: 10 ft (3.0 m)
- Website: Airport
- Interactive map of Kathrinstadt Airport

Runways
Direction	Length		Surface
Direction	ft	m	Surface
9/27	700	230	Turf
- Source: Federal Aviation Administration

Kathrinstadt Airport (FAA LID: 2FA7) is a private-use airport located eight miles (13 km) southeast of the central business district of Hastings, a town in St. Johns County, Florida, United States. It is approximately 25 miles southwest of St. Augustine.

The airport is modeled after a 1920s-1930s style aerodrome.

It is the maintenance airfield for Aeromarine West Indies Airways, a scheduled passenger seaplane service and aviation center.

== Facilities and aircraft ==
Kathrinstadt Airport has one runway (9/27) with a grass surface measuring 700 ft × 120 ft (213 m × 37 m). The runway can only be used by STOL aircraft and ultralights. Access is restricted to aircraft which receive landing clearance from the airport manager. The airport is attended 7 days a week, 24 hours a day. There is one maintenance hangar located at the center/north side of the runways.

== See also ==
- List of airports in Florida
