= Valkaria Airport =

Coordinates: 27°57′39.1″N 080°33′30.0″W

- IATA: none; ICAO: none; FAA LID: X59

Summary
- Airport type: Public use
- Owner: Brevard County
- Operator: Steve Borowski
- Serves: Grant-Valkaria, Florida
- Location: Brevard County, Florida
- Elevation AMSL: 26 ft / 8 m
- Interactive map of Valkaria Airport

Runways
Direction	Length		Surface
Direction	ft	m	Surface
10/28	4,000	1,219	Asphalt
14/32	4,000	1,219	Asphalt

Statistics (2001)
- Aircraft operations: 14,404
- Based aircraft: 49
- Source: Federal Aviation Administration

Valkaria Airport (FAA LID: X59) is a public-use airport located 1 mile (1.6 km) west of the central business district of the city of Grant-Valkaria in Brevard County, Florida, United States. The airport is publicly owned.

The airport was originally constructed by the U.S. Navy during World War II as Naval Outlying Landing Field Valkaria (NOLF Valkaria), an auxiliary airfield to Naval Air Station Melbourne, now Melbourne International Airport. NOLF Valkaria was closed in late 1945 and did not reopen for flight operations until 1959. During the 1950s, 1960s and 1970s, the site was used as a Missile Trajectory Measurement (MISTRAM) station by the U.S. Air Force and NASA in support of launch operations at Cape Canaveral Air Force Station and Kennedy Space Center.

In 1959, the United States Department of Defense and the General Services Administration conveyed that part of the Valkaria facility not dedicated to MISTRAM to the county government of Brevard County, Florida for use as a public airport.

The Valkaria Airport also has the Space Coast Drone Test Center.

== See also ==
- List of airports in Florida
