= Orlando Apopka Airport =

Privately owned public use airport in Orange County, Florida, US

- IATA: none; ICAO: none; FAA LID: X04

Summary
- Airport type: Public use
- Owner/Operator: Orlando Apopka Airport Owners Association
- Serves: Orlando, Florida
- Location: Apopka, Florida
- Elevation AMSL: 150 ft / 46 m
- Coordinates: 28°42′26″N 081°34′54″W
- Website: http://flx04.org
- Interactive map of Orlando Apopka Airport

Runways
Direction	Length		Surface
Direction	ft	m	Surface
15/33	3,987	1,215	Asphalt

Statistics (2018)
- Aircraft operations (year ending 8/17/2018): 33,150
- Based aircraft: 249
- Source: Federal Aviation Administration

Orlando Apopka Airport (FAA LID: X04) is a privately owned, uncontrolled, public-use airport located four nautical miles (7 km) northwest of the central business district of Apopka, in Orange County, Florida, United States. It was previously known as Orlando Country Airport and McDonald Airport prior to that, the latter due its proximity to the unincorporated community of McDonald, Florida.

== Facilities and aircraft ==
Orlando Apopka Airport covers an area of 80 acres (32 ha) at an elevation of 150 feet (46 m) above mean sea level. It has one asphalt paved runway designated 15/33 which measures 3,987 by 60 feet (1,215 x 18 m). Runway 15 has a displaced threshold of 943 feet, leaving an available landing distance for that runway of 3,044 feet.

The common areas of the airport are maintained by the OAA Owners Association, but the hangars and lots are individually owned.

For the 12-month period ending August 17, 2018, the airport had 33,150 aircraft operations, an average of 91 per day, 99% general aviation and <1% air taxi. At that time there were 249 aircraft based at this airport: 196 single-engine, 32 multi-engine, 3 jet, 4 helicopters, 2 glider, and 12 ultra-light.

== See also ==
- List of airports in Florida
