= Hendricks Army Airfield =

World War II era US airbase

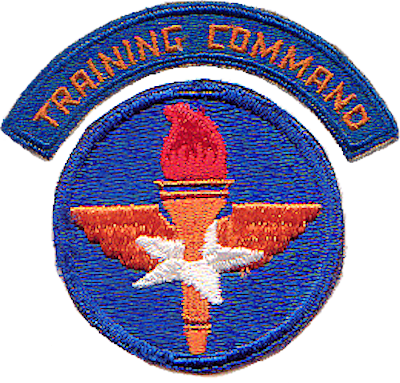
Hendricks Army Airfield
- Part of Army Air Forces Training Command
- Located near: Sebring, Florida
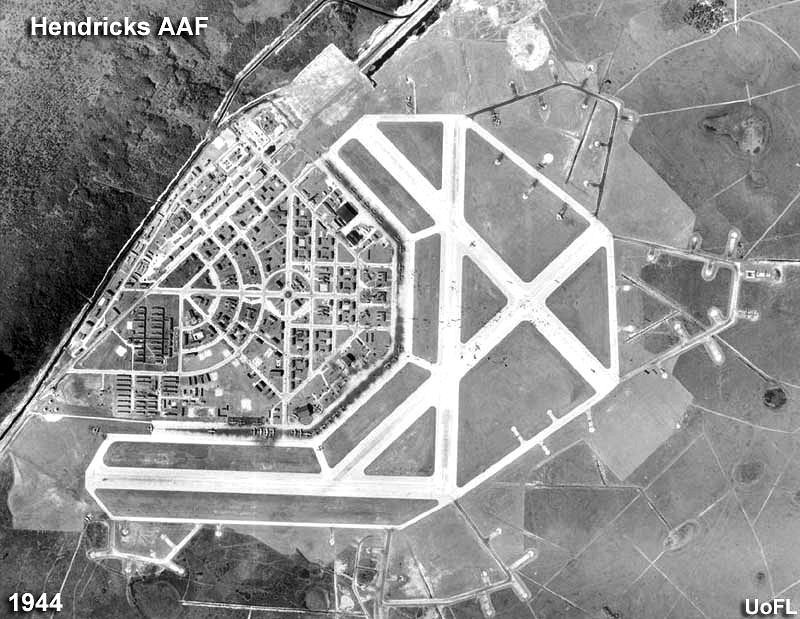
- Hendricks Army Airfield – 1944

Location
- Location within Florida
- Coordinates: 27°27′23″N 081°20′33″W

Site history
- In use: 1941–1945

Hendricks Army Airfield was a World War II United States Army Air Forces base located 6.6 miles east-southeast of Sebring, Florida.

== History ==
Hendricks Army Airfield is a former United States Army Air Forces base. It was used during World War II as a Heavy Bomber Training School for B-17 Flying Fortress and B-24 Liberator pilots. It was under the jurisdiction of the 76th Flying Training Wing (Specialized 4-Engine), Smyrna Army Airfield, Tennessee.

The base was named Hendricks Field in honor of First Lieutenant Laird Woodruff Hendricks, Jr. A native Floridian, Hendricks was born in Ocala, Florida, grew up in Jacksonville, Florida and graduated from the United States Military Academy at West Point, New York in 1939. Commissioned into the Army Air Corps, Hendricks completed flight training and received his aeronautical rating as an Army pilot. Lieutenant Hendricks was killed in a B-17C (RAF Fortress I) crash near RAF Polebrook, England on 28 July 1941, just three days after he arrived there to train Royal Air Force pilots.

=== Origins ===
The airfield's origins begin in 1940 when Sebring officials and citizens contacted their Florida congressional delegation to see about getting an Army base in the area. In the summer of 1940, and in early 1941, a group of Army Air Corps officers surveyed the area. On June 12, 1941, Congressman J. Hardin Peterson advised that an area of 9,200 acres (3,700 ha) of woodland had been approved for a basic flying school. The City of Sebring purchased the land and leased it to the government at $1 per year for 99 years.

On July 20, 1941 construction began with Cleary Brothers of West Palm Beach as the General Contractor and Colonel A. H. Bond of the United States Army Corps of Engineers in charge. Major Leonard H. Rodieck, who had designed the base, provided oversight for the Army Air Corps. A railroad spur was extended to the installation, followed by construction of the air base facilities and infrastructure. In time, the base became a self-supporting city with paved streets, water and sewage systems, frame buildings, two-story barracks, and four concrete runways, each 300 feet (91 m) wide by 5,000 feet (1,500 m) long. The first soldiers arrived on September 5, 1941 and initially occupied tents on the shore of Lake Jackson on the edge of Sebring until they moved onto the base in December when the first barracks were completed.

While under construction, the base was known, unofficially, as Kehoe Field, either by joke or by error. The base achieved its initial operating capability and was placed under command of Major Roderick on June 26, 1941. Following the attack on Pearl Harbor, the base's status was upgraded to full operational capability and placed under the command of Colonel Carl B. McDaniel. In addition to the main base, several sub-bases and auxiliaries were constructed to support the training program:

- Conners Auxiliary Field 27°15′57.5″N 80°51′04″W
- Immokalee Army Airfield 26°25′57″N 081°24′10″W

At the close of 1941, the initial construction program was completed and the contractors were preparing to move their equipment elsewhere when an order came to expand the building program. Then it was revealed that the field would not be used for basic flight training. It was to become the first Combat Crew Training School in the United States, for heavy bombers. The School was activated pursuant to letter AG 680 (C-19-41), June 23, 1941, Subject: Establishment of Air Schools, effective 26 June 1941, and designated Air Corps Training Center, Maxwell Field, Alabama and given an exempted status and placed under the control of Chief of Air Corps.

=== Heavy bomber training ===
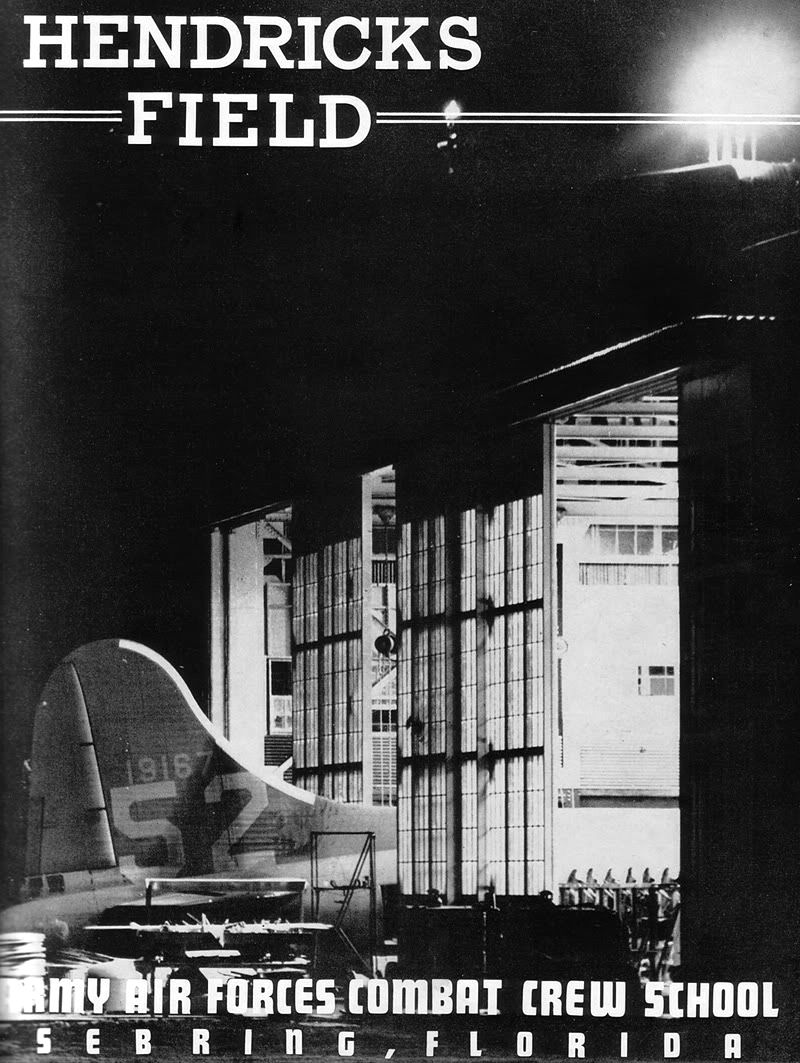
1942 Yearbook. Tail of Boeing B-17E Flying Fortress, AAF Ser. No. 41-9167, visible.

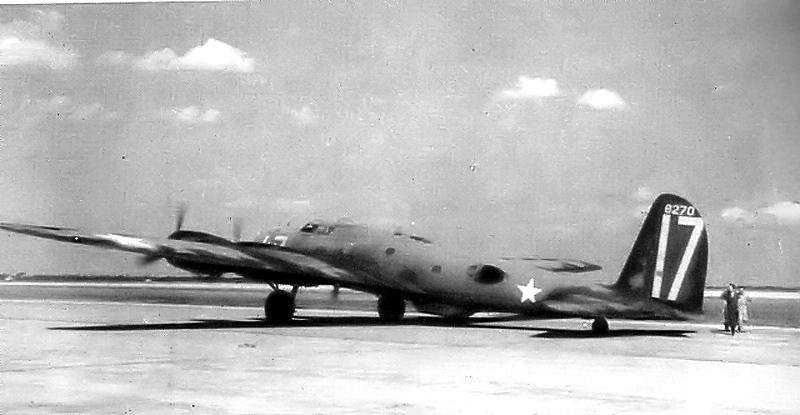
B-17B Flying Fortress, AAF Ser. No. 38-270, at Hendricks AAF, 1942

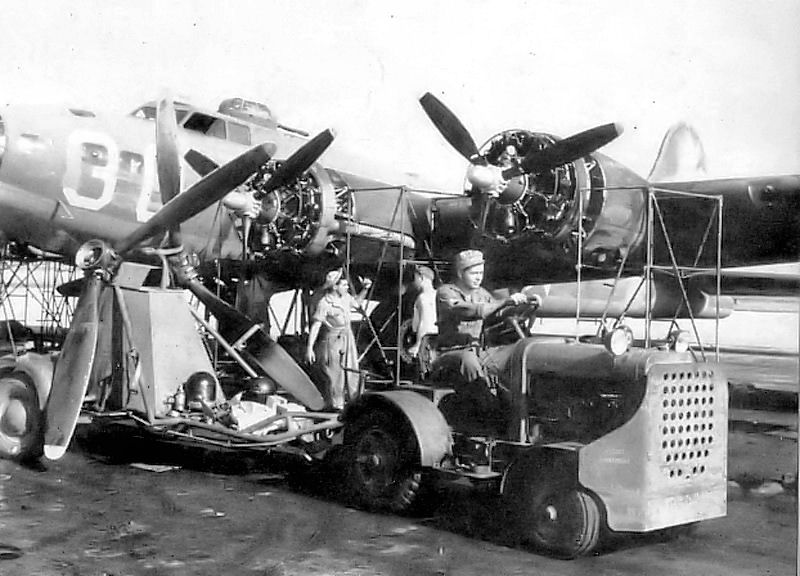
B-17 Engine maintenance

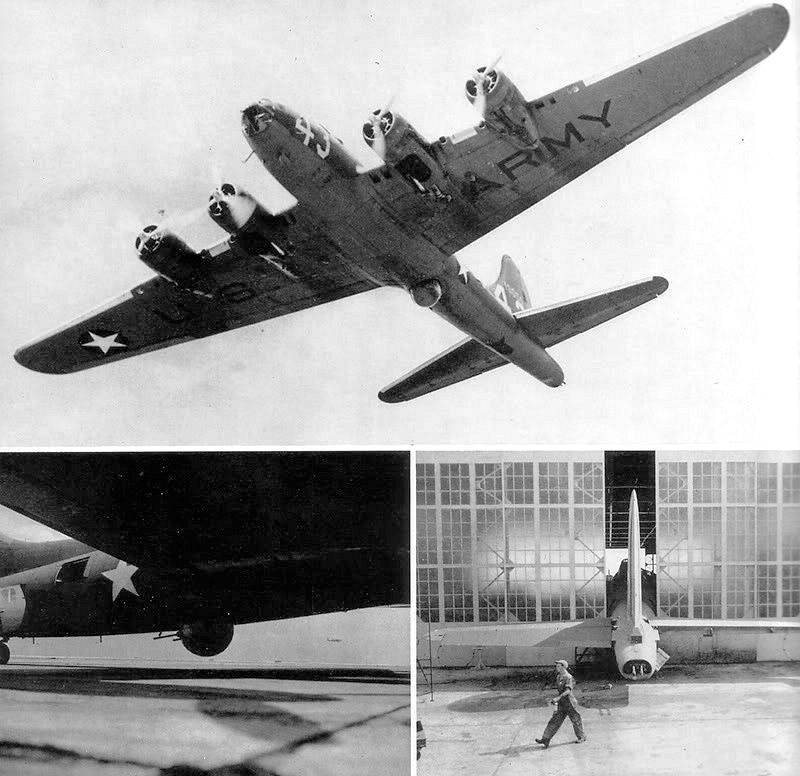
1942 Yearbook photos

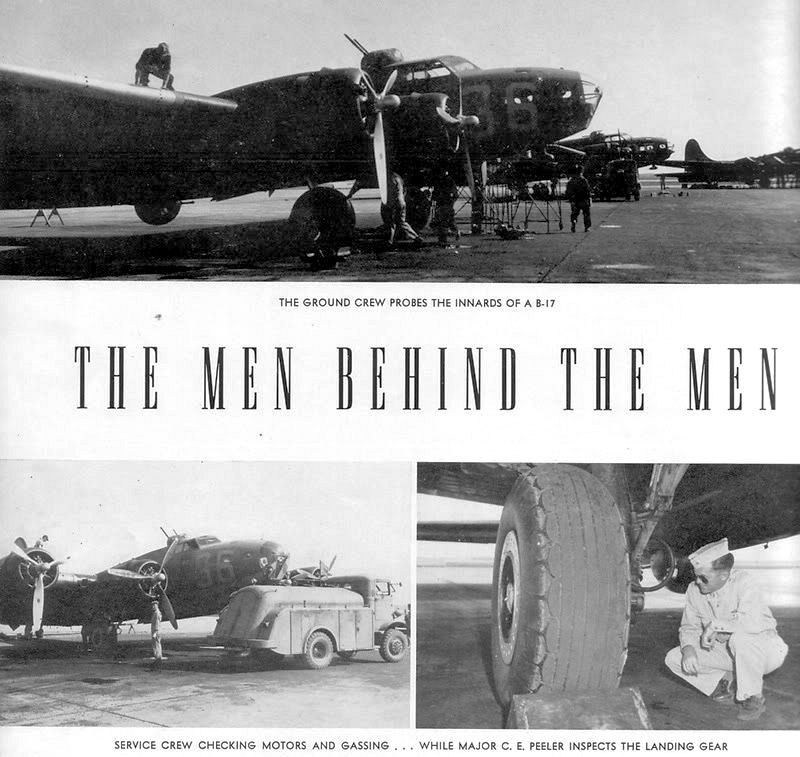
1942 Yearbook photos

The base was renamed Hendricks Field on 14 January 1942. It was assigned to the Army Air Forces Training Command, Eastern Flight Training Center, 76th Flying Training Wing. On 29 January 1942, the first B-17 Flying Fortress landed at Hendricks Field. In peak operation about 120 B-17's were assigned and over 10,000 pilots and other crewmembers were trained.

Initially the Combat Crew Training School consisted of one qualified B-17 pilot, one B-17 mechanic and one B-17 airplane. But this team trained additional pilots, and these additional pilots brought in other B-17s, with the result that an Instructors School was organized, and after one month's operations was able to make full use of the 10 B-17's later assigned to the field.

March 1942 saw the beginning of the program which would train and coordinate combat crews; Pilot, Copilot, Navigator, Bombardier, Aerial Engineer, Radio Operator, and Gunners. With the arrival of additional B-17's came a staff of student instructors, both flying and ground school. And in short order the program was in full swing. That program continued until the latter part of 1942, during which hundreds of combat crews were trained and dispatched to the European and North African Theatres of Operations, where they distinguished themselves in raids on enemy shipping, airfields and other ground installations.

Later in 1942, the mission of Hendricks Field was changed. It was to be a specialized school for four-engine first pilots; other members of the combat crews would be assembled at other points after training at specialized schools for Copilots, Navigators, Bombardiers, Aerial Engineers, Radio Operators and Gunners. Thousands of trained pilots were sent to Hendricks field to upgrade from single and twin engine ratings for transition. During the war, graduates of the school produced B-17, B-24 and later, B-29 Superfortress flight crews. In addition, the Hendricks Field ground school was regarded as one of the leading ones in the Army Air Forces. Classes were taught in navigations meteorology, radio and engineering.

In an administrative reorganization by HQ Army Air Force, on 1 May 1944, numbered training units in the Zone of the Interior (ZI) (Continental United States) were re-designated as "Army Air Forces Base Units". At Hendricks, the 2137th Army Air Forces Base Unit (Pilot School, Specialized 4-Engine) became the flying training school. The operational squadrons of the school were also re-designated as "A" to "D". The training missions continued under these new designations.

=== Closure ===
With the end of the European war in May 1945, the pace of training pilots slowed down during the summer months. With the Japanese surrender in August of that year, training programs ended and flight operations at Hendricks began to wind down. Air traffic consisted of transient aircraft as de-mobilization was the order of the day, with most personnel being returned to civilian life.

In November 1945, HQ Air Training Command announced that Hendricks Field was one of the many wartime training bases that would be inactivated. The base was transferred to Air Technical Service Command (ATSC), whose mission was the transfer of any useful military equipment to other bases around the country. The base was closed on 31 December 1945 and declared as surplus in 1946, being was turned over to the War Assets Administration (WAA) for disposal.

On February 21, 1946, the city of Sebring received a permit to operate a civilian airfield on the site and on May 1, 1946, the abandoned airfield was turned over to the City of Sebring to become Sebring Air Terminal, now Sebring Regional Airport & Commerce Park; and the Sebring International Raceway.

== See also ==
- Florida World War II Army Airfields
- 76th Flying Training Wing (World War II)
- Air Force (film) Filmed at Hendricks AAF in 1943 with the B-17Bs standing in for B-17Ds
- Sebring Regional Airport, occupying part of the former Army Airfield
- Sebring International Raceway Opened in 1950, utilizes the former runways and taxiways of the airfield
- 12 Hours of Sebring Annual motorsport endurance race for sports cars held at the former airfield.
