= Grant-Valkaria, Florida =

- Town
- Town of Grant-Valkaria
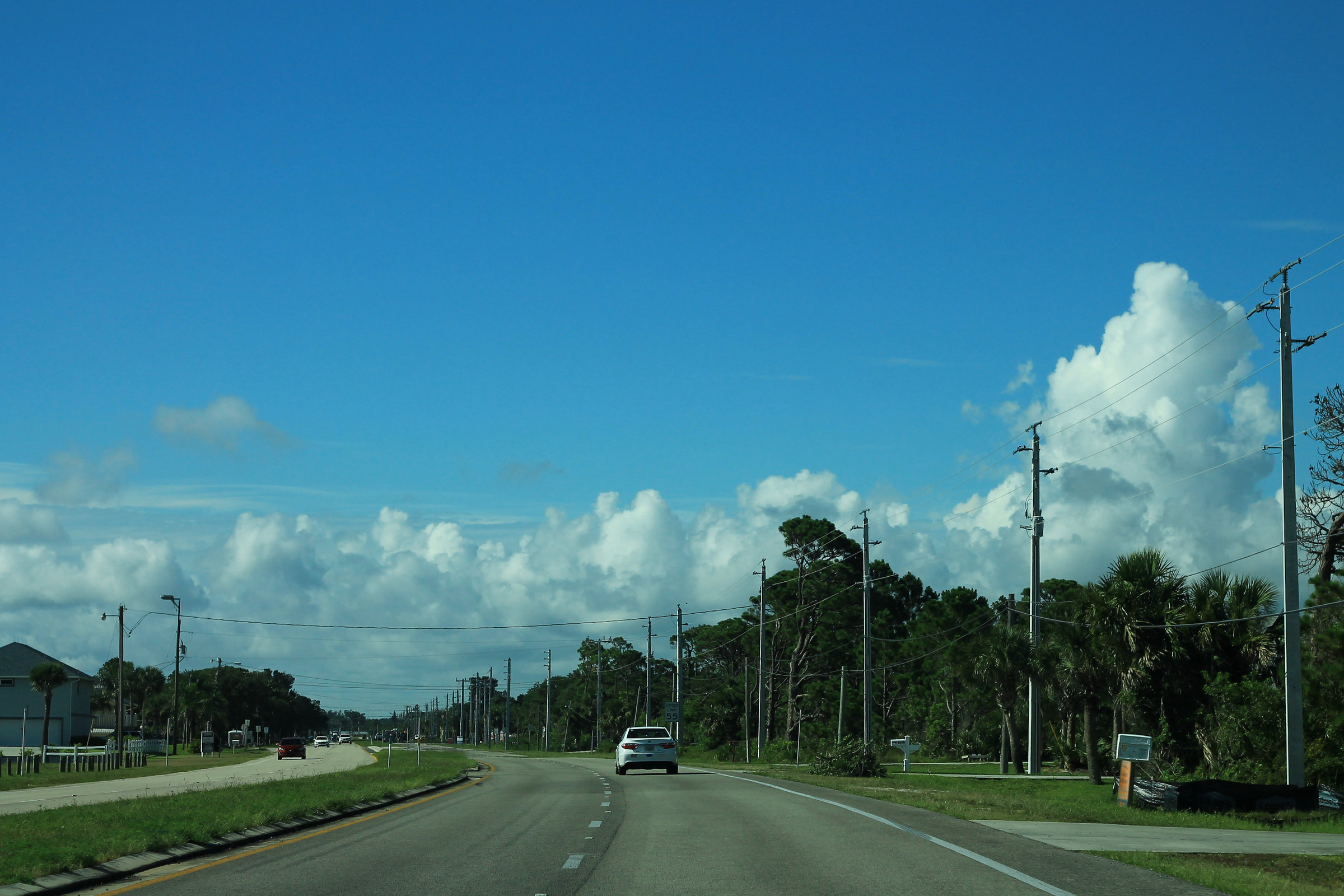
- Driving through U.S. Route 1 in Grant-Valkaria

- Seal

- Location within Florida Location within the United States
- Coordinates: 27°54′50″N 80°31′56″W
- Country: United States
- State: Florida
- County: Brevard
- Settled: c. Late 1880s
- Incorporated: July 25, 2006

Government
  - Type: Mayor–Council
  - Mayor: Lisette Kolar
  - Vice Mayor: Mike Bradvarevic
  - Town Council: Tom Sammon, Rick Hood, Dan Faden, Brent Jackson, and Dan Robino
  - Town Administrator: Jason Mahaney
  - Town Clerk: Jessica Keenan

Area
  - Total: 30.25 sq mi (78.36 km^{2})
  - Land: 27.22 sq mi (70.50 km^{2})
  - Water: 3.03 sq mi (7.86 km^{2})
- Elevation: 23 ft (7.0 m)

Population (2020)
  - Total: 4,509
  - Density: 165.6/sq mi (63.95/km^{2})
- Time zone: UTC-5 (Eastern (EST))
  - Summer (DST): UTC-4 (EDT)
- ZIP codes: 32949, 32950, 32909
- Area code: 321
- FIPS code: 12-27256
- GNIS feature ID: 2406605
- Website: www.GrantValkaria.org

Grant-Valkaria is a town in Brevard County, Florida. It is part of the Palm Bay–Melbourne–Titusville, Florida Metropolitan Statistical Area, and located on the Space Coast. The town's population was 4,509 as the 2020 census, up from 3,850 at the 2010 census.

== History ==
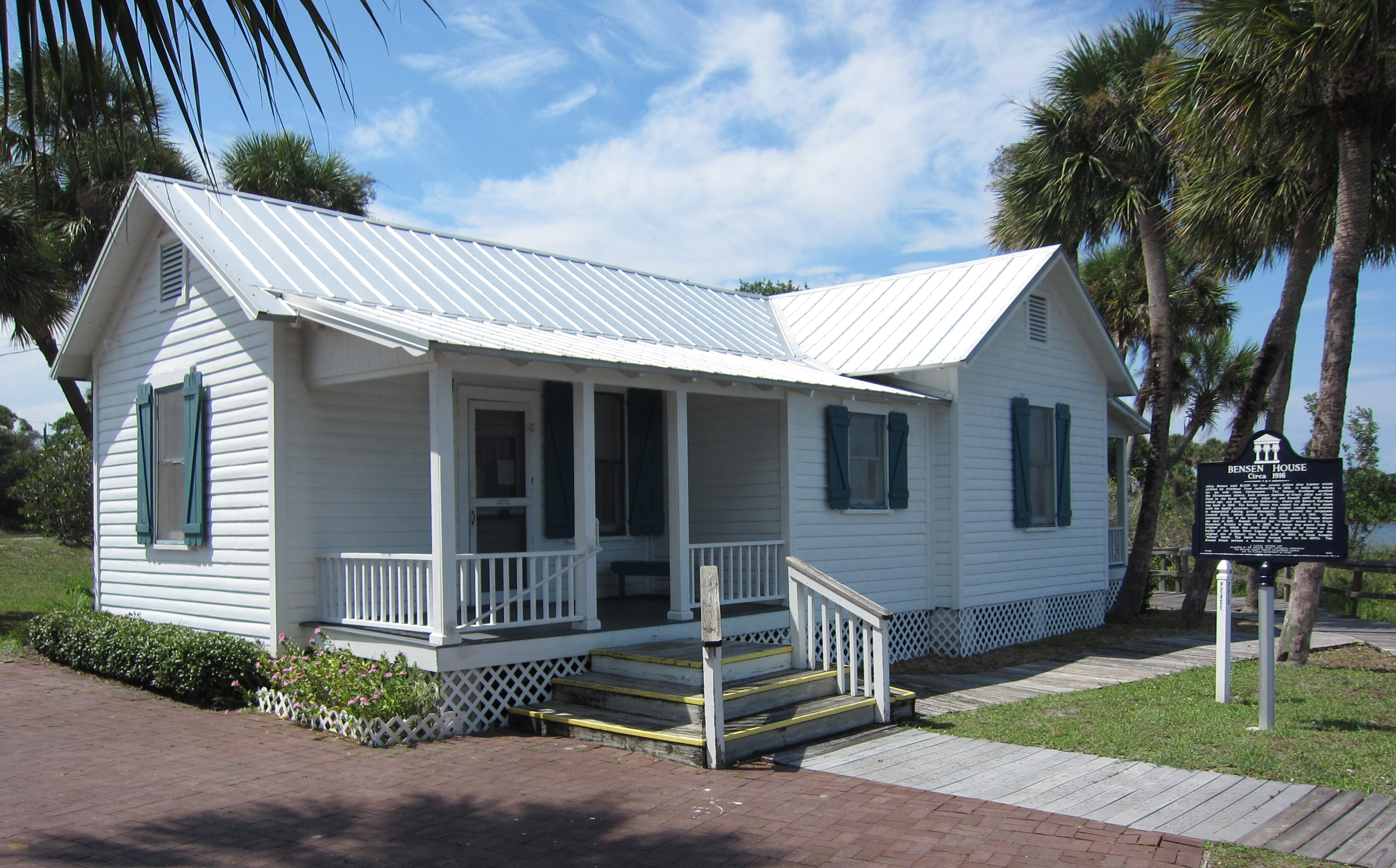
Bensen House

The first residents were the indigenous Ais people, and the town's first non-indigenous settlers were some of the 75 Danish families in the late 1880s who decided to reside in the Grant-Valkaria area instead of the area between Vero Beach and Ft. Pierce, where most of the Danes were settling.

The community of Grant was originally established in the late 1880s as a fishing village, with agriculture also a part of both communities' histories.

The community of Valkaria was founded in the late 1880s too, and its name derives from Valkyrie, a warrior-maiden of Norse mythology.

A MISTRAM (missile) tracking system was built in Grant-Valkaria by the US Air Force and NASA, and the Valkaria Airport had a station there from the 1950s to the 1970s.

The Town of Grant-Valkaria was officially incorporated as a municipality on July 25, 2006, by combining the two previously separate, unincorporated communities of Grant and Valkaria.

== Geography ==
Grant-Valkaria is located south of Melbourne, between Palm Bay and Sebastian.

=== Surrounding areas ===
- Malabar
- Indian River Lagoon; Floridana Beach
- Palm Bay
- Micco; Barefoot Bay

=== Climate ===
The Town of Grant-Valkaria is part of the humid subtropical climate zone with a Köppen Climate Classification of "Cfa" (C = mild temperate, f = fully humid, and a = hot summer)

== Demographics ==
Historical population
Census	Pop.	Note	%±
2010	3,850		—
2020	4,509		17.1%
U.S. Decennial Census

=== Racial and ethnic composition ===
Grant-Valkaria racial composition (Hispanics excluded from racial categories) (NH = Non-Hispanic)
Race	Pop 2010	Pop 2020	% 2010	% 2020
White (NH)	3,390	3,781	88.05%	83.85%
Black or African American (NH)	147	164	3.82%	3.64%
Native American or Alaska Native (NH)	17	13	0.44%	0.29%
Asian (NH)	60	48	1.56%	1.06%
Pacific Islander or Native Hawaiian (NH)	2	3	0.05%	0.07%
Some other race (NH)	3	25	0.08%	0.55%
Two or more races/Multiracial (NH)	55	183	1.43%	4.06%
Hispanic or Latino (any race)	176	292	4.57%	6.48%
Total	3,850	4,509	100.00%	100.00%

Grant-Valkaria had a population of 4,449, and was the 510th most populated city in Florida, as of 2022.

In 2021, the median household income in Grant-Valkaria was $82,273 per year, although 6.3% of Grant-Valkaria's population lived in poverty. The median age for Grant-Valkaria was 54.

=== 2020 census ===
As of the 2020 census, Grant-Valkaria had a population of 4,509. The median age was 55.8 years. 14.3% of residents were under the age of 18 and 27.7% of residents were 65 years of age or older. For every 100 females there were 103.1 males, and for every 100 females age 18 and over there were 102.5 males age 18 and over.

As of 2020, 17.4% of residents lived in urban areas, while 82.6% lived in rural areas.

In 2020, there were 1,842 households in Grant-Valkaria, of which 19.9% had children under the age of 18 living in them. Of all households, 64.8% were married-couple households, 14.7% were households with a male householder and no spouse or partner present, and 14.0% were households with a female householder and no spouse or partner present. About 18.1% of all households were made up of individuals and 10.1% had someone living alone who was 65 years of age or older.

In 2020, there were 1,989 housing units, of which 7.4% were vacant. The homeowner vacancy rate was 0.7% and the rental vacancy rate was 10.2%.

According to 2020 American Community Survey 5-year estimates, there were 1,197 families residing in the town.

=== 2010 census ===
As of the 2010 United States census, there were 3,850 people, 1,443 households, and 1,147 families residing in the town.

== Government ==
In 2007, the town had a taxable real estate base of $503.37 million.

The town charter reflects the reason for incorporation and calls for future development to be consistent with a rural and fishing village lifestyle that preserves the history and natural green spaces of the two communities. Government services are to be kept to a minimum, density kept low and lot sizes kept large.

== Culture ==
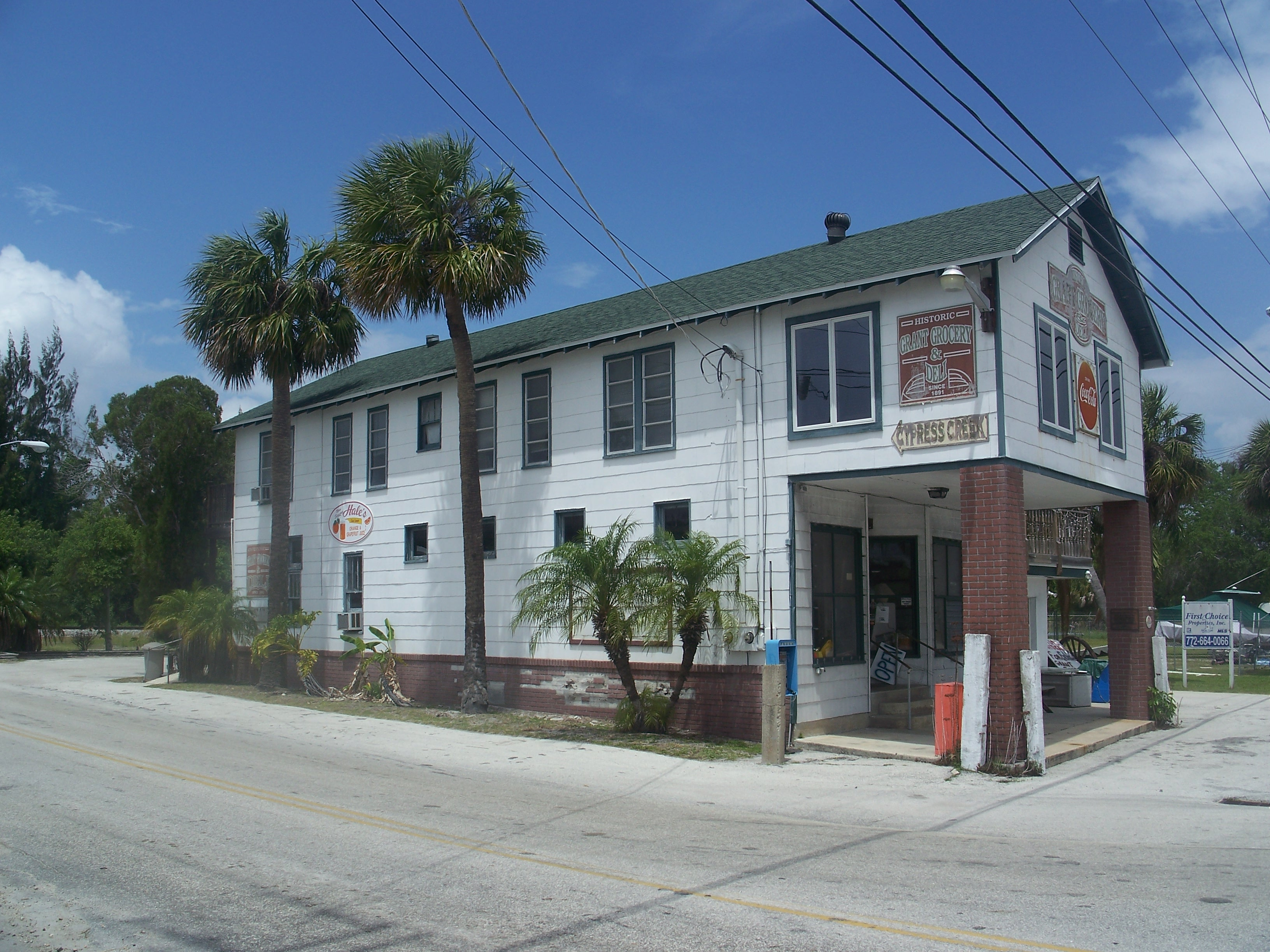
Jorgensen's General Store

A largely rural town in the south end of the county, the town includes older homes, newer homes on acre-plus lots and the county-owned Habitat Golf Course, a 6,836-yard (6,251 m), par-72 course near the Valkaria Airport.

The town has held the Grant Seafood Festival every year on the last weekend of February since 1966. In 1968, then U.S. Vice-President Hubert Humphrey visited the Seafood Festival while campaigning for his 1968 presidential bid. The proceeds go towards college scholarships for local children, as well as summer break activities for the community's children.

The town has the historic Bensen House as well as the historic Jorgensen's General Store.

== Transportation ==
- U.S. Route 1 (U.S. 1) – This US highway runs along the Indian River Lagoon.
- County Road 507 (CR 507) – Locally known as Babcock Street, CR 507 forms the western boundaries of Grant-Valkaria.
- The Valkaria Airport serves small general aviation aircraft.

== Notable people ==
- Billy Horschel, professional golfer, born in Grant
