= Palm Beach County Glades Airport =

Palm Beach County Glades Airport Pahokee Airport
- IATA: PHK; ICAO: KPHK; FAA LID: PHK

Summary
- Airport type: Public
- Owner: Palm Beach County
- Serves: Pahokee, Florida
- Elevation AMSL: 16 ft / 5 m
- Coordinates: 26°47′06″N 080°41′36″W

Map
- Location of airport in Florida PHK (the United States)

Runways
Direction	Length		Surface
Direction	ft	m	Surface
18/36	4,116	1,255	Asphalt

Statistics (2018)
- Aircraft operations: 36,750
- Based aircraft: 10
- Source: Federal Aviation Administration

Palm Beach County Glades Airport (IATA: PHK, ICAO: KPHK, FAA LID: PHK), also known as Pahokee Airport, is a county-owned, public-use airport in Palm Beach County, Florida, United States. It is located three nautical miles (6 km) southwest of the central business district of Pahokee, Florida. The airport is owned by Palm Beach County and operated by the Palm Beach County Airports Department. It is included in the National Plan of Integrated Airport Systems for 2011–2015, which categorized it as a general aviation facility.

== History ==
In 2004, Hurricane Frances and Hurricane Jeanne destroyed the airport's main building, causing operations to be conducted from a trailer. In 2009, new buildings were dedicated, including a 2,300 sq ft (210 m^{2}) office/lobby, a 5,000 sq ft (460 m^{2}) main hangar, and a building containing 10 rental hangars.

In 2023, Palm Beach county commissioners considered a plan that would allow the airport's runway to be used for drag racing one day a week.

== Facilities and aircraft ==
Palm Beach County Glades Airport covers an area of 243 acres (98 ha) at an elevation of 16 feet (5 m) above mean sea level. It has one runway designated 18/36 with an asphalt surface measuring 4,116 by 75 feet (1,255 x 23 m).

For the 12-month period ending December 31, 2018, the airport had 36,750 aircraft operations, an average of 101 per day: 99% general aviation and <1% air taxi. At that time there were 10 aircraft based at this airport: all single-engine.

The airport, commonly referred to as "Pahokee", does not have a control tower. Pilots landing at Pahokee use self-announce procedures to notify other aircraft of take-offs and landings. The airport can handle aircraft with a single-wheel weight of up to 20,000 pounds (9,071 kg) although local regulations restrict aircraft to 12,500 pounds (5,670 kg) and under. Because of the VOR/DME systems and relatively low traffic, this airport is one of five South Florida airports that is used for instrument training by student pilots.

The airport's fixed-base operator (FBO) is Landmark Aviation. The former FBO was Pahokee Aviation, Inc.

== Environmental concerns ==
Due to environmental considerations of the Florida everglades ecosystem, water drainage is strictly regulated by the East Shore Water Control District. Excess water drains from the Airport onto Closter Farms, located adjacent to the airport. The County compensates Closter Farms for drainage services that Closter's provides to take care of the excess drainage.

== Accidents and incidents ==
- On March 8, 2019, a Piper PA-23 aircraft crashed into Lake Okeechobee while on approach to the airport. Five people were killed. The pilot declared an emergency and reported a rough-running engine before the crash.
- In December 2023, a Cirrus SR20 on a training flight crashed while landing at the Palm Beach County Glades Airport. The probable cause of the accident was found to be the flight instructor’s failure to maintain control of the airplane after encountering a wind gust during landing.

== See also ==
- List of airports in Florida
