= Belle Glade Camp, Florida =

- unincorporated place
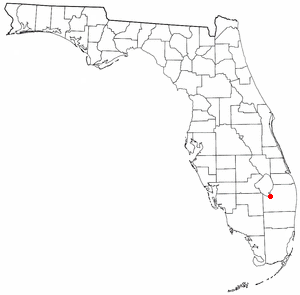
- Location of Belle Glade Camp, Florida
- Coordinates: 26°39′35″N 80°40′57″W
- Country: United States
- State: Florida
- County: Palm Beach

Area
  - Total: 0.46 sq mi (1.2 km^{2})
  - Land: 0.46 sq mi (1.2 km^{2})
  - Water: 0 sq mi (0.0 km^{2})
- Elevation: 9.8 ft (3 m)

Population (2000)
  - Total: 1,141
  - Density: 2,380/sq mi (919/km^{2})
- Time zone: UTC-5 (Eastern (EST))
  - Summer (DST): UTC-4 (EDT)
- Area codes: 561, 728
- FIPS code: 12-05225
- GNIS feature ID: 1867114

Belle Glade Camp was a former census-designated place (CDP) and current unincorporated place in Palm Beach County, Florida, United States. The population was 1,141 at the 2000 census.

== Geography ==
Belle Glade Camp is located at 26°39′35″N 80°40′57″W (26.659764, -80.682615).

According to the United States Census Bureau, the CDP has a total area of 1.2 km^{2} (0.46 sq mi), all land.

== Demographics ==
Historical population
Census	Pop.	Note	%±
1950	1,497		—
1960	1,658		10.8%
1970	1,892		14.1%
1980	1,645		−13.1%
1990	1,616		−1.8%
2000	1,141		−29.4%
source: U.S. Decennial Census; 1990 2000

Belle Glade Camp CDP, Florida – Racial and ethnic composition Note: the US Census treats Hispanic/Latino as an ethnic category. This table excludes Latinos from the racial categories and assigns them to a separate category. Hispanics/Latinos may be of any race.
Race / Ethnicity (NH = Non-Hispanic)	Pop 2000	2000
White alone (NH)	16	1.40%
Black or African American alone (NH)	791	69.33%
Native American or Alaska Native alone (NH)	4	0.35%
Asian alone (NH)	0	0.00%
Native Hawaiian or Pacific Islander alone (NH)	0	0.00%
Other race alone (NH)	0	0.00%
Mixed race or Multiracial (NH)	60	5.26%
Hispanic or Latino (any race)	270	23.66%
Total	1,141	100.00%

As of the census of 2000, there were 1,141 people, 284 households, and 232 families residing in the CDP. The population density was 917.8 people/km^{2} (2,377 people/mi^{2}). There were 294 housing units at an average density of 236.5 units/km^{2} (613 units/mi^{2}). The racial makeup of the CDP was 13.15% White (1.4% Non-Hispanic White), 69.59% African American, 0.35% Native American, 0.18% Pacific Islander, 10.60% from other races, and 6.13% from two or more races. Hispanic or Latino of any race were 23.66% of the population.

In 2000, there were 284 households, out of which 54.2% had children under the age of 18 living with them, 35.9% were married couples living together, 29.6% had a female householder with no husband present, and 18.0% were non-families. 14.4% of all households were made up of individuals, and 2.5% had someone living alone who was 65 years of age or older. The average household size was 4.02 and the average family size was 4.35.

In 2000, in the former CDP, the population was spread out, with 46.3% under the age of 18, 11.4% from 18 to 24, 26.3% from 25 to 44, 12.8% from 45 to 64, and 3.2% who were 65 years of age or older. The median age was 20 years. For every 100 females, there were 89.9 males. For every 100 females age 18 and over, there were 87.5 males.

In 2000, the median income for a household in the CDP was $20,278, and the median income for a family was $17,656. Males had a median income of $22,574 versus $15,455 for females. The per capita income for the CDP was $4,995. About 57.1% of families and 62.1% of the population were below the poverty line, including 70.1% of those under age 18 and 74.1% of those age 65 or over.

As of 2000, English as a first language was spoken by 59.21% of all residents, while French Creole accounted for 25.84% and Spanish was the mother tongue for 14.94% of the population.

== Schools ==
- Crestwood Middle School
- Glades Central High School
