= Umatilla Municipal Airport =

Airport in Florida, U.S.

Coordinates: 28°55′22.50″N 081°39′07.00″W

- IATA: none; ICAO: none; FAA LID: X23

Summary
- Airport type: Public use
- Owner: City of Umatilla
- Operator: Scott Blankenship
- Serves: Umatilla, Florida
- Location: Lake County, Florida
- Elevation AMSL: 106 ft / 32 m

Map

Runways
Direction	Length		Surface
Direction	ft	m	Surface
01/19	2,876	877	Asphalt

Statistics (2018)
- Aircraft operations (year ending 9/18/2018): 8,000
- Based aircraft: 25
- Source: Federal Aviation Administration

Umatilla Municipal Airport (FAA LID: X23) is a public-use airport located 1 nautical mile (1.85 km) east of the central business district of the city of Umatilla in Lake County, Florida, United States. The airport is publicly owned.

== See also ==
- List of airports in Florida
