= Immokalee Regional Airport =

Airport in Collier County, Florida, U.S.

Immokalee Regional Airport (former Immokalee Army Airfield)
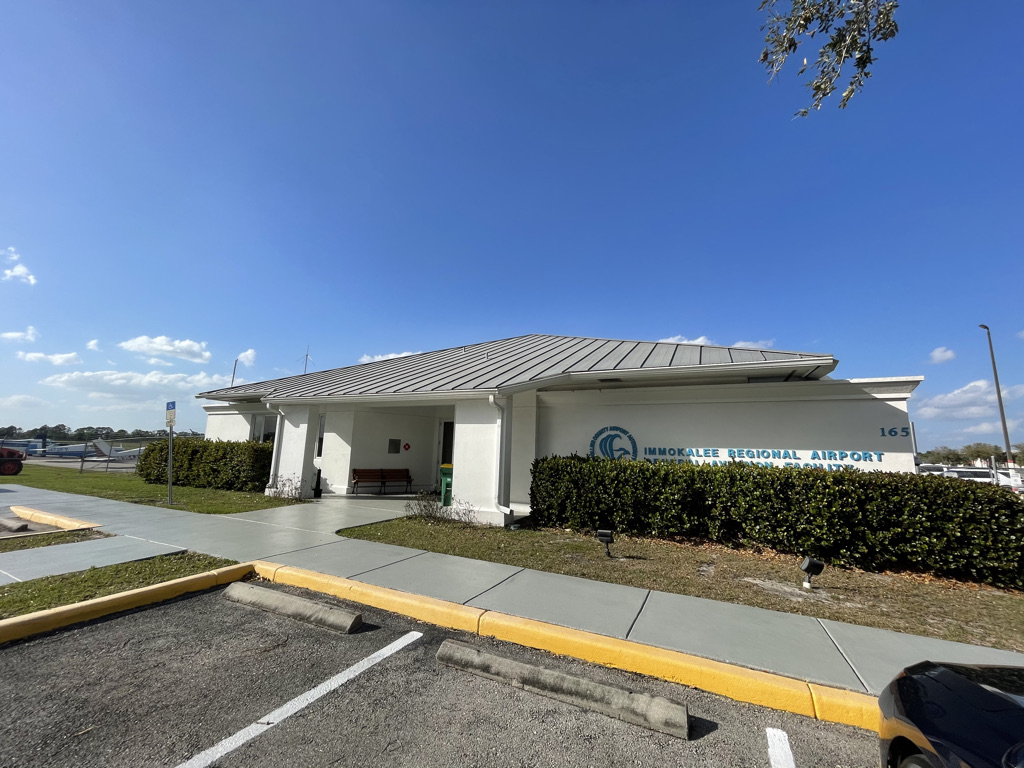
- General aviation terminal in 2021
- IATA: IMM; ICAO: KIMM; FAA LID: IMM

Summary
- Airport type: Public
- Owner: Collier County Airport Authority
- Serves: Immokalee, Florida
- Elevation AMSL: 37 ft (11 m)
- Coordinates: 26°26′02″N 81°24′05″W
- Website: www.CollierGov.net/...

Map
- Location of airport in Florida IMM (the United States)

Runways
| Direction | Length | | Surface |
| Direction | ft | m | Surface |
|---|---|---|---|
| 9/27 | 5,000 | 1,524 | Asphalt |
| 18/36 | 4,550 | 1,387 | Asphalt |

Statistics (2019)
- Aircraft operations (year ending 2/28/2019): 37, 850
- Based aircraft: 31
- Source: Federal Aviation Administration

Immokalee Regional Airport (IATA: IMM, ICAO: KIMM, FAA LID: IMM) is a public use airport located one nautical mile (2 km) northeast of the central business district of Immokalee, in Collier County, Florida, United States. The airport is owned by the Collier County Airport Authority. Formerly known as Immokalee Airport, it is included in the National Plan of Integrated Airport Systems for 2011–2015, which categorized it as a general aviation facility.

== History ==
The Immokalee Regional Airport was established as Immokalee Army Airfield, and activated on July 5, 1942. It was assigned to United States Army Air Forces East Coast Training Center (later Eastern Training Command). It was an auxiliary to Hendricks Army Airfield and was an AAF Specialized Pilot Training School (4-Engine) for B-17 and B-24 heavy bombers. The airfield also provided flexible gunnery training for Buckingham Army Airfield near Fort Myers.

It was transferred to Third Air Force in July 1944 with the drawdown of AAFTC's pilot training program and was a group training facility for replacement personnel. It became an auxiliary of the Sarasota Army Airfield replacement fighter pilot training school.

The airfield was declared surplus and turned over to the Army Corps of Engineers on September 30, 1945. It was eventually discharged to the War Assets Administration and became a civil airport.

== Facilities and aircraft ==
Immokalee Regional Airport covers an area of 1,330 acres (538 ha) at an elevation of 37 feet (11 m) above mean sea level. It has two asphalt paved runways, designated 9/27 and 18/36. 9/27 is 5,000 x 100 feet (1,524 x 30 m) and 18/36 is 4,550 x 150 feet (1,387 x 46 m).

For the 12-month period ending February 28, 2019, the airport had 37,700 general aviation aircraft operations, and 150 military operations, an average of 104 per day. At that time there were 31 aircraft based at this airport: 24 single-engine, 6 multi-engine, and 1 helicopter.

== See also ==
- Florida World War II Army Airfields
- List of airports in Florida
