= Belle Glade State Municipal Airport =

Coordinates: 26°41′53.9″N 080°39′38.9″W

- IATA: none; ICAO: none; FAA LID: X10

Summary
- Airport type: Public use
- Owner: State of Florida
- Operator: Kenny Throup
- Serves: Belle Glade, Florida
- Location: Palm Beach County, Florida
- Elevation AMSL: 14 ft (4.3 m)
- Interactive map of Belle Glade State Municipal Airport

Runways
Direction	Length		Surface
Direction	ft	m	Surface
09/27	3,455	1,053	Asphalt

Statistics (2018)
- Aircraft operations (year ending 1/12/2018): 1,800
- Based aircraft: 5
- Source: Federal Aviation Administration

Belle Glade State Municipal Airport (FAA LID: X10) is a public-use airport located 1 mile (1.6 km) northeast of the central business district of the city of Belle Glade in Palm Beach County, Florida, United States. The airport is publicly owned.

== See also ==
- List of airports in Florida
