= Clearwater Executive Airport =

Airport in Clearwater, Florida, U.S.

Coordinates: 27°58′36″N 082°45′31″W

- IATA: CLW; ICAO: KCLW; FAA LID: CLW

Summary
- Airport type: Public
- Owner: City of Clearwater
- Location: Clearwater, Florida
- Elevation AMSL: 71 ft (22 m)

Map
- Location of airport in Florida CLW (the United States)

Runways
Direction	Length		Surface
Direction	ft	m	Surface
16/34	4,108	1,252	Asphalt

Statistics (2017)
- Aircraft operations (year ending 12/14/2017): 50,590
- Based aircraft: 36
- Sources: Airport website and FAA

Clearwater Executive Airport (IATA: CLW, ICAO: KCLW, FAA LID: CLW) is a city-owned public-use airport located three miles (4.8 km) northeast of the central business district of Clearwater, a city in Pinellas County, Florida, United States.

As of March 1, 2023, The airpark is managed by FlyUSA Inc. on behalf of the city. On March 31st, 2025 the Clearwater City Council officially approved renaming of Clearwater Airpark to Clearwater Executive Airport.

== Facilities and aircraft ==
Clearwater Executive Airport covers an area of 47 acres (19 ha) which contains one asphalt paved runway (16/34) measuring 4,108 ft × 75 ft (1,252 m × 23 m). Take offs and landings are permitted from 7 a.m. to 11 p.m.

On March 30, 2026, the Clearwater city council approved a $13.6 million contract with a local construction company to build a new terminal building. The new building will replace a trailer building constructed in 2004 that was originally intended to be temporary. Ground was broke on the new terminal that July.

For the 12-month period ending December 14, 2017, the airport had 50,590 aircraft operations, an average of 139 per day: 100% general aviation, 1% air taxi and 1% military. There was 36 aircraft based at this airport: 30 single-engine, 5 multi-engine and 1 helicopter.

== Accidents and incidents ==
- On February 1, 2024, a Beechcraft Bonanza V35 crashed into a mobile home park in Clearwater, FL and a post-impact fire occurred. A total of four mobile homes were damaged from the crash. The pilot was on approach to runway 34 at KCLW when he encountered engine issues; the pilot also reported trouble locating the airport while attempting to land, eventually leading to the installation of a rotating beacon at the airport. The pilot was killed, along with two people on the ground.

== See also ==
- List of airports in Florida
