= Tallahassee Commercial Airport =

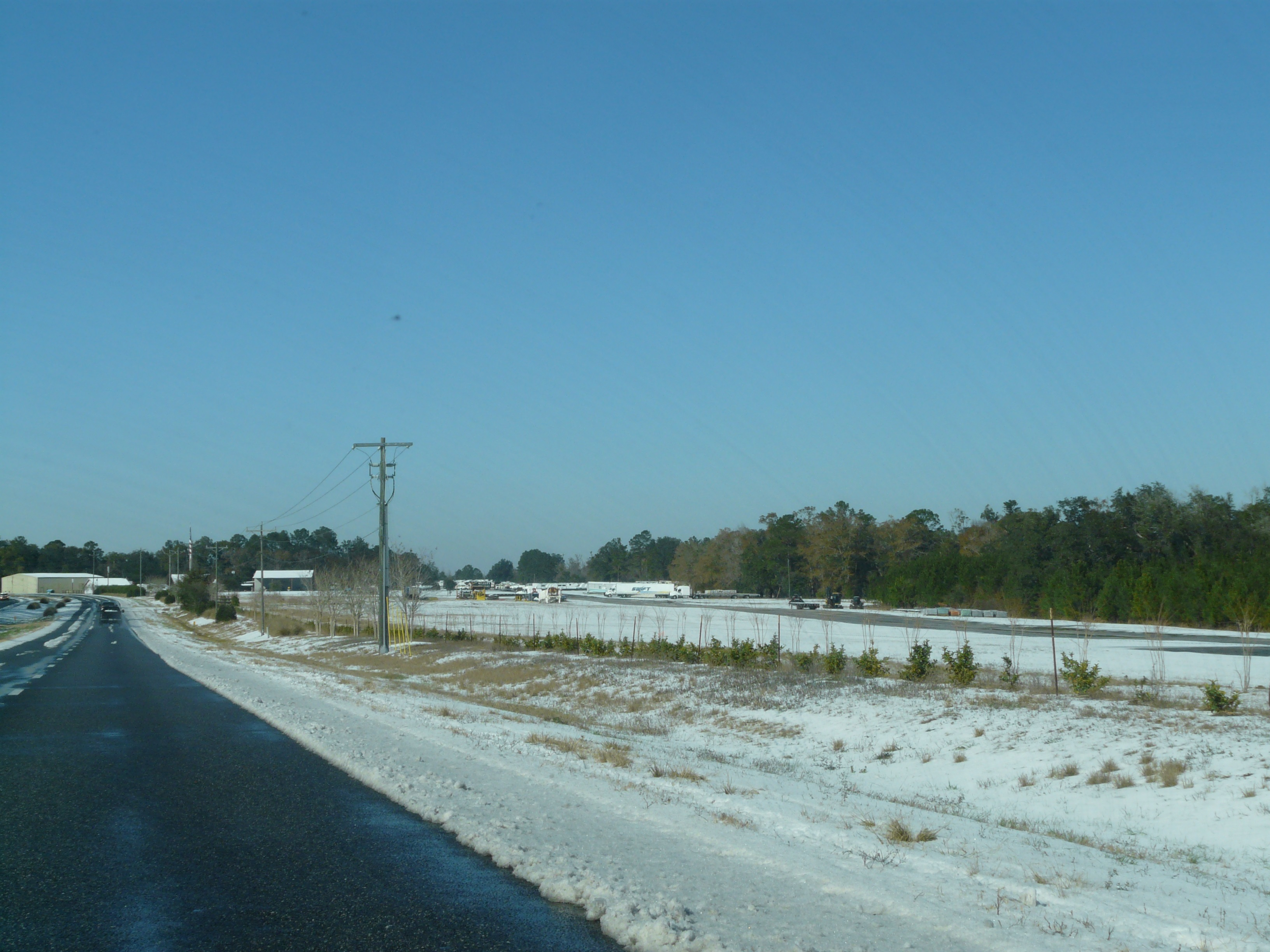
- IATA: none; ICAO: none; FAA LID: 68J

Summary
- Airport type: Privately owned / public use
- Owner: J. W. Hinson, Jr.
- Location: Tallahassee, Florida
- Elevation AMSL: 155 ft / 47 m
- Coordinates: 30°32′50″N 84°22′26″W
- Interactive map of Tallahassee Commercial Airport

Runways
Direction	Length		Surface
Direction	ft	m	Surface
16/34	3,249	990	Asphalt

Tallahassee Commercial Airport (FAA LID: 68J) is a closed, privately owned airport located on US 27, 8 miles (13 km) northwest of the central business district (CBD) of Tallahassee, the county seat of Leon County, Florida, United States. As of January 13, 2011, the FAA reported the airport as "closed indefinitely" due to pending construction.

== Facilities ==
Tallahassee Commercial Airport covers 184 acres (74 ha) and has one runway:

- Runway 16/34: 3,249 x 50 ft. (990 x 15 m), surface: asphalt
  - The runway is described as being in poor condition, with surface cracking.
  - The first 50 feet of Runway 16 are closed indefinitely.

== See also ==
- List of airports in Florida
