= Marco Island Airport =

Airport in Naples, Florida, United States

Marco Island Executive Airport Marco Island Airport
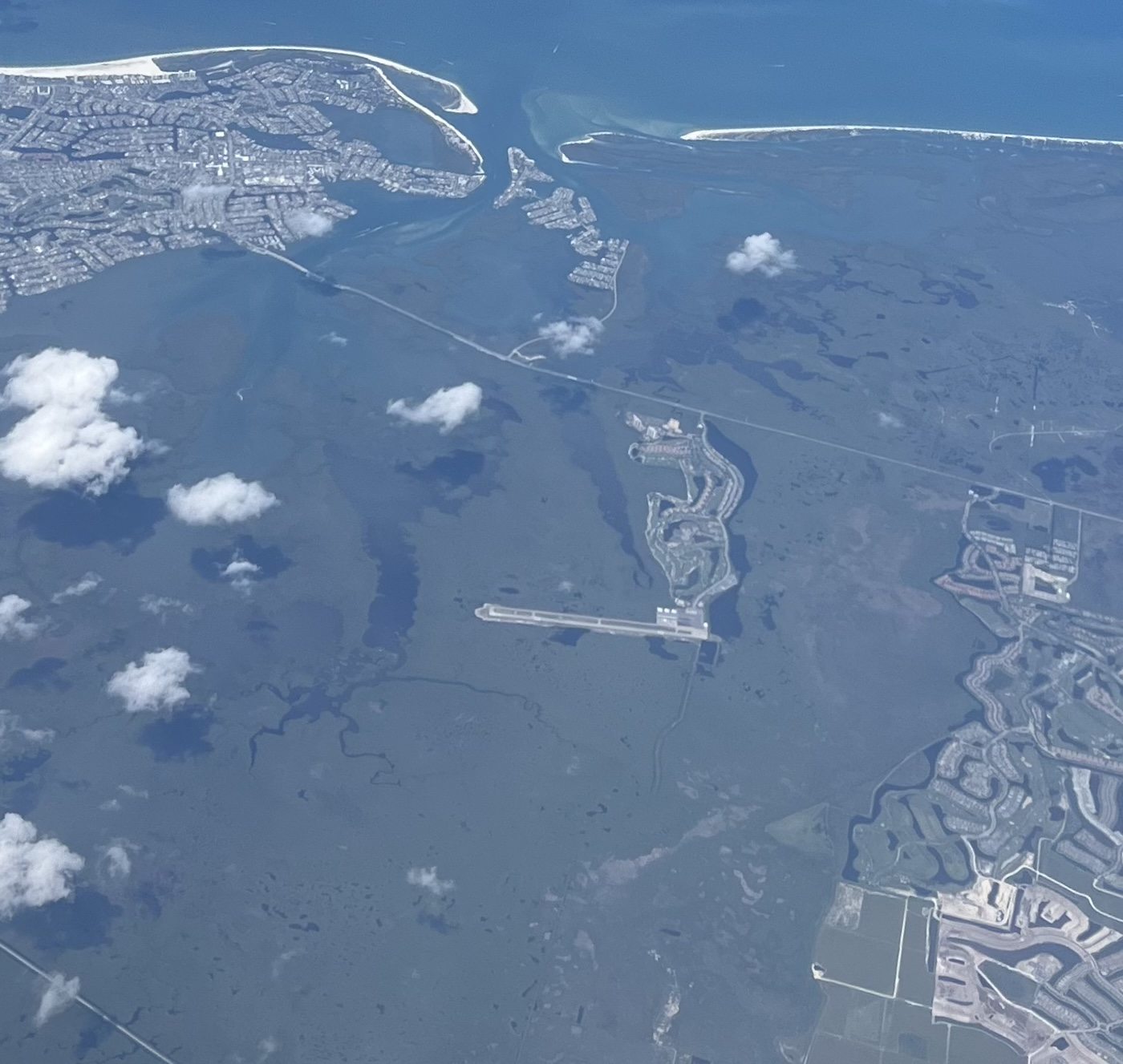
- IATA: MRK; ICAO: KMKY; FAA LID: MKY

Summary
- Airport type: Public
- Owner: Collier County Airport Authority
- Serves: Marco Island, Florida
- Location: Naples, Florida
- Opened: September 1976; 49 years ago
- Elevation AMSL: 5 ft / 2 m
- Coordinates: 25°59′42″N 081°40′21″W
- Website: www.colliercountyfl.gov/AirportAuthority
- Interactive map of Marco Island Executive Airport

Runways
Direction	Length		Surface
Direction	ft	m	Surface
17/35	5,000	1,524	Asphalt

Statistics (2022)
- Aircraft operations: 55,374
- Based aircraft: 37
- Source: FAA and airport website

Marco Island Executive Airport (IATA: MRK, ICAO: KMKY, FAA LID: MKY), also known as Marco Island Airport, is a public airport located in Naples, Collier County, Florida, four miles (6.4 km) northeast of the central business district of Marco Island. This airport is publicly owned by Collier County.

The Marco Island Executive Airport is conveniently located to Naples, Marco Island, Goodland and Isles of Capri.

The airport was initially designed to complement plans to create a resort area south of Naples. Immediately following completion in 1976, the airport was primarily used as a marketing tool to help sell Marco Island lots. Developers would fly prospective Marco Island homeowners and investors over from Miami. Eventually the developers turned the airport over to the state of Florida, and in the 1980s the state, in turn, leased it directly to the county. Recognizing that the airport represents a community asset, the county had the foresight to maintain the airport, and in 1993, the Collier County Airport Authority was created to develop and manage the Marco Island Executive Airport. Today, the airport represents a community asset, with travelers from all over the world making their way to this general aviation airport just north of Marco Island.

Although most U.S. airports use the same three-letter location identifier for the FAA and IATA, Marco Island Airport is assigned MKY by the FAA and MRK by the IATA (which assigned MKY to Mackay Airport in Mackay, Queensland, Australia). The airport's ICAO identifier is KMKY.

The airport served as a secondary hub for Marco Island Airways until that airline ceased operations in June 1986. Currently, the airport is home to several local flight schools, public air charters, aircraft maintenance providers and the Marco Island Squadron of the United States Civil Air Patrol.

== History ==
Prior to where the Marco Island Executive Airport is now, the airport was originally located on the island itself. The airport in 1965 was originally a temporary airstrip serving a way for the Deltona Corporation to bring potential home buyers to the island.

In 1968 there would be a newer airport built on the island located near what is now San Marco Road. Naples Airlines would be the only airline to service Marco until 1972 when the Deltona Corporation created their own airline. Marco Island Airways would be Marco's exclusive airline from 1972 until 1986 when they ceased operations. In 1973 a new terminal building would be built, replacing the old one. During the early 70s the airport was seeing 52-54 thousand passengers yearly. The airport would continue to operate until 1975 when the airport would be decommissioned and moved to where it is now.

In September 1976 the new terminal building would open after its construction started in 1972. This new airport included a 5000 ft runway and ramp space that could accommodate new private jets and Marco Island Airway's Martin 4040s. During the early 80s the Deltona Corporation was facing many lawsuits and gave the deed to the airport to the state, which would later lease the airport to Collier County. The airport would lose commercial service in 1987 when Provincetown-Boston Airlines left.

The airport would get a new taxiway (Taxiway A) connecting the end of runway 35 to the ramp. This allowed for there to be a way to travel from one end to the other without needing to backtrack on the runway. Started construction in 2010 and ended with a ribbon cutting ceremony in 2012.

== Facilities and aircraft ==
Marco Island Airport covers an area of 140 acres (57 ha) and contains one asphalt runway (17/35): 5,000 ft × 100 ft (1,524 m × 30 m).

The Airport underwent a $15 million terminal redevelopment initiative to construct a new, two-story terminal building as the old terminal was located within an unsafe distance from Runway 17/35. The project's construction commenced in April 2018 and was completed in 2020.

For 12-month period ending December 31, 2022 the airport had 55,374 aircraft operations, an average of 151 per day: 33% local general aviation, 67% transient general aviation, and <1% military. There are 37 aircraft based at this airport year-round: 82% single engine (30), 14% multi engine (5), 2% jet aircraft (1) and 2% helicopters (1), although this figure can triple during the busy winter seasonal months that runs from November through May.

== See also ==
- List of airports in Florida
