= Sneads, Florida =

Town in the state of Florida, United States

- Town
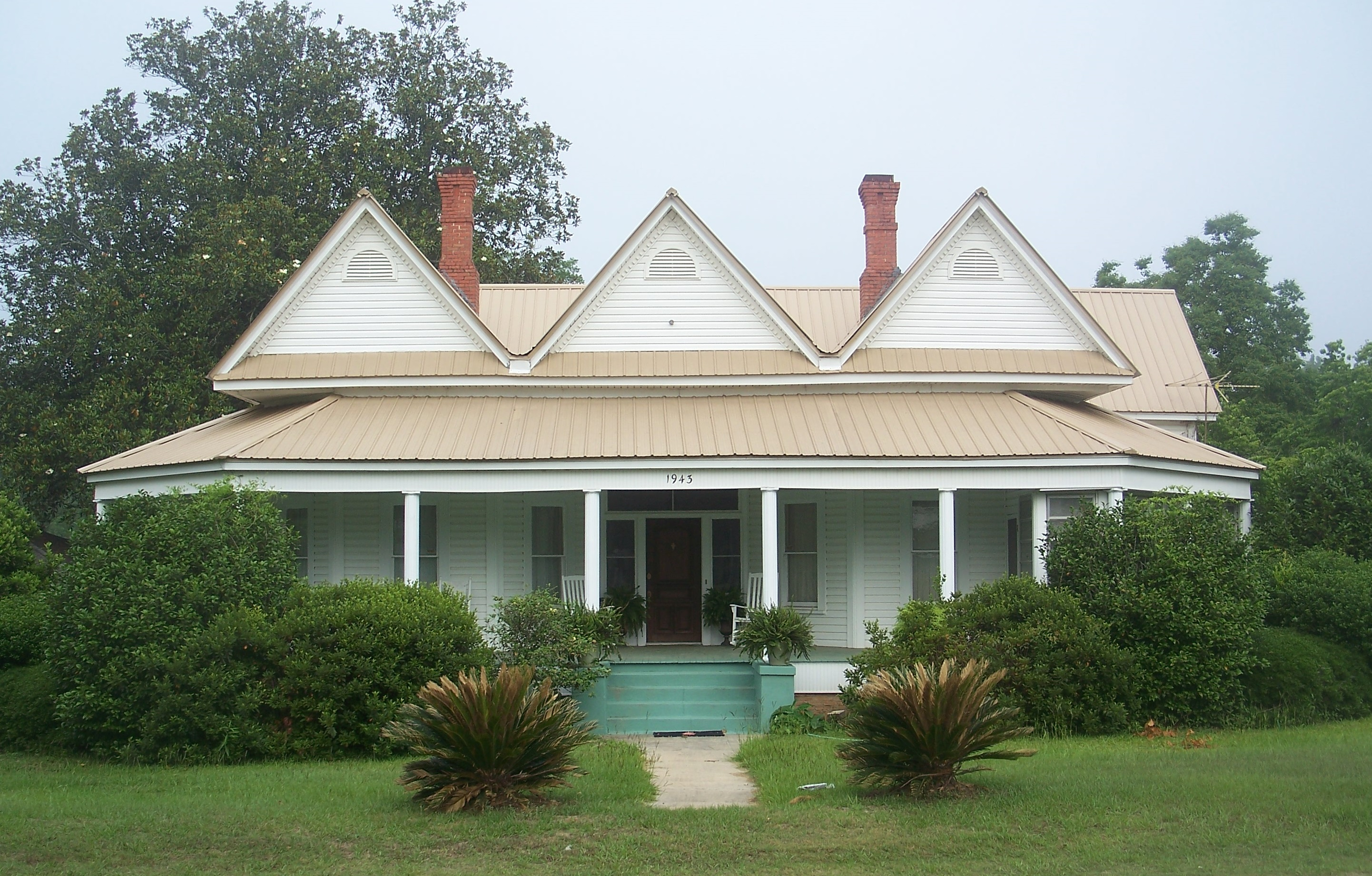
- A house in Sneads

- Location in Jackson County and the state of Florida
- Coordinates: 30°42′31″N 84°55′30″W
- Country: United States
- State: Florida
- County: Jackson
- Settled (Pope's Store): May 15, 1829–1837
- Settled (Gloucester): c. 1837–1870s
- Settled (Snead's Store): c. 1870s–1883
- Settled (Snead's Station): c. 1883–October 26, 1894
- Incorporated (Town of Sneads): October 26, 1894

Government
  - Type: Council–Manager
  - Council President: Mike Weeks
  - Council Vice President: Angela "Angie" Locke
  - Councillors: Timothy "Tim" Arnold, Timothy "Timmy" Perry, and Kay Neel
  - Town Manager: Bill Rentz
  - Town Clerk: Danielle D. Guy

Area
  - Total: 4.62 sq mi (11.97 km^{2})
  - Land: 4.40 sq mi (11.40 km^{2})
  - Water: 0.22 sq mi (0.57 km^{2})
- Elevation: 125 ft (38 m)

Population (2020)
  - Total: 1,699
  - Density: 386/sq mi (149.1/km^{2})
- Time zone: UTC-6 (Central (CST))
  - Summer (DST): UTC-5 (CDT)
- ZIP code: 32460
- Area code(s): 850, 448
- FIPS code: 12-66725
- GNIS feature ID: 2407359
- Website: www.sneadsfl.com

Sneads is a town in Jackson County, Florida, United States, in the Florida panhandle of North Florida. The population was 1,849 at the 2020 census.

== History ==
The community was initially settled as Pope's Store from May 15, 1829 to 1837, during the Spanish Florida era to when it eventually became the Florida Territory under American rule. Between 1837 to around the 1870s, it was called Gloucester. It was renamed as Snead's Store from the 1870s to 1883, when its name was changed yet again to Snead's Station, before ultimately being shortened to the Town of Sneads when it was officially incorporated as a municipality on October 26, 1894. It's the fourth largest municipality in Jackson County, following Marianna (the county seat), Graceville and Malone.

== Geography ==
According to the United States Census Bureau, the town has a total area of 4.6 square miles (12 km^{2}), of which 4.4 square miles (11 km^{2}) is land and 0.2 square miles (0.52 km^{2}) (4.54%) is water.

=== Climate ===
The climate in this area is characterized by hot, humid summers and generally mild winters. According to the Köppen climate classification, the Town of Sneads has a humid subtropical climate zone (Cfa).

== Demographics ==
Historical population
| Census | Pop. | Note | %± |
|---|---|---|---|
| 1900 | 368 | | — |
| 1910 | 506 | | 37.5% |
| 1920 | 492 | | −2.8% |
| 1930 | 637 | | 29.5% |
| 1940 | 727 | | 14.1% |
| 1950 | 1,074 | | 47.7% |
| 1960 | 1,399 | | 30.3% |
| 1970 | 1,550 | | 10.8% |
| 1980 | 1,690 | | 9.0% |
| 1990 | 1,746 | | 3.3% |
| 2000 | 1,919 | | 9.9% |
| 2010 | 1,849 | | −3.6% |
| 2020 | 1,699 | | −8.1% |
U.S. Decennial Census

=== Racial and ethnic composition ===
Sneads racial composition (Hispanics excluded from racial categories) (NH = Non-Hispanic)
| Race | Pop 2010 | Pop 2020 | % 2010 | % 2020 |
|---|---|---|---|---|
| White (NH) | 1,415 | 1,155 | 76.53% | 67.98% |
| Black or African American (NH) | 342 | 372 | 18.50% | 21.90% |
| Native American or Alaska Native (NH) | 4 | 8 | 0.22% | 0.47% |
| Asian (NH) | 7 | 8 | 0.38% | 0.47% |
| Pacific Islander or Native Hawaiian (NH) | 1 | 1 | 0.06% | 0.05% |
| Some other race (NH) | 5 | 8 | 0.27% | 0.47% |
| Two or more races/Multiracial (NH) | 26 | 79 | 1.41% | 4.65% |
| Hispanic or Latino (any race) | 49 | 68 | 2.65% | 4.00% |
| Total | 1,849 | 1,699 | | |

=== 2020 census ===
As of the 2020 census, Sneads had a population of 1,699. The median age was 42.3 years. 22.9% of residents were under the age of 18 and 22.8% of residents were 65 years of age or older. For every 100 females there were 92.6 males, and for every 100 females age 18 and over there were 85.0 males age 18 and over.

0.0% of residents lived in urban areas, while 100.0% lived in rural areas.

There were 766 households in Sneads, of which 28.6% had children under the age of 18 living in them. Of all households, 35.2% were married-couple households, 22.5% were households with a male householder and no spouse or partner present, and 36.6% were households with a female householder and no spouse or partner present. About 37.2% of all households were made up of individuals and 17.8% had someone living alone who was 65 years of age or older.

There were 878 housing units, of which 12.8% were vacant. The homeowner vacancy rate was 1.7% and the rental vacancy rate was 9.2%.

The 2020 American Community Survey 5-year estimates reported 584 families in the town.

=== 2010 census ===
As of the 2010 United States census, there were 1,849 people, 862 households, and 512 families residing in the town.

=== 2000 census ===
As of the census of 2000, there were 1,919 people, 796 households, and 554 families residing in the town. The population density was 434.0 inhabitants per square mile (167.6/km^{2}). There were 887 housing units at an average density of 200.6 per square mile (77.5/km^{2}). The racial makeup of the town was 79.05% White, 16.78% African American, 0.89% Native American, 0.10% Asian, 1.93% from other races, and 1.25% from two or more races. Hispanic or Latino of any race were 3.34% of the population.

In 2000, there were 796 households, out of which 31.7% had children under the age of 18 living with them, 50.6% were married couples living together, 13.6% had a female householder with no husband present, and 30.4% were non-families. 27.3% of all households were made up of individuals, and 12.6% had someone living alone who was 65 years of age or older. The average household size was 2.41 and the average family size was 2.90.

In 2000, in the town, the population was spread out, with 25.5% under the age of 18, 9.0% from 18 to 24, 26.5% from 25 to 44, 24.5% from 45 to 64, and 14.5% who were 65 years of age or older. The median age was 37 years. For every 100 females, there were 95.8 males. For every 100 females age 18 and over, there were 90.9 males.

In 2000, the median income for a household in the town was $30,690, and the median income for a family was $37,162. Males had a median income of $25,917 versus $23,674 for females. The per capita income for the town was $15,113. About 11.2% of families and 17.2% of the population were below the poverty line, including 27.1% of those under age 18 and 11.0% of those age 65 or over.

== Economy ==
The largest employer in the Sneads area is the Florida Department of Corrections, which operates Appalachee Correctional Institution, located outside the city proper.

== Government ==
Sneads is governed by a five-member town council and a city manager. It has its own police force of eight sworn officers: six full-time officers, an administrative assistant, and three part-time dispatchers. The fire department is all-volunteer.

== Education ==
Public schools in Sneads are served by the Jackson County School Board. Schools located in Sneads include Sneads High School and Sneads Elementary School.
