= Wankard Pooser =

American politician

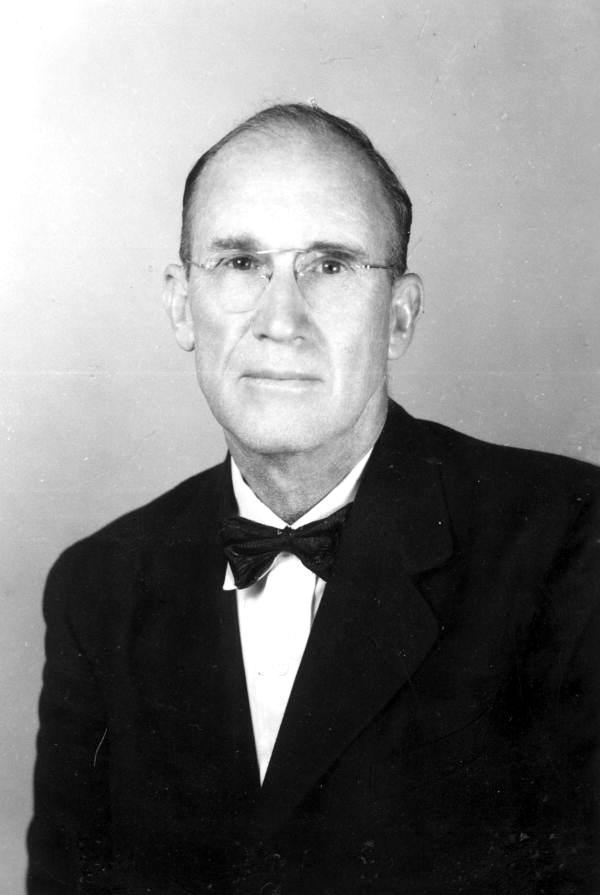

Member of the Florida House of Representatives from the Jackson County district
- In office 1945–1947 Serving with John E. Lambe
- Preceded by: W. L. "Fate" Barefield, B. T. "Tobe" Smith
- Succeeded by: Merrell C. Clark, J. Troy Peacock, Jr.
- In office 1949–1951 Serving with Walter Avant "Pete" Smith
- Preceded by: Merrell C. Clark, J. Troy Peacock, Jr.
- Succeeded by: Hugh Dukes, John L. McFarlin, Jr.

Personal details
- Born: September 27, 1893 DeFuniak Springs, Florida
- Died: February 22, 1978 (aged 84) Jackson County, Florida
- Party: Democratic
- Spouse: Maude Marie Brogdon
- Occupation: moving company owner, farmer, publisher, lawyer, teacher

Wankard Pooser (September 27, 1893 – February 22, 1978) was an American politician in the state of Florida.

Pooser was born in 1893 at DeFuniak Springs, Florida. He attended public schools in the area. He was later a farmer, lawyer, schoolteacher, mover, and newspaper publisher. He ran the Times-courier in Marianna from 1947 to 1951 and another publication entitled Wankard Pooser's Bumblebee – The Paper With A Sting, which ceased publication in 1958.

Residing in Marianna, Florida, he was elected to the Florida House of Representatives to represent Jackson County in 1944, with his term starting in 1945. It was said that his legislative goals were to "curb the growing tendency toward dictatorship in American Government, and to put some brakes on run-a-way taxes". He also made a campaign promise to reject every single bill that was presented to him, a promise which he would only stray from once in his legislative career. In the 1945 legislative session, Pooser was involved in an incident in which he introduced a law in the house calling for additional regulation at Jackson County hospitals. When the bill was opposed by fellow member John Lambe, Pooser brought up the fact that Lambe's newborn child had died at a hospital earlier that week, causing Lambe to "break down" and withdraw from the debate. Pooser later apologized and requested to be excused from further attendance in that legislative session. Also notably, upon the passing of a sales tax bill in the house, Pooser dropped to the chamber floor and started praying for the taxpayers of Florida.

Pooser was a critic of economic policy, with a newspaper describing him as a "stormy petrel of the economy bloc". He was also a vocal critic of the administration of the Governor of Florida, Fuller Warren. In 1946, Pooser was an unsuccessful candidate for the Florida State Senate; in that same election, his wife, Maude also ran unsuccessfully for the State House of Representatives. Pooser was defeated in 1949 for his seat in the house, and left the seat in 1950. He attempted a comeback in 1952, but was defeated in a primary by Hugh Dukes by a margin of 24 votes.

He was married to Maude Marie Brogdon at Jackson County on August 15, 1915, and with her had eleven children. Pooser died at Jackson County in 1978 and was buried at Pope Cemetery in Sneads, Jackson County, Florida. He was predeceased by his wife, who died December 15, 1966, at the age of 68. In a 1958 article, Pooser referred to himself as a "famous author, statesman, [and] poet". It was also said that he was known around his city of residence as a "lawyer, ex-legislator, ... noted local after-dinner speaker, wit, [and] critic".
