= Alliance Auxiliary Field =

Alliance Auxiliary Army Airfield
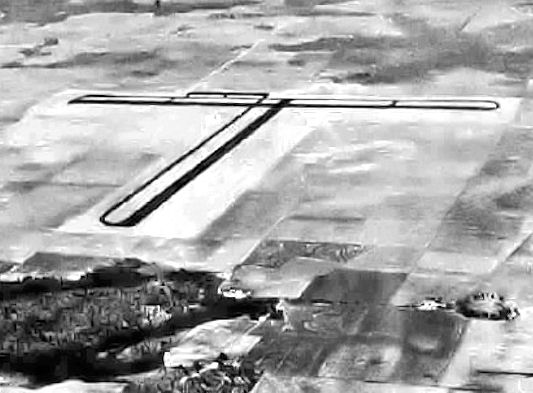
- 23 July 1943
- IATA: none; ICAO: none

Summary
- Serves: Marianna, Florida
- Coordinates: 30°35′59″N 085°06′36″W

Map
- Location of Alliance Auxiliary Field

Alliance Auxiliary Army Airfield is a closed military airfield. It was located 14 miles southeast of Marianna, Florida.

== History ==
Originally constructed by the United States Army Air Forces in 1943 as one of four auxiliary airfields for the pilot training school at Marianna Army Airfield. Its original designation was Alliance Auxiliary Army Airfield #4. The airfield was constructed with two asphalt 5'000 foot runways, each with a parallel taxiway.

The airfield was apparently unmanned, had no buildings nor any permanent units assigned. It was used for emergency and for touch-and-go landings as part of the pilot training school. With the end of World War II and the closure of Mariana AAF in 1945, the airfield was closed and abandoned.

In the years since, the airfield concrete and asphalt has been removed and today the land is in private ownership, being used for agriculture. Aerial imagery shows no trace of the facility, and a county farm road was constructed over the former military airfield. A small crop-dusting airstrip (County Line Airstrip Airport (FL35)) was constructed in 2008 about a mile to the northeast, but it has no relationship to the former military airfield.

== See also ==
- Florida World War II Army Airfields
