= Graham Air Base =

Airport in Florida, U.S.

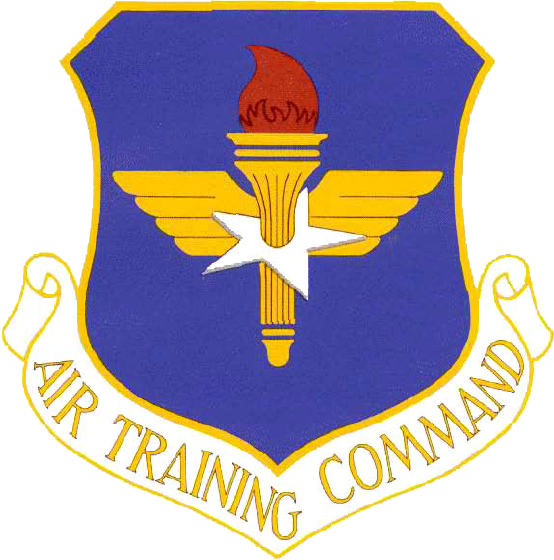
Graham Air Base Marianna Army Airfield
- Part of Air Training Command (ATC)
- Located near Marianna, Florida
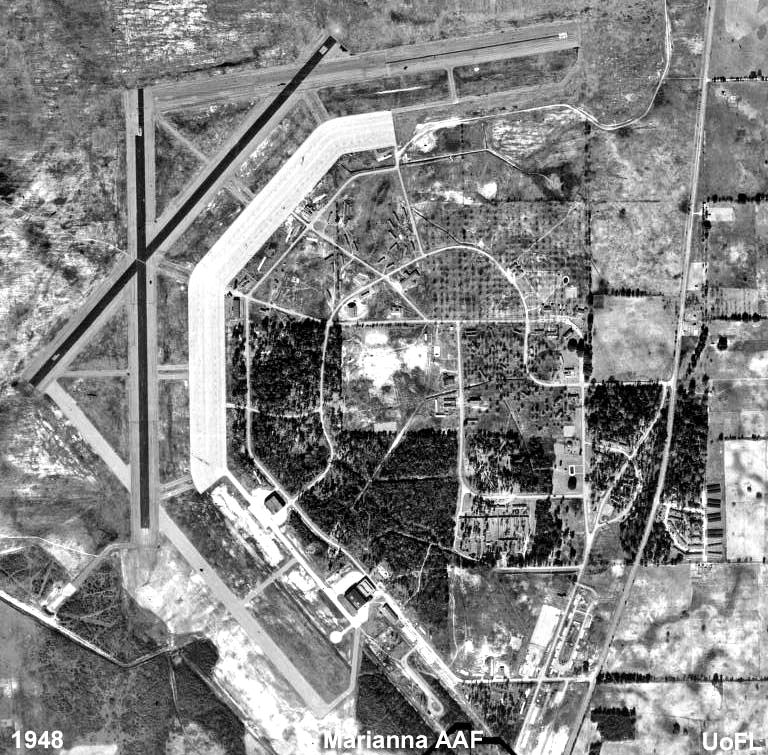
- Marianna Army Air Field – 1948

Site information
- Type: Air Force Base
- Controlled by: United States Air Force

Location
- Location within the United States Location within Florida
- Coordinates: 30°50′16″N 85°10′55″W

Site history
- Built: 1942
- In use: 1942–1945; 1953–1961

Garrison information
- Garrison: Air Training Command
- Occupants: 17th Single Engine Flying Training Group (1942–1945); 3300th Pilot Training Group (1953–1961)

Graham Air Base was a United States Air Force base located in Marianna, Florida. After it was closed in 1960, it was reused as Marianna Municipal Airport.

== History ==
=== Marianna Army Airfield ===
The federal government acquired the airport at the city of Marianna in 1942 and added 1,915 acres (7.7 km^{2}) additional in order to construct the Marianna Army Air Field for the U.S. Army Air Forces. The airfield opened on 8 August 1942 and eventually had six hard surface runways averaging 4,000 feet (1,200 m) in length and was a training base for the Southeast Army Air Force Training Command. In addition to the main airfield, Marianna AAF also had the following known sub-bases and auxiliaries

- Ellis Auxiliary Field 30°54′44″N 085°15′23″W
- Malone Auxiliary Field 30°59′44″N 085°10′06″W
- Bascom Auxiliary Field 30°57′54″N 085°04′09″W
- Alliance Auxiliary Field 30°35′59″N 085°06′36″W

The Army Air Forces Pilot School (Advanced-Single Engine) was activated on 1 September 1942, with the 17th Single Engine Flying Training Group being the Operational Training Unit. Aircraft used during training were P-40 Warhawks and AT-6 Texans. Marianna AAF was transferred from the jurisdiction of Eastern Flying Training Command to Third Air Force on 12 October 1944. The station came under the command of the 137th Army Air Forces Base Unit. With the reassignment to Third Air Force, the mission of the base was changed from the training of pilots for single-engine pursuit fighter aircraft to training of combat crews for the A-26 Invader light bomber aircraft.

After the war ended, the airfield was closed on 15 February 1946 and the Federal Government returned control of 2,010 acres (8.1 km^{2}) to the City of Marianna in 1947.

=== Graham Air Base ===
In 1953, the old Marianna Army Air Field was reactivated as a United States Air Force installation under the Air Training Command (ATC) in response to increased demands for pilots as a result of the Cold War and the associated increase in number of Air Force combat flying wings, especially within the Strategic Air Command. The facility was activated on 27 January 1953 and renamed Graham Air Base for William J. Graham, the school head and senior civilian instructor who provided flight training to pilots. Graham AB replaced Greenville Air Force Base, Mississippi as a contract pilot training school as Greenville AFB became an ATC basic single engine and jet pilot training school.

The 3300th Pilot Training Group (Contract Primary) and the 3300th Pilot Training Squadron was reassigned from Greenville AFB to Graham AB to support the mission, with predominantly civilian instructors providing training in USAF PA-18 Super Cub and AT-6 Texan, and subsequently T-34 Mentor and T-28 Trojan aircraft and briefly, the T-37 Tweet, graduating a group of USAF student pilots from primary training every six weeks. Because its short runways could not readily accommodate the USAF jet trainers of the period, student pilots completing primary training were then assigned to other air force bases with longer runways for more advanced training in aircraft such as the T-33 Shooting Star. Although its instructor cadre was primarily civilian (exclusive of the T-37, which were all USAF instructors), Graham AB was still an Air Force installation with an overall military cadre in command and operated under constant military supervision.

Students were a combination of both commissioned USAF officers and non-commissioned USAF aviation cadets, the latter who would receive their commissions upon completion of flight training. New bachelor officer quarters, cadet barracks and other facilities were built. The air base employed 700 civilians in addition to assigned USAF military cadre and student personnel. Notable graduates of initial pilot training at Graham AB include former Chief of the National Guard Bureau, Lieutenant General Russell C. Davis and former Vice Chief of Staff of the Air Force, General Michael P. C. Carns, who was also a member of the first graduating class of the USAF Academy in 1959.

In June 1958, the Air Force began replacing their prop-driven T-28s with the first T-37 Tweet jet trainers and, by 1960, the Air Force was fully committed to transitioning to the Undergraduate Pilot Training (UPT) concept at selected Air Training Command installations with longer runways which would eventually host both the T-37 Tweet and the new T-38 Talon jet trainers. Facilities like Graham AB, with civilian contractor instructors and short runways became obsolete and were eventually closed in the early 1960s.

The Air Force closed Graham AB in late 1960, despite efforts of influential Florida Congressman Robert L. F. Sikes to keep it running. As the installation was being scaled down as a military facility, the industrial committee of the Junior Chamber of Commerce worked to adapt the air base into a combination industrial park and civilian airport. The 3300th Training Squadron was inactivated on 1 February 1961 and the base's air traffic control tower permanently closed. ATC wanted to close the base in March, but an Air Force imposed freeze on shipping property delayed its final closure. However, on 31 August 1961 the base was inactivated as a military installation and turned over to civil control.

=== Civil use ===
Today the airport is known as Marianna Municipal Airport. In addition to its civilian general aviation traffic, the airport continues to see significant use by military aircraft, with one third of the airport's daily operations normally consisting of transient military training flights, primarily Army helicopters from Fort Novosel and Navy helicopters from Naval Air Station Whiting Field.

== See also ==
- Florida World War II Army Airfields
- 28th Flying Training Wing (World War II)
