= Marvin Harvey (American football) =

American football player (born 1959)

No. 83, 87
- Position: Tight end

Personal information
- Born: October 17, 1959 (age 67); Donalsonville, Georgia, U.S.
- Listed height: 6 ft 3 in (1.91 m)
- Listed weight: 220 lb (100 kg)

Career information
- High school: Marianna (Marianna, Florida)
- College: Southern Miss
- NFL draft: 1981: 3rd round, 70th overall pick

Career history
- Kansas City Chiefs (1981); Tampa Bay Bandits (1984-1985)

Career NFL statistics
- Games played: 7
- Stats at Pro Football Reference

Marvin Dwight Harvey (born October 17, 1959) is an American former professional football player who was a tight end in the National Football League (NFL). Harvey was selected in the third round by the Kansas City Chiefs out of the University of Southern Mississippi in the 1981 NFL draft with the 70th overall pick. He retired after a neck injury, but later returned to the NFL and played for Tampa Bay for a short period before joining the USFL from 1983 to 1985. He married Benita "Bonnie" Marshall in 1981. The following year she founded the NFL Player's Wives Association with the support of Al Davis and Ed. DeBartolo Jr. The association was run out the NFLPA office in San Francisco, which was headed by Eugene Upshaw. Harvey and Marshall divorced in 1985 and remain friends.

Marvin is currently a Florida State Trooper living in Tallahassee, Florida. He dedicates his free time to helping teens and young boys to excel in life.
