= Marianna High School =

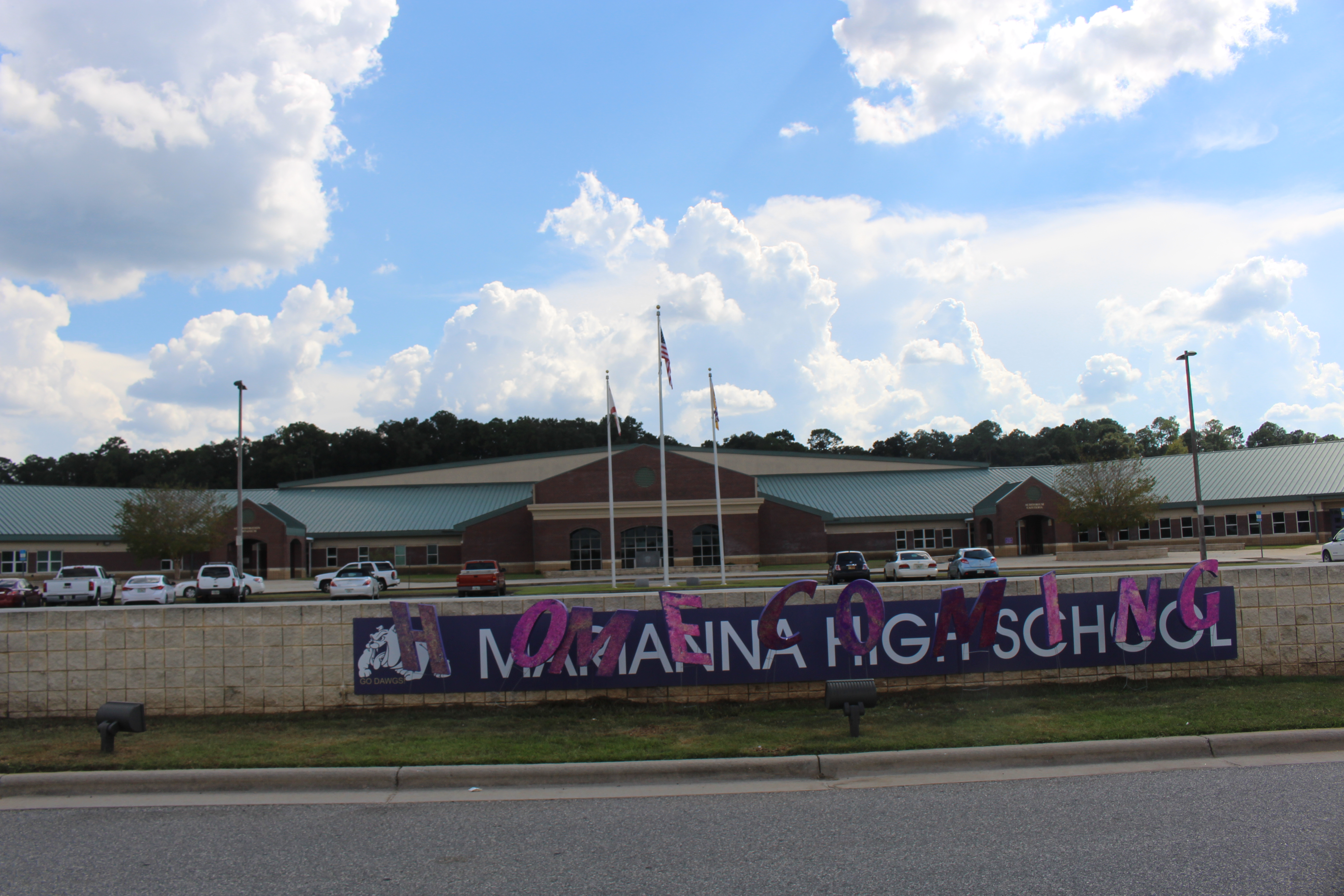

Location
- 3547 Caverns Road; Marianna, Florida 32446; United States
- 30.7821371°N 85.2368738°W

Information
- School type: Public High School
- Founded: 1927
- School board: Jackson County School Board
- Superintendent: Steve Benton
- Principal: Aaron Day
- Assistant Principal: Aron Day
- Assistant Principal: Travis Blanton
- Staff: 46
- Faculty: 34.00 (FTE)
- Grades: 9–12
- Enrollment: 634 (2022-23)
- Student to teacher ratio: 18.65
- Language: English
- Campus: Rural
- Colors: Purple and Gold
- Mascot: Bulldog
- Yearbook: Majaflo
- Website: Marianna High School Online

Marianna High School is a public high school in Marianna, Florida. It enrolls 657 students in grades 9–12, and is the largest of five high schools in the Jackson County School Board. It is accredited by the Southern Association of Colleges and Schools.

Marianna High School offers technical and academic courses, dual enrollment, early admission to Chipola College, and in 2007 became the only school in the district to offer Advanced Placement.

== History ==
Marianna High School was built in 1926.

In 1939, about 500 students walked out of their classes in protest after the school board failed to reappoint their principal, E.T. Denmark. The students marched along city streets carrying placards and refused to return to class until their principal was reappointed.

Fire destroyed the school's industrial arts building in 1970. No one was injured, and faulty wiring was blamed.

The school gained media attention in 1972 after 5 black students were expelled following a fight. This led to a protest march on the state capital, and brought focus to racial tensions at the school.

In 1987, a student was stabbed to death during a fight with a classmate, and the following year a student was found in possession of a handgun and crack cocaine. As a result, principals in all Jackson County high schools were provided with metal detectors.

Construction of a new Marianna High School began in 2001, and was completed in June 2005. The following month, prior to opening to students, the new school—equipped with standby generators and designed to withstand a category 5 hurricane—sheltered evacuees fleeing Hurricane Dennis. The new school building was 177,000 square feet (16,400 m^{2}), occupied 62 acres (25 ha), and cost $21 million.

== Extracurricular activities ==
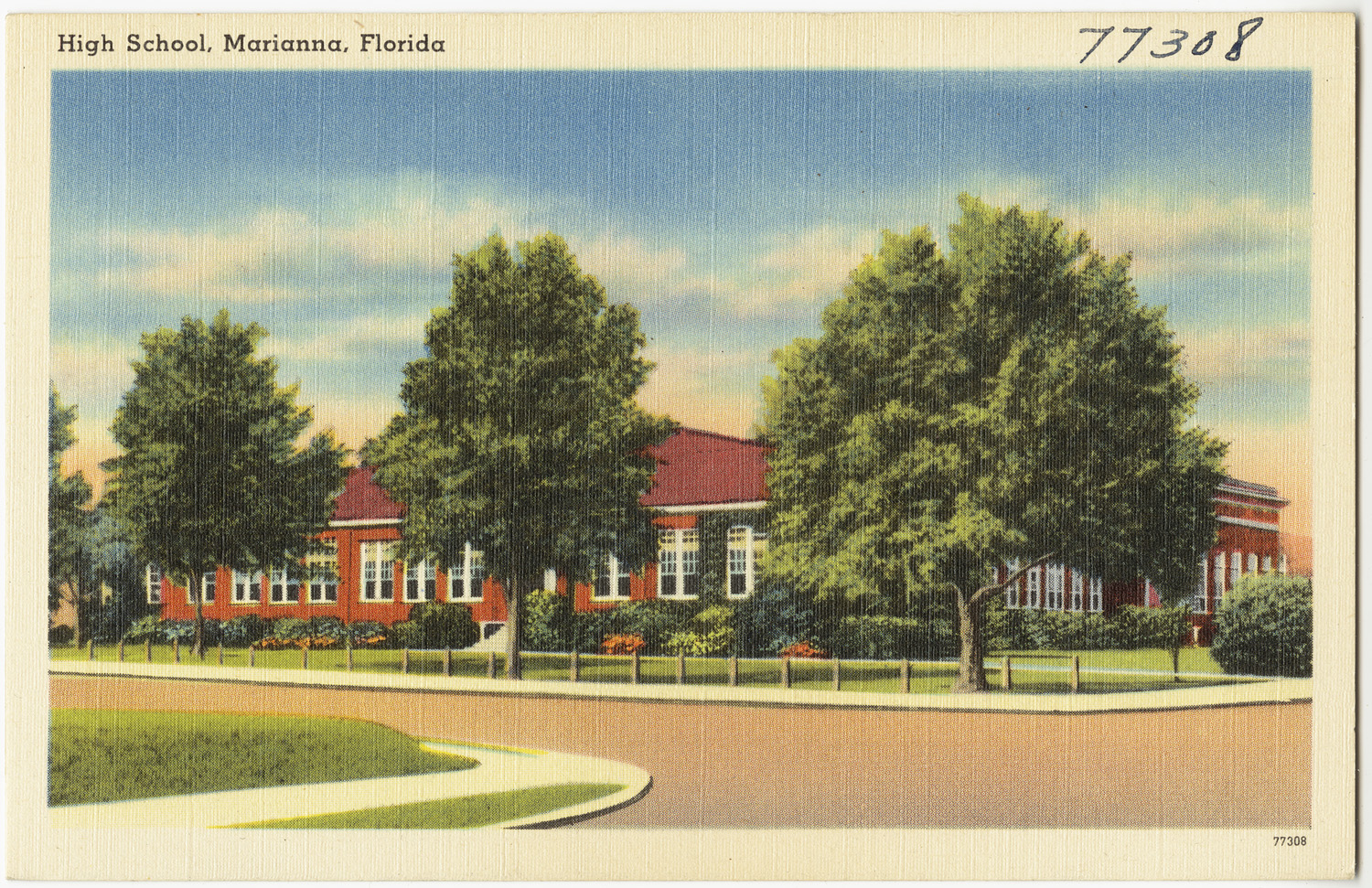
Original Marianna High School, c. 1930

- Afro-Activette (no longer running)
- Anchor Club
- Band
- Chorus (no longer running)
- Debating Club (founded in 2006, end date unknown)
- Fellowship of Christian Athletes
- Florida Forensic League
- Future Business Leaders of America
- Future Farmers of America
- Green Teen Organization (founded in 2007)
- Majaflo Yearbook
- National Beta Club
- National Honor Society
- Physics Club (no longer running)
- Student Government Association
- The Growler student newspaper
- Thespian Club (no longer running)
- Technology Student Association
- The Diversity Club

== Sports teams ==
- Baseball
- Basketball
- Cheerleading
- Cross Country
- Football
- Golf
- Soccer
- Softball
- Track & Field
- Girls Volleyball
- Weightlifting
- Wrestling

== Dawg Bytes ==
Marianna High School had a weekly show named Dawg Bytes that aired on Fridays. Dawg Bytes was Discontinued during the 2020-21 school year but is still listed on the school website with all episodes still available to watch.

== Notable alumni ==
- Marvin Harvey, professional football player.
- James W. Kynes, professional football player, lawyer, corporate executive, and Florida Attorney General.
- Danny Lipford, television personality and producer of home improvement television and radio shows
- Jeff Mathis, professional baseball player.
- Bud Whitehead, professional football player.
- Doug Woodlief, professional football player.
