= Ellis Auxiliary Field =

Ellis Auxiliary Army Airfield
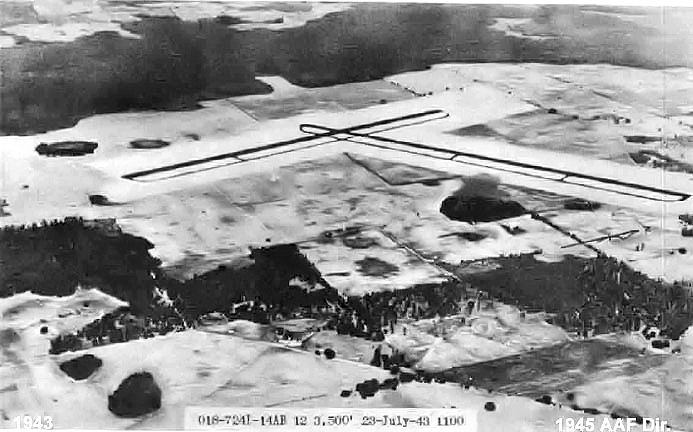
- 23 July 1943
- IATA: none; ICAO: none

Summary
- Serves: Marianna, Florida
- Coordinates: 30°54′44″N 085°15′23″W

Map
- Location of Ellis Auxiliary Field

Ellis Auxiliary Army Airfield is a closed military airfield. It was located 9.7 miles north of Marianna, Florida, United States.

== History ==
Originally constructed by the United States Army Air Forces in 1942 as one of four auxiliary airfields for the pilot training school at Marianna Army Airfield, its original designation was Ellis Auxiliary Army Airfield #1. The airfield was constructed with two asphalt 5,000-foot runways, each with a parallel taxiway.

The airfield was apparently unmanned, and had no buildings nor any permanent units assigned. It was used for emergency and for touch-and-go landings as part of the pilot training school. With the end of World War II and the closure of Mariana AAF in 1945, the airfield was closed and abandoned.

In the years since, the airfield concrete and asphalt have been removed and today the land is in private ownership, being used for agriculture. Aerial imagery shows one small section of the southeast/northwest runway derelict and overgrown.

== See also ==
- Florida World War II Army Airfields
