= Malone Auxiliary Field =

Malone Air Force Auxiliary Airfield
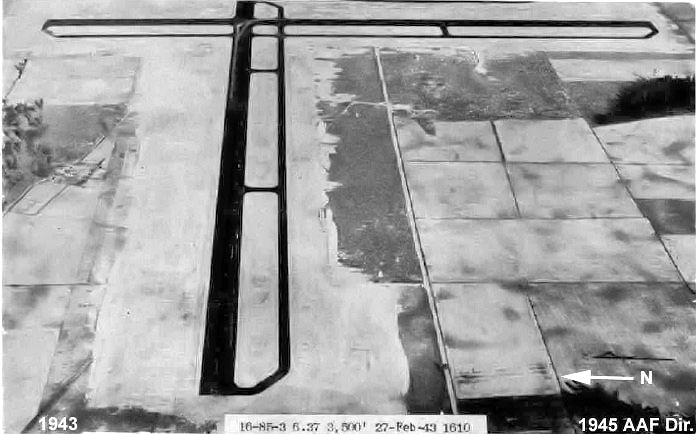
- 27 February 1943
- IATA: none; ICAO: none

Summary
- Serves: Marianna, Florida
- Coordinates: 30°59′44″N 085°10′06″W

Map
- Location of Malone Auxiliary Field

Malone Auxiliary Army Airfield is a closed military airfield. It was located 15.7 miles north-northeast of Marianna, Florida.

== History ==
Originally constructed by the United States Army Air Forces in 1942 as one of four auxiliary airfields for the pilot training school at Marianna Army Airfield. Its original designation was Malone Auxiliary Army Airfield #2. The airfield was constructed with two asphalt 5,000 foot runways, each with a parallel taxiway.

The airfield was apparently unmanned, had no buildings nor any permanent units assigned. It was used for emergency and for touch-and-go landings as part of the pilot training school. With the end of World War II and the closure of Mariana AAF in 1945, the airfield was closed and abandoned.

With the reopening of Mariana AAF as Graham Air Base in 1950 as a contract pilot training school, Bascom was rehabilitated as an auxiliary airfield for Graham (Graham #2) and was used for emergency landings. It was closed again in 1961 with the final closure of Graham AB and again abandoned.

Today the former airfield is visible in aerial imagery and is derelict with most of the former asphalt and concrete deteriorating. Sections have been removed but it mostly is abandoned to the elements. It is in private ownership.

== See also ==
- Florida World War II Army Airfields
