= Grand Ridge High School =

Public school in Florida, United States

Grand Ridge School

Location
- 6925 Florida Street; Grand Ridge, Florida; United States; 30.7076925°N 85.0179792°W

Information
- Type: Public
- Motto: “Success For Everyone, The Sky's the Limit”
- Established: 1887
- Principal: Laura Kent
- Faculty: 31
- Grades: 5–8
- Enrollment: 329 (2023-2024)
- Colors: Gray and royal blue
- Mascot: American Indian
- Nickname: Indians
- Yearbook: The Indian
- Website: grs.jcsb.org

Grand Ridge is located in Northwest Florida (The Panhandle), 45 minutes west of Tallahassee and 40 minutes southeast of Dothan, Alabama.

Grand Ridge High School functioned as an all grades school from its founding in 1887 until the end of the 2005–2006 school year, when it was consolidated with neighboring Sneads High School, becoming a Pre-K through 8th grade Public Unit School with an enrollment of 600 students. It is part of the Jackson County in School Board System, and is under the supervision of Laura Kent, Principal. AssistantPrincipals are Travis Blanton and Amber Tucker.
