= Today's Homeowner with Danny Lipford =

- Genre: Home Improvement
- Starring: Danny Lipford (Host); Chelsea Lipford Wolf (Co-host); Allen Lyle (1998 until 2017); Joe Truini (Simple Solutions); Jodi Marks (Best New Products)
- Country of origin: United States
- No. of seasons: 25

Production
- Executive producer: Danny Lipford
- Running time: 30 minutes
- Production company: 3 Echoes Productions

Original release
- Network: Syndication
- Release: 1988 – September 3, 2023

Today's Homeowner with Danny Lipford
- Genre: Home Improvement
- Running time: 2 hours
- Country of origin: United States
- Starring: Danny Lipford; Allen Lyle; Amy Dodsworth
- Executive producer: Danny Lipford
- Original release: ~1998 as Homefront with Don Zeman; January 17, 2009 as Homefront with Danny Lipford; September 22, 2012 as Today's Homeowner with Danny Lipford

Today's Homeowner with Danny Lipford was a weekly home improvement television program, weekly radio program and weekly podcast, hosted by Danny Lipford.

== Television ==
Danny Lipford first hosted a local cable home improvement program, Remodeling Today, in Mobile, in 1988. The program would grow throughout the region, with nearly 25 affiliates by 1997. In 1998, Lipford was reached by Today's Homeowner magazine to partner for a nationally syndicated program. The program premiered in June 1998 as Today's Homeowner with Danny Lipford. Soon after, the program was syndicated to over 100 television markets. In 2001, AOL Time Warner bought the Times Mirror magazine group and discontinued the magazine. Lipford licensed the Today's Homeowner brand and took over the show again. By 2013, Today's Homeowner aired on over 210 stations nationwide. In 2008, it was nominated for a Daytime Emmy Award in Outstanding Special Class Writing. And again in 2022 it was nominated for Multi-Camera Editing.

After 25 years on televisions nationwide, owner and president Danny Lipford decided to discontinue new episodes. The last episode aired in September 2023.

== Radio ==
In 2009, Lipford took over the radio program Homefront after the death of longtime host and founder Don Zeman. Along with co-hosts Allen Lyle and Amy Dodsworth, Lipford interviews special guests, answers caller questions and shares tales from the world of home improvement. On September 22, 2012, the title of the radio program was changed to reflect the television show. The program was available on radio stations throughout the United States until it aired its last episode in December 2023.

== Retirement and Ending of Today's Homeowner ==
In June 2023, Danny Lipford announced that he would be retiring from Today's Homeowner media and that he would be passing the reins to his daughter Chelsea. The TV series will continue to air until September 3, 2023, while the radio show including its feature vignettes will continue to air until the end of 2023.
