= Sneads High School =

Coordinates: 30.7096364°N 84.9218663°W

Location
- 8066 Old Spanish Trail; Sneads, Florida; United States

Information
- Type: Public
- Motto: "Academic Excellence...Today...Tomorrow...Together"
- Established: 1881
- Principal: Steve Dewitt
- Teaching staff: 22.00 (FTE)
- Grades: 9-12
- Enrollment: 357 (2023-2024)
- Student to teacher ratio: 16.23
- Colors: Blue and Gold
- Mascot: Phillipe the Pirate
- Yearbook: Pirates Treasure
- Website: Official website

Established in 1881, Sneads High School is a high school with grades 9–12. It is located in the rural countryside of Sneads, west of Tallahassee, in Jackson County, Florida. This school is administered by the Jackson County School Board and is one of 5 high schools in the county.

As of 2017 Sneads High has 389 total students and a graduation rate of 78%

The neighboring communities of Sneads and Grand Ridge combined their high schools and middle schools beginning with the 2006–2007 school year. Grades 9–12 at Grand Ridge were added to the Sneads High School and the 6-8 grades at Sneads High are now at Grand Ridge, Sneads retained its elementary school, as did Grand Ridge.

Community members had been opposed to the merger of these local rivals, especially those whose children would have completed their educations at Grand Ridge High School, but the transition went smoothly, with the only real challenge being the school bus routes and schedules.

Ashleigh Lollie, a 2009 graduate of Sneads High School, will be the 2015 Miss Florida USA.

Sneads High School is nationally recognized by U.S. News & World Report and received a bronze medal in 2017 for exceptional state required test scores and student college readiness.

As of 2021, the Sneads High School Girls Varsity Volleyball team have won the last nine FHSAA state 1A championships.

== School fires ==
Since its construction in 1881, Sneads High School has burned down three separate times first in 1912, then in 1939, and most recently in 1991 when lightning struck doing and estimated $2,000,000 in damages. The school's library, guidance office, band room, two gyms, the agriculture building and cafeteria remained standing after the fire and were converted into classrooms until new ones could be built.

== Recent additions ==
A new agricultural building was completed just before the start of the 2011 school year.

In August 2013, a memorial fountain was built to commemorate the death of four students.

In February 2015, the SHS cafeteria re-opened after several months of renovations costing more than $800,000. The cafeteria, now over 60 years old, is 800 square feet larger and it provides a more secure dining patio, providing more room for its growing student base.
