= Sam Parish =

Sam E. Parish
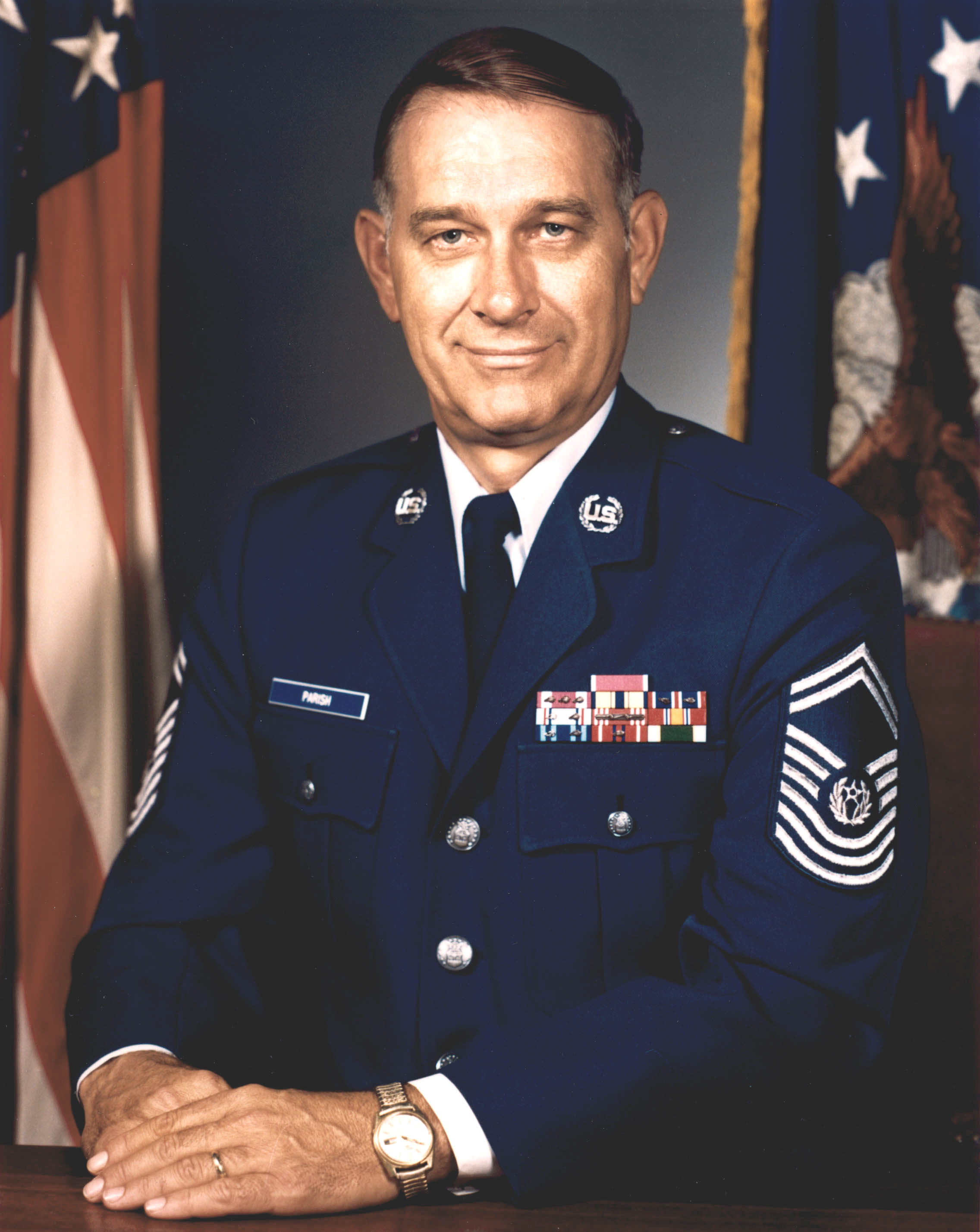
- Parish c. 1983
- Born: October 2, 1937 (age 89); Marianna, Florida, US
- Military career
- Branch: United States Air Force
- Service years: 1955–1986
- Rank: Chief Master Sergeant of the Air Force
- Awards: Air Force Distinguished Service Medal; Legion of Merit (2); Meritorious Service Medal (4); Air Force Commendation Medal

Sam E. Parish (born October 2, 1937) is a retired Chief Master Sergeant of the United States Air Force who served as the 8th Chief Master Sergeant of the Air Force from 1983 to 1986.

== Early life ==
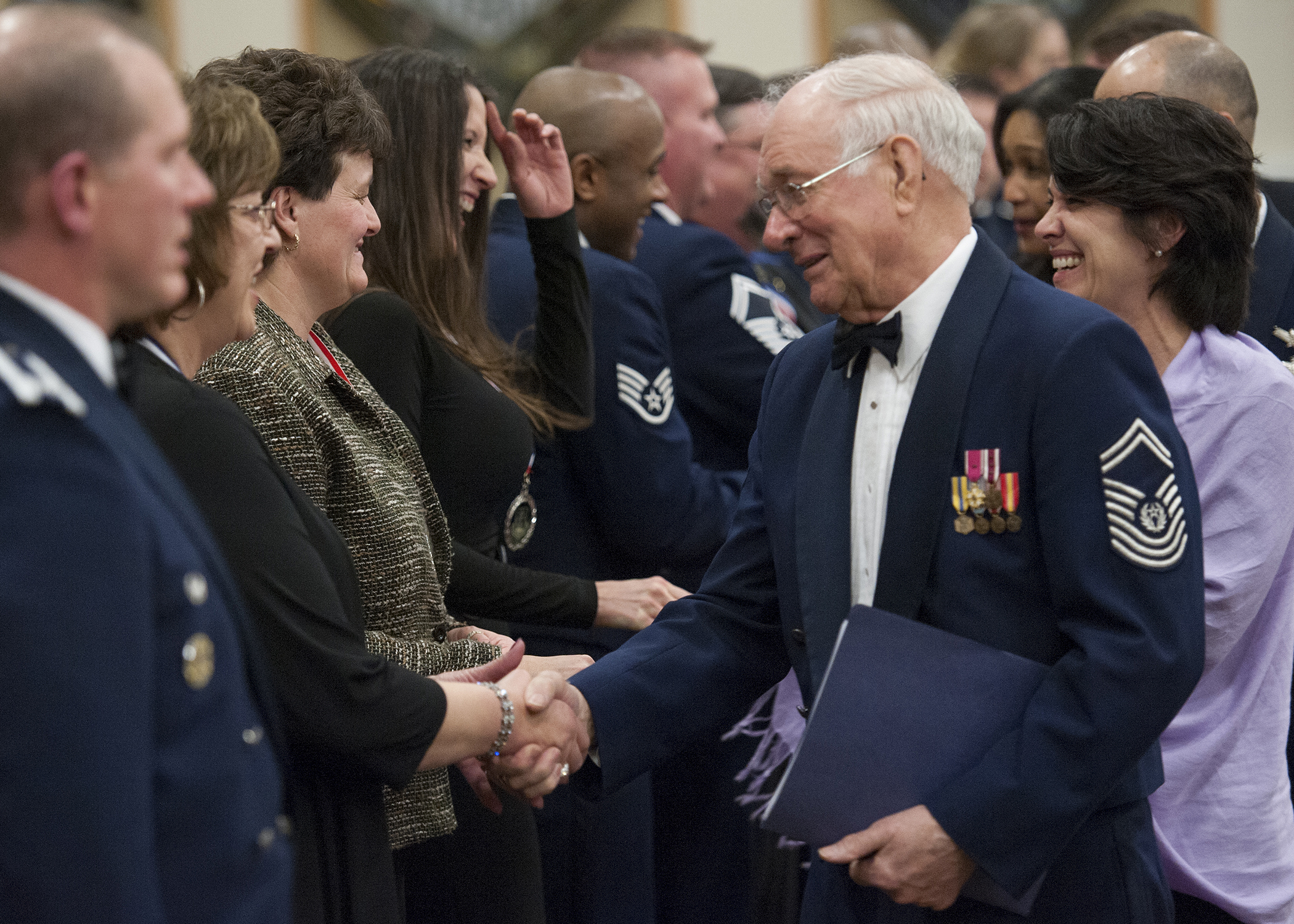
Parish congratulates Civilian Supervisor of the Year Category 2 Award Winner Annette Terry at Malmstron Air Force Base in February 2013.

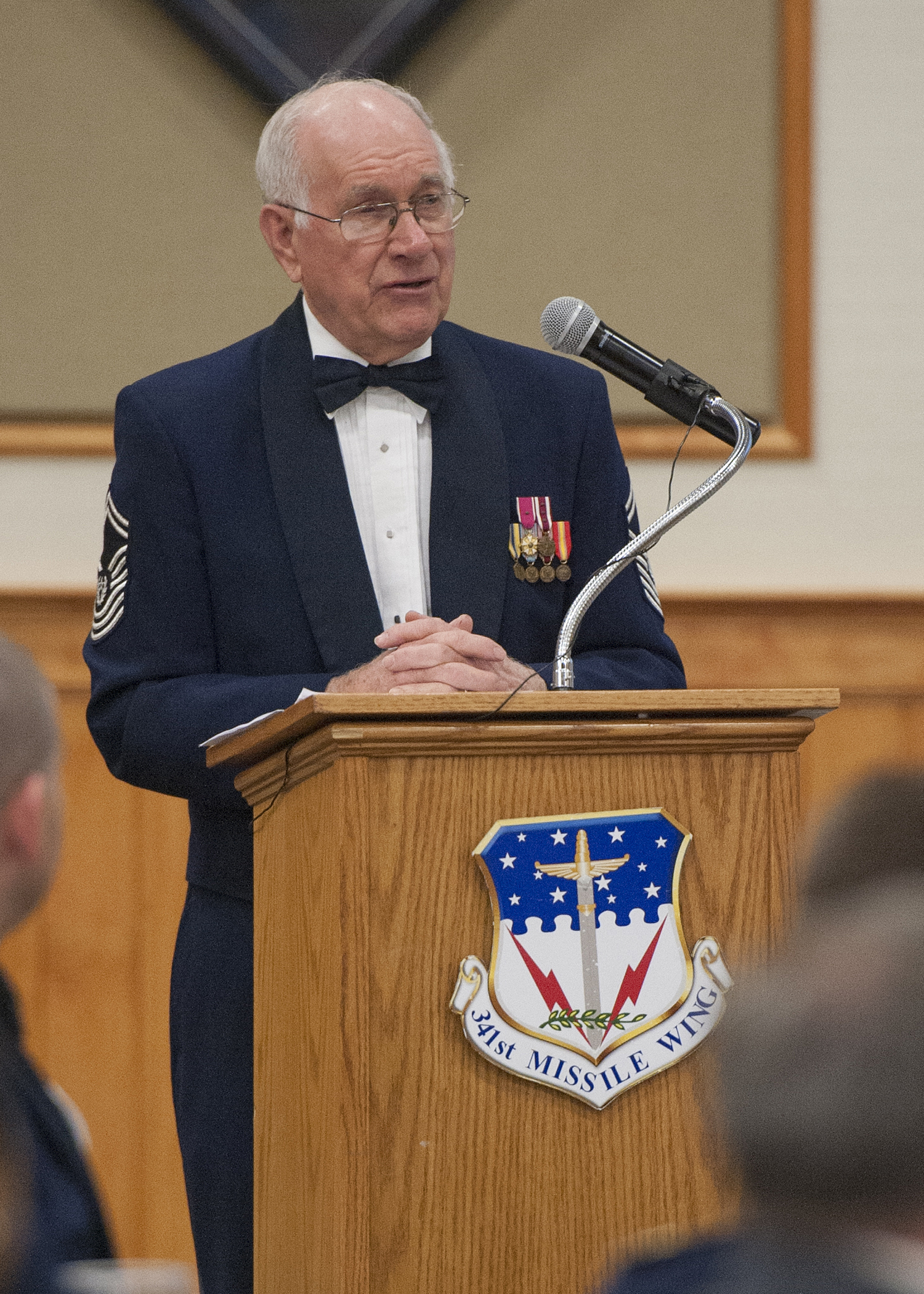
Parish speaks to members of Team Malmstrom during the 2012 Annual Awards Banquet at the Grizzly Bend in February 2013.

Parish was born in Marianna, Florida, and attended Malone High School. He joined the United States Air Force in December 1954.

== Military career ==
Following basic military training, Parish was assigned to Chanute Air Force Base, Illinois, for training as a ground weather equipment operator where earned distinction as an honor graduate. His early assignments include Germany, Massachusetts, and Illinois. In March 1973, Parish graduated from the first class of the Senior Noncommissioned Officer Academy at Gunter Air Force Station, Alabama. One of his classmates was James M. McCoy, who in August 1979 would be appointed as one of Parish's predecessors as the sixth Chief Master Sergeant of the Air Force. In August 1976, he began his third tour of duty in West Germany as sergeant major for the 36th Combat Support Group consolidated base personnel office at Bitburg Air Base, Germany. His career included tours as Senior Enlisted Advisor for 40th Air Division, US Air Forces in Europe, and Strategic Air Command.

Parish served as the Chief Master Sergeant of the Air Force from August 1983 to June 1986.

== Awards and decorations ==
Personal decorations
	Air Force Distinguished Service Medal
Width-44 crimson ribbon with a pair of width-2 white stripes on the edges	Legion of Merit with bronze oak leaf cluster
	Meritorious Service Medal with three bronze oak leaf clusters
	Air Force Commendation Medal
Unit awards
	Air Force Outstanding Unit Award with Valor device and silver oak leaf cluster
Service awards
	Air Force Good Conduct Medal with silver and three bronze oak leaf clusters
	Army Good Conduct Medal
Campaign and service medals
Width=44 scarlet ribbon with a central width-4 golden yellow stripe, flanked by pairs of width-1 scarlet, white, Old Glory blue, and white stripes	National Defense Service Medal
Service, training, and marksmanship awards
	Air Force Longevity Service Award with silver and bronze oak leaf clusters
	NCO Professional Military Education Graduate Ribbon with two bronze oak leaf clusters
	Small Arms Expert Marksmanship Ribbon
	Air Force Training Ribbon

=== Professional memberships and associations ===
- Life member, Air Force Association
- Air Force Sergeants Association
- Retired Enlisted Association
- Director, Airmen Memorial Museum
- Army and Air Force Mutual Aid Association
- Air University Board of Visitors

Military offices
Preceded by Arthur L. Andrews	Chief Master Sergeant of the Air Force; 1983–1986	Succeeded by James C. Binnicker
