= Graceville High School =

Secondary school in Florida, United States

Coordinates: 30.9725°N 85.5070°W

Location
- 5539 Brown Street; Graceville, (Jackson County), Florida 32440; United States

Information
- Type: Public high school
- School district: Jackson County School Board
- Principal: Carlan Martin
- Staff: 33.00 (FTE)
- Enrollment: 474 (2023-2024)
- Student to teacher ratio: 14.36
- Colors: Black and orange
- Nickname: Tigers

Graceville High School is a public high school in Graceville, Florida. The school's teams compete with the Tigers mascot and the school colors are black, orange, and white. The school opened in 1885. In 2021, Graceville High School was ranked 516-602nd within Florida. The total minority enrollment is 60%, and 50% of students are economically disadvantaged. Florida Supreme Court Justice Ricky Polston was valedictorian of his class of 1973.
