= North American Farms Airport =

Private airport in Florida, U.S.

North American Farms Airport Bascom Air Force Auxiliary Field
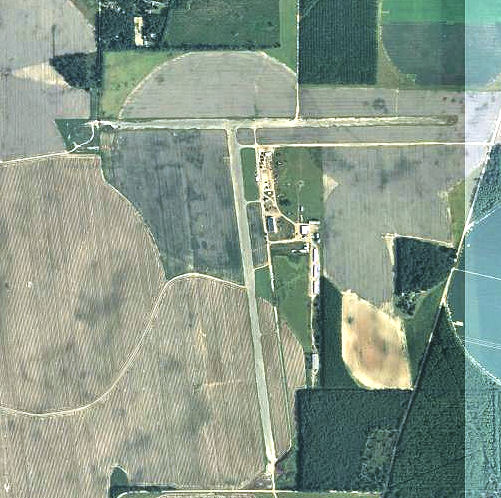
- 2006 USGS airphoto

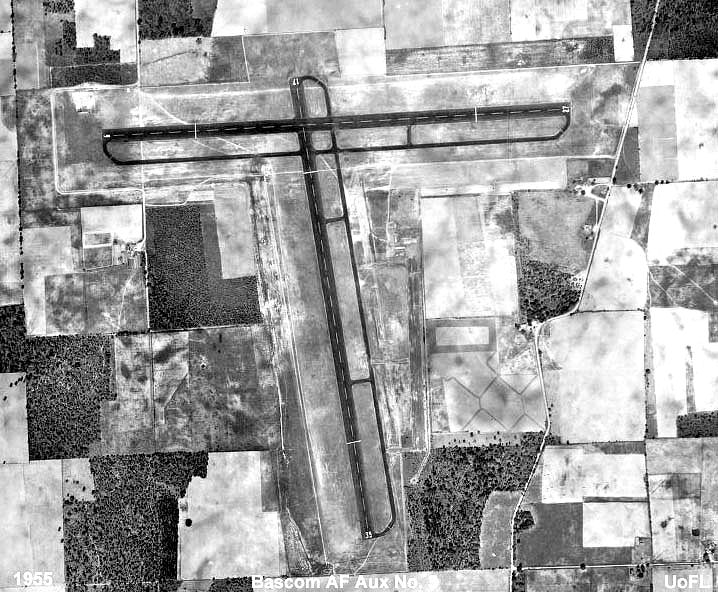
- Bascom Air Force Auxiliary Field - 1955
- IATA: none; ICAO: none; FAA LID: 56FD

Summary
- Serves: Malone, Florida
- Coordinates: 30°57′54″N 085°04′09″W

Map
- Location of North American Farms Airport

Runways
Direction	Length		Surface
Direction	ft	m	Surface
18/36	4,400	1,341	asphalt

North American Farms Airport (FAA LID: 56FD) is a private airport, located 5.6 miles east of Malone, Florida.

== Overview ==
Opened in March 1992, the airport is used for crop dusting operations and the owner's private use.

== History ==
Originally constructed by the United States Army Air Forces in 1943 as one of four auxiliary airfields for the pilot training school at Marianna Army Airfield. Its original designation was Bascom Auxiliary Army Airfield #3. The airfield was constructed with two asphalt 5'000 foot runways, each with a parallel taxiway.

The airfield was apparently unmanned, had no buildings nor any permanent units assigned. It was used for emergency and for touch-and-go landings as part of the pilot training school. With the end of World War II and the closure of Mariana AAF, the airfield was closed and abandoned.

With the reopening of Mariana AAF as Grahm Air Base in 1950 as a contract pilot training school, Bascom was rehabilitated as an auxiliary airfield for Grahm (Grahm #1) and was used for emergency landings. It was closed again in 1961 with the final closure of Grahm AB and again abandoned.

Today, only a section of the north–south runway of the former airfield's runway is in use, the asphalt surface being in marginal condition. The remainder of the airfield has had either the asphalt and concrete removed with the east–west runway lying derelict. It is not open to any general aviation.

== See also ==
- Florida World War II Army Airfields
