= Marianna Municipal Airport =

Airport in Florida, U.S.

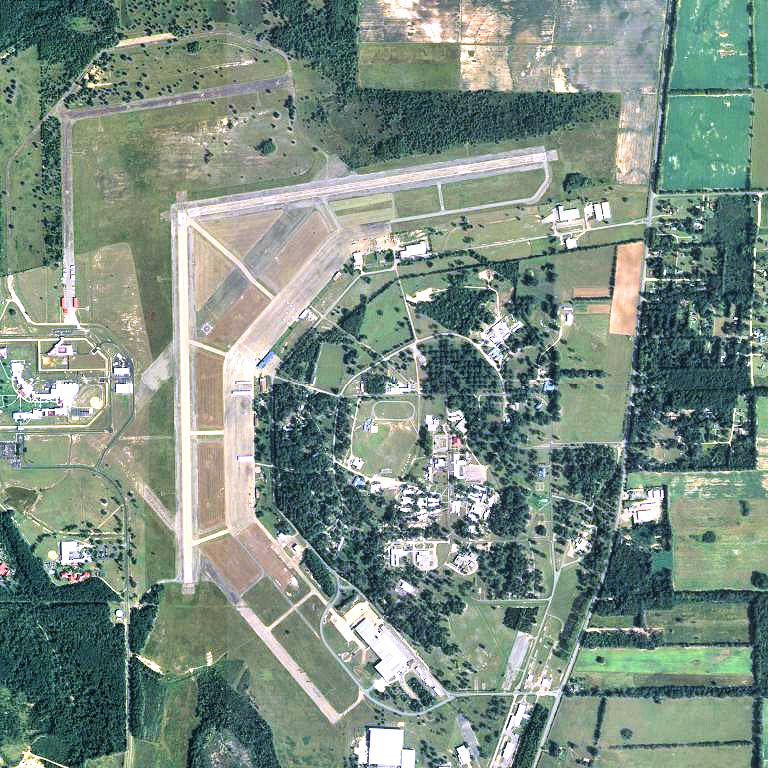
- 2006 USGS photo

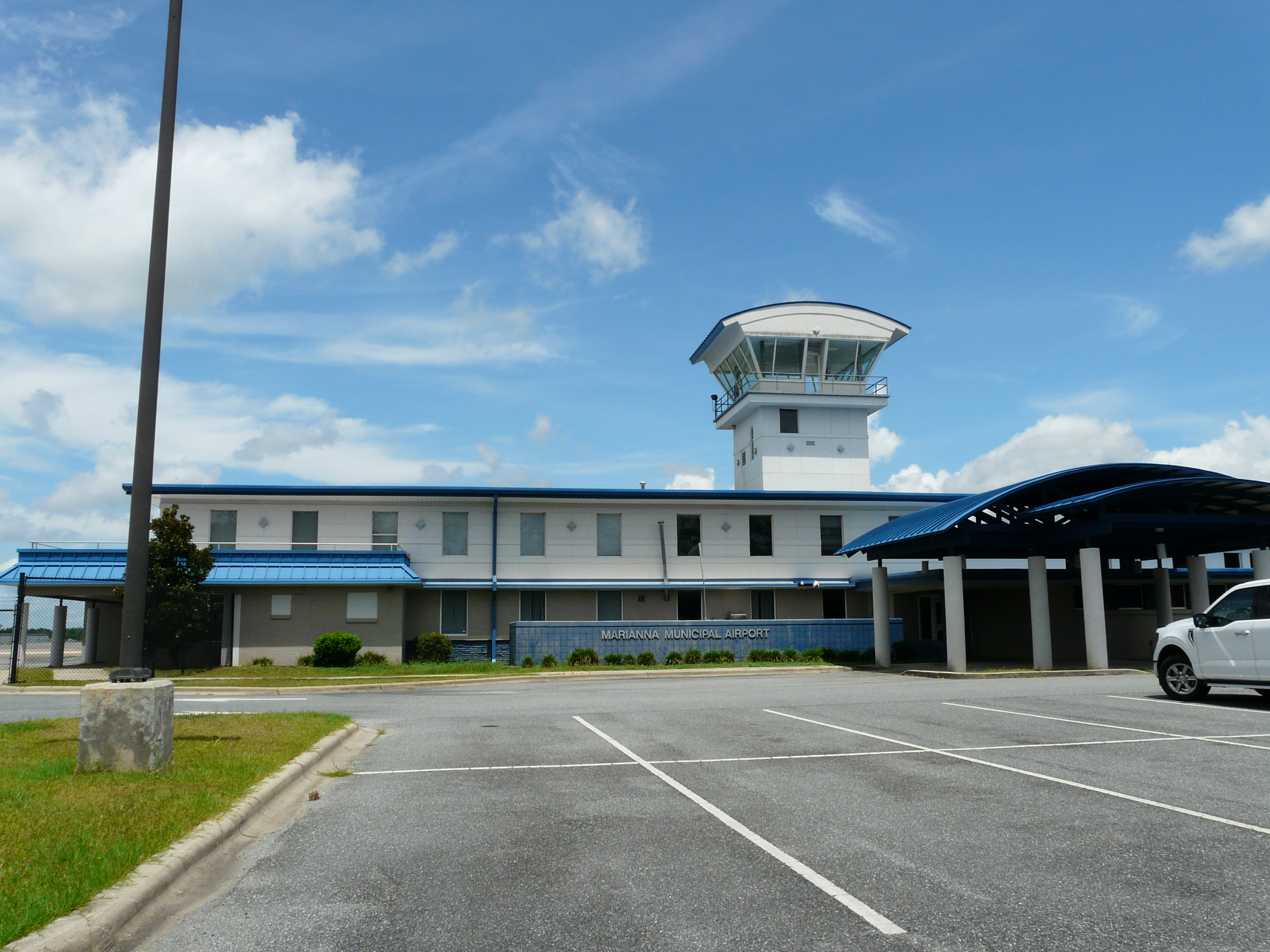
- Terminal
- IATA: none; ICAO: KMAI; FAA LID: MAI; WMO: 74776

Summary
- Airport type: Public
- Owner: Marianna Municipal Airport Authority
- Serves: Marianna, Florida
- Elevation AMSL: 110 ft (34 m)
- Coordinates: 30°50′16″N 085°10′55″W
- Website: cityofmarianna.com/...

Map
- Location of airport in Florida MAI (the United States)

Runways
Direction	Length		Surface
Direction	ft	m	Surface
8/26	4,895	1,492	Asphalt
18/36	4,896	1,492	Asphalt

Statistics (2009)
- Aircraft operations: 28,016
- Based aircraft: 30
- Source: Federal Aviation Administration

Marianna Municipal Airport (ICAO: KMAI, FAA LID: MAI) is an airport in Marianna, Jackson County, Florida, 5 miles (8.0 km) northeast of Downtown Marianna. The Federal Aviation Administration (FAA)'s National Plan of Integrated Airport Systems for 2009–2013 categorized it as a general aviation airport. It was formerly Graham Air Base.

Many U.S. airports use the same three-letter location identifier for the FAA and IATA, but this airport is MAI to the FAA and has no IATA code. (IATA assigned MAI to Mangochi, Malawi).

== History ==
=== Civil use ===
Starting in 1946 National Airlines (NA) Lockheed Lodestars and Convair 340s landed at Marianna. National pulled out in 1961 and the airport has had few or no airline flights since.

The airport has two 4,900-foot (1,500 m) by 100-foot (30 m) intersecting hard surface runways with a pavement strength of 56,500 pounds single wheel load. Runway 18/36 is the primary runway. The USAF control tower and base operations building remain on the flight line, but the airport has been an uncontrolled field for its entire time as a civil airport.

The airport continues to see military aircraft, with a third of the airport's operations normally being transient military training flights, mostly Army helicopters from Fort Novosel and Navy helicopters from Naval Air Station Whiting Field.

== Facilities ==
The airport covers 1,031 acres (417 ha) at an elevation of 110 feet (34 m). It has two operational asphalt runways: Rwy 8/26 is 4,895 by 100 feet (1,492 x 30 m) and Rwy 18/36 is 4,896 by 100 feet (1,492 x 30 m).

In the year ending March 9, 2009, the airport had 28,016 aircraft operations, average 76 per day: 67% general aviation and 33% military. 30 aircraft were then based at the airport: 66.7% single-engine, 20% multi-engine, 6.7% helicopter and 6.7% glider.

== See also ==
- List of airports in Florida
