= Arthur L. Andrews =

Chief Master Sergeant of the United States Air Force

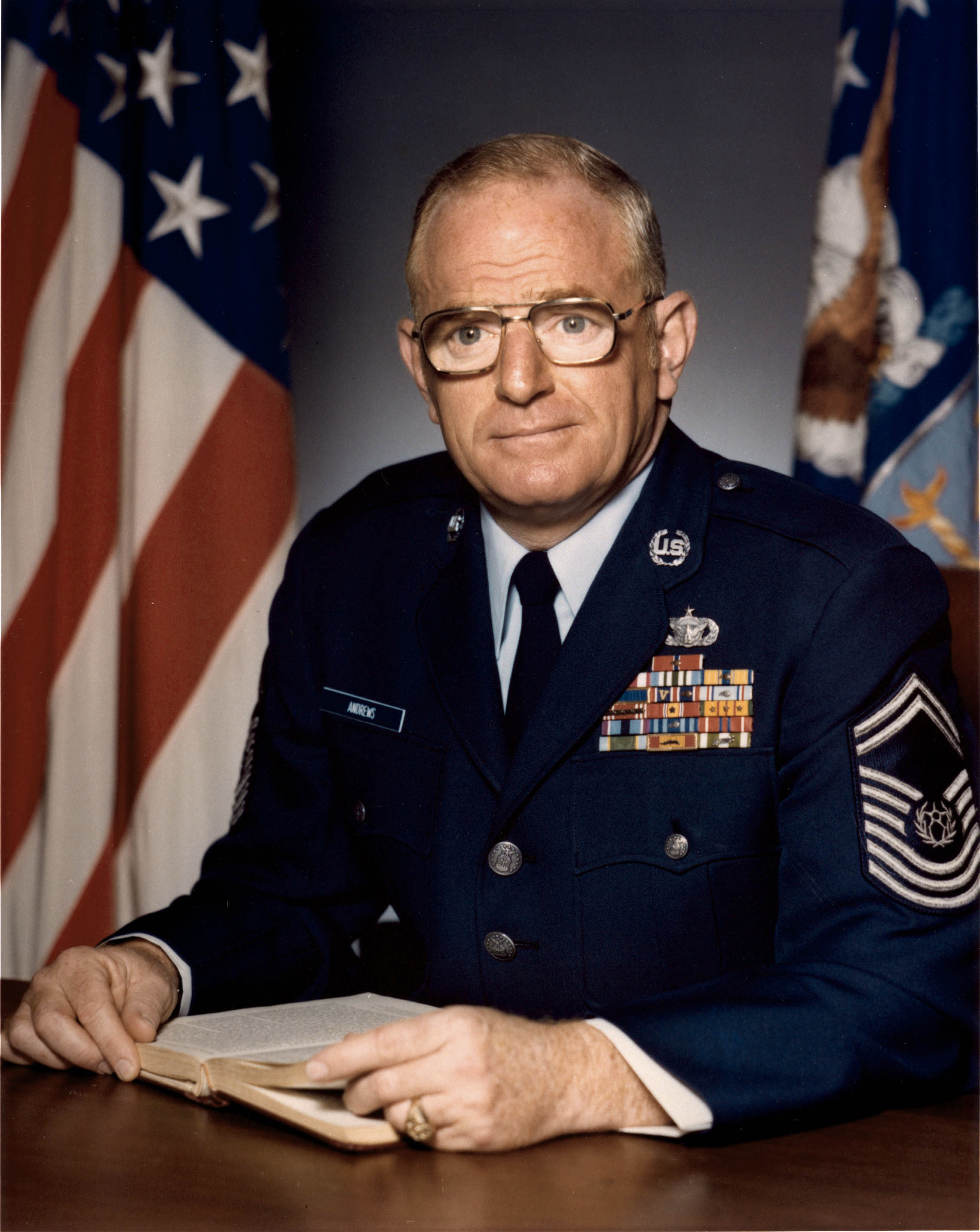
- Andrews c. 1981
- Born: March 9, 1934; Boston, Massachusetts, US
- Died: October 26, 1996 (aged 62)
- Military career
- Branch: United States Air Force
- Service years: 1953–1957; 1958–1983
- Rank: Chief Master Sergeant of the Air Force
- Nickname: Bud
- Unit: 497th Tactical Fighter Squadron
- Conflicts: Vietnam War
- Awards: Legion of Merit; Bronze Star Medal (2); Meritorious Service Medal (2); Joint Service Commendation Medal; Air Force Commendation Medal (3)

Arthur L. "Bud" Andrews (March 9, 1934 – October 26, 1996) was a Chief Master Sergeant in the United States Air Force who served as the 7th Chief Master Sergeant of the Air Force from 1981 to 1983.

== Early life ==
Andrews was born in Boston, Massachusetts, where he attended Cathedral of Holy Cross, Bancroft and Rice Public Schools, and the English High School.

== Military career ==
Andrews enlisted in the United States Air Force in January 1953 and completed basic training at Sampson Air Force Base, New York. His first assignment was to Keesler Air Force Base, Mississippi, in April 1953, where he began 12 years as an air policeman, including eight years as an investigator. After a short tour at Keesler, he was sent to Sheppard Air Force Base, Texas, and then to French Morocco, North Africa. Returning to the United States 12 months later, he was assigned to Travis Air Force Base, California, until January 1957, when he was honorably discharged.

In April 1958, Andrews re-enlisted and was sent to Homestead Air Force Base, Florida, for three months. Andrews was then assigned to Naha Air Base, Okinawa, Japan. He returned to the United States, and was assigned to Shaw Air Force Base, South Carolina, as an air police investigator. He then returned to Kadena Air Base in April 1965 as noncommissioned officer in charge (NCOIC) of the law enforcement administration section, and later NCOIC of protocol. Andrews was then selected to cross-train as a First sergeant.

Andrews' first assignment as a First Sergeant began with the 4576th Transportation Squadron at Tyndall Air Force Base, Florida. Six months later he was assigned to the 497th Tactical Fighter Squadron at Ubon Royal Thai Air Force Base, Thailand. Following his return from Southeast Asia, he was assigned to the Defense Language Institute West Coast in Monterey, California. Two years later he received his second assignment to Southeast Asia at Cam Ranh Bay Air Base, South Vietnam, as First Sergeant for the 483rd Organizational Maintenance Squadron.

In December 1971, Andrews returned to Keesler and served initially with the 3385th Student Squadron and then with the 3392nd Student Squadron. While there he attended Class 73C of the Senior Noncommissioned Officer Academy at Gunter Air Force Station, Alabama. Upon graduation he transferred to the 6594th Test Group at Hickam Air Force Base, Hawaii. He was assigned to Headquarters Squadron Section at Hanscom Air Force Base, as the first sergeant from January 1976 to June 1977. Andrews was then selected as senior enlisted adviser to the commander, electronic systems division at Hanscom. He became senior enlisted adviser to the commander, Air Force Systems Command, Andrews Air Force Base, Maryland, in May 1978.

In 1981, Andrews was appointed the 7th Chief Master Sergeant of the Air Force. In this role he was senior enlisted advisor to the Chief of Staff of the Air Force General Charles A. Gabriel and the United States Secretary of the Air Force Verne Orr on matters concerning the enlisted force's welfare, effective utilization of manpower, and progress of the enlisted members of the Air Force.

== Awards and decorations ==
Personal decorations
Width-44 crimson ribbon with a pair of width-2 white stripes on the edges	Legion of Merit
Width-44 scarlet ribbon with width-4 ultramarine blue stripe at center, surrounded by width-1 white stripes. Width-1 white stripes are at the edges.	Bronze Star Medal with bronze oak leaf cluster
Width-44 crimson ribbon with two width-8 white stripes at distance 4 from the edges.	Meritorious Service Medal with bronze oak leaf cluster
	Joint Service Commendation Medal
	Air Force Commendation Medal with two bronze oak leaf clusters
Unit awards
	Presidential Unit Citation
	Air Force Outstanding Unit Award with Valor device and bronze oak leaf cluster
Service awards
	Air Force Good Conduct Medal with silver oak leaf cluster and three bronze oak leaf clusters
	Army Good Conduct Medal
Campaign and service medals
Width=44 scarlet ribbon with a central width-4 golden yellow stripe, flanked by pairs of width-1 scarlet, white, Old Glory blue, and white stripes	National Defense Service Medal with bronze service star
	Vietnam Service Medal with three bronze service stars
	Humanitarian Service Medal
Service, training, and marksmanship awards
	Air Force Overseas Short Tour Service Ribbon
	Air Force Overseas Long Tour Service Ribbon
	Air Force Longevity Service Award with silver oak leaf cluster
	NCO Professional Military Education Graduate Ribbon
	Small Arms Expert Marksmanship Ribbon with bronze service star
	Air Force Training Ribbon
Foreign awards
	Vietnam Gallantry Cross Unit Award
	Vietnam Campaign Medal

USAF Badges
Senior Security Police Qualification Badge
Air Force Security Forces Badge

Military offices
Preceded by James M. McCoy	Chief Master Sergeant of the Air Force; 1981–1983	Succeeded by Sam E. Parish
