= Merrell C. Clark =

American politician

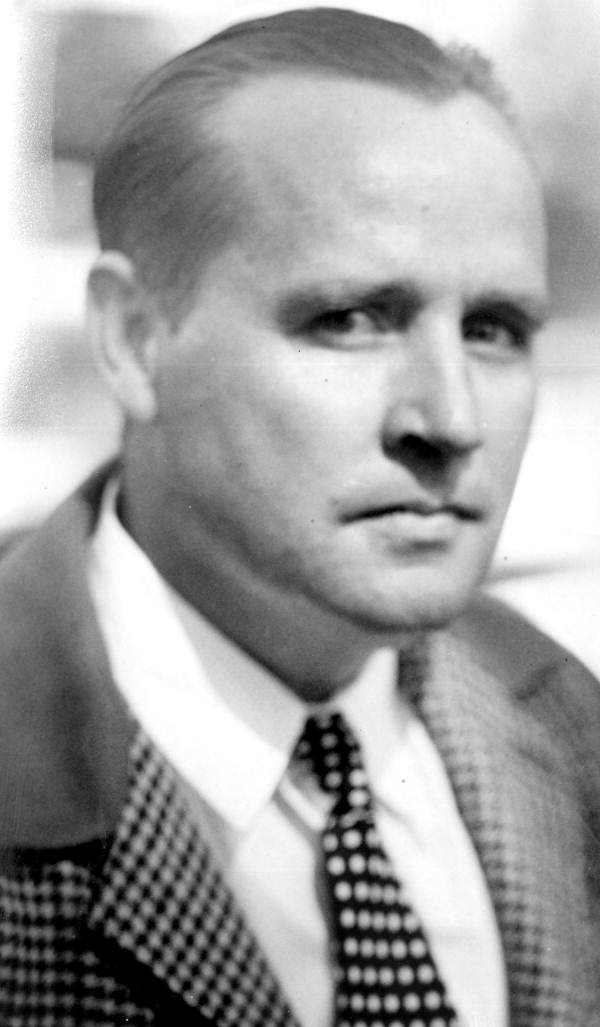
- Clark in 1947

Member of the Florida House of Representatives from Jackson County
- In office 1946–1947

Personal details
- Born: January 13, 1911 Jackson County, Florida, U.S.
- Died: October 16, 1998 (aged 87)
- Party: Democratic

Merrell C. Clark (January 13, 1911 – October 16, 1998) was an American politician. He served as a Democratic member of the Florida House of Representatives.

Clark was born in Jackson County, Florida. He served in the Florida House of Representatives from 1946 to 1947.

He died in October 1998, at the age of 87.
