= Danny Lipford =

American broadcaster (born 1957)

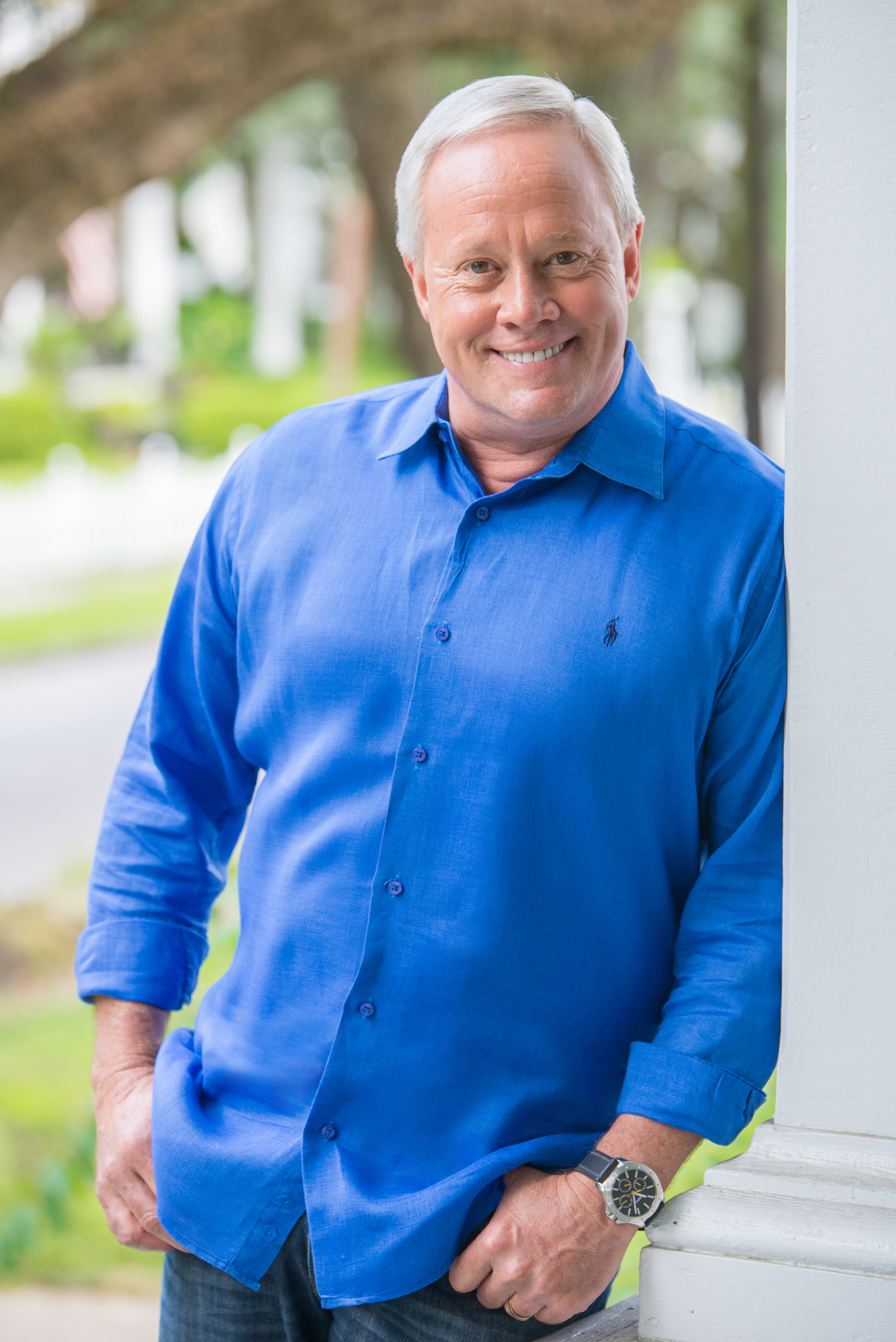
- Danny Lipford
- Born: Daniel Lipford; May 27, 1957 (age 68); Marianna, Florida, USA
- Occupation: Home Improvement Personality
- Years active: 1978–present

Danny Lipford (born May 29, 1957) is an American contractor and television personality known to audiences as Host and Executive Producer of the nationally syndicated home improvement television and radio shows, Today's Homeowner with Danny Lipford, and for his appearances on The Weather Channel, and CBS's The Early Show.

== Construction career ==
Lipford was born in Marianna, Florida. At the age of 9, Danny got the home improvement bug and bought his first tool, a jigsaw from a mail order catalogue. He moved to Mobile, Alabama in 1975 to attend the University of South Alabama but his side job as a handyman turned into a full-time passion. In 1978, he started his remodeling business, Lipford Construction, which celebrated its 40th anniversary in 2018.

After 46 years running a small business, Danny and his team decided to hang up their hats and closed the doors to Lipford Construction in June 2025.

== The Weather Channel ==
In 2000, Lipford joined The Weather Channel as their home improvement expert. In daily short segments broadcast throughout the week, he offered advice and guidance on a variety of home topics.

Lipford also covered weather-related home topics for the Weather Channel including hurricane preparation tips, and recovering from a tornado. He has also appeared live from across the country for special first day of the season broadcasts from Traverse City, Michigan, Fish Creek, Wisconsin, and other locations.

== CBS This Morning ==
Lipford was the home improvement contributor to CBS This Morning, and its predecessor, The Early Show, for over a decade. In short segments, he demonstrated a variety of how-to projects in the studio and on location and has appeared live from the floor of industry trade shows including the International Builders' Show, the Kitchen and Bath Show, and the National Hardware Show.

== Better Homes and Gardens and Other Appearances ==
Lipford was a contributing editor to Better Homes and Gardens magazine and bhg.com starting in 2009, providing articles, columns and videos

Lipford also demonstrated spring cleaning tips on LIVE with Regis & Kelly, moderated "Thermostat Wars" on The Rachael Ray Show and shown how to hang Christmas lights safely on Inside Edition. He has been a resource for magazines and newspapers ranging from Parade magazine to the Chicago Tribune.
