= Jackson County School Board =

School district in Florida, United States

Coordinates: 30.7762°N 85.2267°W

Address
- 2903 Jefferson Street Marianna, Florida, 32446; United States

District information
- Type: Public
- Motto: Educating the future...today.
- Grades: K–12
- Superintendent: Steve Benton
- Enrollment: 6,400 (2018)

Other information
- Website: jcsb.org

The Jackson County School Board is the school district of Jackson County, Florida. Its headquarters are in Marianna.

== Board members ==
- Superintendent: Steve Benton
- District 1: Diane Long
- District 2: Tony Pumphrey
- District 3: Stacey Goodson
- District 4: Chris Johnson
- District 5: Charlotte Gardner
- Board Attorney: Matt Fuqua

== Schools ==
=== Secondary ===
- Marianna High School (Bulldog) (9–12)
- Graceville High School (Tiger) (6–12)
- Sneads High School (Pirate) (9–12)
- Cottondale High School (Hornet)

=== Elementary ===
- Cottondale Elementary School
- Graceville Elementary School

=== Combined ===
- Hope School (K-12)
- Jackson Alternative School (K-12)
- Malone School (K–12)
- Marianna K-8

=== Early Childhood ===
- Jackson County Early Childhood Center

=== Closed schools ===
In August 2020, three Marianna schools were closed and combined to create the Marianna K-8 School.

- Golson Elementary, Grades K-2
- Riverside Elementary, Grades 3-5
- Sneads Elementary
- Grand Ridge School, Grades 5-8
- Marianna Middle School, Grades 6-8

Other closed schools

- Jackson Academy of Applied Technology
- Jackson County Training School (school for black students during segregation)

== See also ==
- Cottonwood High School official website
