= Marianna, Florida =

- City
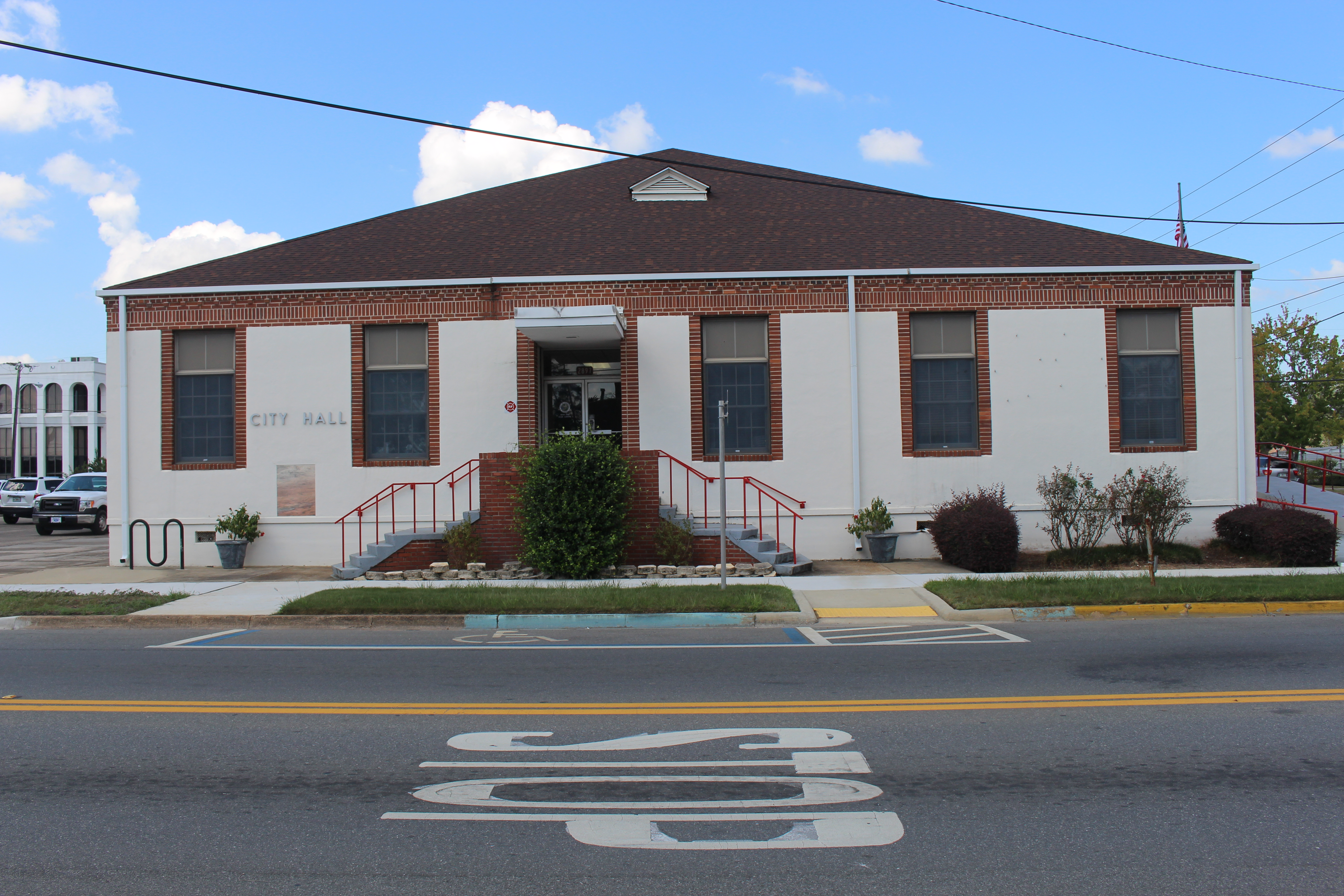
- Marianna City Hall
- Nickname: The City of Southern Charm
- Location in Jackson County and the state of Florida
- Coordinates: 30°46′26″N 85°15′17″W
- Country: United States
- State: Florida
- County: Jackson
- Incorporated: 1825

Government
  - Type: Commission–Manager

Area
  - Total: 18.64 sq mi (48.29 km^{2})
  - Land: 18.60 sq mi (48.17 km^{2})
  - Water: 0.046 sq mi (0.12 km^{2})
- Elevation: 125 ft (38 m)

Population (2020)
  - Total: 6,245
  - Density: 335.7/sq mi (129.63/km^{2})
- Time zone: UTC-6 (Central (CST))
  - Summer (DST): UTC-5 (CDT)
- ZIP codes: 32446-32448
- Area code: 850
- FIPS code: 12-43175
- GNIS feature ID: 2405018
- Website: www.cityofmarianna.com

Marianna is a city in and the county seat of Jackson County, Florida, United States, and it is home to Chipola College, part of the state's public system. The official nickname of Marianna is "The City of Southern Charm". The population was 6,245 at the 2020 census.

== Early history ==
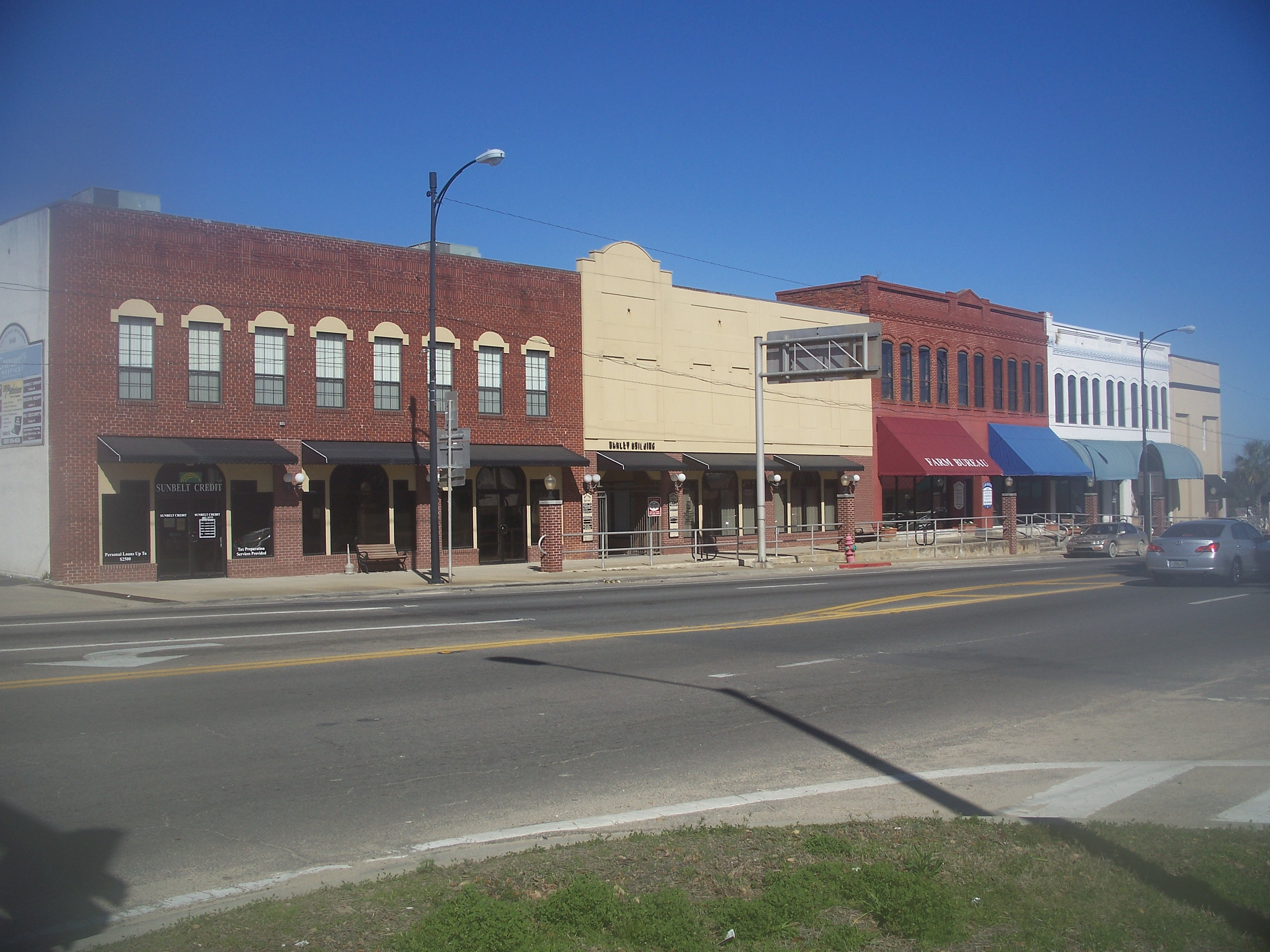
Part of the historic downtown area

Marianna was founded in 1828 by Scottish entrepreneur Scott Beveridge (2010 source) aka Beverege, who named the town after his daughters Mary and Anna. The following year, it was designated as the county seat. It attracted businesses from the former seat, Webbville, which became defunct. Marianna was platted along the Chipola River.

Many planters from North Carolina relocated to Jackson County to develop new plantations to take advantage of the fertile soil. They relied on the labor of enslaved African Americans brought from the Upper South in the domestic slave trade.

== Civil War era ==
Governor John Milton, a major planter who owned the Sylvania Plantation and hundreds of slaves, was a grandson of Revolutionary War hero John Millton, and a descendant of Sir Christopher Milton, the brother of the famous English poet, John Milton. A Marianna resident, he was elected as governor of Florida, serving during the Civil War years. Governor Milton opposed the Confederate States of America rejoining the United States.

As federal troops were preparing to take control of Tallahassee, Governor Milton received word that the Civil War had ended and that Florida would again be part of the United States. On April 1, 1865, as the Southern cause was collapsing, Milton was found dead of a gunshot wound at Sylvania. The New York Times reported that Governor Milton had committed suicide, noting that he had said he "would rather die" than suffer Federal invasion. The West Florida News, by contrast, reported the sudden death of Florida's fifth Governor as a hunting accident. Governor Milton was buried in the St. Luke's Episcopal churchyard at Marianna. During Reconstruction, the Times account dominated.

Marianna was the site of a Civil War battle in 1864 between a small home guard of about 150 boys, older men, and wounded soldiers, and a contingent of approximately 700 Federal troops.

== Reconstruction period ==
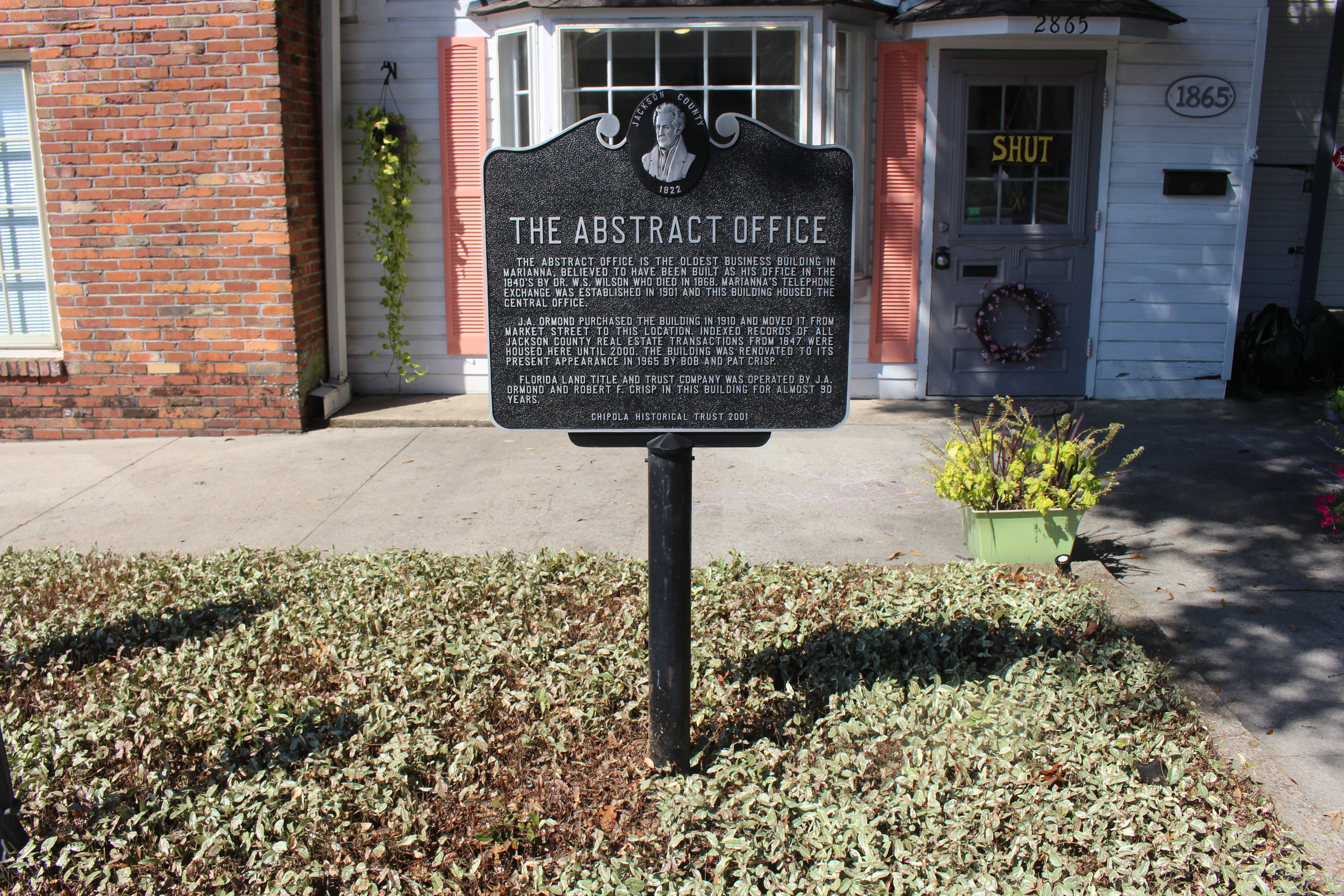
Historic Abstract Office, Downtown Marianna

During the early years after the Civil War, Ku Klux Klan terrorism and violence flared in Marianna, Florida, and surrounding Jackson County. Disputes over farm land prompted much of the Klan activity, as white supremacists violently reacted against black freedmen gaining ownership of tax-forfeited farms, which was new federal law of the Reconstruction era. Local leaders of the Klan committed to restoring white supremacy throughout Jackson County; they enforced their mandate by perpetrating terror and intimidation against local blacks and their white sympathizers/agents. In a sustained campaign of terrorism known as the Jackson County War an estimated 150 to 200 Republicans, many black, were murdered or maimed in violent beatings by nightriding mobs of Klansmen. Local white officials typically claimed—without offering evidence—that the violence was the work of carpetbaggers and "ruffians" from the border states. Bishop Charles H. Pearce of Massachusetts, an AME minister who became a state senator in Florida, had first-hand knowledge of the situation. He blamed the planters of Jackson County, who publicly advocated for deadly violence against black Republicans.

== Post-Reconstruction to mid-20th century ==
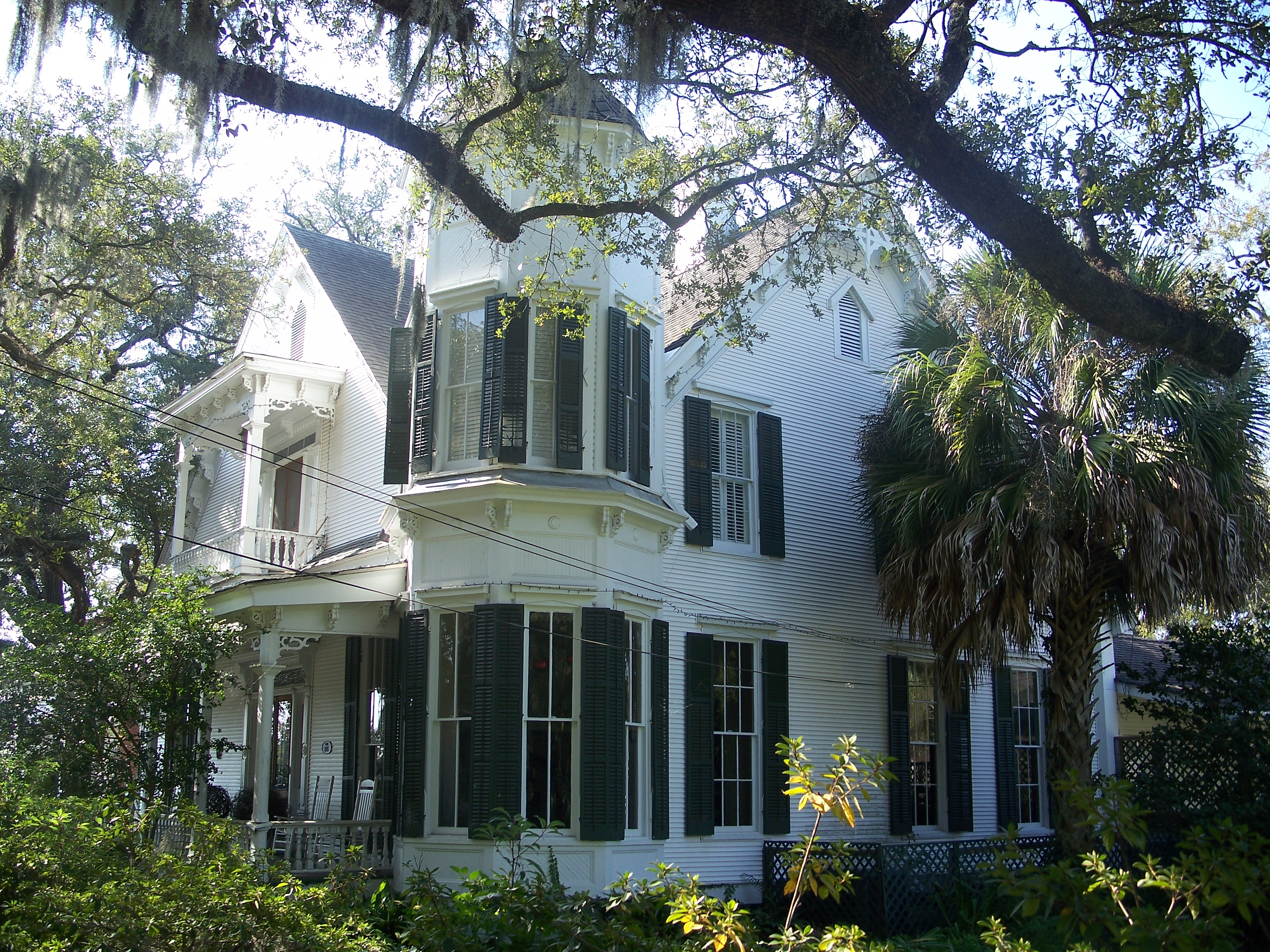
Dekle-Brunner House, Marianna Historic District

Violence continued in the state after Reconstruction, reaching a peak in most areas at the turn of the 20th century. This was the period in which southern states also disenfranchised most blacks and thousands of poor whites by raising barriers to voter registration. From 1900 to 1930, Florida had the highest rate of lynchings per capita in the South and the nation. Refusing to accept the violence, thousands of African Americans left the state during the Great Migration of the early 20th century, going to northern and midwestern industrial cities for work and other opportunities.

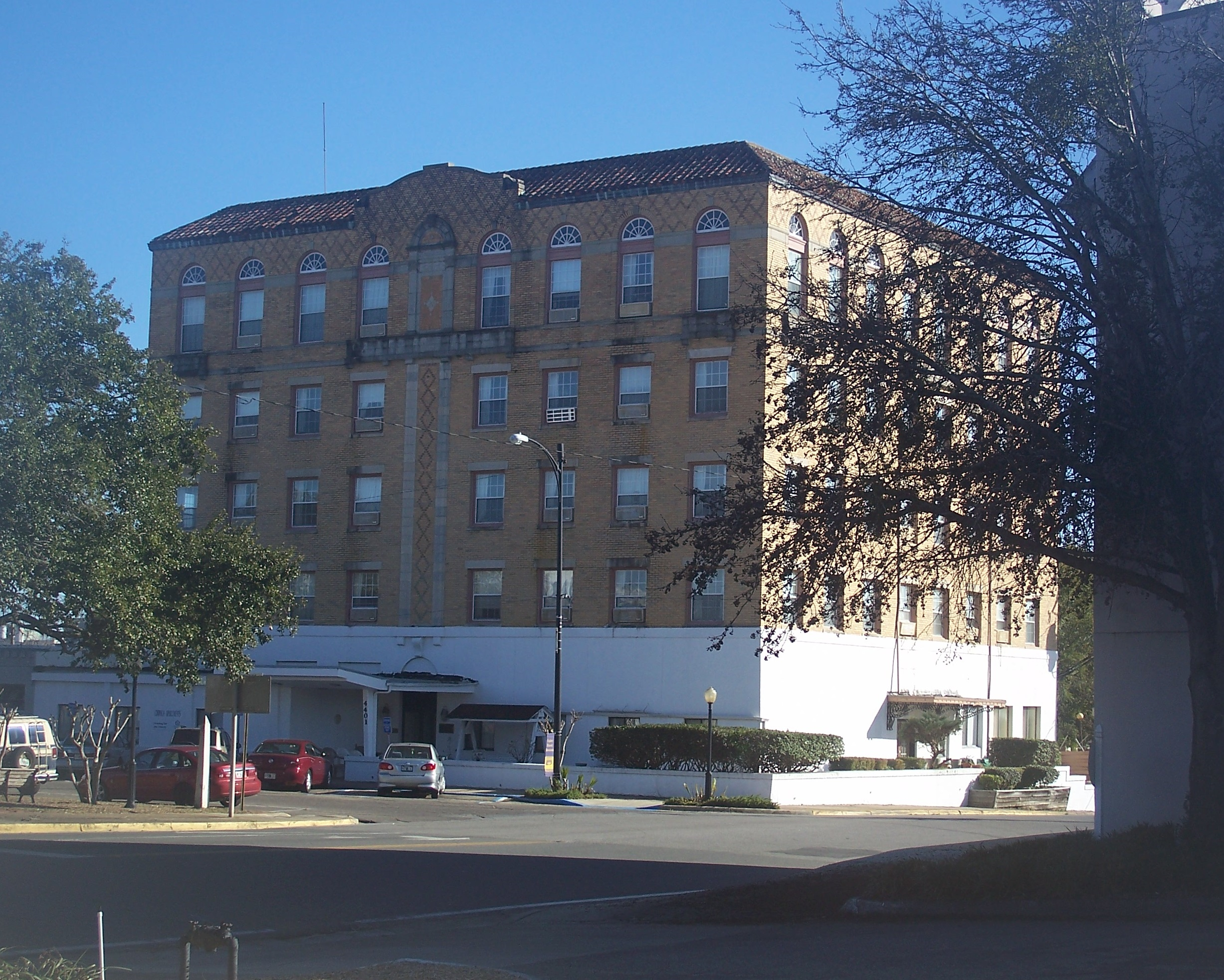
Historic Chipola Hotel, Downtown Marianna

=== Lynchings associated with Marianna ===
After the lynching of Claude Neal near Greenwood on October 26, 1934, Neal's body was hanged from a tree in the courthouse square in Marianna. When the sheriff discovered it in the morning, he cut it down. In the next few days, white people in Marianna rioted in an attempt to drive black people from the county, injuring an estimated 200 persons, including two police, and destroying black-owned property. Eventually, Governor David Sholtz called in more than 100 troops of the National Guard to suppress the white rioting.

In 1943 Cellos Harrison was taken from the county jail at Marianna by a white mob and hanged (lynched) near Greenwood. His case had been in the courts for two years in appeals after the African-American man was arrested and twice convicted by all-white juries and sentenced to death for the 1940 murder of a white man. He had confessed without benefit of counsel, and his convictions were overturned by the Florida Supreme Court as a result. But whites were tired of waiting for the case to be resolved, and lynched him.

President Franklin D. Roosevelt directed the Department of Justice to investigate Harrison's lynching; he felt it was unjust that blacks were getting lynched at home while the U.S. was ostensibly fighting for freedom in Europe. No one was ever prosecuted for Harrison's death.

== Florida School for Boys ==
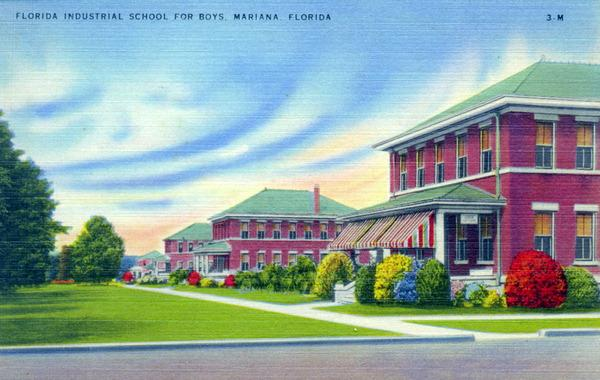
Florida Industrial School for Boys

The Florida School for Boys, a large state reform school, operated in Marianna from January 1, 1900, to June 30, 2011. For a time, it was the largest juvenile reform institution in the United States. Throughout its 111-year history, the school gained a reputation for abuse, beatings, rapes, and torture of students by staff. It was rumored that students had died there as a result of injuries. Despite periodic investigations, changes of leadership, and promises by the state to improve conditions, the allegations of cruelty and abuse continued.

Many of the allegations were confirmed by separate investigations by the Florida Department of Law Enforcement in 2010 and the Civil Rights Division of the United States Department of Justice in 2011. State authorities closed the school permanently in June 2011.

In 2015, a multi-year investigation of the cemetery and grounds by the University of South Florida (USF), which was attempting to find undocumented burials on the grounds, revealed details of a secret "rape dungeon", where boys younger than 12 were sexually abused. It positively identified five bodies from remains recovered on the grounds. By January 2016, the end of the USF's studies of the grounds and exhumation of remains, it had identified 55 previously unknown burials, made a match for seven bodies through DNA, and presumptively identified another 14 sets of remains of 51 found. Twenty-seven more graves were discovered in 2019. The team created a website containing documentation of their investigation and will continue to work with state agencies and families of former students to identify more remains.

== Hurricane Michael ==
The city was one of several Florida Panhandle communities devastated by Category 5 Hurricane Michael on October 10, 2018. The downtown area was strongly hit: several historic buildings collapsed and blocked Lafayette Street, which is the main road.

The city was without power for three weeks, which caused extensive school cancellations. More than 80% of homes and businesses in Marianna were heavily damaged or destroyed due to Michael's extreme winds. Millions of dollars in insurance claims were filed, and the area suffered millions of dollars in economic losses. This hurricane is the worst natural disaster to ever strike Marianna, surpassing the damages caused by a F-3 tornado spawned by Hurricane Ivan in September 2004.

== Geography ==
Marianna is located in central Jackson County. U.S. Route 90 passes through the center of town as Lafayette Street, leading east 14 miles (23 km) to Grand Ridge and west 9 miles (14 km) to Cottondale. Interstate 10 passes through the southern end of the city, leading east 65 miles (105 km) to Tallahassee, the state capital, and west 130 miles (210 km) to Pensacola. Access to Marianna is at Exit 136, Florida State Road 276. It is close to the time zone border

According to the United States Census Bureau, the city has a total area of 16.8 square miles (43.6 km^{2}), of which 0.04 square miles (0.1 km^{2}), or 0.29%, are water. The Chipola River, which forms the eastern border of the city, is part of the Apalachicola River watershed.

=== Climate ===
Climate data for Marianna, Florida (Marianna Municipal Airport), 1991–2020 normals, extremes 1950–present
Month	Jan	Feb	Mar	Apr	May	Jun	Jul	Aug	Sep	Oct	Nov	Dec	Year
Record high °F (°C)	84 (29)	87 (31)	89 (32)	94 (34)	101 (38)	105 (41)	105 (41)	104 (40)	103 (39)	99 (37)	89 (32)	85 (29)	105 (41)
Mean maximum °F (°C)	78.3 (25.7)	80.3 (26.8)	85.5 (29.7)	89.3 (31.8)	95.6 (35.3)	97.8 (36.6)	98.3 (36.8)	97.7 (36.5)	95.8 (35.4)	91.0 (32.8)	84.0 (28.9)	79.6 (26.4)	99.7 (37.6)
Mean daily maximum °F (°C)	62.9 (17.2)	67.1 (19.5)	73.7 (23.2)	80.1 (26.7)	87.5 (30.8)	91.2 (32.9)	92.4 (33.6)	91.4 (33.0)	88.7 (31.5)	81.1 (27.3)	71.7 (22.1)	64.7 (18.2)	79.4 (26.3)
Daily mean °F (°C)	51.8 (11.0)	55.4 (13.0)	61.5 (16.4)	67.6 (19.8)	75.9 (24.4)	81.1 (27.3)	82.7 (28.2)	82.1 (27.8)	78.7 (25.9)	69.5 (20.8)	59.6 (15.3)	53.9 (12.2)	68.3 (20.2)
Mean daily minimum °F (°C)	40.7 (4.8)	43.8 (6.6)	49.2 (9.6)	55.1 (12.8)	64.2 (17.9)	71.1 (21.7)	73.0 (22.8)	72.8 (22.7)	68.6 (20.3)	58.0 (14.4)	47.4 (8.6)	43.0 (6.1)	57.2 (14.0)
Mean minimum °F (°C)	23.1 (−4.9)	28.0 (−2.2)	32.0 (0.0)	40.4 (4.7)	50.7 (10.4)	63.8 (17.7)	68.6 (20.3)	66.9 (19.4)	56.8 (13.8)	42.0 (5.6)	30.5 (−0.8)	27.2 (−2.7)	22.0 (−5.6)
Record low °F (°C)	15 (−9)	16 (−9)	23 (−5)	33 (1)	45 (7)	55 (13)	62 (17)	61 (16)	46 (8)	28 (−2)	20 (−7)	17 (−8)	15 (−9)
Average precipitation inches (mm)	4.04 (103)	4.49 (114)	5.01 (127)	3.72 (94)	3.15 (80)	5.07 (129)	5.10 (130)	4.93 (125)	4.06 (103)	3.06 (78)	3.67 (93)	4.81 (122)	51.11 (1,298)
Average precipitation days (≥ 0.01 in)	10.0	9.4	9.0	7.4	6.4	12.4	13.9	13.6	9.4	8.1	8.9	10.7	119.2
Source: XMACIS2

== Demographics ==
Historical population
Census	Pop.	Note	%±
1850	377		—
1860	440		16.7%
1870	663		50.7%
1880	586		−11.6%
1890	926		58.0%
1900	900		−2.8%
1910	1,915		112.8%
1920	2,499		30.5%
1930	3,372		34.9%
1940	5,079		50.6%
1950	5,845		15.1%
1960	7,152		22.4%
1970	7,282		1.8%
1980	7,006		−3.8%
1990	6,292		−10.2%
2000	6,230		−1.0%
2010	6,102		−2.1%
2020	6,245		2.3%
U.S. Decennial Census

Marianna first appeared in the 1850 U.S. Census with a recorded population of 377.

=== Racial and ethnic composition ===
Marianna racial composition (Hispanics excluded from racial categories) (NH = Non-Hispanic)
Race	Pop 2010	Pop 2020	% 2010	% 2020
White (NH)	3,173	3,026	52.00%	48.45%
Black or African American (NH)	2,540	2,500	41.63%	40.03%
Native American or Alaska Native (NH)	23	18	0.38%	0.29%
Asian (NH)	56	115	0.92%	1.84%
Pacific Islander or Native Hawaiian (NH)	4	6	0.07%	0.10%
Some other race (NH)	5	23	0.08%	0.37%
Two or more races/Multiracial (NH)	136	262	2.23%	4.20%
Hispanic or Latino (any race)	165	295	2.70%	4.72%
Total	6,102	6,245		

=== 2020 census ===
As of the 2020 census, Marianna had a population of 6,245. The median age was 36.9 years. 22.5% of residents were under the age of 18 and 19.1% of residents were 65 years of age or older. For every 100 females there were 93.3 males, and for every 100 females age 18 and over there were 91.5 males age 18 and over.

81.9% of residents lived in urban areas, while 18.1% lived in rural areas.

There were 2,290 households in Marianna, of which 32.6% had children under the age of 18 living in them. Of all households, 28.6% were married-couple households, 20.3% were households with a male householder and no spouse or partner present, and 44.9% were households with a female householder and no spouse or partner present. About 34.9% of all households were made up of individuals and 17.2% had someone living alone who was 65 years of age or older.

There were 2,808 housing units, of which 18.4% were vacant. The homeowner vacancy rate was 3.8% and the rental vacancy rate was 12.8%.

The U.S. Census Bureau's 2020 ACS 5-year estimates reported 1,662 families residing in the city.

=== 2010 census ===
As of the 2010 United States census, there were 6,102 people, 1,924 households, and 1,189 families residing in the city.

=== 2000 census ===
As of the census of 2000, there were 6,230 people, 2,398 households, and 1,395 families residing in the city. The population density was 776.1 inhabitants per square mile (299.7/km^{2}). There were 2,764 housing units at an average density of 344.3 per square mile (132.9/km^{2}). The racial makeup of the city was 56.8% White, 40.2% African American, 0.3% Native American, 0.7% Asian, 0.9% from other races, and 1.1% from two or more races. Hispanic or Latino of any race were 2.6% of the population.

In 2000, there were 2,398 households, out of which 28.8% had children under the age of 18 living with them, 34.3% were married couples living together, 20.7% had a female householder with no husband present, and 41.8% were non-families. 38.0% of all households were made up of individuals, and 19.3% had someone living alone who was 65 years of age or older. The average household size was 2.22 and the average family size was 2.96.

In 2000, in the city, the population was spread out, with 26.7% under the age of 18, 11.8% from 18 to 24, 22.3% from 25 to 44, 18.4% from 45 to 64, and 20.8% who were 65 years of age or older. The median age was 36 years. For every 100 females, there were 88.9 males. For every 100 females age 18 and over, there were 76.7 males.

In 2000, the median income for a household in the city was $23,861, and the median income for a family was $29,590. Males had a median income of $28,500 versus $21,530 for females. The per capita income for the city was $14,021. About 20.9% of families and 28.5% of the population were below the poverty line, including 41.7% of those under age 18 and 34.6% of those age 65 or over.

== Education ==
Jackson County School Board operates public K–12 schools. Marianna has four schools, all of which usually perform in the high C-low B range in the state's FCAT grade scale. Marianna K-8 School for grades Pre-K to 8th grade, and Marianna High School for grades 9–12, Jackson Alternative School for grades 4-12, and Hope School for grades PK-12.

Chipola College, home of the Chipola Indians, is the choice for many residents and offers dual-enrollment classes for high school students. The college is a four-year state institution offering bachelor's degrees in nine programs. Additionally, students can earn masters and doctoral degrees on the Chipola Campus through Troy State University, University of Florida, University of West Florida, and Florida State University.

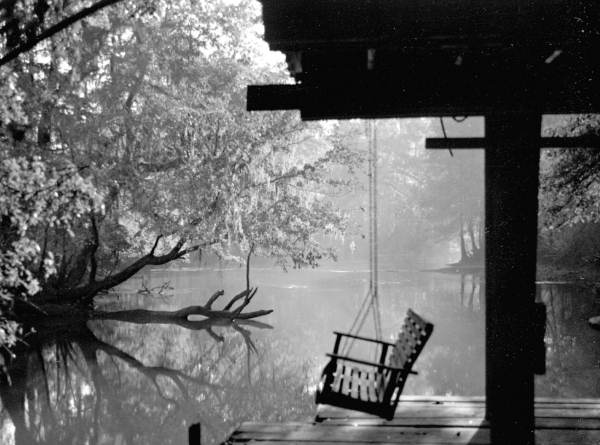
Chipola River

From 1961 to 1966, a junior college, Jackson Junior College, served African-American students. It closed in 1966 after passage of the Civil Rights Act of 1964 and the opening of Chipola Junior College (today Chipola College) to all students.

== Government ==
Marianna had the first Jewish mayor in Florida, Henry Brash. He served three terms before moving to Tampa.

== Transportation ==
=== Highways ===
- Interstate 10
- State Road 71
- State Road 73

=== Railroads ===
Freight service is provided by the Florida Gulf & Atlantic Railroad, which acquired most of the former CSX main line from Pensacola to Jacksonville on June 1, 2019.

=== Airports ===
Marianna Municipal Airport was developed at a former World War II Army Air Corps base that was transferred to the city. It is a public-use airport located 4 miles (6.4 km) northeast of the central business district.

== Attractions ==
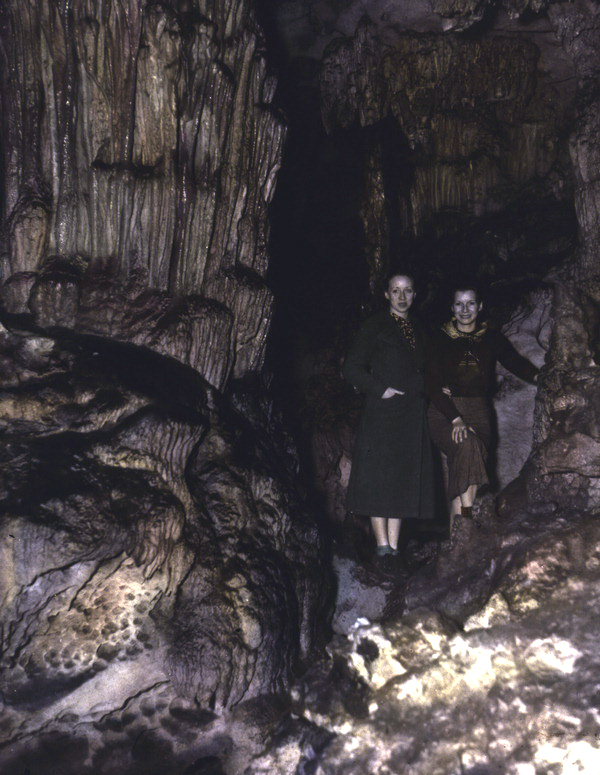
Florida Caverns State Park

Marianna is an official Florida Main Street town. The downtown area has been restored to look as it did many years ago, to encourage heritage tourism and emphasize its unique character and a pedestrian-friendly neighborhood. The downtown area includes the Marianna Historic District, which has a number of antebellum homes.

Florida Caverns State Park is located 2 miles (3 km) north of town. There is also cave diving in underwater Blue Springs. St. Luke's Episcopal Church and cemetery are state landmarks, as they had a principal role in the U.S. Civil War battle of Marianna in 1864.

The Chipola River is a source of recreation during all but the winter months.

== Notable people ==
- Kelly J. Baker, writer and editor
- Tim Davis, former pitcher for the Seattle Mariners
- John Quincy Dickinson, politician and Union army officer
- Cliff Ellis, basketball head coach, Coastal Carolina University, born in Marianna
- Timothy Thomas Fortune, civil rights leader, writer, born in Marianna
- Bobby Goldsboro, pop and country singer-songwriter, born in Marianna
- Alex Hamilton (born 1993), basketball player for Hapoel Eilat
- David Hart, actor, TV series In the Heat of the Night
- George Sydney Hawkins, politician and justice
- Caroline Lee Hentz, novelist and author
- Danny Lipford, home improvement expert
- Moss Mabry, Academy Award-nominated costume designer
- Jeff Mathis, professional baseball player
- John Milton, governor of Florida during the Civil War
- Jeff Milton, Old West lawman, son of the preciding
- William Hall Milton, U.S. senator
- Claude Neal, African-American victim of torture and spectacle lynching in 1934
- Sam E. Parish, 8th Chief Master Sergeant of the Air Force
- Rick Pearson, professional golfer
- Pete Peterson, American politician and diplomat
- Wankard Pooser, politician
- Edd Sorenson, professional cave diver
- Jim Sorey, professional football player
- Ret Turner, Emmy Award-winning costume designer
- Doug Woodlief, professional football player

== Gallery ==
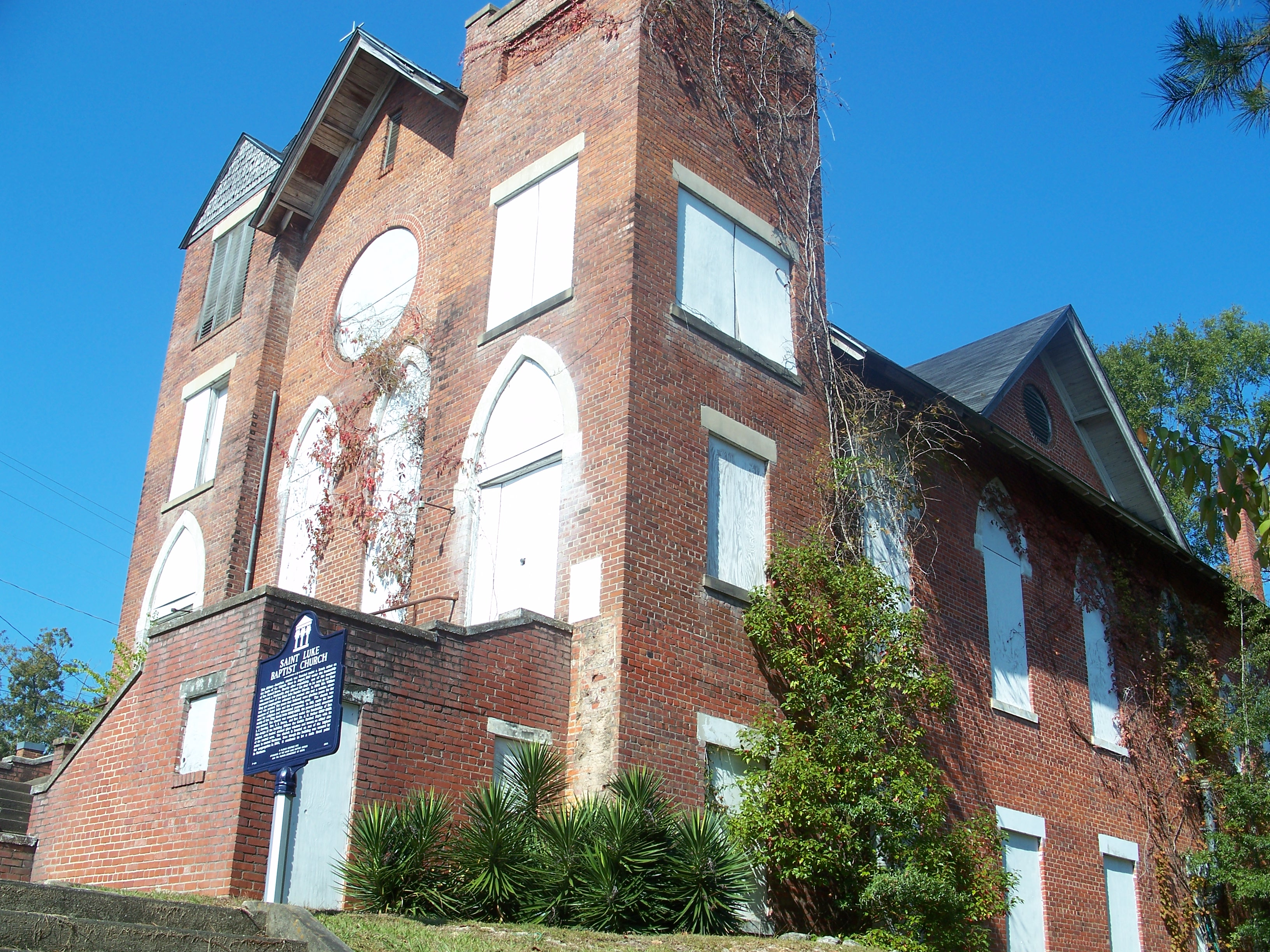
St. Luke Baptist Church

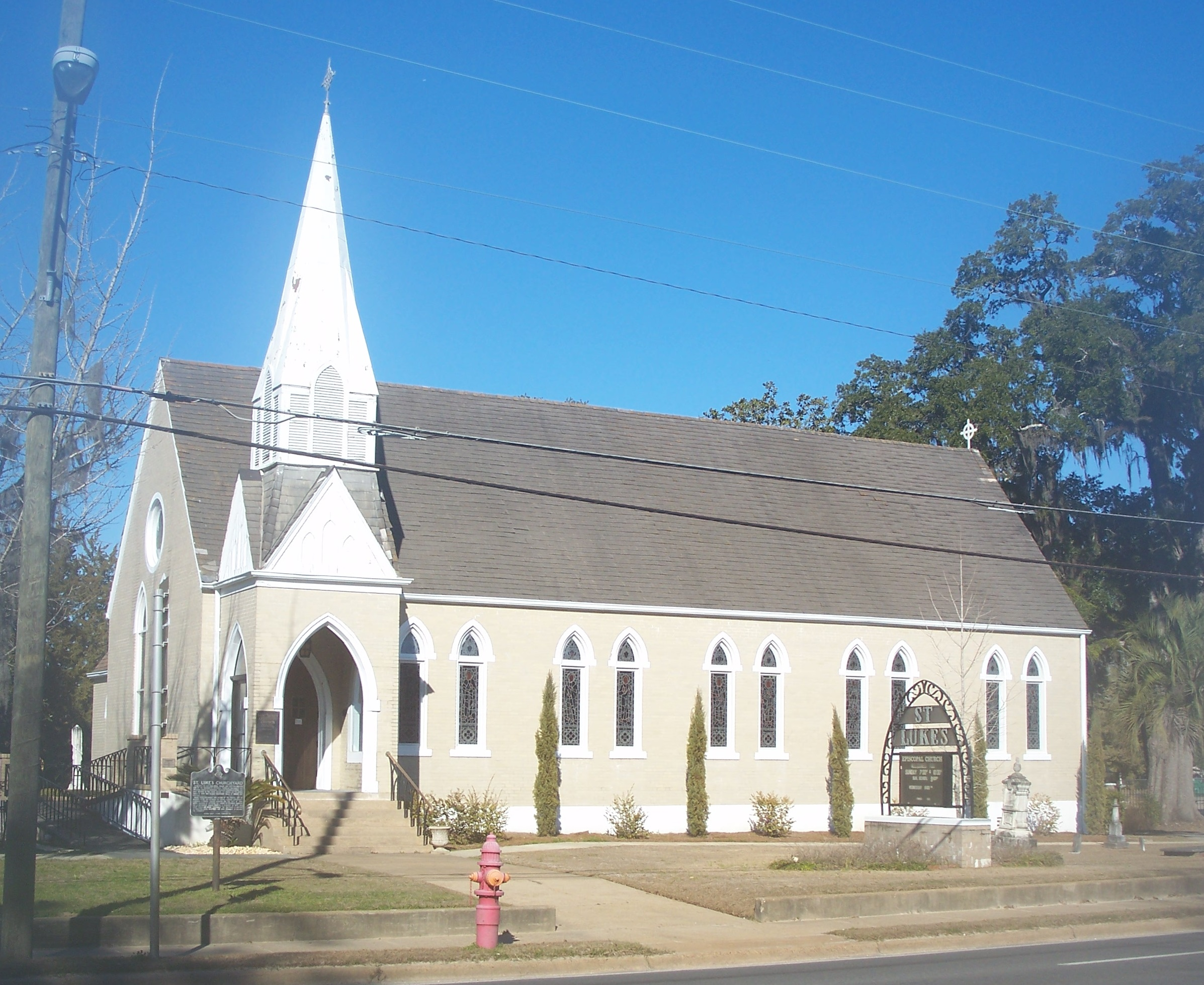
St. Luke's Episcopal Church

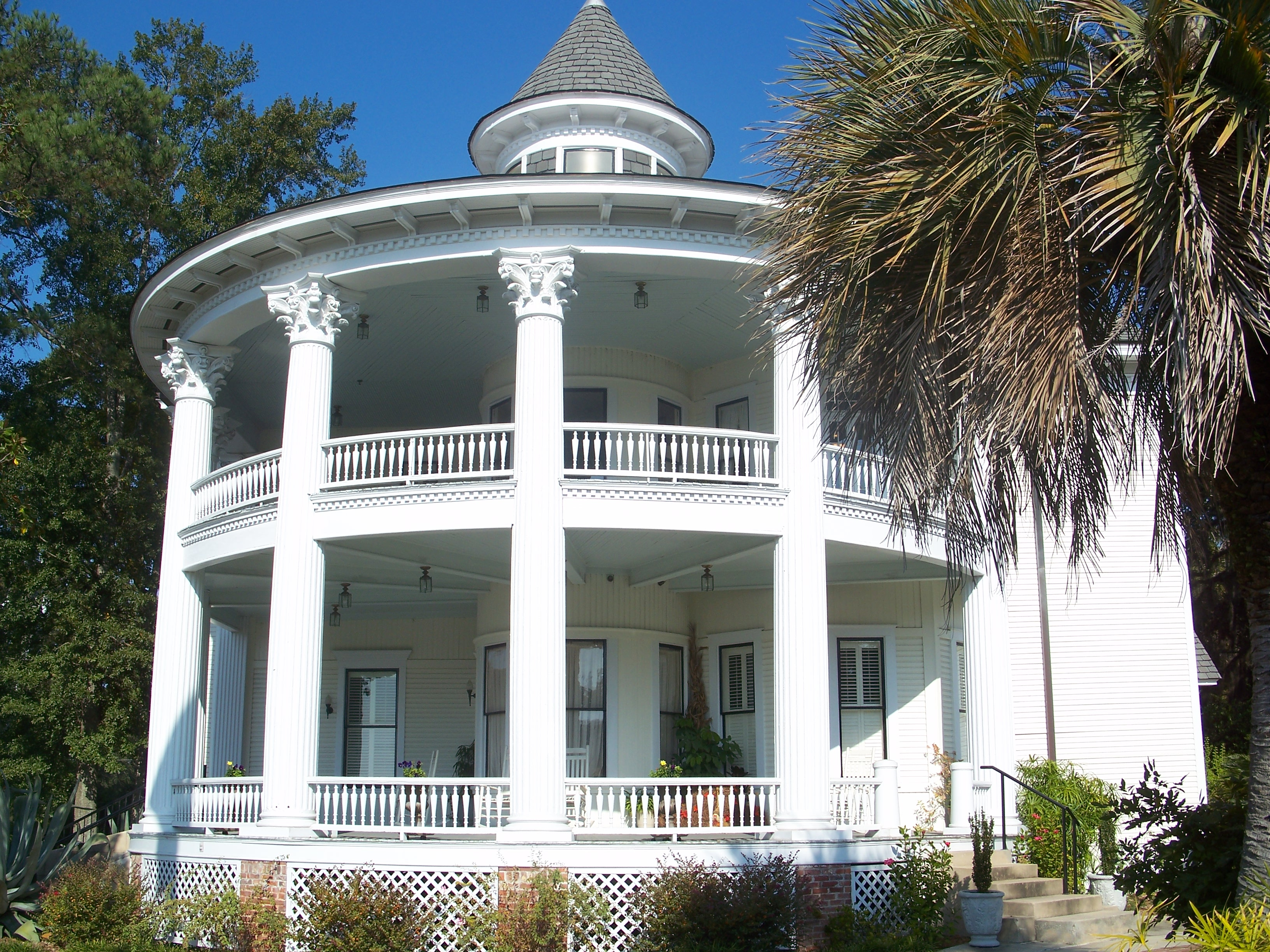
Joseph W. Russ, Jr. House

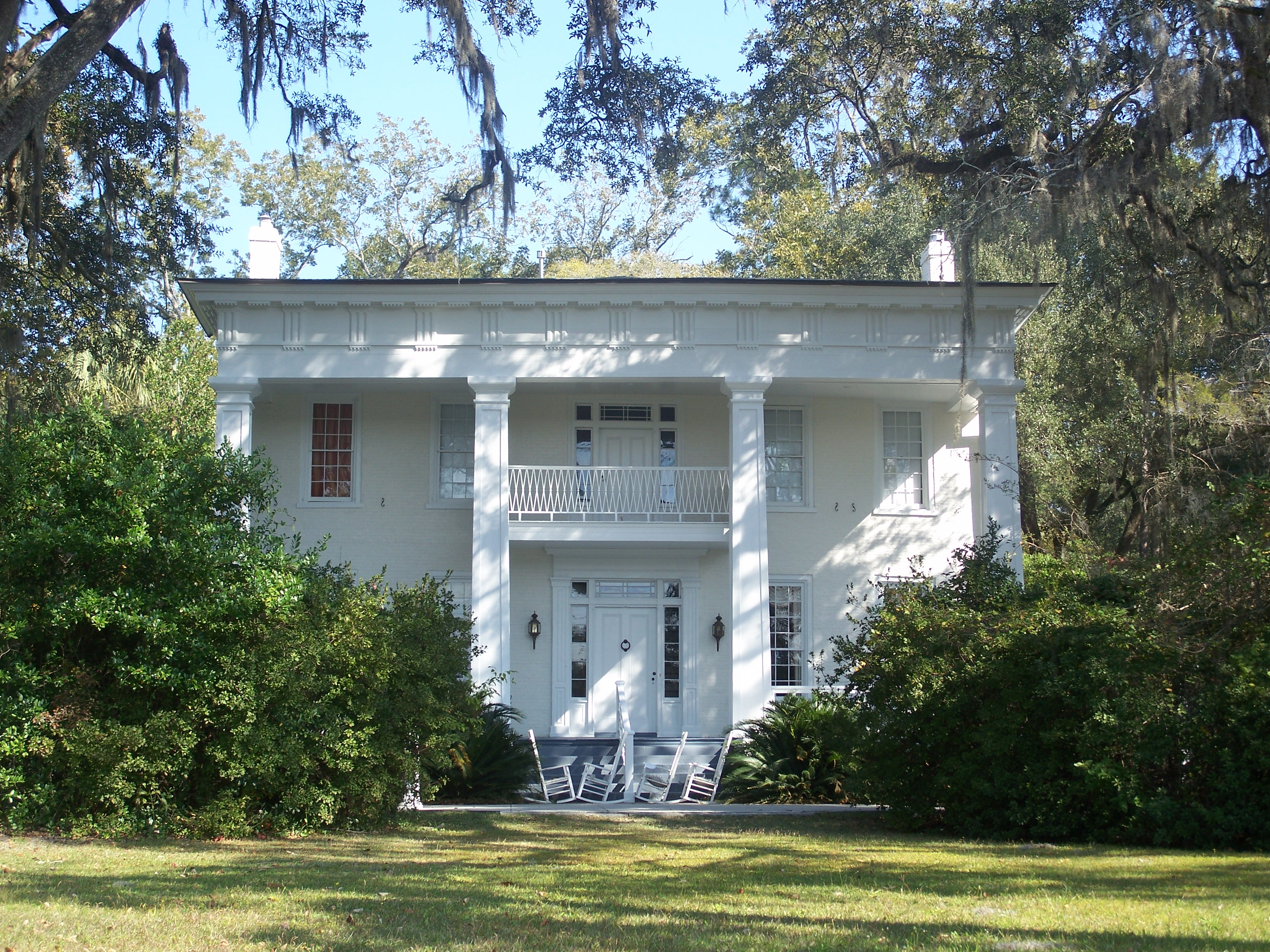
Ely-Criglar Plantation House
