= Ridge Landing Airpark =

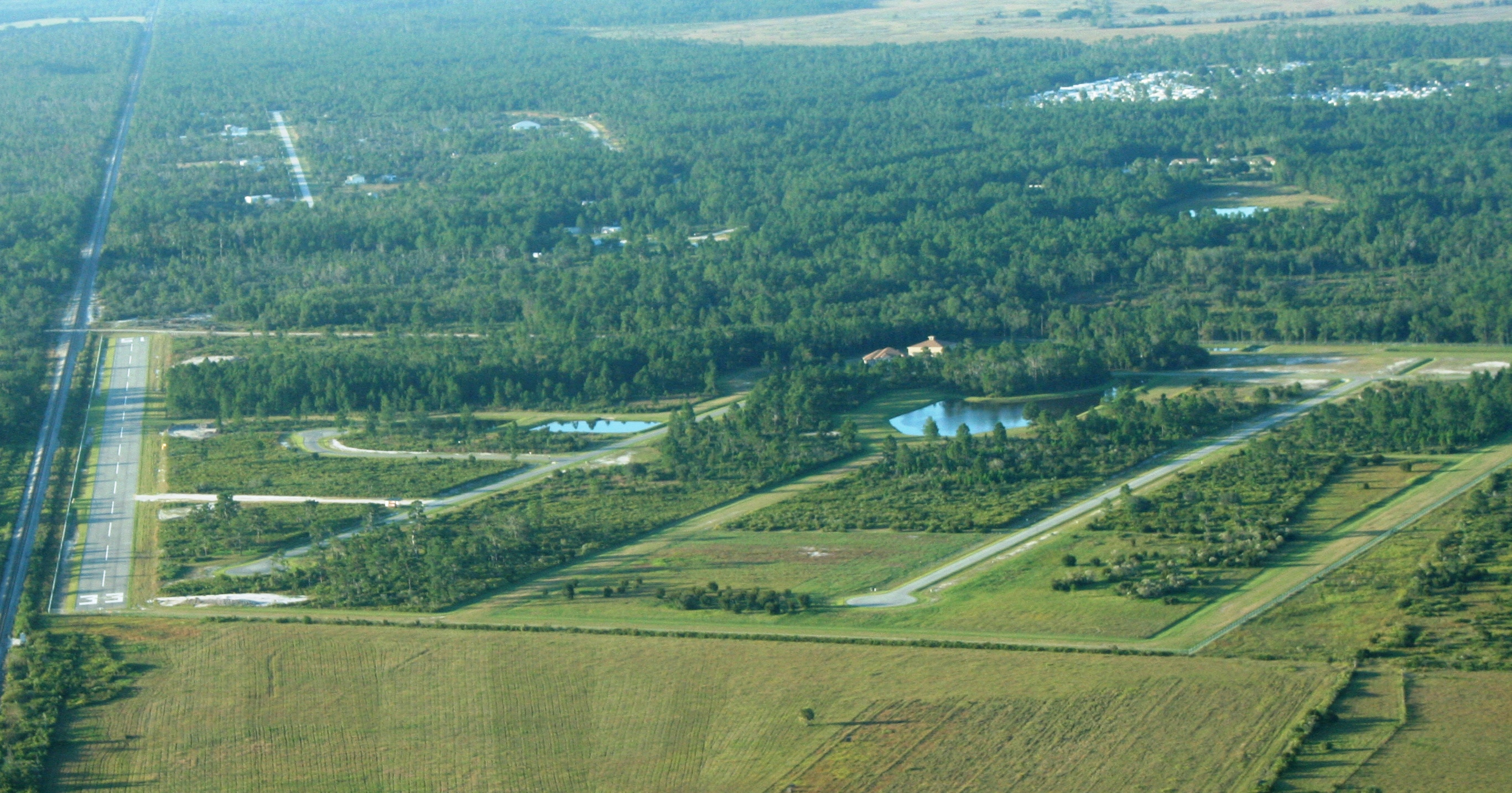
- IATA: none; ICAO: none; FAA LID: 4FL5

Summary
- Airport type: Private
- Owner: John Fazzini
- Operator: Ridge Landing Home Owner's Association
- Location: Frostproof, Florida
- Elevation AMSL: 140 ft (43 m)
- Coordinates: 27°45′19″N 081°35′59″W
- Website: RidgeLandingAirpark.com
- Interactive map of Ridge Landing Airpark

Runways
Direction	Length		Surface
Direction	ft	m	Surface
15/33	3,000	914	Asphalt
- Source: Airport web site and FAA

Ridge Landing Airpark (FAA LID: 4FL5), also known as Ridge Landing Airport, is a private use airpark located four nautical miles (7 km) west of the central business district of Frostproof, Florida, United States. The airpark is located between Orlando and Tampa and equidistant to Miami and Jacksonville. It is privately owned by John Fazzini.

== Facilities ==
The airfield covers an area of 135 acres (550,000 m^{2}) at an elevation of 140 feet (43 m) above mean sea level. It has one asphalt paved runway designated 15/33 which measures 3,000 by 60 feet (914 × 18 m).

Ridge Landing consists of grass taxiways and all roadways separate. The runway has pilot-controlled lighting and is controlled by the Ridge Landing Homeowner's Association.

== Nearest airports ==
Public use airports located in the vicinity include:

- X07 - Lake Wales Municipal Airport (8 nm N)
- KAVO - Avon Park Executive Airport (11 nm S)
- KBOW - Bartow Municipal Airport (15 nm NW)
- KGIF - Winter Haven's Gilbert Airport (20 nm NW)
- KCHN - Wauchula Municipal Airport (21 nm SW)

== See also ==
- List of airports in Florida
