= Florida World War II Army Airfields =

Airfields of the United States Army in Florida during World War II
- Part of United States Army

Site information
- Type: Army Airfields

Site history
- Built: 1940-1944
- In use: 1940-present

During World War II, the United States Army Air Forces (USAAF) established numerous airfields in Florida for antisubmarine defense in the western Atlantic and Gulf of Mexico and for training pilots and aircrews of USAAF fighters, attack planes, and light and medium bombers. After early 1944, heavy bomber crews also trained in the State. The School of Applied Tactics and the Air Proving Grounds which tested and developed new capabilities were also located in Florida.

Most of these airfields were under the command of Third Air Force, the AAF Antisubmarine Command (AAFAC), or the Army Air Forces Training Command (AAFTC). The 26th Antisubmarine Wing was headquartered in Miami. It controlled about forty percent of the AAFAC squadrons.

However the other USAAF support commands, Air Technical Service Command (ATSC) and Air Transport Command (ATC) or Troop Carrier Command, also hadd a significant number of airfields.

It is still possible to find remnants of these wartime airfields as most were converted into municipal airports, while others transitioned to the newly established United States Air Force in 1947.

Two remained as active USAF installations until 1960 and a third until 1962, at which time they, too, were converted into purely civilian airports, the latter as a commercial airport.

A fourth became a joint civil-military commercial airport hosting a Florida Air National Guard fighter-interceptor group until 1968 when the airport was permanently closed and replaced by a newly constructed international airport and concurrently constructed Air National Guard base also hosting the same Air National Guard fighter-interceptor group which today is a full fighter wing.

A fifth airfield remained as an active Strategic Air Command (SAC) bomber, tanker and reconnaissance base with a tenant Aerospace Defense Command (ADC) air command and control squadron. The base later incorporating a commercial jetport and became a joint civil-military airport in 1962 until the closure of the USAF installation in 1975 and its conversion to a civilian commercial international airport in 1976.

A sixth airfield remained as an active Tactical Air Command (TAC), then Air Combat Command (ACC), fighter base until 1995, hosting an active ACC fighter wing, a collocated Air Force Reserve (AFRES) fighter wing, a collocated AFRES rescue squadron, and a TAC-gained Florida Air National Guard (FLANG) fighter alert detachment/operating location. Having been substantially damaged by Hurricane Andrew in 1992, it was converted to air reserve base status as a fighter base for the extant Air Force Reserve Command (AFRC) fighter wing and a fighter alert detachment site for the FLANG.

The remaining airfields that transitioned from USAAF to USAF continue to function as modern day active U.S. Air Force installations under the operational control of Air Force Special Operations Command (AFSOC), Air Force Materiel Command (AFMC), Air Combat Command (ACC) and Air Mobility Command (AMC). In addition, a former World War II-era naval air station was transferred to USAF in the 1950s and remains under the control of the Air Force Space Command (AFSPC) with a tenant ACC-gained AFRC rescue wing assigned as its sole military flying unit. An Air Education and Training Command (AETC) flying training group is also a tenant command on another active naval air station.

Hundreds of the temporary airfield buildings also survive today, with some still used for aeronautical activities and others being used for a variety of other purposes.

== Major Airfields ==
=== Multiple Commands ===
- Jacksonville Army Airfield, 6.2 miles (10.0 km) north of Jacksonville

I Bomber Command (1941)
Transferred to: Army Air Forces Antisubmarine Command (1942-1943)
26th Antisubmarine Wing (Squadrons)
Transferred to: III Bomber Command

Became sub-base of: MacDill Field (1943)
Became sub-base of: Chatham Army Airfield, Georgia (1943-1944)

Transferred to: Air Service Command (1944-1945)
Later: Imeson Field Airport (1947-1968)
Concurrent Use: 125th Fighter-Interceptor Group, Florida Air National Guard, (1947-1968)
Now: Imeson Industrial Park (airfield closed; flight operations relocated to Jacksonville International Airport)

=== Third Air Force ===
- Drew Field, 5.0 miles (8.0 km) west-northwest of Tampa

HQ Third Air Force; III Fighter Command
Also used by: Army Air Forces Antisubmarine Command (1942-1943)
26th Antisubmarine Wing (Squadrons)
337th Fighter Group (Single Engine)
22d Bombardment Training Wing (Heavy)
Drew Field Replacement Training Unit (Heavy Bombardment)
Army Air Force Aircraft Warning Unit Training Center (315th AAFBU)
89th Combat Crew Training Wing
Known sub-bases and auxiliaries

Bartow Army Airfield
Brooksville Army Airfield
Hillsborough Army Airfield

Now: Tampa International Airport (IATA: TPA, ICAO: KTPA, FAA LID: TPA)

- MacDill Field, 7.8 miles (12.6 km) south-southwest of Tampa

HO III Bomber Command
27th Air Base Group
55th Bombardment Training Wing (Heavy)
326th Army Air Force Base Unit
Also used by: Air Transport Command
Known sub-bases and auxiliaries

Bonita Springs Auxiliary Field
Brooksville Army Airfield
Hillsborough Army Airfield
Fort Myers Army Airfield
Lakeland Army Airfield

Now: MacDill Air Force Base (IATA: MCF, ICAO: KMCF, FAA LID: MCF)

- Avon Park Army Airfield, 10.7 miles (17.2 km) east-northeast of Avon Park

Initially Sub-Base of MacDill Field
III Bomber Command
88th Bombardment Group (Heavy)
Avon Park Replacement Training Unit (Heavy Bombardment)
Later: Avon Park Air Force Base (1949-1956)
Now: Avon Park Air Force Range and MacDill AFB Auxiliary Field (ICAO: KAGR, FAA LID: AGR)

- Lakeland Army Airfield / Drane Field, 5.3 miles (8.5 km) southwest of Lakeland

Initially Sub-Base of MacDill Field (Drane Field)
III Bomber Command
60th Flying Training Detachment (Medium Bombardment)
Transferred to: III Fighter Command (1943)
Commando Squadron Fighter Training School
Now: Lakeland Linder International Airport (1960-Present) (IATA: LAL, ICAO: KLAL, FAA LID: LAL)

- Pinellas Army Airfield, 9.9 miles (15.9 km) north-northwest of St. Petersburg

III Fighter Command
Initially Sub Base of Sarasota Army Airfield
Pinellas Replacement Training Unit (Fighter, Single Engine)
Now: St. Petersburg-Clearwater International Airport (IATA: PIE, ICAO: KPIE, FAA LID: PIE)
Concurrent Use: Coast Guard Air Station Clearwater and Army Reserve Army Aviation Support Facility

- Dale Mabry Army Airfield, 3.4 miles (5.5 km) west of Tallahassee

III Fighter Command
338th Fighter Group (Single Engine)
Dale Mabry Replacement Depot
335th Army Air Force Base Unit (Replacement, Fighter)
Known sub-bases and auxiliaries

Thomasville Army Airfield (Georgia)
Harris Neck Army Airfield (Georgia)
Perry Army Airfield
Carrabelle Flight Strip#2

Later: Dale Mabry Field (commercial airport) (1946-1961)
Now: Campus of Tallahassee Community College (airfield closed)

- Bartow Army Airfield, 4.9 miles (7.9 km) northeast of Bartow

III Fighter Command
54th Fighter Group (Single Engine)
Bartow Replacement Unit (Fighter, Single-Engine)
Later: Bartow Air Base (1950-1961)
Now: Bartow Municipal Airport (IATA: BOW, ICAO: KBOW, FAA LID: BOW)

- Sarasota Army Airfield, 4.4 miles (7.1 km) north-northwest of Sarasota

III Bomber Command
Later: III Fighter Command
337th Fighter Group (Single Engine)
Sarasota Replacement Training Unit (Fighter, Single Engine)
Known sub-bases and auxiliaries

Fort Myers Army Airfield
Lake Wales Army Airfield
Pinellas Army Airfield
Punta Gorda Army Airfield
Immokalee Army Airfield

Now: Sarasota-Bradenton International Airport (IATA: SRQ, ICAO: KSRQ, FAA LID: SRQ)

- Venice Army Airfield, 2.1 miles (3.4 km) south-southeast of Venice

III Fighter Command
Also used by 27th Service Group (Air Service Command)
53d Fighter Group (Single Engine)
Venice Replacement Training Unit (Fighter, Single Engine)
422d Army Air Force Base Unit
Now: Venice Municipal Airport (IATA: VNC, ICAO: KVNC, FAA LID: VNC)

=== AAF Training Command ===
Eastern Flying Training Command

- Marianna Army Airfield, 5.1 miles (8.2 km) north-northeast of Marianna

17th Single Engine Flying Training Group (Advanced-Single Engine)
325th Army Air Force Base Unit
Known sub-bases and auxiliaries

Ellis Auxiliary Field
Malone Auxiliary Field
Bascom Auxiliary Field
Alliance Auxiliary Field

Later: Graham Air Base (1951-1960)
Now: Marianna Municipal Airport (ICAO: KMAI, FAA LID: MAI)

- Hendricks Field, 6.6 miles (10.6 km) east-southeast of Sebring

Specialized Pilot Training School (Four Engine)
76th Army Air Force Base Unit
Known sub-bases and auxiliaries

Conners Auxiliary Field
Immokalee Army Airfield

Now: Sebring Regional Airport (IATA: SEF, ICAO: KSEF, FAA LID: SEF)

- Buckingham Army Airfield, 10 miles (16 km) east of Fort Myers

Army Air Forces Flexible Gunnery School
38th Flexible Gunnery Training Group
328th Army Air Force Base Unit
Known sub-bases and auxiliaries

Naples Army Airfield

Now: Buckingham Field Airport (FAA LID: FL59)

- Tyndall Field, 7.5 miles (12.1 km) southeast of Panama City

Army Air Forces Flexible Gunnery School
38th Flexible Gunnery Training Group
69th Army Air Force Base Unit
Known sub-bases and auxiliaries

Apalachicola Army Airfield

Now: Tyndall Air Force Base (IATA: PAM, ICAO: KPAM, FAA LID: PAM)

Eastern Technical Training Command'

- Boca Raton Army Airfield, 2.1 miles (3.4 km) northeast of Boca Raton

3501st Army Air Force Base Unit (Technical School, Radar)
Airfield became: Boca Raton Airport (IATA: BCT, ICAO: KBCT, FAA LID: BCT)
Station became: Florida Atlantic University

==== AAF Contract Flying Schools ====
- Avon Park Municipal Airport, 1.4 miles (2.3 km) west-southwest of Avon Park

Lodwick Aviation Military Academy
61st Army Air Force Fight Training Detachment (Contract Flying)
Known sub-bases and auxiliaries

Avon Park Auxiliary Field#1
Avon Park Auxiliary Field#2
Avon Park Auxiliary Field#3
Avon Park Auxiliary Field#4

Now: Avon Park Executive Airport (IATA: AVO, ICAO: KAVO, FAA LID: AVO)

- Lodwick Field, 2.1 miles (3.4 km) north-northeast of Lakeland

Lodwick Aviation Military Academy
60th Flying Training Detachment (Contract Pilot School)
Also: Royal Air Force training
Known sub-bases and auxiliaries

Coronet Auxiliary Field
Haldeman-Elder Auxiliary Field
Hampton Auxiliary Field
Lodwick Auxiliary Field
Northeast Auxiliary Field#1
Northwest Auxiliary Field#3
Gilbert Auxiliary Field

Now: Closed 1957, currently recreation area

- Riddle Field, 7.4 miles (11.9 km) west-southwest of Clewiston

Riddle-McKay Aero College
75th Flying Training Detachment (Contract Pilot School)
Also: Royal Air Force training
Now: Airglades Airport (FAA LID: 2IS)

- Taylor Field Airport, 2.1 miles (3.4 km) southwest of Ocala

Greenville Aviation School
Also operated: AAFSAT Ocala Bombing Range
Now: Closed 1962, currently industrial park

- Carlstrom Field, 6.4 miles (10.3 km) southeast of Arcadia

Riddle Aeronautical Institute
53d Flying Training Detachment (Contract Pilot School)
2148th Army Air Force Base Unit (Contract Pilot School)
Also: Royal Air Force training
Known sub-bases and auxiliaries

Arcadia Airport
Myrtle Auxiliary Field
Southwest Auxiliary Field
Sparkman Auxiliary Field
Wells Auxiliary Field

Now: Closed 1945, currently Desoto County Juvenile Correctional Complex

- Dorr Field, 11.6 miles (18.7 km) east of Arcadia

Riddle Aeronautical Institute
54th Flying Training Detachment (Contract Pilot School)
2148th Army Air Force Base Unit (Contract Pilot School)
Also: Royal Air Force training
Known sub-bases and auxiliaries

Dorr Auxiliary Field#1
Dorr Auxiliary Field#2
Dorr Auxiliary Field#3
Dorr Auxiliary Field#4

Now: Closed 1945, currently Desoto County Correctional Institution

- Chapman Field, 11.1 miles (17.9 km) south-southwest of Miami

Civil, AAF, Navy training usage
Riddle Aeronautical Institute
Now: Closed 1947, partly Chapman Field Subtropical Horticulture Research Station

=== Army Air Forces School of Applied Tactics ===
- Orlando Army Air Base, 2.9 miles (4.7 km) east of Orlando (1941-1947)

Initially used by: I Bomber Command (1941-1942)
Initially used by: Army Air Forces Antisubmarine Command
13th Bombardment Group (1942-1943)
HQ Army Air Forces School of Applied Tactics (1942)
9th Bombardment Group (Heavy)
50th Fighter Group (Special)
HQ Army Air Force Interceptor Command School (1943)
481st Night Fighter Operational Training Group
Known sub-bases and auxiliaries

Brooksville Army Airfield
Bushnell Army Airfield
Kissimmee Army Airfield
Cross City Army Airfield (1942-1946); Cross City Air Force Station (1958-1970)
Zephyrhills Army Airfield

Airfield became: Orlando Municipal Airport (1946)
Now: Orlando Executive Airport (IATA: ORL, ICAO: KORL, FAA LID: ORL)
Ground Station became: Orlando Air Force Base (1947-1968)
Ground Station transferred to: United States Navy as
Naval Training Center Orlando (1968-1999)
Now: Baldwin Park neighborhood of Orlando

- Pinecastle Army Airfield, 8.7 miles (14.0 km) south-southeast of Orlando

sub-base of Orlando Army Airbase (1942-1945)
AAFSAT Technical Center
Transferred to: Air Proving Ground Command (1945)
Later: Pinecastle Air Force Base (1951-1958);
McCoy Air Force Base (1958-1975)
Now: Orlando International Airport (IATA: MCO, ICAO: KMCO, FAA LID: MCO)

- Alachua Army Airfield, 4.2 miles (6.8 km) northeast of Gainesville

sub-base of Orlando Army Airbase (1942-1943)
AAFSAT Medium Bombardment training unit
415th Bombardment Group (Medium)
Transferred to: III Fighter Command (1943)
Commando Squadron Fighter Training School
Known sub-bases and auxiliaries

Cross City Army Airfield
Keystone Army Airfield
Leesburg Army Airfield
Montbrook Army Airfield

Now: Gainesville Regional Airport (IATA: GNV, ICAO: KGNV, FAA LID: GNV)

- Dunnellon Army Airfield, 5.2 miles (8.4 km) east of Dunnellon

sub-base of Orlando Army Airbase (1942-1944)
AAFSAT Night Fighter Department (Dark)
420th Night Fighter Squadron
Transferred to: III Fighter Command (1944)
Commando Troop Carrier Training School
Known sub-bases and auxiliaries

Canal Auxiliary Field

Now: Dunnellon/Marion County Airport (FAA LID: X35)

=== Air Transport Command ===
- Homestead Army Air Base, 6.0 miles (9.7 km) east-northeast of Homestead

Station 8, Caribbean Wing, ATC
563d Army Air Force Base Unit
Was: Dade County Airport (1945-1955)
Was: Homestead Air Force Base (1955-1994)
Now: Homestead Air Reserve Base (1994-Present) (IATA: HST, ICAO: KHST, FAA LID: HST)

- Miami Army Airfield (36th Street Airport), Miami

Joint Civil/Army Airfield use
Also used by: Army Air Forces Antisubmarine Command
HQ 45th Bombardment Group (I Bomber Command) (1942)
HQ 26th Antisubmarine Wing (1942-1943)
Army Air Forces Pilot School (Miscellaneous Fields)
Operated by Pan American Airways
Later: : 408th Army Air Force Base Unit (Contract pilot training)
1595th Army Air Force Base Unit (First Foreign Transport Group)
1105th Army Air Force Base Unit (ATC Caribbean Wing)
Now: Miami International Airport (IATA: MIA, ICAO: KMIA, FAA LID: MIA)

- Morrison Field, 3.4 miles (5.5 km) southwest of West Palm Beach

Initially used by: 8th Pursuit Wing, III Interceptor Command
Also used by: Army Air Forces Antisubmarine Command
26th Antisubmarine Wing (Squadrons)
HQ Caribbean Wing, ATC
427th Army Air Force Base Unit
Also used by: United States Navy
Later: Palm Beach Air Force Base (1951-1962)
Now: Palm Beach International Airport (IATA: PBI, ICAO: KPBI, FAA LID: PBI)

=== Proving Ground Command ===
- Eglin Field, 3.1 miles (5.0 km) southwest of Valparaiso

HQ Army Air Forces Proving Ground Command
Known sub-bases and auxiliaries

Eglin Air Force Auxiliary Field #1

Now Eglin AFB Aux Fld #1, Wagner Field

Eglin Air Force Auxiliary Field #2

Now: Eglin AFB Aux Fld #2 Pierce Field

Eglin Air Force Auxiliary Field #3

Now: Eglin AFB Aux Fld #3, Duke Field

Eglin Air Force Auxiliary Field #4

Now: Eglin AFB Aux Fld #4, Peel Field

Eglin Air Force Auxiliary Field #5

Now: Eglin AFB Aux Fld #5, Piccolo Field

Eglin Air Force Auxiliary Field #6

Now: Eglin AFB Aux Fld #6 Biancur Field and Camp Rudder (1 October 1958-Present)

Eglin Air Force Auxiliary Field #7

Now: Eglin AFB Aux Fld #7, Epler Field

Eglin Air Force Auxiliary Field #8

Now: Eglin AFB Auf Fld #8, Baldsiefen Field

Eglin Air Force Auxiliary Field #9

Previously Eglin AFB Aux Fld #9, Hurlburt Field (1947-1955)
Now: Hurlburt Field

Eglin Air Force Auxiliary Field #10 (Dillon Field) (1943)

Now: Naval Outlying Landing Field Choctaw (United States Navy)

Santa Rosa Island Range Complex

Now: Santa Rosa Island Range Complex

Now: Eglin Air Force Base (IATA: VPS, ICAO: KVPS, FAA LID: VPS)

== Minor Airfields ==
- Naval Auxiliary Air Station (NAAS) Boca Chica, 6.1 miles (9.8 km) east-northeast of Key West

Used by: Army Air Forces Antisubmarine Command (1942-1943)
26th Antisubmarine Wing (Squadrons)
Now: Naval Air Station Key West (IATA: NQX, ICAO: KNQX, FAA LID: NQX)

- Naval Outlying Field (OLF) Marathon, 2.6 miles (4.2 km) east-northeast of Marathon

Used by: Army Air Forces Antisubmarine Command (1942-1943)
26th Antisubmarine Wing (Squadrons)
Now: Florida Keys Marathon Airport (IATA: MTH, ICAO: KMTH, FAA LID: MTH)

- Naval Outlying Field Meacham, 1.5 miles (2.4 km) east of Key West

Used by: Army Air Forces Antisubmarine Command (1942-1943)
26th Antisubmarine Wing (Squadrons)
Now: Key West International Airport (IATA: EYW, ICAO: KEYW, FAA LID: EYW)

- Lantana Airport, 8.7 miles (14.0 km) south-southwest of West Palm Beach

Used by: Army Air Forces Antisubmarine Command (1942-1943)
26th Antisubmarine Wing (Squadrons)
Now: Palm Beach County Park Airport (IATA: LNA, ICAO: KLNA, FAA LID: LNA)

- Flagler Beach Airport, Flagler Beach

Civil Air Patrol Use
Used by: Army Air Forces Antisubmarine Command (1942-1943)
26th Antisubmarine Wing (Squadrons)
Closed appx. 1945, now abandoned

- Jasper CAA Site#43, 2.8 miles (4.5 km) south-southeast of Jasper

Likely Emergency landing airfield
Closed appx. 1950, now farmland

- Pomona Field, 0.9 miles (1.4 km) east of Pomona Park

Likely Emergency landing airfield
Now: Pomona Landing Airport (FAA LID: 78FL)

- Quincy Municipal Airport, 1.7 miles (2.7 km) east-northeast of Quincy

Likely Emergency landing airfield
Now: Quincy Municipal Airport (FAA LID: 2J9)

- Withlacoochee Army Airfield, 8.2 miles (13.2 km) east of Lacoochee

Used by the Dugway Proving Ground Mobile Chemical Warfare Testing Unit
Now: Closed appx. 1945, now abandoned
