= Isla San José (Panama) =

Second-largest island in the Pearl Islands

Coordinates: 8°15′N 79°07′W

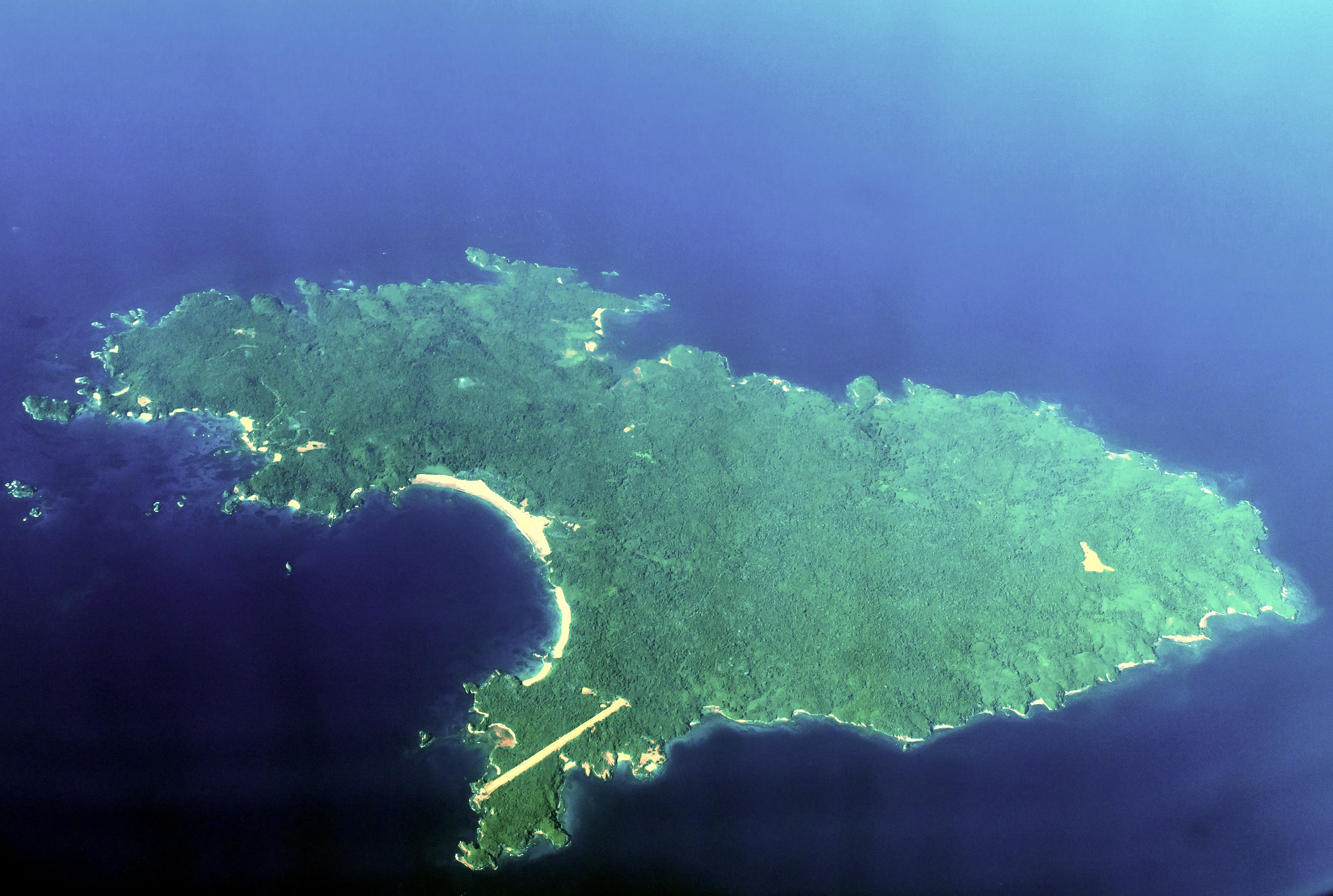
Aerial view

Isla San José is the second-largest island in the Pearl Islands, off the Pacific coast of Panama. The privately owned island has an area of 44 square kilometres (17 mi^{2}). At the 2000 census, it had a population of 10 people. Thousands of wild pigs and deer populate Isla San Jose, which has a rugged, rocky shoreline and over 50 beaches.

The island is served by San José Airport.

== History ==
A unit of U.S. soldiers tested chemical arms from 1945 to 1947 on the then deserted island, leaving behind at least eight unexploded 500 and 1,000-pound bombs. A U.S. military text states that the larger bombs contained phosgene and cyanogen chloride, and smaller ones mustard gas. Other reports state that the soldiers also tested VX nerve gas and sarin. Claims of abandoned minefields containing thousands of armed chemical mines have been made, but no evidence of this has been presented. An unknown but large amount of munitions was also dropped into the sea around the island. Earl Tupper, the founder of Tupperware, was owner of the island. In 2022, the island was the filming location of the 2nd season for the German survival show 7 vs. Wild.

== See also ==
- Air raid on Bari
- Agent Orange
- Bushnell Army Airfield
- Project 112
- Project SHAD
- Unit 516 (Japanese abandonment of weapons in China)
- Withlacoochee Army Airfield
