= Lodwick Field =

Airport in Florida, United States

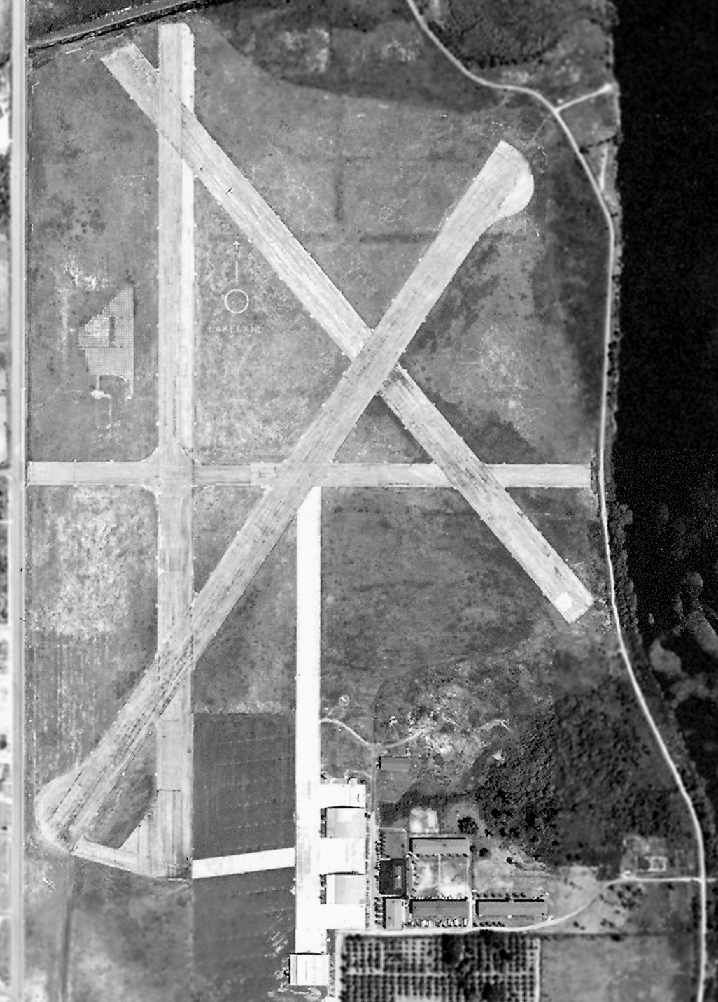
- 1952 airphoto
- IATA: none; ICAO: none

Summary
- Serves: Lakeland, Florida
- Coordinates: 28°04′21″N 081°56′57″W

Map
- Location of Lodwick Field

Lodwick Field is a former airport located 2.1 miles (3.4 km) north-northeast of Lakeland, Florida. It was closed about 1960, with all flight operations being moved to the larger Lakeland Linder International Airport.

== History ==
Lodwick Field was built in the mid-1930s by the Works Progress Administration as the municipal airport for Lakeland, Florida. It replaced the smaller Haldeman-Elder Field (southeast of the city) which was proving inadequate to meet the city's needs. The airport of the 1930s had two paved runways, a north-south strip of 2,456 feet (749 m), and an east-west one of 2,475 feet (754 m). Two wider sod runways ran northwest-southeast (2,562 feet (781 m)) and southwest-northeast (3,054 feet (931 m)) and were later paved. To the east along the shore of Lake Parker was a seaplane ramp and dock. In 1937, Lakeland commenced its first regular commercial airline service when National Airlines began flying its Lodestar planes from Municipal Airport.

In 1940, the Lincoln Airplane & Flying School was moved from Lincoln, Nebraska, to Lakeland's more favorable climate. The owner, EJ. Sias, later sold the flying school to Albert L. Lodwick (1904–1961), whose aviation career to that point included nine years with the Curtiss-Wright Corporation and the presidency of the Stinson Aircraft Company. The school was renamed the Lakeland School of Aeronautics in 1941 and later, the Lodwick School of Aeronautics. The school headquartered at the airport, and the Lodwick Aviation Military Academy in Avon Park, provided Army Air Corps cadets with primary flight training including time on PT-17 Stearman trainers. In addition to the main airport, the school operated the following sub-bases and auxiliary airfields:

- Coronet Auxiliary Field 28°01′01″N 082°06′02″W
- Haldeman-Elder Auxiliary Field 28°00′50″N 081°54′17″W
- Hampton Auxiliary Field 28°00′55″N 081°48′25″W
- Lodwick Auxiliary Field 28°02′18″N 081°56′44″W
- Northeast Auxiliary Field #1 28°07′11″N 081°48′44″W
- Northwest Auxiliary Field #3 28°07′28″N 081°58′55″W
- Gilbert Auxiliary Field 28°03′46″N 081°45′12″W

In addition to the military academy trainees, Lodwick also trained foreign students. The first class of cadets from England's Royal Air Force (RAF) arrived at Lodwick in 1941 and graduated from the ten-week training course on August 16 of that year. The last RAF trainees left in October 1942 and relocated to Riddle Field, near Clewiston, Florida. The Lodwick School of Aeronautics graduated more than six thousand cadets before it closed in August 1945.

Albert Lodwick founded Lodwick Aircraft Industries in February 1946 to convert war surplus military aircraft to non-military use. The Lakeland City Commission renamed the airport as Al Lodwick Field in 1948. However, by the early 1950s, the number of military aircraft available for conversion to commercial use dwindled and most of the surplus parts and equipment it contracted to sell were obsolete and had no market. By 1954, the company was moribund. It had lost most of its assets in a bank foreclosure and ceased operations in September. Al Lodwick moved to the Miami area in 1955.

With the closure of Lodwick Aircraft, Lodwick remained open for a few more years, but in the summer of 1957 Lakeland decided to move its airport to the much larger former military air base at Drane Field in south Lakeland.

=== Closure and Tiger Town ===
Beginning in 1953, the Detroit Tigers Tiger Town spring training complex was constructed over part of the airport, and with the closure of Lodwick Aircraft, Lodwick Field continued to be used by the city for several more years as its principal airport, but gradually more and more of the complex was converted for use as the spring training home of the Detroit Tigers professional baseball team. In 1958, the Tigers' spring training complex was expanded over the remains of the Lodwick Aircraft facility, and in 1960 the airport itself was closed.

Expansion continued of the Tiger town complex, and in 1966 Joker Marchant Stadium was built. The three arched-roof hangars of the former airport have been renovated and are used for various purposes. The most recent renovations to Tiger Town included the removal of a runway beyond the outfield wall. The facility is also the regular season home of the Class A Florida State League Lakeland Flying Tigers.

== See also ==
- Florida World War II Army Airfields
- 29th Flying Training Wing (World War II)
