= Boca Raton Army Air Field =

WWII US Air Force airfield in Palm Beach County, Florida

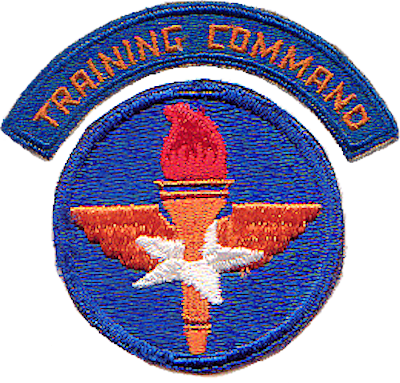
Boca Raton Army Air Field
- Part of Army Air Force Training Command
- Located near: Boca Raton, Florida
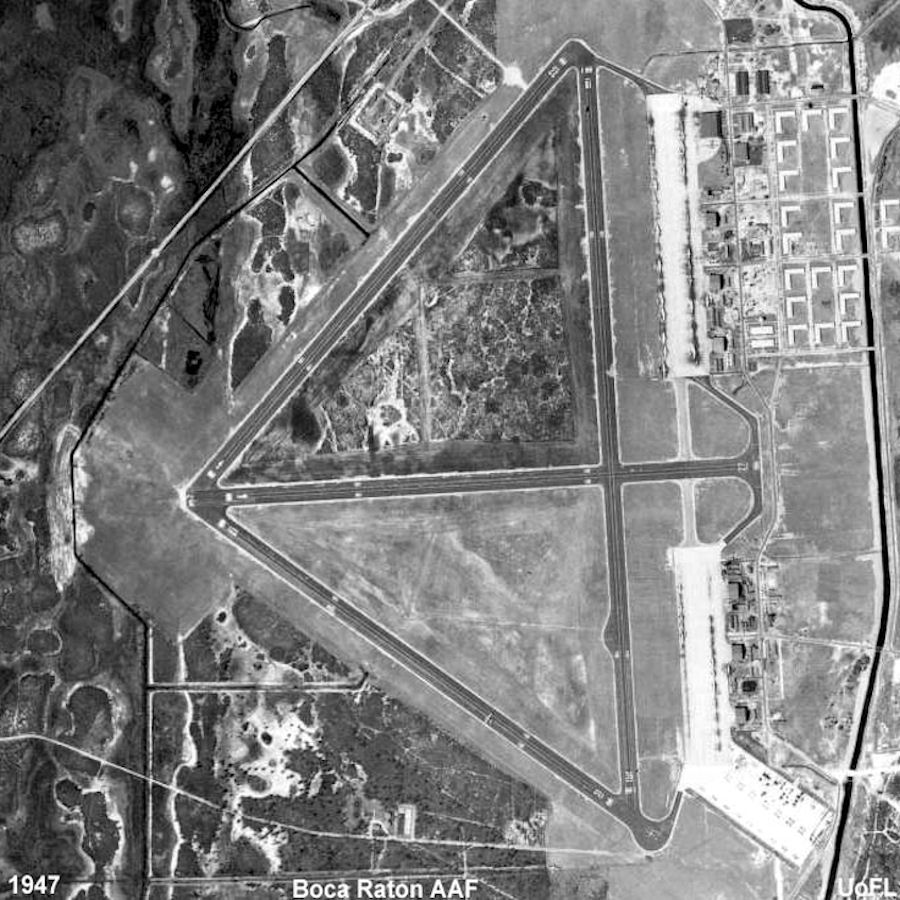
- Boca Raton Army Airfield – Airfield

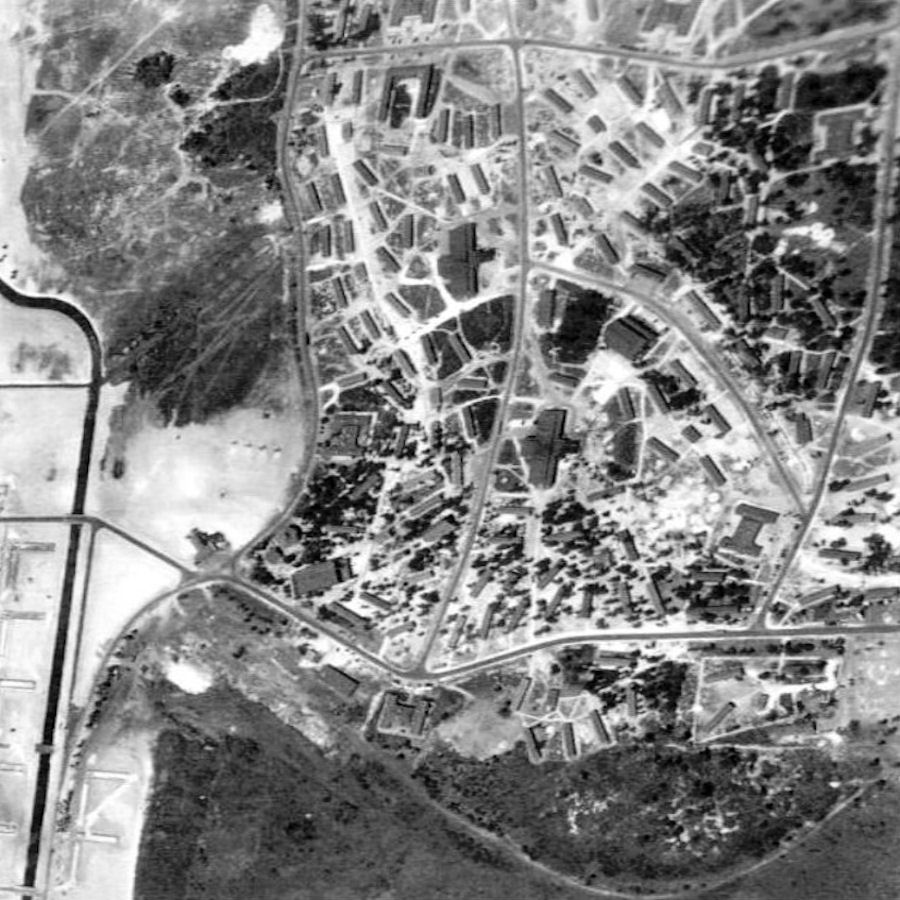
- Training School Area, located to the north and east of the airfield, on the east side of the El Rio Canal. This part of the base was largely destroyed in 1947 by a hurricane.

Location
- Coordinates: 26°22′33″N 080°06′07″W

Site history
- In use: 1940–1945

Boca Raton Army Air Field was a World War II United States Army Air Forces airfield, located 1.7 miles (2.7 km) northwest of the 1940s borders of Boca Raton, Florida. During World War II, it operated the only training for the then new and secret technology of radar. Closed in 1946, due to annexation the former base is now within the city of Boca Raton; the land is currently occupied by the Boca Raton Airport, Florida Atlantic University and Palm Beach State College.

== History ==
=== Origins ===
In 1936, the Boca Raton Airport was a small city airport. In 1941, in response to the emerging Axis threat, the United States began to rapidly mobilize and expand its armed forces. In addition to enlarging its Army and Navy, the US also sought to expand its air forces. With America entering into World War II, the Army Air Corps suddenly underwent rapid expansion. The mild winter climate and the flat terrain of South Florida marked the areas as ideal for flying and aviation training.

In the early-1940s, Boca Raton's population numbered only 723. This enabled the United States government to take thousands of acres of land for its use without having to relocate a large number of people. The decision to locate the base at Boca Raton was made because of the already existing city airfield and the land which was available for its expansion. The land was acquired from the farmers through the process of condemnation. However, this is not to say that the establishment of the military airfield was without controversy. A majority of the land was acquired from Japanese-American farmers from the failing Yamato Colony, the land having been seized through the process of eminent domain, leaving many Japanese-Americans little recourse in the early days of World War II.

Eventually three major air bases, Homestead in south Dade County, Morrison Field in West Palm Beach (which later became the Palm Beach International Airport), and Boca Raton Army Air Field were developed in the first years of the war.

Boca Raton AAF included 5,860 acres and stretched from Dixie Highway on the East to Military Trail on the West and from the current Spanish River Blvd. on the North to Palmetto Park Road to some point on the South. Areas like Old Floresta remained in private hands and many of the houses in the subdivision were rented to air force officers and their families.

Beginning with the then existing Boca Raton Airport, 3,500 construction workers and $11 million in government appropriations converted the facility into the Army Air Force's only radar training station during World War II.

Construction of the base began in June 1941 and continued to expand during the war. Over nine million dollars was spent constructing the facility and an average of 1,200 civilians worked on the base. As the Army Air Force's only radar training station during World War II, the Boca Raton base grew to eight hundred buildings with a troop strength of more than 16,000.

=== Eastern Technical Training Command ===
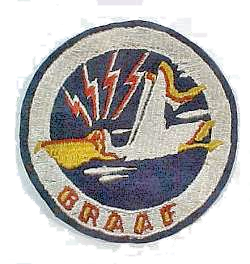
Emblem of the AAFTC Radar school at Boca Raton AAF (1943–1947)

The new base was opened on 1 June 1942. Flight operations from the airfield began during the summer. Boca Raton AAF was placed under the jurisdiction of the Army Air Forces Eastern Technical Training Command 3501st Base Unit (Technical School, Radar).

Other units assigned to Boca Raton were the 319th Base Headquarters and Air Base Squadron, which performed the base housekeeping duties, and the Air Technical Service Command 13th Sub Depot, which provided logistical support for transient aircraft at the airfield, although no permanent aircraft were stationed at the Base other than some light transport and courier aircraft.

Although planned as a radar training base from the onset, one of the first missions of Boca Raton AAF was anti-submarine patrols over the Florida Atlantic coast. The 26th Anti-Submarine Wing, based in Miami, deployed A-29 Hudson, B-34 Lexington and Lockheed B-37 Ventura light bombers, all equipped with anti-submarine equipment, which operated from the new airfield. The antisubmarine forces remained until mid-1943 when the Navy took over the coastal patrol mission. The Boca Raton airfield also was used as a way-station for planes being ferried by Air Transport Command over the South Atlantic Ferry Route, its principal ferrying route for combat and transport aircraft being deployed to Europe, North Africa, the Soviet Union and the China Burma India Theater. The use of the field by Transport Command continued throughout the war.

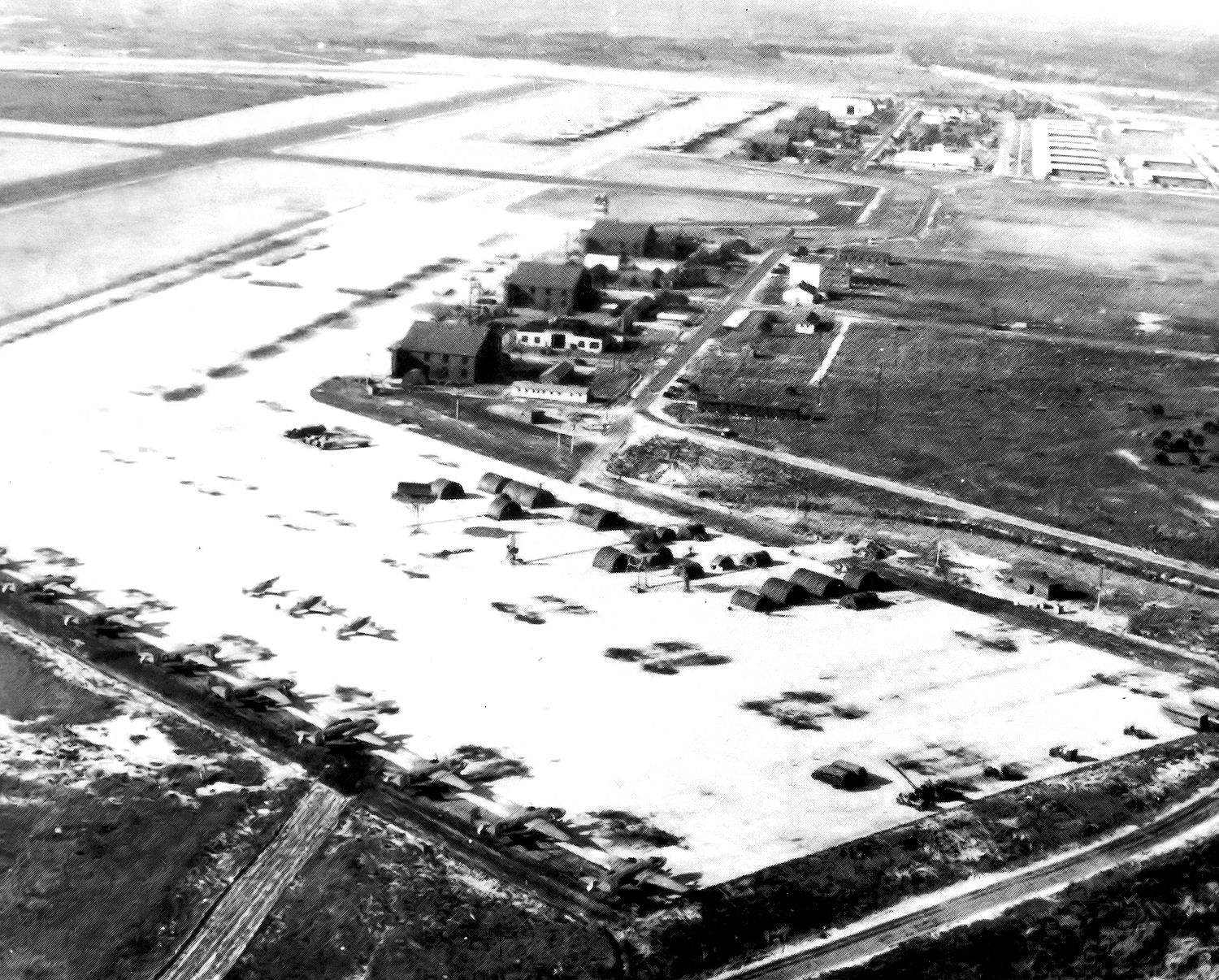
Boca Raton Army Airfield – Flightline – 1944

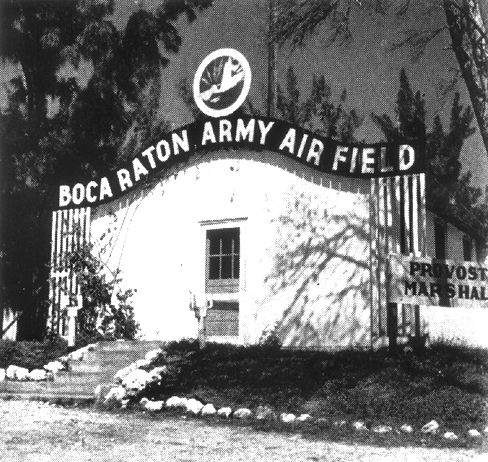
Provost Office

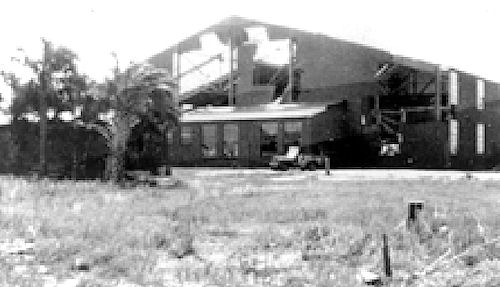
Destroyed aircraft hangar after hurricane – 1947

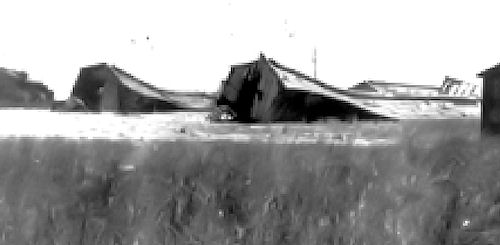
Destroyed buildings after hurricane – 1947

The main mission, however, of Boca Raton AAF was the training of Air Force personnel in the use of radar. The 3501st BU provided instruction courses for airborne radar operators, mechanics, and electronic officers. Aviation cadets sometimes spent up to 20 hours per day on academic and military training. Classes included engineering, aerodynamics, and communications. After finishing their education at Yale University, these cadets were commissioned officers. During World War II, radar technology was classified Top Secret. Personnel selected to attend the Radar School were highly qualified and rigorously selected, as well as having to pass a rigorous background investigation.

These courses meant an ever-increasing need for flight training and for aircraft. The heavy volume of maritime traffic in the Atlantic provided ample opportunity for practice in radar applications. The airfield operated 24 hours a day with Boeing B-17 Flying Fortresses, Consolidated B-24 Liberators, North American B-25 Mitchells, and Martin B-26 Marauders supplied by Third Air Force constantly flying. Radar-bombing runs were frequently made on the Avon Park Bombing Range. In addition to teaching the operators, Boca Raton AF was responsible for installing Radar in aircraft and for training pilots in the use of the equipment. Training for Boeing B-29 Superfortress crews from MacDill Field using Radar also took place here during the last year of the war.

Life at the Boca Raton base was almost completely self-contained. In fact, the citizens of Boca Raton soon came to be dependent upon the base's recreational, entertainment, and medical facilities. The Army Air Forces also took over the luxurious oceanfront Boca Raton Club to house trainees and officers from the radar training school. Residents reported conditions were anything but elegant, however. The expensive furnishings had been replaced by standard army bunks housing eight to a room, the swimming pool was boarded over, poor water pressure made bathing difficult, and a rigorous schedule allowed no excuses. When the club became too crowded, the grounds, including the golf course, turned into a tent camp.

African-American soldiers provided much of the necessary support staff for the operations of the base, and a school was initiated to teach them aircraft engine repair and maintenance. Black soldiers were segregated in Squadron F. Their housing, meals, training, and recreation were all separate from the white soldiers in accordance with the Florida laws regarding segregation at the time.

In an administrative reorganization by HQ Army Air Force, on 1 May 1944, training units in the Zone of the Interior (ZI) (Continental United States) were re-designated as "Army Air Force Base Units". At Boca Raton, the 3501st Army Air Force Base Unit (Technical School, Radar) assumed the training school mission.

By 1944, several hundred planes were regularly transiting the airfield, being equipped with Radar. Although most were B-17 Flying Fortresses, in 1945, several B-29 Superfortresses were brought in for training procedures in radar bombing.

With the end of World War II in 1945, the radar training for both American and allied troops continued at Boca Raton but the numbers in the program constantly declined. With the rapid demobilization of the armed forces in late 1945 and 1946, a major problem facing Air Training Command was a severe shortage of instructors, as many had been separated from the military in the rush to demobilize after the war ended. The 3501st AAFBU, however, remained active and training was continued despite difficulties.

As a cost-cutting measure, War Department officials in early 1947 were making plans to dispose of the facility, the radar training program was moved to Keesler Field, Mississippi in November. This led to the inactivation of the Radar School on 5 May 1947 when the last class was graduated. However, on 18 September, a hurricane caused major damage to Boca Raton AAF and the radar school, causing over $3 million ($27 million 2010 dollars) worth of property damage. Keesler officials began airlifting personnel to the base to assist with salvage, packaging, and shipping equipment. However, before the move was completed, on 12 October a second hurricane slammed into the base, again dumping torrential rains. By the time that storm had moved on, Boca Raton Army Air Field was totally uninhabitable. Whatever could be salvaged was moved to Keesler. The resulting unsanitary conditions caused medical authorities to condemn the base, and that caused the facilities at Boca to be closed on 15 December.

On 1 January 1948, jurisdiction of Boca Raton AAF was transferred to Air Technical Service Command (ATSC), whose mission was the transfer of any useful military equipment to other bases around the country. On 1 March, it was again transferred to the Army Corps of Engineers. In December 1948, the town of Boca Raton acquired the station area of the facility from the War Assets Administration, while the 838 acres of airfield were re-designated as Boca Raton Air Force Auxiliary Field (AFAF), control of the field was assumed by the Palm Beach Air Force Base (the wartime Morrison Field).

=== Cold War use ===
Boca Raton AFAF was used by Research and Development Command used the airfield for various R&D projects, including testing of the Convair XB-46 Experimental jet bomber. In 1952, it became a secondary airfield for Palm Beach's Military Air Transport Service 1707th Air Transport Wing large transports. It was also used as part of the MATS training school at Palm Beach as an auxiliary airfield.

During the Cold War, the U.S. Government pursued the development of biological weapons for use in the event the Soviet Union initiated a biological war. The tests were part of a campaign to find a fungus powerful enough to wipe out wheat crops in the Soviet Union and starve millions of Soviet citizens in the event of a war. Boca Raton AFAF was one of many research sites scattered around the country, including Immokalee, Belle Glade, and Ft. Pierce in Florida. Boca Raton was chosen for its isolation, size, and climate.

For the testing, the U.S. Army Chemical Corps recruited enlisted men from the farm states of the Midwest. Close to a hundred men worked from a large laboratory in a Quonset hut at the north end of the test site. No one wore uniforms, and vehicles were painted black. The men planted wheat between and along the runways of the military airfield. When the wheat was about a foot high, it was sprayed with a fungus called “stem rust of rye,” which formed spores that multiplied rapidly. Every three days, the men vacuumed up the resulting millions of spores and packed them in one-to-two gallon stainless steel containers, which were driven to the Avon Park Air Force Range, near Sebring. From there they were flown to an unknown destination. In 1957 the Chemical Corps shut down the secret operation at Boca Raton and kept only a skeleton crew at the base. In 1969, the chemically-treated wheat gathered from Boca Raton and related sites was destroyed by order of President Richard Nixon. A 1994 United States Army Corps of Engineers survey found nothing harmful at the biological warfare test site in Boca Raton. U.S. Senator Bill Nelson initiated a Senate investigation of the program after the Department of Defense refused his request for information.

=== Closure ===
Air Force budget restraints in the late 1950s and local pressure to close Palm Beach Air Force Base led to the closure of the Boca Raton airfield in 1957. Subsequently, it was transferred to the General Services Administration (GSA) for disposal as excess by the end of the year.

By 1958, budget reductions caused the closure of the Boca Raton AFAF too. One year later, the military turned over the remaining property to the City of Boca Raton and the State of Florida. As part of the turnover of the facility, the Federal Government released 1,000 acres of the property in 1959 for educational use (now Florida Atlantic University) and transferred control of all the land to the State of Florida. Only 200 acres were left before the Boca Raton Airport Authority was authorized to take possession of the land.

=== Current uses ===
With the turnover of the military airfield to civil control, a new Boca Raton Airport was constructed in 1960. The former military airfield was completely torn up and removed, and new facilities were built to accommodate general aviation services. A new parking ramp and a new 04/22 NE/SW main runway and taxiway were constructed along with hangars, a terminal, and other components. The new airport does not use any of the runways, taxiways or buildings of the former Air Force facility. As of 2016, there are no scheduled flights at the Boca Raton Airport.

That said, several World War II buildings remain in use on the grounds of the Florida Atlantic University campus, built in 1961 to the east of the Boca Raton Airport on the east side of the airfield. These can be found in the area bounded by El Rio Canal on the east, Florida Atlantic Boulevard on the west, N.W. 32d Street on the north, and N.W. 28th Street on the south. In addition, the former military north-south taxiway exists north of the FAU Stadium on the campus, part of it being used as a parking lot.

Palm Beach State College's Boca Raton campus, located adjacent to FAU, uses the wartime main aircraft parking ramp as its parking lot. The wartime ramp stretches from Classroom Building B on the south end past the main Administration Building and the Humanities & Technology Building, past Boca Tech and beyond FAU Boulevard to the north. Today a myriad of cars, trucks and SUVs park on the same concrete that during World War II, B-17s and other historic aircraft occupied.

East of the drainage canal, the former radar training base is now all but unrecognizable, the landscape being a mixture of homes, retention lakes and light commercial businesses.

== See also ==
- Florida World War II Army Airfields
- Eastern Technical Training Command
