= Leesburg Army Air Field =

World War II United States Army Airfield

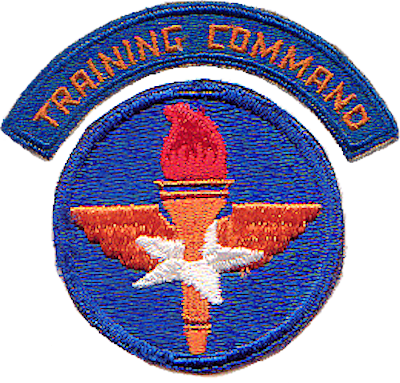
Leesburg Army Airfield
- Part of Army Air Force Training Command
- Located near: Leesburg, Florida
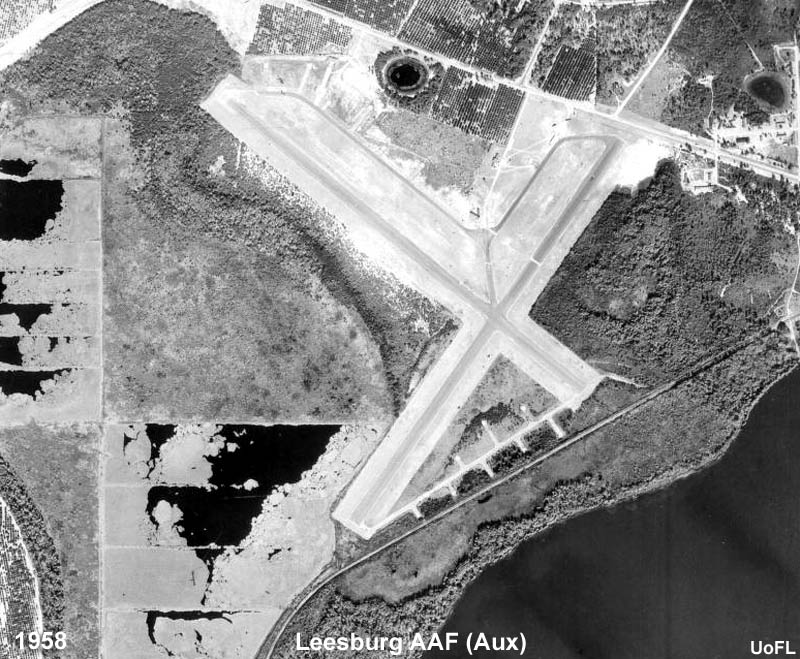
- Leesburg Army Airfield - 1958

Location
- Coordinates: 28°49′23″N 081°48′31″W

Site history
- In use: 1940-1945

Leesburg Army Airfield, was a World War II United States Army Air Forces airfield, located 4.3 miles (6.9 km) east-northeast of Leesburg, Florida.

== History ==
Construction began on the airport on November 24, 1941 as a Works Progress Administration (WPA) project. The airfield was commissioned in January 1943 as Leesburg Army Airfield (AAF). It was used as a United States Army Air Forces training airfield by the Army Air Force School of Applied Tactics at Orlando Army Air Base. Leesburg was a sub-base of Alachua AAF with the 322d Service Squadron performed third echelon maintenance and supply for the operational units assigned to the station.

The 313th Fighter Squadron was assigned to the airfield from 5 January-17 November 1943 training students with the P-40 Warhawk, with the 1158th School Squadron providing instruction in twin-engine fighter aircraft (predominantly the P-38 Lightning). Leesburg was also a repair depot with several aircraft supply and ground maintenance units. On 1 May 1944, the 910th Army Air Forces Base Unit (Fighter, Two Engine), took over the mission of the 313th Fighter Squadron, section "F" assuming the operations of the 1158th School Squadron.

== Closure ==
The airfield was closed after the end of World War II and jurisdiction of the airfield was transferred to Air Technical Service Command (ATSC), whose mission was the transfer of any useful military equipment to other bases around the country. Under ATSC, buildings and equipment were sold and any useful military equipment was transferred to other bases around the country. The base was declared as surplus in 1946 and was turned over to the War Assets Administration (WAA) for disposal and return to civil use.

The facility was subsequently turned over to the City of Leesburg.

== See also ==
- Florida World War II Army Airfields
- Army Air Force School of Applied Tactics
