= Flagler Beach Airport =

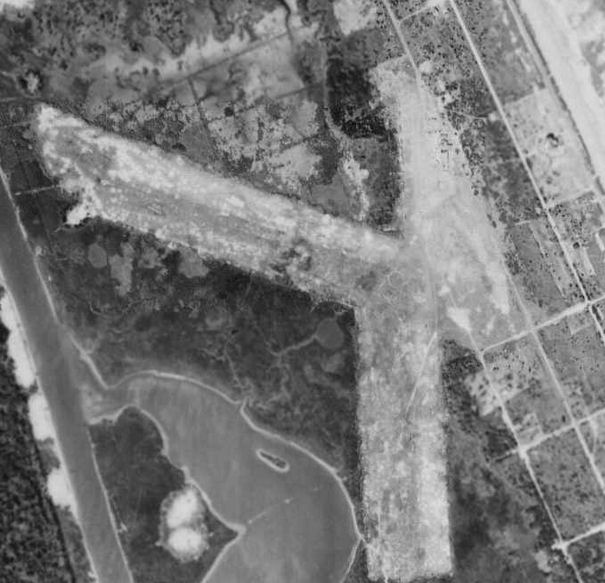
- 1943 airphoto
- IATA: none; ICAO: none

Summary
- Serves: Flagler Beach, Florida
- Coordinates: 29°28′14″N 081°07′40″W

Map
- Location of Flagler Beach Airport

Flagler Beach Airport is a closed airport. It was located just to the west of Flagler Beach, Florida, United States.

== History ==
The airport was built in the early 1930s on the narrow barrier island almost directly on the Atlantic coast. It consisted of two marl runways, 3,200' northwest/southeast and 3,000' north/south. There may have been a small hangar and a building located directly next to the beach with a parking ramp.

During World War II, the airport was initially used by the Army Air Forces Antisubmarine Command, which flew light observation planes over the Atlantic looking for Nazi U-boats. In 1943, the Navy took over the anti-submarine mission, and the Civil Air Patrol operated observation aircraft from the field.

After the war ended, the airport was closed in 1945 or 1946. It remains abandoned to this day, the land being owned by the Flagship Harbor Preserve. The outlines of the runways are clearly delineated in aerial imagery.

== See also ==
- Florida World War II Army Airfields
