= Winter Haven's Gilbert Airport =

Airport in Florida, United States

Winter Haven's Gilbert Airport Winter Haven Regional Airport
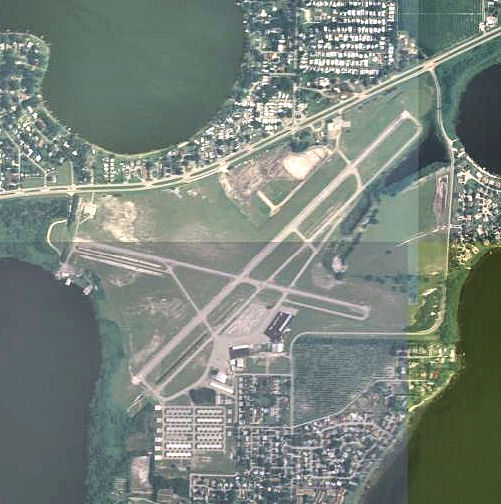
- 2006 USGS airphoto
- IATA: GIF; ICAO: KGIF; FAA LID: GIF

Summary
- Airport type: Public
- Owner: City of Winter Haven
- Serves: Winter Haven, Florida
- Elevation AMSL: 145 ft (44 m)
- Coordinates: 28°03′46″N 081°45′12″W

Map
- Location of Winter Haven's Gilbert Airport GIF (the United States)

Runways
Direction	Length		Surface
Direction	ft	m	Surface
5/23	5,005	1,526	Asphalt
11/29	4,001	1,220	Asphalt

Statistics (2018)
- Aircraft operations (year ending 7/24/2018): 77,998
- Based aircraft: 150
- Source: Federal Aviation Administration

Winter Haven's Gilbert Airport (IATA: GIF, ICAO: KGIF, FAA LID: GIF) is a city-owned, public-use airport located three nautical miles (6 km) northwest of the central business district of Winter Haven, a city in Polk County, Florida, United States. It is owned by the City of Winter Haven. It is also known as Winter Haven Regional Airport or Gilbert Field. Jack Browns Seaplane Base is located adjacent to the airport, connected by a taxiway.

No major airlines fly here, with the closest major airport being Orlando International Airport about 47 miles (76 km).

== History ==
During World War II, with the former turf runways paved by the U.S. Army Corps of Engineers, Gilbert Field became an auxiliary airfield for the Lakeland (later Lodwick) School of Aeronautics at the Lakeland Lodwick Field airport. The school provided contracted basic pilot training to United States Army Air Forces and British Royal Air Force flying cadets from the airfield. Military flight training was performed at Gilbert Field until the end of the war when the Army Air Forces inactivated the installation and returned the airfield to the City of Winter Haven for use as a civilian airport.

In 1950, concurrent with the reactivation of Bartow Air Base as a U.S. Air Force primary pilot training base, the Air Force negotiated a lease with the City of Winter Haven to use Gilbert Field under a joint civil-military arrangement as an auxiliary airfield to Bartow AB. USAF operations ceased in 1960 prior to Bartow AB's closure and transition to a civilian airport now known as Bartow Executive Airport.

== Facilities and aircraft ==
Winter Haven's Gilbert Airport covers an area of 520 acres (210 ha) at an elevation of 145 feet (44 m) above mean sea level. It has two asphalt paved runways: 5/23 is 5,005 by 100 feet (1,526 x 30 m) and 11/29 is 4,001 by 60 feet (1,220 x 18.29 m).

For the 12-month period ending July 24, 2018, the airport had 77,998 general aviation aircraft operations, an average of 214 per day. At that time there were 150 aircraft based at this airport: 138 single-engine, 10 multi-engine, 2 helicopters, and 1 glider.

== Accidents and incidents ==
Four people were killed on March 7, 2023, when a Piper PA-28 Cherokee and a float-equipped Piper J-3 Cub collided on approach to runway 29 at Gilbert Field.

== See also ==
- Florida World War II Army Airfields
- List of airports in Florida
