= Baldsiefen Field =

United States air field

Baldsiefen Field Eglin Air Force Base Auxiliary Field #8
- Part of Eglin Air Force Base
- Located near: Valparaiso, Florida
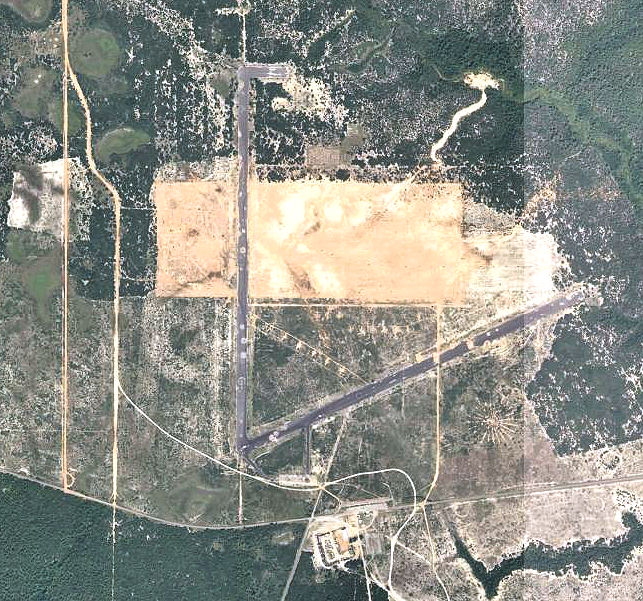
- 2006 USGS airphoto

Site information
- Controlled by: United States Air Force; Eglin Air Force Base

Location
- Coordinates: 30°32′12″N 086°19′27″W

Site history
- Built: 1940
- In use: 1941-present
- Battles/wars: World War II

Baldsiefen Field, (Formerly: Eglin Air Force Auxiliary Field #8), is a closed United States Air Force field. It is located 10.2 miles east of Valparaiso, Florida.

== Overview ==
Auxiliary Field 8 is named Baldsiefen Field for 2nd Lt. Richard Edward Baldsiefen, a gunnery instructor at Eglin, killed 4 March 1942 along with Lt. John W. Smith, in the crash of AT-6A-NA Texan, 41-528, which came down at Auxiliary Field 4. It is designated Site C-52C.

== History ==
With the onset of World War II, the Eglin Field military reservation was greatly expanded when the Choctawhatchee National Forest was turned over to the War Department by the U.S. Forestry Service on 18 October 1940, and a series of auxiliary airfields were constructed from January 1941. The history of the Field is largely unknown, although the runways are pockmarked with craters and patches. Those are likely from either bombs or explosive charges being detonated, with civil engineering rapid runway repair teams using them for training.

=== Current status ===
The airfield was incorporated into Eglin AFB on 9 October 1959 and was inactivated. However, the airfield remains under the jurisdiction of the 96th Air Base Wing (96 ABW) as part of the active Eglin base and is not accessible to the public. Baldsiefen is located in an area of the Eglin base called Range 52. It is currently used for training involving rough field landings & takeoffs, cargo extractions, air assault landings & parachute drops.

It appears to be used as part of the Eglin target range, as aircraft airframes are visible from time to time on the ramp, likely used for ground targets. Current (2012) imagery shows two F-15s, two F-4s, an A-4, and a propeller-driven aircraft on the ramp, with one F-15 sitting out between the runways.

There also appears to be a vehicle R&M yard south of the airfield, along with a radio relay facility which is staffed by Eglin personnel.

== See also ==
- Florida World War II Army Airfields
