= Peel Field =

United States Air Force field

Peel Field Eglin Air Force Base Auxiliary Field #4
- Part of Eglin Air Force Base
- Located near: Valparaiso, Florida
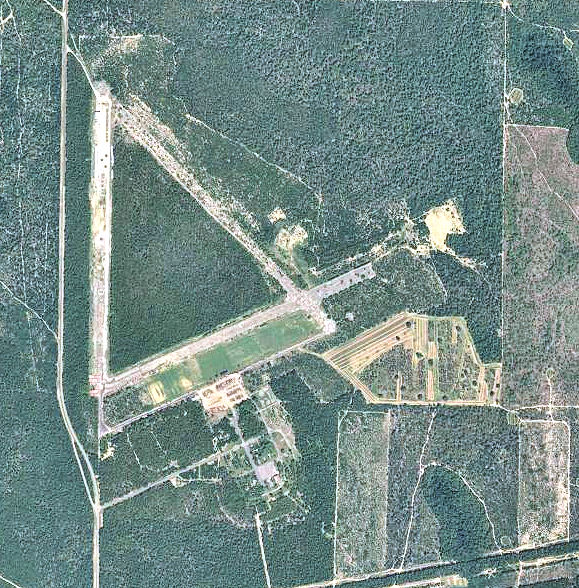
- 2006 USGS airphoto

Site information
- Controlled by: United States Air Force; Eglin Air Force Base

Location
- Coordinates: 30°30′36″N 086°35′23″W

Site history
- Built: 1940
- In use: 1941-1959
- Battles/wars: World War II

Peel Field, (Formerly: Eglin Air Force Auxiliary Field #4), is a closed United States Air Force field. It is located 5.7 miles west of Valparaiso, Florida.

== Overview ==
Auxiliary Field 4 is named Peel Field for 2nd Lt Garland O. Peel, Jr.,, USAAF, who died in the take-off crash of Martin B-12AM, AAF Ser. No. 33-262, of the 387th School Squadron, 2 January 1942, when he suffered engine failure. He was a gunnery school instructor at Eglin. Peel Field was utilized for the filming of scenes for the 1944 film Thirty Seconds Over Tokyo.

== History ==
With the onset of World War II, the Eglin Field military reservation was greatly expanded when the Choctawhatchee National Forest was turned over to the War Department by the U.S. Forestry Service on 18 October 1940, and a series of auxiliary airfields were constructed from January 1941 onwards.

The history of Peel Field is largely unknown, and the exact date of construction is undetermined. World War II wartime temporary housing for NCOs located here was razed in the 1960s. In the early 1960s, while in a moribund state, one of the runways was used as an unofficial auto drag strip by local civilians.

=== Current status ===
The airfield was incorporated into Eglin AFB on 9 October 1959 and was inactivated. However, the airfield remains under the jurisdiction of the 96th Test Wing (96 TW) as part of the active Eglin base and is not accessible to the public. The ramp of the non-flight-rated facility now serves as a vehicle park for aircraft and armored vehicles before and after being expended as targets on the Eglin ranges. The Eglin AFB Aero Modelers flying club uses the south end of the north–south (18/36) runway for radio-controlled flying on weekends.

== See also ==
- Florida World War II Army Airfields
