= Piccolo Field =

Piccolo Field Eglin Air Force Base Auxiliary Field #5
- Part of Eglin Air Force Base
- Located near: Valparaiso, Florida
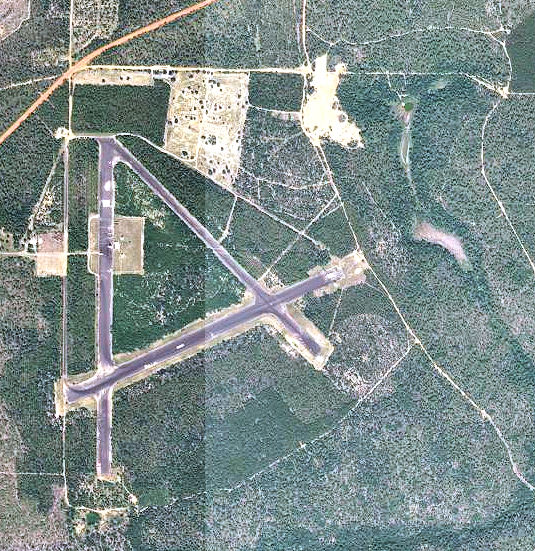
- 2006 USGS airphoto

Site information
- Controlled by: United States Air Force; Eglin Air Force Base

Location
- Coordinates: 30°35′21″N 086°37′17″W

Site history
- Built: 1940
- In use: 1941-present
- Battles/wars: World War II

Piccolo Field, (Formerly: Eglin Air Force Auxiliary Field #5), is a closed United States Air Force field. It is located 9.3 miles northwest of Valparaiso, Florida.

== Overview ==
Auxiliary Field 5 is named Piccolo Field for Capt. Anthony D. Piccolo, who died in the crash of AT-6A-NT Texan, 41-16372, on 6 October 1942. Piccolo was the commanding officer of the 386th Single Engine Gunnery Training Squadron at Eglin.

== History ==
With the onset of World War II, the Eglin Field military reservation was greatly expanded when the Choctawhatchee National Forest was turned over to the War Department by the U.S. Forestry Service on 18 October 1940, and a series of auxiliary airfields were constructed from January 1941. The history of Piccolo Field is largely unknown, however in March 1942, the airfield was utilized for training by the Doolittle Raiders in preparation for their raid on Japan.

The airfield was apparently used during the late 1950s and early 1960s as part of the CIM-10 Bomarc program. Just north of the airfield are approximately 40 BOMARC Launch shelters, along with several support buildings, large lighting poles and the remains of a security fence (30°35′37″N 086°37′18″W). It is unknown if any missiles were located at the facility. It was likely abandoned in the early 1960s when BOMARC funding was ended.

=== Current status ===
The airfield was incorporated into Eglin AFB on 9 October 1959 and was inactivated. However, the airfield remains under the jurisdiction of the 96th Air Base Wing (96 ABW) as part of the active Eglin base and is not accessible to the public. Today, it serves as a microwave station. A 60-foot radar antenna and some support buildings was installed on the north-south (36/18) runway in April 1961. A secondary site is located on the northeast end of the 05/23 runway. On most base maps, it is identified as Site C-4. A secure storage area is also located on the site.

== See also ==
- Florida World War II Army Airfields
