= Montbrook Army Airfield =

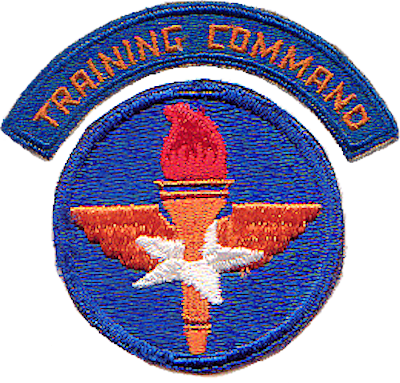
Montbrook Army Airfield
- Part of Army Air Force Training Command
- Located near: Williston, Florida
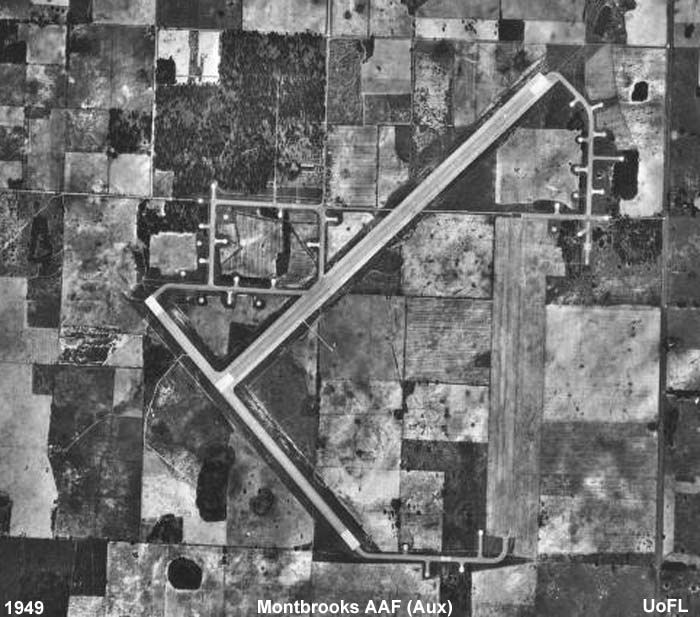
- Montbrook Army Air Field - 1949

Location
- Coordinates: 29°21′21″N 082°28′18″W

Site history
- In use: 1940-1945

Montbrook Army Air Field, was a World War II United States Army Air Forces airfield, located 2.4 miles (3.9 km) south-southwest of Williston, Florida.

== History ==
During World War II, the airfield was opened as a US Army Air Forces installation on 1 January 1942. Montbrook was a sub-base of the Army Air Force School of Applied Tactics Alachua Army Air Field. The airfield was very small with only a few personnel assigned. It was under the operational control of the AAFSAT 415th Bombardment Group Medium Bombardment training unit at Alachua AAF.

Known units assigned at Montbrook AAF were:

- 99th Bombardment Squadron, 5 February-14 November 1943 (B-25 Mitchell), (Martin B-26 Marauder)
- 465th Bombardment Squadron, 19 November 1943 – 2 March 1944 (DB-7, Douglas A-20 Havoc)

On 20 May 1944, the airfield was put on standby status and placed under the control of the 4318th Army Air Force Base Unit (Base Maintenance). It appears to have been closed by the end of 1944 with jurisdiction of the airfield being transferred to Air Technical Service Command (ATSC), whose mission was the transfer of any useful military equipment to other bases around the country. Under ATSC, buildings and equipment were sold and any useful military equipment was transferred to other bases around the country. The base was declared as surplus and was turned over to the War Assets Administration (WAA) for disposal and return to civil use.

== See also ==
- Florida World War II Army Airfields
- Army Air Force School of Applied Tactics
