= Isla San José Airport =

San José Airport
- IATA: SIC; ICAO: none

Summary
- Serves: San José Island
- Location: Panamá Province
- Elevation AMSL: 130 ft (40 m)
- Coordinates: 8°15′45″N 79°04′40″W

Map
- Location of the airport in Panama

Runways
Direction	Length		Surface
Direction	m	ft	Surface
13/31	1,330	4,364	Concrete
- Source: HERE Maps GCM

San José Airport (IATA: SIC) is an airport serving the island of San José, in the Pearl Islands archipelago of Panama.

The east approach and departure are over water and an overrun on the east end terminates with a steep drop into the ocean.

The Taboga Island VOR-DME (Ident: TBG) is located 42.8 nautical miles (79 km) northwest of the airport.

== See also ==
- Transport in Panama
- List of airports in Panama
