= Pomona Landing Airport =

Airport in Florida, U.S.

- IATA: none; ICAO: none

Summary
- Serves: Pomona Park, Florida
- Coordinates: 29°30′06″N 081°34′39″W

Map
- Location of Pomona Landing Airport

Pomona Landing Airport (FAA LID: 78FL) is a turf airstrip located 1 mile east of Pomona Park, Florida.

== History ==
Reopened in December 1999, the airstrip is the location of a former World War II Army Air Forces emergency landing field. It was closed after the war and abandoned.

== See also ==
- Florida World War II Army Airfields
