= Bushnell Army Airfield =

Former WW II airfield in Florida, USA

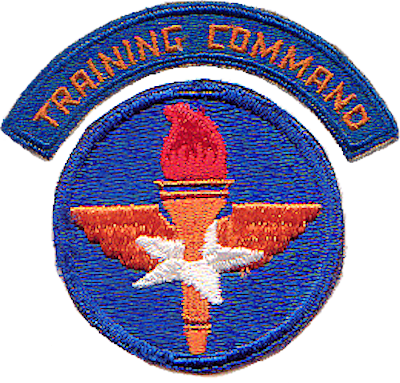
Bushnell Army Airfield
- Part of Army Air Force Training Command
- Sumter County, near Bushnell, Florida
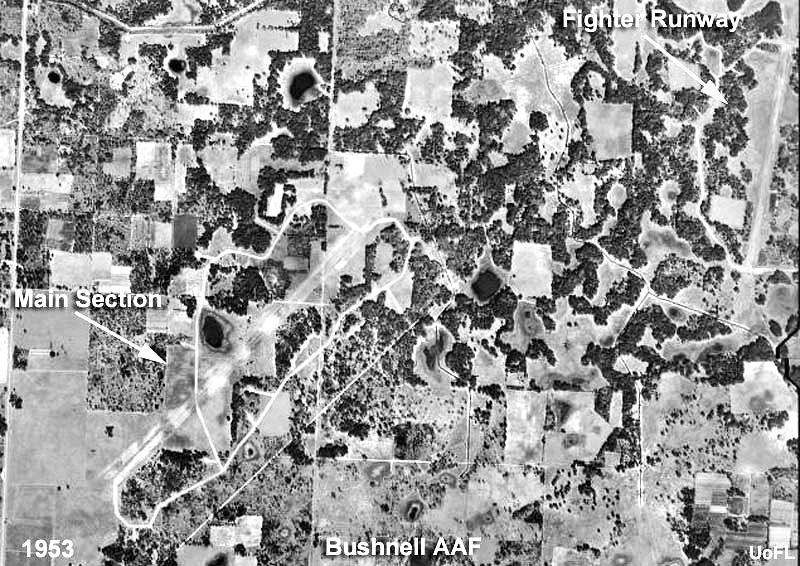
- 1953 aerial photo

Site information
- Type: Army Airfield
- Controlled by: United States Army Air Forces

Location
- Location within Florida
- Coordinates: Bomber airstrip: 28°40′57″N 082°05′24″W; Fighter Airstrip: 28°41′30″N 082°03′51″W

Site history
- Built: 1941-42
- In use: 1942-1945

Garrison information
- Garrison: Army Air Force Training Command

Bushnell Army Airfield is a former World War II United States Army Air Forces airfield located northeast of the intersection of Route 301 & Walker Avenue, one mile northeast of the town of Bushnell, Florida.

== History ==
The airfield was acquired by lease from various owners beginning in 1940, and was constructed by the 841st Aviation Engineers Battalion in 1943. It was initially called a "T/O training field, supporting the main base of the Army Air Force School of Applied Tactics at Orlando Army Air Base.

Bushnell had a 6,000-foot hard-surface runway and a 4,000-foot NNE/SSW steel plank landing mat runway but had no radio facilities, no gasoline, and no hangars. The 6,000-foot runway was known as the "bomber runway", while the 4,000-foot strip was known as the "fighter runway". An aircraft parking area was apparently located at the southwest end of the bomber runway.

Bushnell was used extensively in Chemical warfare trials. In 1943 the Dugway Proving Ground Mobile Chemical Warfare Service Unit arrived at Bushnell AAF to begin experiments on non-persistent chemical agents, setting up the Chemical Warfare Service Experimental Station. The airfield was used by the Dugway Proving Ground Mobile CWS Unit as a landing strip for the planes used in the field trials at Withlacoochee Bombing & Gunnery Range. Bushnell was also used by Boeing B-17s from Brooksville AAF, B-25 Mitchells from Montbrook AAF, Republic P-47 Thunderbolts from Cross City AAF, Lockheed P-38 Lightnings from Lakeland AAF, and Martin B-26 Marauders from Drew Field near Tampa.

=== Closure ===
It was classed as a temporary field on standby basis in 1944, and was closed in 1945. Jurisdiction of the airfield was transferred to Air Technical Service Command (ATSC), whose mission was the transfer of any useful military equipment to other bases around the country. Under ATSC, the 20,000 steel mats which had made up the two runways at Bushnell were sold for scrap, but many found new life as miles of fences scattered across west-central Florida. The Bushnell AAF property was certified to the War Assets Administration (WAA) for disposal in 1946.

The lands reverted to the owners & most land was put back into agricultural use, and was never reused as a civilian airfield. The chemical warfare activities conducted at Bushnell in World War II have caused it to be the site of environmental cleanup investigations in 2001.

Today the areas of the two former airfields are still largely undeveloped, with some houses scattered around the area. The outline of the former fighter & bomber runways are still barely apparent in aerial photos. There does not appear to be any remains of any airfield buildings.

=== Environmental studies ===
In 1988, a property owner suffered chemical burns on his legs while digging a water well. Suspecting mustard gas, the Florida Department of Environmental Regulation and the United States Army began an investigation into the source of the contamination. Officials found aviation fuel that had been used for an experimental pump for bombers in the groundwater. In 1988, interested builders had to sign an affidavit affirming their knowledge of contaminated ground water.

== See also ==
- Florida World War II Army Airfields
- Army Air Force School of Applied Tactics
