= Avon Park Air Force Range =

Bombing range in Florida, United States

- Near Avon Park, Florida in the United States

Site information
- Type: US Air Force Range
- Owner: Department of Defense
- Operator: US Air Force
- Controlled by: Air Combat Command (ACC)
- Condition: Operational
- Other site facilities: MacDill Air Force Base Auxiliary Field
- Website: https://avon.isportsman.net/

Location
- Coordinates: 27.64°N 81.26°W
- Area: 352sq mi

Site history
- Built: 1942 (as Avon Park General Bombing and Gunnery Range, Avon Park)
- In use: 1942–Present

Garrison information
- Garrison: 598th Range Squadron

Avon Park Air Force Range (APAFR) is an active United States Air Force installation located 10.5 miles (16.8 km) east of Avon Park, Florida.

Avon park Air Force Range was constructed in March of 1942 as Avon Park General Bombing and Gunnery Range.

== Previous names ==
- Avon Park General Bombing and Gunnery Range, March 1942
- Avon Park Army Airfield, November 1943
- Avon Park Air Force Range, September 1945

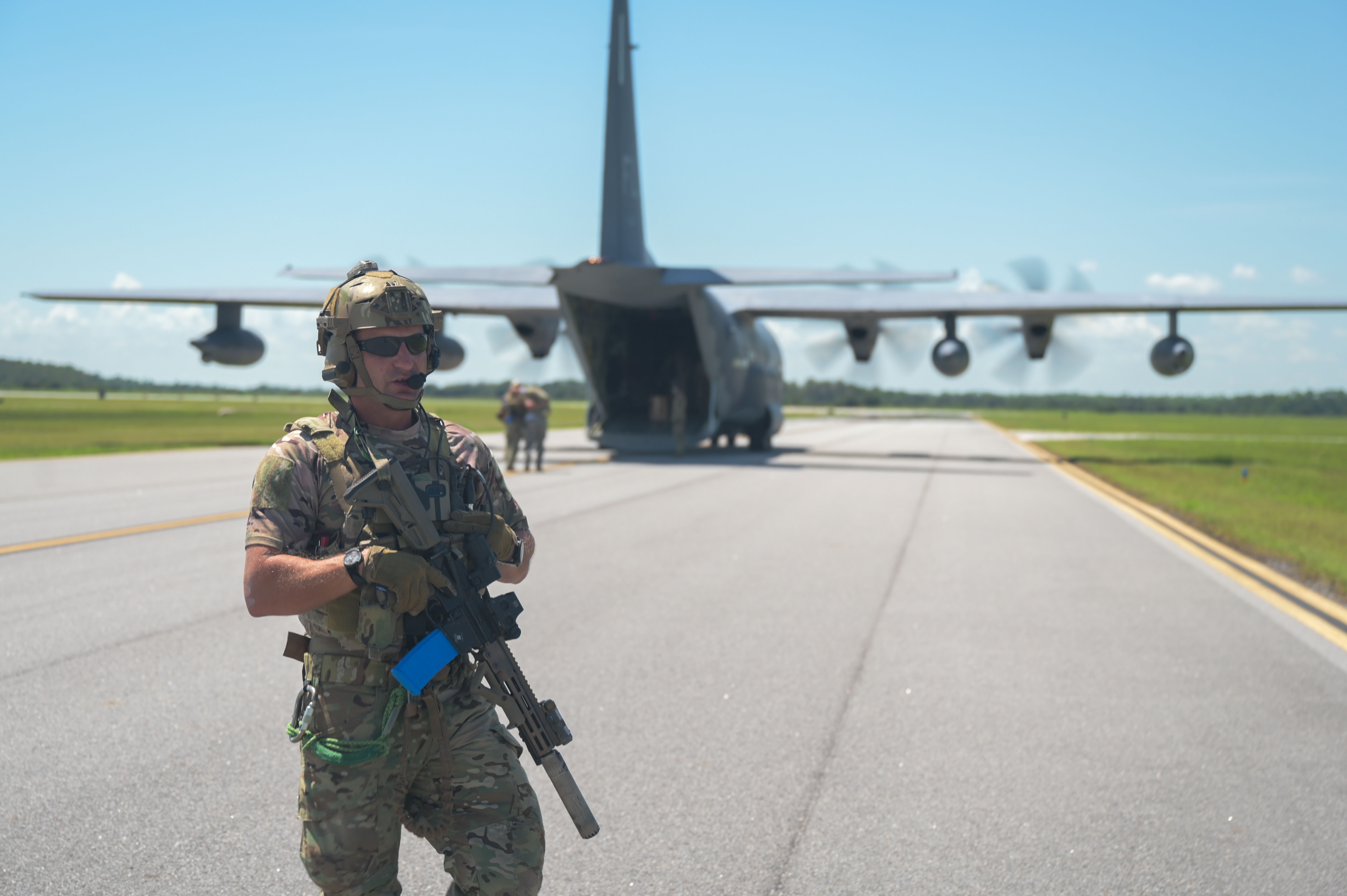
A 920th Rescue Wing pararescueman defends a HC-130J Combat King ll aircraft during exercise Fury Horizon 23 at Avon Park Air Force Range, Florida, Sept. 9, 2023.

== Role and operations ==
Avon Park General Bombing and Gunnery Range was used to train the crews of B-17 Flying Fortress and B-26 Marauders on a range of simulated target opportunities.

Avon Park Air Force Range now serves as a bombing range for the United States Air Force. Exercises are also hosted at Avon Park Air Force Range such as exercises Dragon Strike 15, and Fury Horizon 23.

=== Base operating units ===
598th Range Squadron, 22 September 2015 – Present

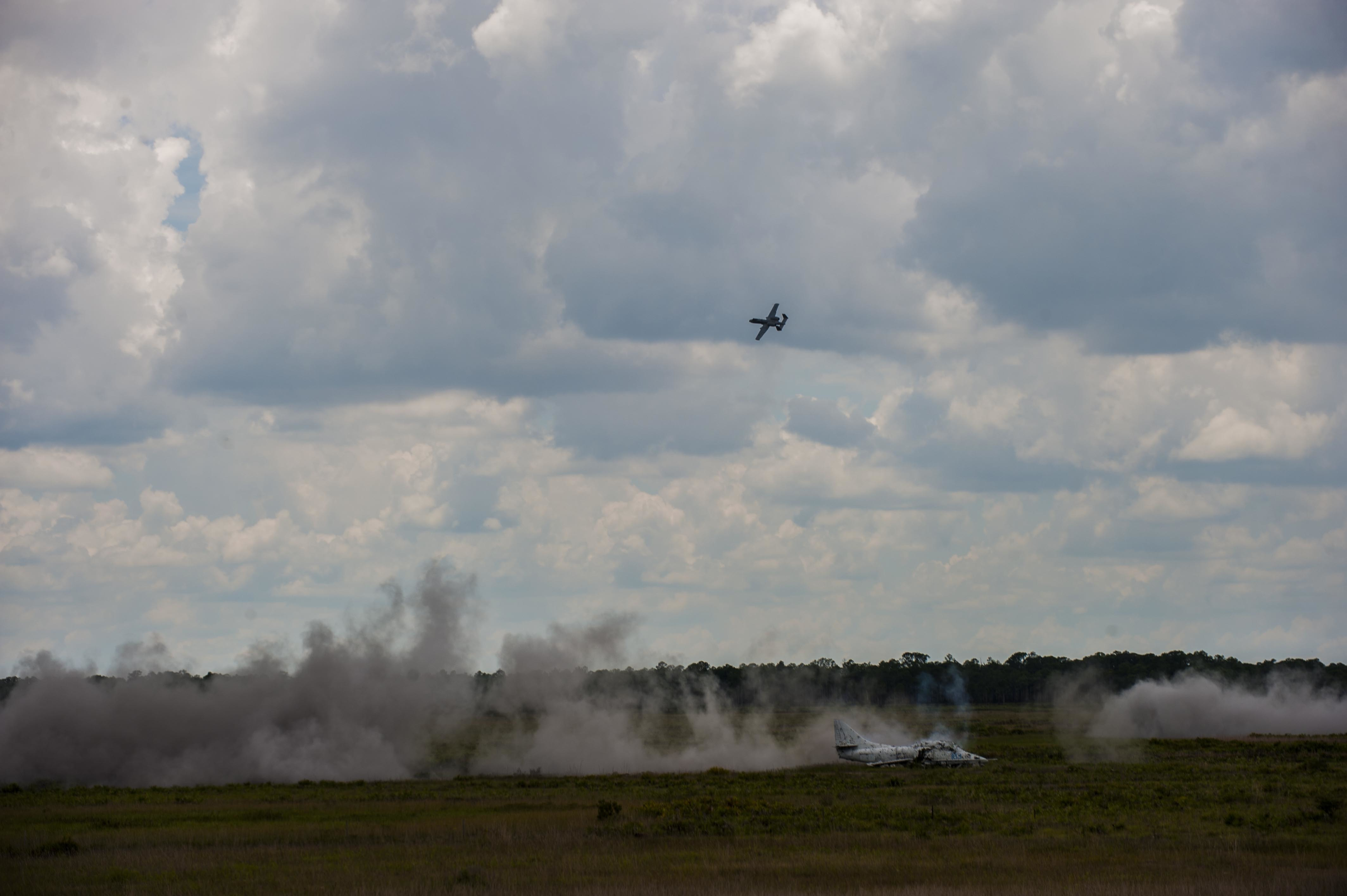
An A-10C Thunderbolt II performs a strafe run after target confirmation from Joint Terminal Attack Controllers (JTACs) during Exercise Dragon Strike June 9, 2015, at Avon Park Air Force Range, Florida.

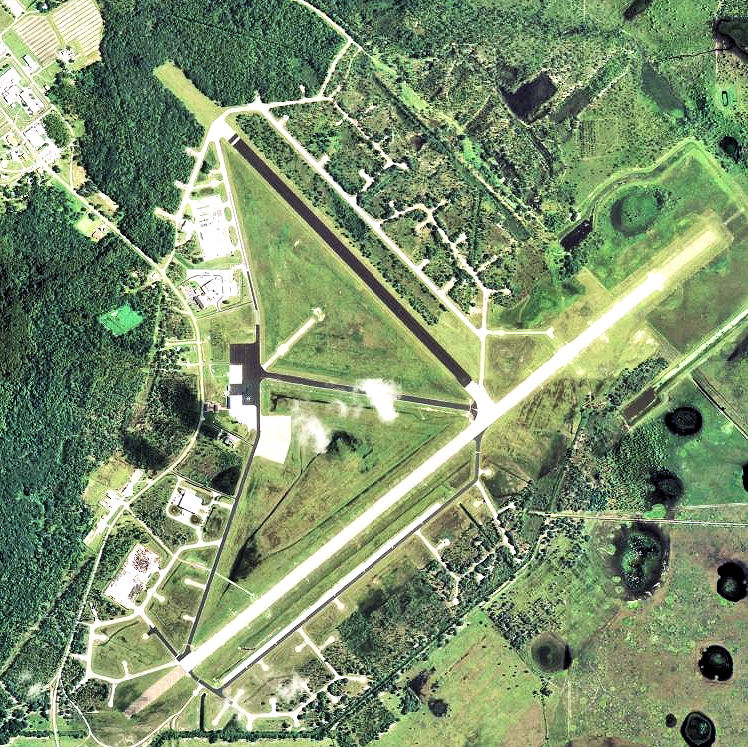
MacDill AFB Auxiliary Field located at Avon Park Air Force Range, Florida.

== Facilities ==
=== MacDill AFB Auxiliary Field ===
MacDill AFB Auxiliary Field has a 8000 x 150 feet (2438 x 46 meter) runway designated 05/23 consisting of asphalt. It is located 8 miles northeast of Avon Park, Florida

== See also ==
- MacDill Air Force Base
- Florida World War II Army Airfields
