= Avon Park Executive Airport =

Airport in Highland County, Florida

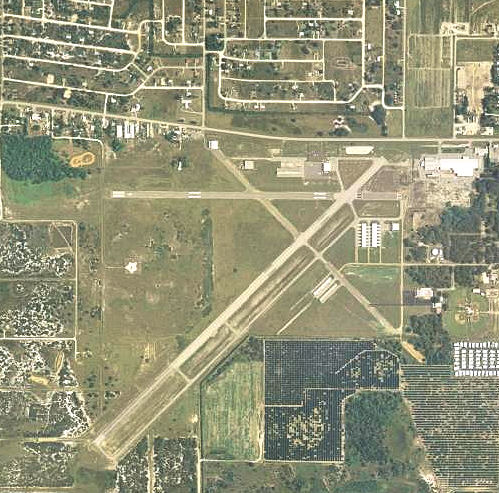
- 2006 USGS airphoto
- IATA: AVO; ICAO: KAVO; FAA LID: AVO

Summary
- Airport type: Public
- Owner: City of Avon Park
- Serves: Avon Park, Florida
- Elevation AMSL: 160 ft (49 m)
- Coordinates: 27°35′29″N 81°31′44″W
- Website: www.avonpark.city/..

Map
- Location of airport in Florida AVO (the United States)

Runways
Direction	Length		Surface
Direction	ft	m	Surface
5/23	5,374	1,638	Asphalt
10/28	3,844	1,172	Asphalt

Statistics (2008)
- Aircraft operations: 32,400
- Based aircraft: 48
- Source: Federal Aviation Administration

Avon Park Executive Airport (IATA: AVO, ICAO: KAVO, FAA LID: AVO) is a city-owned, public-use airport located two nautical miles (3.7 km) west of the central business district of Avon Park, a city in Highlands County, Florida, United States.

== Overview ==
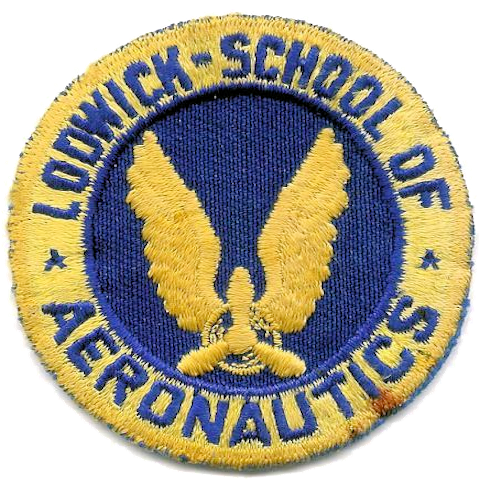
Emblem of the 61st Army Air Force Fight Training Detachment (Contract Flying)

According to the FAA's National Plan of Integrated Airport Systems for 2009–2013, it is categorized as a general aviation airport.

== Facilities and aircraft ==
Avon Park Executive Airport covers an area of 321 acres (130 ha) at an elevation of 160 feet (49 m) above mean sea level. It has two asphalt paved runways: 5/23 is 5,374 by 100 feet (1,638 x 30 m) and 10/28 is 3,844 by 75 feet (1,172 x 23 m).

For the 12-month period ending July 31, 2008, the airport had 32,400 general aviation aircraft operations, an average of 88 per day. At that time there were 48 aircraft based at this airport: 83% single-engine, 13% multi-engine, 2% jet and 2% helicopter.

== History ==
The Avon Park Executive Airport opened as a civil airport in April 1940. The facility was then known as Avon Park Municipal Airport. During World War II the airport was leased by the United States Army Air Forces who used it as a contract pilot training airfield. During this period it was placed under the jurisdiction of the 61st Army Air Force Fight Training Detachment as a primary pilot training airfield and should not be confused with the larger as Avon Park Army Airfield, a Martin B-26 Marauder and Boeing B-17 Flying Fortress advanced bomber crew training base located 10.7 miles east-northeast of the city of Avon Park.

Operated by the Lodwick Aviation Military Academy, Avon Park MAP was used as a primary (level 1) pilot training airfield. Flying training was performed with Fairchild PT-19s as the primary trainer. Also had several PT-17 Stearmans assigned. The airfield had three 4'000 hard surfaced for landings and takeoffs. In addition, Avon Park MAP had four auxiliary airfields for emergency and overflow landings:

- Avon Park Auxiliary Field #1 27°36′31″N 81°36′07″W
- Avon Park Auxiliary Field #2 27°39′59″N 81°35′09″W
- Avon Park Auxiliary Field #3 27°41′16″N 81°39′03″W
- Avon Park Auxiliary Field #4 27°43′47″N 81°43′26″W

All of the Auxiliary airfields were grass all-way runways and not overseen by airport personnel. After the war they were returned to their owners and today are indistinguishable from the surrounding landscape.

=== Closure ===
Training Command inactivated the military flying school on 16 October 1944 as part of the drawdown of AAFTC's pilot training program. Declared surplus and turned over to the Army Corps of Engineers on 30 September 1945. Eventually discharged to the War Assets Administration and returned to previous status as a civil airport.

== See also ==
- Florida World War II Army Airfields
- List of airports in Florida
- 29th Flying Training Wing (World War II)
