= Lake Wales Municipal Airport =

Lake Wales Municipal Airport Lake Wales Army Airfield
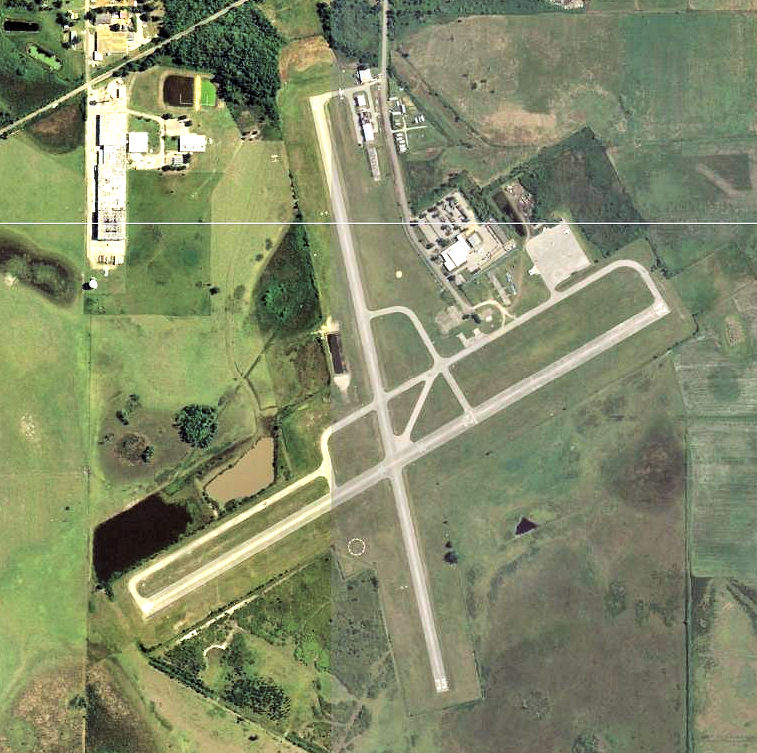
- 2006 USGS airphoto
- IATA: none; ICAO: none; FAA LID: X07

Summary
- Airport type: Public use
- Owner: City of Lake Wales
- Operator: Lake Wales Airport Authority
- Serves: Lake Wales, Florida
- Location: Lake Wales, Florida
- Elevation AMSL: 127 ft / 39 m
- Coordinates: 27°53′37″N 081°37′13″W

Map
- Location of Lake Wales Municipal Airport X07 (the United States)

Runways
Direction	Length		Surface
Direction	ft	m	Surface
06/24	5,400	1,646	Asphalt
17/35	3,860	1,177	Asphalt

Statistics (2018)
- Aircraft operations (year ending 7/25/2018): 20,000
- Based aircraft: 18
- Source: Federal Aviation Administration

Lake Wales Municipal Airport (FAA LID: X07) is a public-use airport located 2 miles (3.2 km) west of the central business district of the city of Lake Wales in Polk County, Florida, United States. The airport is publicly owned.

== Overview ==
The airport's service area includes the cities of Lake Wales, Dundee, Eagle Lake, Fort Meade, Frostproof, Highland Park, Hillcrest Heights, and Lake Hamilton. Typical operations conducted at the airport are local and transient general aviation, flight training, localized recreational glider activity, and skydiving. Presently there are no air carrier, commuter or air taxi operations conducted at the airport.

The airport's current role and classification are listed in the FAA's National Plan of Integrated Airport System (NPIAS) as a General Utility General Aviation Airport capable of accommodating virtually all general aviation aircraft with maximum gross takeoff weights of 12,500 pounds or less with wingspans up to, but not including, 79 feet.

In 2021, the airport started expansion plans to lengthen and resurface runways and taxiways to accommodate for the new traffic demands. This expansion allowed for new operations such as Fun Flight Training, an airplane school, and Rotor School, a helicopter flight training provider.

== History ==
Opened in 1928 as a civil airport, in 1943 the airport was leased by the United States Army Air Forces as an auxiliary airfield of Sarasota Army Airfield. III Fighter Command used Lake Wales Army Airfield for fighter training of replacement personnel. The Army improved the facility which included the construction of the two present 4,000-foot runways. No permanent units were assigned. It was inactivated in 1945 and returned to civil control.

After 1945 the operations served the local community; most of the operators were ranchers and individuals who lived in Lake Wales & the surrounding cities.

On November 1, 1946 Curtis Dee Ammons of Lake Wales, FL flew solo for the first time at the airport on his 16th birthday; the Daily Highlander, newspaper covered the news and it marked the beginning of Ammons relationship with the airport.

On October 1, 2008, the main terminal (FBO) was named after Curtis Dee Ammons for his contributions to the aviation community in Lake Wales, and the greater Central Florida.

== See also ==
- Florida World War II Army Airfields
- List of airports in Florida
