= Airglades Airport =

Airport in Hendry County, Florida

Airglades Airport Riddle Field
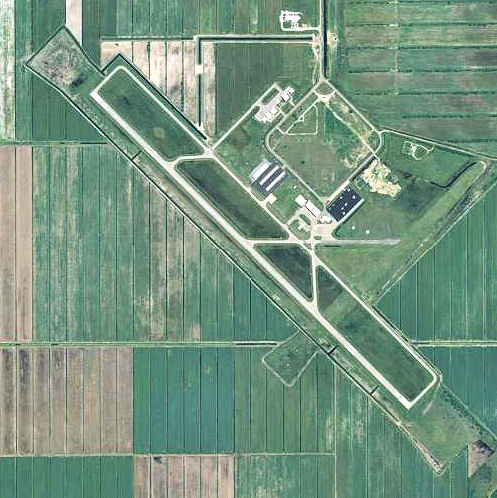
- 2006 USGS airphoto

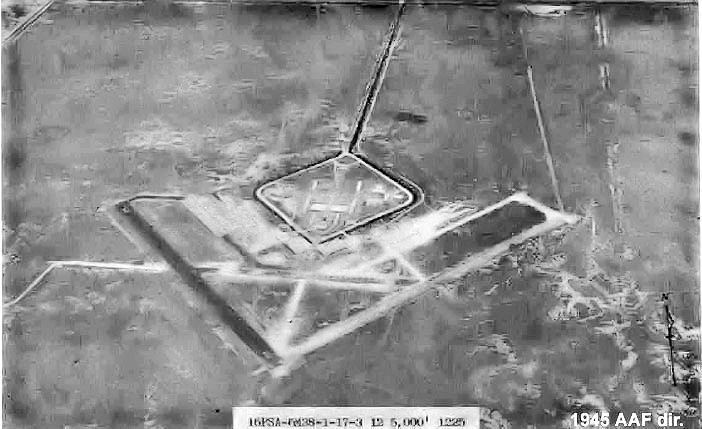
- 1943 image of Riddle Field
- IATA: none; ICAO: none; FAA LID: 2IS

Summary
- Airport type: Public use
- Owner: Hendry County
- Serves: Clewiston, Florida
- Elevation AMSL: 20 ft (6.1 m)
- Coordinates: 26°44′06″N 81°03′04″W

Map
- Location of Airglades Airport 2IS (the United States)

Runways
Direction	Length		Surface
Direction	ft	m	Surface
13/31	5,950	1,814	Asphalt

Statistics (2002)
- Aircraft operations: 11,532
- Based aircraft: 21
- Source: Federal Aviation Administration

Airglades Airport (FAA LID: 2IS) is a county-owned public-use airport in Hendry County, Florida, United States. It is located 5 miles (8 km) west of the central business district of Clewiston, Florida.

== Overview ==
The airport has a lighted runway that is 5,950 feet (1,810 m) long, fuel facilities, and repair facilities.

== History ==
In 1941, British Prime Minister Winston Churchill made an urgent appeal to the United States to provide war materials and pilot training for defense against a superior German air power which bombarded England during the Battle of Britain. President Franklin Roosevelt responded by implementing the Lend Lease Act, which called for the construction of six British Flying Training Schools in California, Arizona, Oklahoma, Texas and the British Flying Training School (BFTS) #5 at Riddle Field near the town of Clewiston, Florida, which trained more than 1,700 cadets in the Royal Air Force.

The airfield was opened on 12 November 1942 by the United States Army Air Forces. Assigned to USAAF Southeast Training Center (later Southeast Flying Training Command). It conducted contract basic flying training by Riddle-McKay Aero College (which was at the time one of six divisions of the Embry-Riddle School of Aviation), under the jurisdiction of the 75th Flying Training Detachment (Contract Pilot School)

Daily life at Riddle Field consisted of Primary flight training in the Stearman PT-17, Basic flying training in the Vultee BT-13, through to completion of the Advanced flying course in the Harvard AT-6. The cadets also received extensive training in formation flying, acrobatic maneuvers, armaments and instrument navigation. More than 1,300 cadets earned their wings at Riddle Field and returned to England to face their two greatest enemies, the Nazis, and the weather.

Local volunteers established a Cadet Club in what was known as the Pioneer Building (on Ponce deLeon Street behind present day U.S. Sugar Corp.) where dances and games were provided. The Clewiston Inn also served as a meeting place for officers and cadets to socialize.

Inactivated 31 December 1945 with the drawdown of AAFTC's pilot training program and was declared surplus in 1946. Responsibility for it was given to the War Assets Administration (WAA) and the facility was eventually acquired by Hendry County.

The present-day Airglades Airport was built after the war over the runways of Riddle Field. The buildings of the wartime field have been replaced by modern buildings, however the airfield is partially still in use. The No. 5 BFTS Association of former students continue their contact with the Clewiston community through periodic visits.

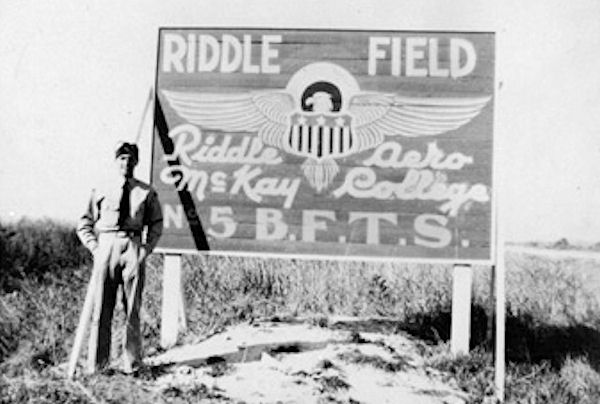
Flying cadet at airfield sign

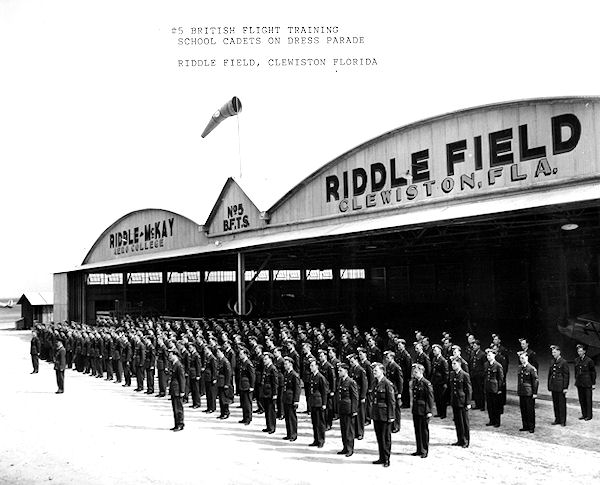
RAF Cadets on Parade

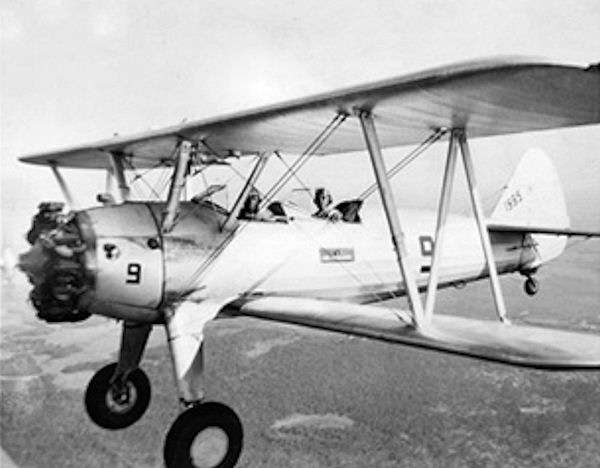
Cadet training in PT-17 Stearman

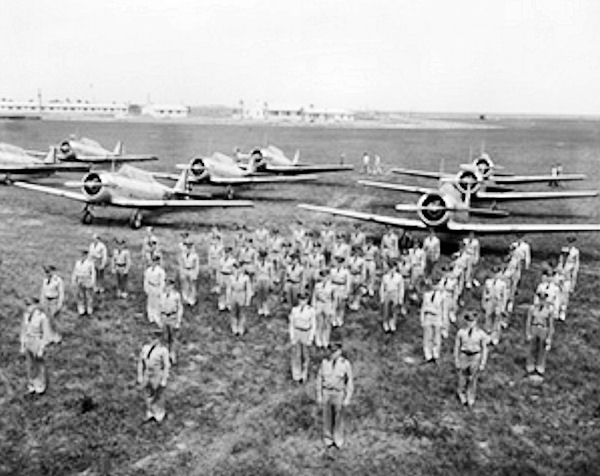
Cadets with AT-6 Texans

== See also ==
- Florida World War II Army Airfields
- List of airports in Florida
- 28th Flying Training Wing (World War II)
