= Withlacoochee Army Airfield =

- Located near: Lacoochee, Florida
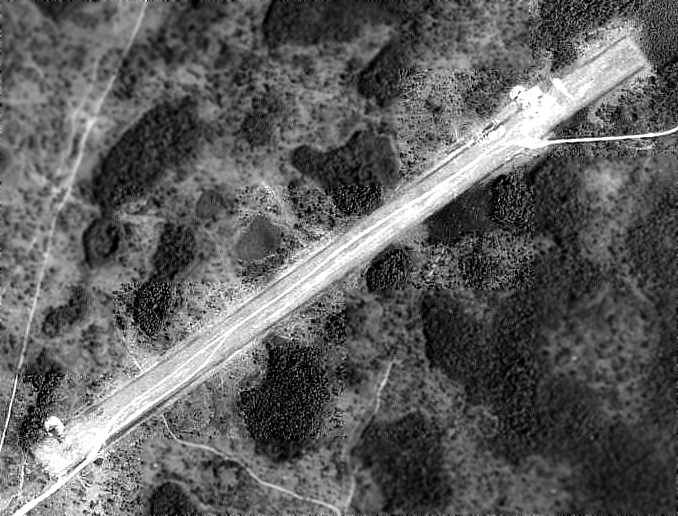
- 1951 aerial photo

Location
- Coordinates: 28°29′17″N 082°02′25″W

Site history
- In use: 1940-1945

Withlacoochee Army Airfield and Withlacoochee Bombing & Gunnery Range, was a World War II United States Army Air Forces airfield, located 8.2 miles (13.2 km) east of Lacoochee, Florida. The airfield closed in 1945 and is now abandoned.

== History ==
The airfield was built circa 1942 as part of the Army Airfields in the Orlando area, as an auxiliary to the Bushnell Army Airfield and Zephyrhills Army Airfield. Its primary mission was to support Chemical Weapons testing in the Bushnell area and as an emergency airfield for the Army Air Force School of Applied Tactics fighter training school at Orlando Army Air Base.

In 1943 the Dugway Proving Ground, Utah, Mobile Chemical Warfare Service (CWS) Unit arrived at Bushnell AAF to begin experiments on both persistent and non-persistent chemical agents, setting up the Chemical Warfare Service Experimental Station. The Withlacoochee airfield was used by the CWS Unit as a landing strip for the planes used in the field trials at Withlacoochee Bombing & Gunnery Range. Several military herbicides for defoliation and crop destruction were tested at the airfield.

After World War II ended, the airstrip was abandoned and apparently has not been used ever since. Withlachoochee AAF has been the subject of several cleanup efforts to remove remnants of chemical weapons previously tested there, under the U.S. Army Corps of Engineers Formerly Used Defense Sites (FUDS) program.

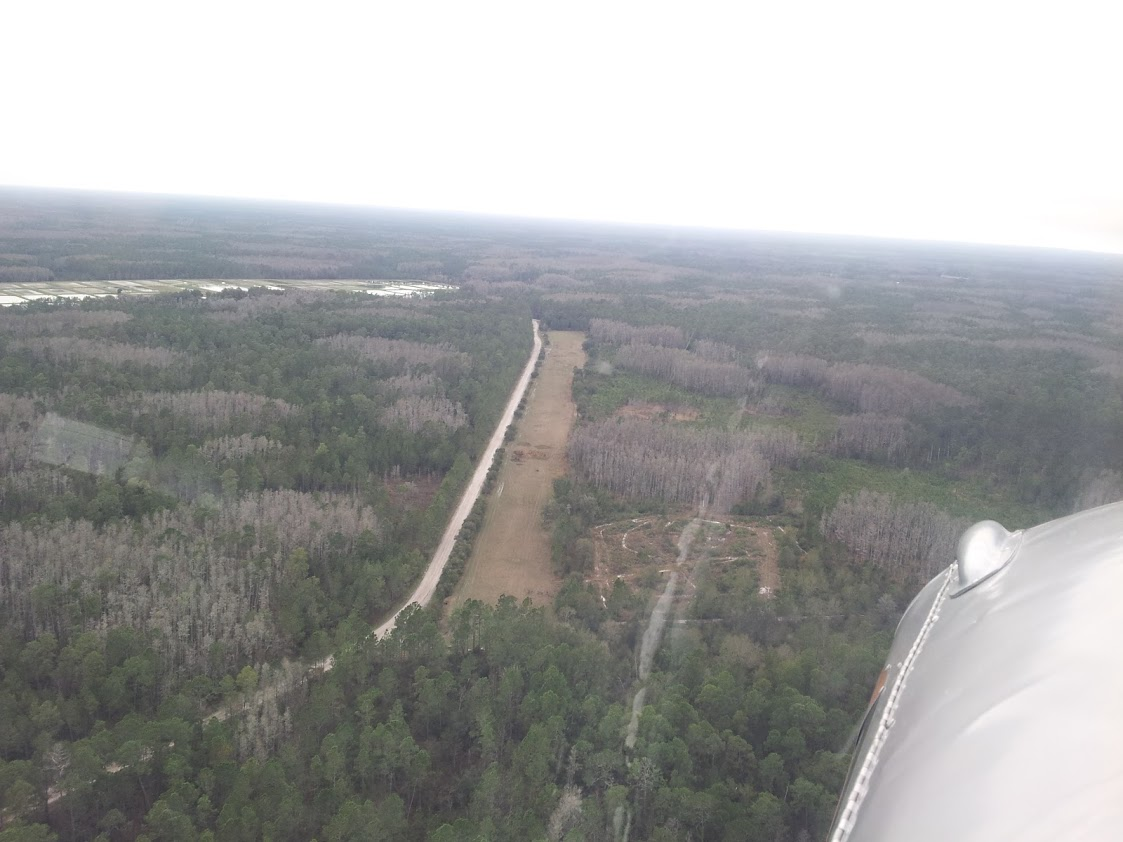
Remnants of Withlacoochee Army Airfield - January 13, 2013

== See also ==
- Florida World War II Army Airfields
