= Boca Raton Airport =

Airport in Florida

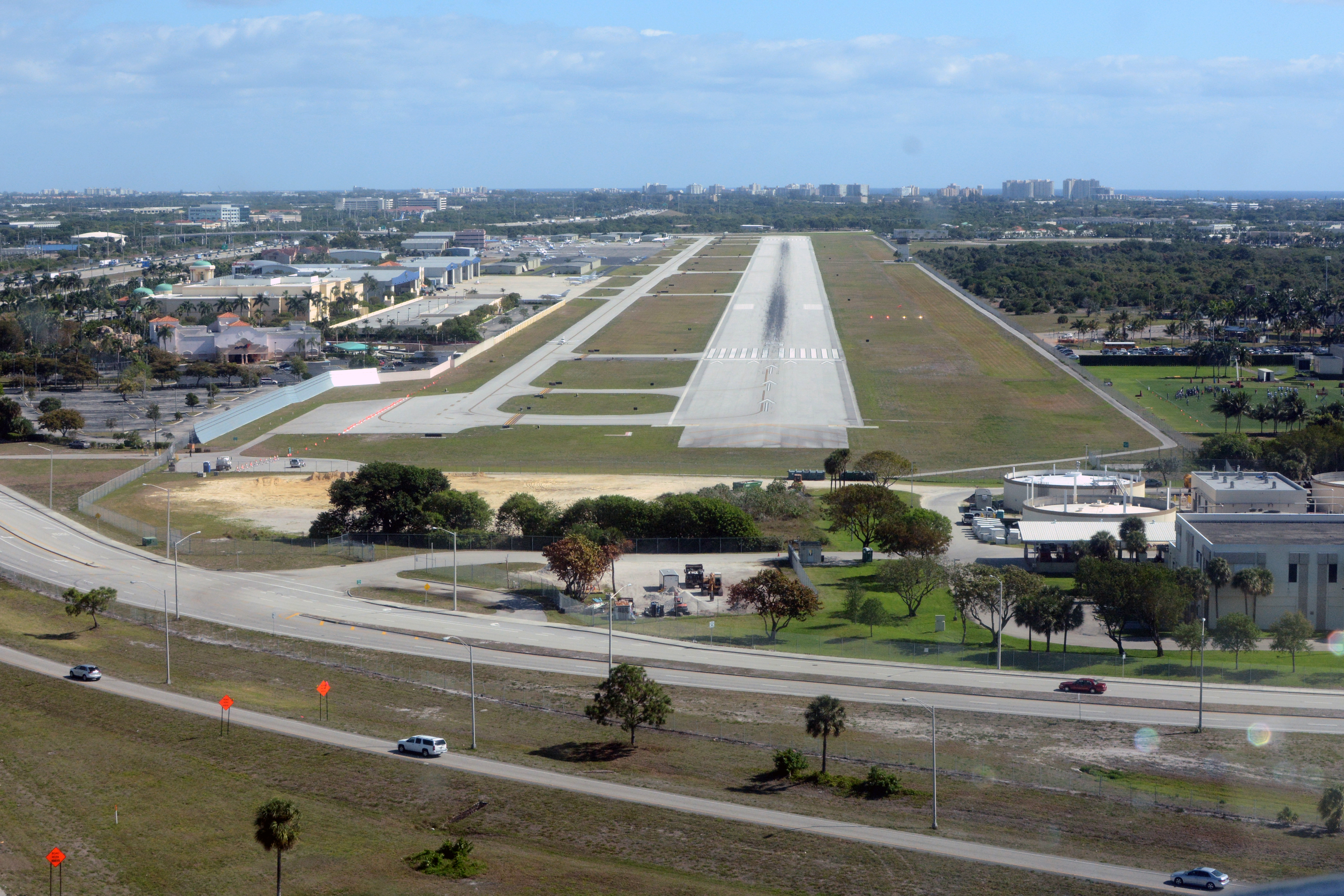
- Runway 5 on final approach
- IATA: BCT; ICAO: KBCT; FAA LID: BCT

Summary
- Airport type: Public
- Owner: State of Florida
- Operator: Boca Raton Airport Authority
- Serves: Greater Miami
- Elevation AMSL: 13 ft (4.0 m)
- Coordinates: 26°22′43″N 080°06′28″W
- Website: www.bocaairport.com

Maps
- FAA airport diagram
- Interactive map of Boca Raton Airport

Runways
Direction	Length		Surface
Direction	ft	m	Surface
5/23	6,276	1,913	Asphalt

Statistics (2018)
- Aircraft operations: 81,550
- Based aircraft: 242
- Source: Federal Aviation Administration

Boca Raton Airport (IATA: BCT, ICAO: KBCT, FAA LID: BCT) is a state-owned public-use airport located two miles (3 km) northwest of the central business district of Boca Raton, a city in Palm Beach County, Florida, United States. The airport is immediately adjacent to Florida Atlantic University and to Interstate 95.

Boca Raton Airport is publicly owned and is designated as a general aviation transport facility governed by a seven-member Authority appointed by the City of Boca Raton and Palm Beach County Commission.

The airport regularly serves as a reliever and diversion airport when flight restrictions limit access to airports near President Donald Trump's Mar-a-Lago resort.

== History ==
=== Beginnings ===
See Boca Raton Army Airfield for the military use of the airport during World War II

Boca Raton Airport was established in 1936. In 1941, in response to the emerging Axis threat, the United States began to rapidly mobilize and expand its armed forces. In addition to enlarging its Army and Navy, the US also sought to expand its air forces. The service we know today as the U.S. Air Force was known prior to June 1941 as the U.S. Army Air Corps and after June 1941 as the U.S. Army Air Forces, and was a subordinate branch within the U.S. Army. To expand the air corps/air forces, new air bases were established throughout the United States, including bases in southern Florida at Homestead, Morrison Field in West Palm Beach, and Boca Raton Airport.

Boca Raton Airport, also known as Boca Raton Army Airfield, was selected to house a military airfield for a number of geographic and practical reasons. Southern Florida's climate and physical geography are generally considered mild compared to most northern locations. Florida experiences a winter climate characteristic of the subtropics. Lacking snow or low temperatures enabled military operations to continue year round. Florida also has consistently flat terrain, an ideal feature when training new and inexperienced pilots. Its location adjacent to the Atlantic Ocean and the Gulf of Mexico also provided ideal locations for flight training. Boca Raton was also chosen for practical purposes. In the early-1940s, Boca Raton's population numbered only 723. This enabled the United States government to take thousands of acres of land for its use without having to relocate a large number of people. However, this is not to say that the establishment of the military airfield was without controversy. A majority of the land was acquired from Japanese American farmers from the failing Yamato Colony, the land having been seized through the process of eminent domain, leaving many Japanese Americans little recourse in the early days of World War II. All of these conditions enabled construction of the military airfield to commence in June 1942.

=== After World War 2 ===
While most of the Boca Raton Army Air Field was deactivated in 1946, more than 800 acres (3.2 km^{2}) were retained as the Boca Raton Air Force Auxiliary Field. Another 85 acres (0.34 km^{2}) were used in the 1950s for a secret project to produce stem rust spores for possible use as a biological agent against wheat production in the Soviet Union. Other parts of the World War II air base were returned to private ownership and developed. In 1959 the remainder of the base was turned over to the City of Boca Raton and to the State of Florida. 200 acres (0.81 km^{2}) and a single runway (of three original runways), completely rebuilt, became Boca Raton Airport. The remaining land became the campus of Florida Atlantic University.

=== Recent history ===
The airport's first control tower opened in 2000. The tower was named after Philip Modder, who was the Chairman of the Boca Raton Airport Authority. Philip “Phil” Modder had pushed for Boca Raton, with its growing traffic of corporate jets, to have its own tower.

The airport suffered more than $12 million worth of damage to hangars when Hurricane Wilma passed through the area in October 2005.

In 1997, the restored original Aston Martin DB5 "Effects Car" from the James Bond film "Goldfinger" was stolen from a hangar at Boca Raton airport.

A U.S. Customs and Border Protection facility was scheduled to open in 2017 in order to allow Boca Raton Airport to process passengers arriving on international flights. Boca Raton Airport's Customs and Border Protection facility opened in May 2018.

The airport is listed as a potential future site for Advanced Air Mobility infrastructure development. Development is already underway at other nearby airports.

== Facilities and aircraft ==
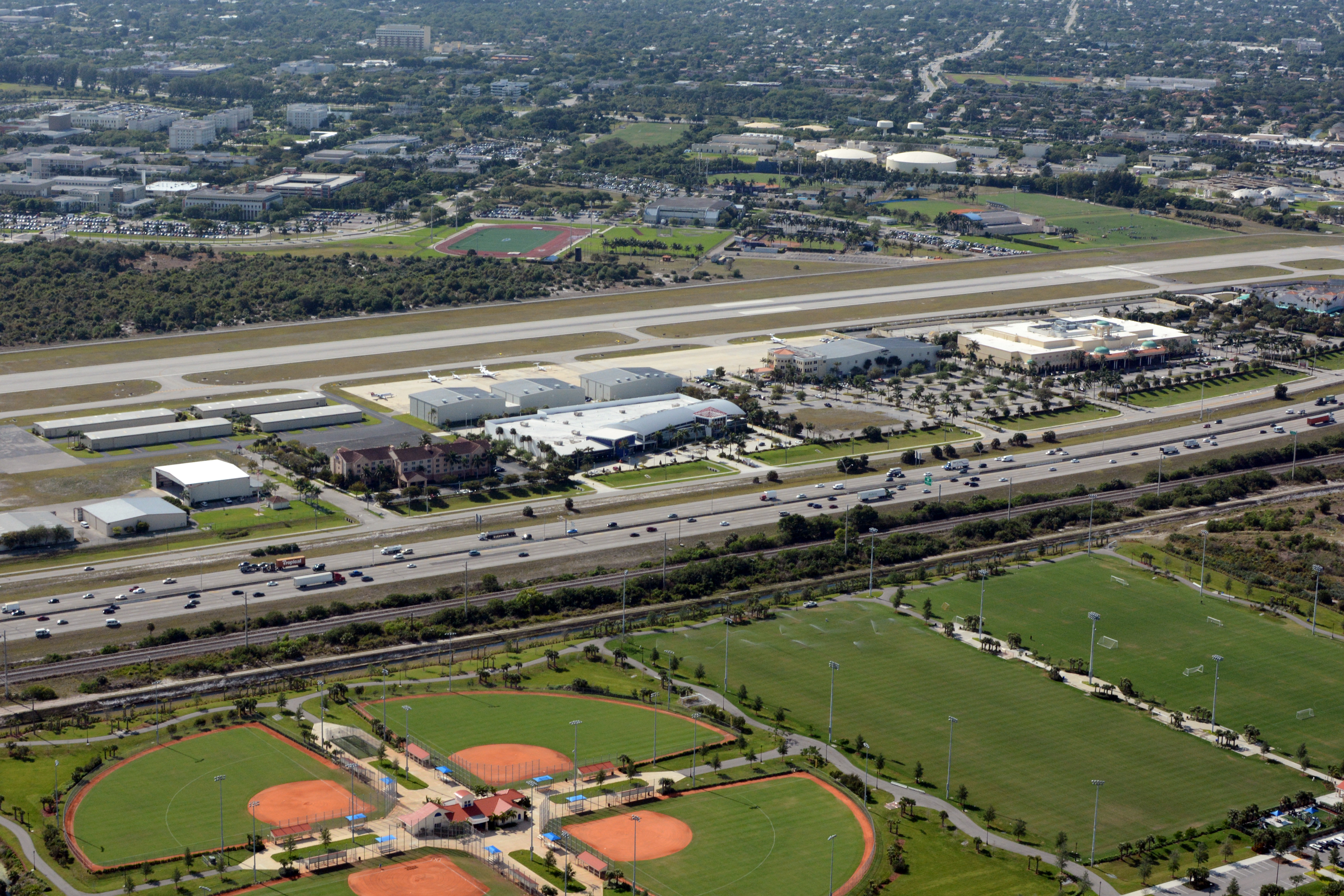
Boca Raton Airport, March 14, 2014

Boca Raton Airport covers an area of 214 acres (87 ha) and has one asphalt-paved runway designated 5/23, which measures 6,276 × 150 ft (1,913 × 46 m). The airport has a control tower which is staffed from 7:00 a.m. to 11:00 p.m. There are two full-service fixed-base operators, Signature Flight Support and Atlantic Aviation. The Burton D. Morgan School of Aeronautic of Lynn University is located at the airport.

For the 12-month period ending December 31, 2020, the airport had 81,550 aircraft operations, an average of 223 per day: 93% general aviation, 6% air taxi and <1% military. At that time there were 242 aircraft based at this airport: 130 single-engine, 27 multi-engine, 82 jet and 3 helicopter.

In 2025, a public viewing area opened at the airport to allow the public to watch planes and listen to ATC audio in real time.

== Accidents and incidents ==
- On August 8, 1956, a Sky Spray Fairchild C-82 Packet returning from a spraying mission experienced smoke coming from the #2 engine and a loss of power from the #1 engine on final approach to then Boca Raton Air Force Auxiliary Field. The aircraft in a banking manoeuvre lost control and crashed. All 5 occupants (2 crew, 3 passengers) died.
- On June 23, 2000, a Universal Jet Aviation Learjet 55 on a Visual flight rules (VFR) climb from BCT collided at an altitude of 2,400 feet 2.8 miles SW of Boca Raton with an Extra EA-300S which took off from Pompano Beach Airpark. Both aircraft crashed to the ground. All 3 occupants (2 crew, 1 passenger) on the Learjet 55 were killed along with the sole occupant of the Extra EA-300S.
- On April 11, 2025, a Cessna 310 reported having mechanical issues shortly after takeoff from BCT, causing it to crash into Interstate 95. All three occupants of the plane were killed and one person on the ground was injured.

== Airlines and destinations ==
In 2023, JSX, which has codeshare partnerships with United Airlines and JetBlue, added Boca Raton to its list of destinations. Despite building a niche following in South Palm Beach County, JSX announced on July 2, 2025, that it would cease operations at Boca Raton Airport due to the planned demolition of the hangar it operated out of.

== See also ==
- List of airports in Florida
- Palm Beach International Airport
