= Bartow Executive Airport =

Public airport near Bartow, Florida, United States

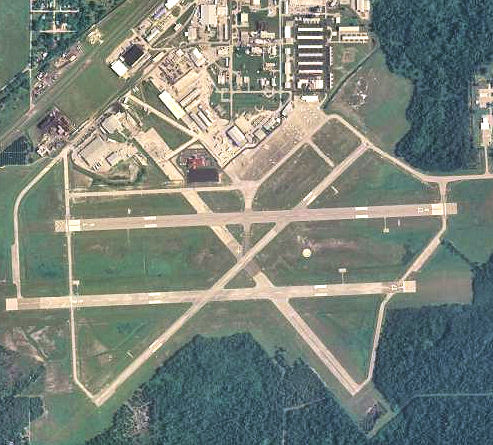
- 2006 USGS airphoto
- IATA: BOW; ICAO: KBOW; FAA LID: BOW

Summary
- Airport type: Public
- Owner: Bartow Airport Authority
- Serves: Bartow, Florida
- Location: Polk County, near Bartow, Florida
- Elevation AMSL: 125 ft (38 m)
- Coordinates: 27°56′36″N 081°47′00″W
- Website: www.bartow-airport.com

Map
- Location of Bartow Executive Airport KBOW (the United States)

Runways
| Direction | Length | | Surface |
| Direction | ft | m | Surface |
|---|---|---|---|
| 05/23 | 5,000 | 1,524 | Asphalt |
| 09L/27R | 5,000 | 1,524 | Asphalt |
| 09R/27L | 4,400 | 1,341 | Asphalt |

Statistics (2002)
- Aircraft operations: 49,368
- Based aircraft: 115
- Source: Federal Aviation Administration

Bartow Executive Airport (IATA: BOW, ICAO: KBOW, FAA LID: BOW) is a public airport four miles (6 km) northeast of Bartow, in Polk County, Florida. It is owned by the Bartow Airport Authority.

== Facilities ==
The airport covers 1,846 acres (747 ha) and has three asphalt runways:

- Runway 5/23: 5,000 x 100 ft (1,524 x 30 m)
- Runway 9L/27R: 5,000 x 150 ft (1,524 x 46 m)
- Runway 9R/27L: 4,400 x 150 ft (1,341 x 46 m)

Bartow Executive is a controlled airport with an FAA Level I contract Air Traffic Control Tower in daily operation 0730 to 1730 local time.

In the year ending July 15, 2002, the airport had 49,368 aircraft operations, average 135 per day: 100% general aviation and <1% military. 115 aircraft are based at this airport: 82% single engine, 9% multi-engine, 4% jet aircraft and 5% helicopters.

== Airport services ==
- Fuel Available:

100LL Full Service / 100 LL Self Service / JetA with Prist additive / JetA

- Airframe Service: Major
- Powerplant service: Major
- Paint Shop

== History ==
In 1941 Bartow Mayor C.E. Williams spearheaded the city's initial land acquisition for what would become the Bartow Municipal Airport. In 1942 the US Government took over the site and later developed it into a training field for the U.S. Army Air Forces. Through World War II the field was used for pilot training.

The base was ordered deactivated on 25 October 1945 and it closed by the end of the year. The airport was then returned to the City of Bartow by the General Services Administration (GSA). GSA required that the airport be used as an airport, and if not, that it be returned to the U.S. Government. In 1945–1950 a fixed-base operator (FBO) ran the airfield and flight line, while the large complex of support buildings that had been built by the Federal Government was used by industry and for storage.

In 1946 about 32 former military barracks were converted into apartments for returning military veterans.

In 1950 the U.S. Government exercised its reversal clause for the facility and again took control. The Department of Defense concurrently called for bids from civilian contractors to man and operate a primary pilot training school for U.S. Air Force student pilots. Renamed Bartow Air Base, the installation was a USAF primary flight training facility for the Air Training Command (ATC) from 1951 to 1960. USAF operations officially ended in 1961 and the facility was transferred to the city again by the GSA. Forty years after the deactivation of Bartow AB, a retired USAF T-37 was loaned to the city and the airport by the National Museum of the United States Air Force and placed on a permanent static display pylon as a memorial to the former U.S. Army Air Forces and U.S. Air Force presence at Bartow. The T-37 is near the former air base main gate, now the airport entrance, and The Museum Room in the airport's main terminal commemorates the airport's military heritage.

From 1960 through 1967 the City of Bartow again managed the airport and the aviation facilities were again leased to a fixed-base operator. In 1964 the City requested authority from the Federal Aviation Administration to convert a large building area into an industrial park. The concept was approved and the industrial park opened. In July 1967 the City of Bartow established the Bartow Municipal Airport Development Authority, with five city commission members and an executive director.

In 2019, Bartow Municipal Airport and Industrial Park was renamed to Bartow Executive Airport. The authority name was also changed to what is now known as the Bartow Airport Authority.

The airport has been self-supporting since its inception. Using its aircraft refueling, storage facilities and Industrial Park for revenues, the Authority has maintained the facility as a public airport.

== See also ==
- List of airports in Florida
