= EMJ =

EMJ may refer to:

- Emergency Medicine Journal, a peer-reviewed medical journal
- EMJ, ICAO code for Yellow Air Taxi, an American airline
- EMJ, a brand name owned by Reliance Steel & Aluminum Co.
- EMJ, a category of Missing persons in the United States National Crime Information Center
- "EMJ (Emotional Musical Journey)", a bonus track on the 2011 album Welcome to Strangeland by Tech N9ne
- EMJ Data Systems, a company started by Canadian entrepreneur Jim Estill
- EMJ, Early Middle Japanese, spoken between 794 and 1185
