= Mario Henderson =

American football player (1984–2020)

No. 75
- Position: Offensive tackle

Personal information
- Born: October 29, 1984; Fort Myers, Florida, U.S.
- Died: October 21, 2020 (aged 35); Fort Myers, Florida, U.S.
- Listed height: 6 ft 6 in (1.98 m)
- Listed weight: 302 lb (137 kg)

Career information
- High school: Lehigh Acres Senior (Lehigh Acres, Florida)
- College: Florida State
- NFL draft: 2007: 3rd round, 91st overall pick

Career history
- Oakland Raiders (2007–2010); Colorado Ice (2011); San Diego Chargers (2012)*; Virginia Destroyers (2012); Utah Blaze (2013)*; Colorado Ice (2013); Tampa Bay Storm (2014–2015)
- * Offseason or practice squad member only

Career NFL statistics
- Games played: 44
- Games started: 28
- Stats at Pro Football Reference
- Stats at ArenaFan.com

Mario Henderson (October 29, 1984 – October 21, 2020) was an American professional football player who was an offensive tackle in the National Football League (NFL). He spent the first four years of his career with the Oakland Raiders, after being selected from Florida State in the 2007 NFL draft.

== Early life and college ==
Henderson originally attended Bishop Verot High School in Fort Myers, Florida. Henderson was a 375-pound freshman who'd never played football. His first year of football was his Freshman year. He also played varsity in the 2000-2001 season at Verot.

After his sophomore year, Henderson transferred to Lehigh Senior High School. Due to transfer rules, he was not able to play during his junior year. He used that time to change his physique and, in his senior year, earned a scholarship to Florida State University. His senior year, he averaged 28 points per game and 14 rebounds, and was 1st team all state and 1st team all county as a member of Lehigh Senior basketball team.

== Professional career ==
=== Oakland Raiders ===
After starting only one year his senior year of college, Henderson was selected by the Raiders in the third round of the 2007 NFL draft with the 91st overall pick, along with Jamarcus Russell. In his second year, he started several games at left tackle in place of injured veteran Kwame Harris, and was the Raiders' full-time left tackle in 2008, 2009, and 2010.

=== Colorado Ice (first stint) ===
Henderson played with the Colorado Ice of the Indoor Football League for the 2011 season.

=== San Diego Chargers ===
Henderson signed with the San Diego Chargers on April 13, 2012. He was released during final roster cuts on August 31, 2012.

=== Utah Blaze ===
Henderson signed with the Utah Blaze of the Arena Football League (AFL) on November 9, 2012. He was placed on the reserve/refused to report list on March 1, 2013.

=== Colorado Ice (second stint) ===
Henderson re-signed with the Ice in May 2013.

=== Tampa Bay Storm ===
Henderson signed with the Tampa Bay Storm of the AFL in March 2014. He re-signed with the team after the 2014 season on October 9, 2014. He was placed on the reserve/refused to report list on March 5, 2015. He was placed on reassignment on March 1, 2016.

== Personal life ==
On March 17, 2011, Henderson was arrested in Fort Myers on the charge of carrying a concealed firearm.

On October 21, 2020, Henderson died at the age of 35.
