= Lehigh Senior High School =

Lehigh High School

Location
- 901 Gunnery Rd N Lehigh Acres, Florida 33971; United States
- Coordinates: 26.622378°N 81.719592°W

Information
- Type: Public (Magnet) High School
- Motto: Time to Strike
- Established: 1993
- School district: Lee County School District
- Principal: Darya Grote
- Teaching staff: 101.50 FTEs
- Grades: 9-12
- Enrollment: 2,509 (2023-2024)
- Student to teacher ratio: 24.72
- Color(s): Blue and gold
- Mascot: Zeus
- Nickname: Lightning
- Website: lsh.leeschools.net

Lehigh Senior High School is located in Lehigh Acres, Florida, a suburb of Fort Myers. It is one of the largest high schools in Lee County. The current principal is Darya Grote. It is part of the Lee County School District. Lehigh currently has the highest percent of incoming students in Lee County. It is commonly referred to as "The Center of the Arts", being that it is recognized as one by the local school district for its zone. In addition to Lehigh Senior's dedication to the arts, it also offers dual enrollment classes that allow students to earn college credits for free through Florida SouthWestern State College. It is also now recognized as of 2008 as a University of Cambridge International School and also offers programs called AVID and Advanced Placement. The school is now also considered an Avid National Demonstration School.

== Statistics ==
As of the 2014–15 school year, the school had an enrollment of 1,884 students and 102.0 classroom teachers (on an FTE basis), for a student–teacher ratio of 18.5:1. There were 1,345 students (71.4% of enrollment) eligible for free lunch and 181 (9.6% of students) eligible for reduced-cost lunch.

As of 2014–15, the school's population is 47% Hispanic, 34% Black, 15% Caucasian, and 4% Other. In 2007, the school achieved the highest graduation rate in its history. In 2023, the school's JROTC program is one of the largest in the nation, with 1080 cadets. The school has 2502 students enrolled as of 2023.

== Notable alumni ==
- Phillip Buchanon, football player
- Austin Carlile, singer
- Jeremiah Davis, track & field athlete
- Ryan Flinn, football player
- Steven Gachette, football player
- Mario Henderson, football player
- Robert Jackson, football player
- Quan Martin, football player
- Erick McIntosh, football player
- Reconcile, rapper
- Jeremy Ware, football player
- Derrick Wells, football player
