= Derrick Wells =

American football player (born 1993)

Profile
- Position: Safety

Personal information
- Born: July 8, 1993 (age 33); Charleston Park, Florida, U.S.
- Listed height: 6 ft 0 in (1.83 m)
- Listed weight: 201 lb (91 kg)

Career information
- High school: Lehigh (Lehigh Acres, Florida)
- College: Minnesota
- NFL draft: 2015: undrafted

Career history
- Tampa Bay Buccaneers (2015)

Derrick Wells (born July 8, 1993) is an American football safety. He played college football at Minnesota.

== Tampa Bay Buccaneers ==
Wells was signed as an undrafted rookie on May 18, 2015.
