= List of airline codes (Y) =

This is a list of all airline codes. The table lists the IATA airline designators, the ICAO airline designators and the airline call signs (telephony designator). Historical assignments are also included for completeness.

== Codes ==
Airline codes
IATA	ICAO	Airline	Call sign	Country	Comments
	DGA	Yellow River Delta General Aviation	YELLOW RIVER	China	
	YRG	Yak Air	YAKAIR GEORGIA	Georgia	
	AKY	Yak-Service	YAK-SERVICE	Russia	
	YAK	Yakolev	YAK AVIA	Russia	Yak Design Bureau
YL	LLM	Yamal Airlines	YAMAL	Russia	
R3	SYL	Yakutia Airlines	AIR YAKUTIA	Russia	
	CYG	Yana Airlines	VICAIR	Cambodia	
	AYG	Yangon Airways	AIR YANGON	Burma	
Y8	YZR	Suparna Airlines	YANGTZE RIVER	China	Former name: Yangtze River Express
	LYH	Yankee Lima Helicopteres	HELIGUYANE	France	
	MHD	Yas Air Kish	YAS AIR	Iran	
Y0	EMJ	Yellow Air Taxi/Friendship Airways		United States	
	ELW	Yellow Wings Air Services	YELLOW WINGS	Kenya	
IY	IYE	Yemenia	YEMENI	Yemen	
	ERV	Yerevan-Avia	YEREVAN-AVIA	Armenia	
YT	NYT	Yeti Airlines	YETI AIRLINES	Nepal	Domestic
	YFS	Young Flying Service	YOUNG AIR	United States	
	AYU	Yuhi Air Lines		Japan	
	AYE	Yunnan Yingan Airlines	AIR YING AN	China	
4Y	TUD	Yute Air Alaska	TUNDRA	United States	defunct 2017
	UGN	Yuzhnaya Aircompany	PLUTON	Kazakhstan	
2N	UMK	Yuzhmashavia	YUZMASH	Ukraine	

^{*} on IATA code indicates a controlled duplicate.
italics indicates a defunct airline.

== IATA Traffic Conference Areas ==
The International Air Transport Association (IATA) divides the world into three areas called the Traffic Conference Areas (TCAs) for air travel purposes. These areas are used to define geographical boundaries for fare construction and other industry-related practices:

- Traffic Conference Area 1 (TC1) – this area includes the Americas, encompassing North America (the Caribbean, Central America, and Northern America) and South America.
- Traffic Conference Area 2 (TC2) – this area includes the EMEA region, encompassing Europe, the Middle East, and Africa (North Africa and Sub-Saharan Africa).
- Traffic Conference Area 3 (TC3) – this area includes the Asia–Pacific region, encompassing the rest of Asia (Central Asia, East Asia, North Asia, South Asia, and Southeast Asia) and Oceania.

Essentially, TC1 covers the "New World", while TC2 and TC3 together cover the "Old World" (Africa-Eurasia) and the "Land Down Under".

== See also ==
- IATA airport code
- ICAO airport code
