= Quan Martin =

American football player (born 2000)

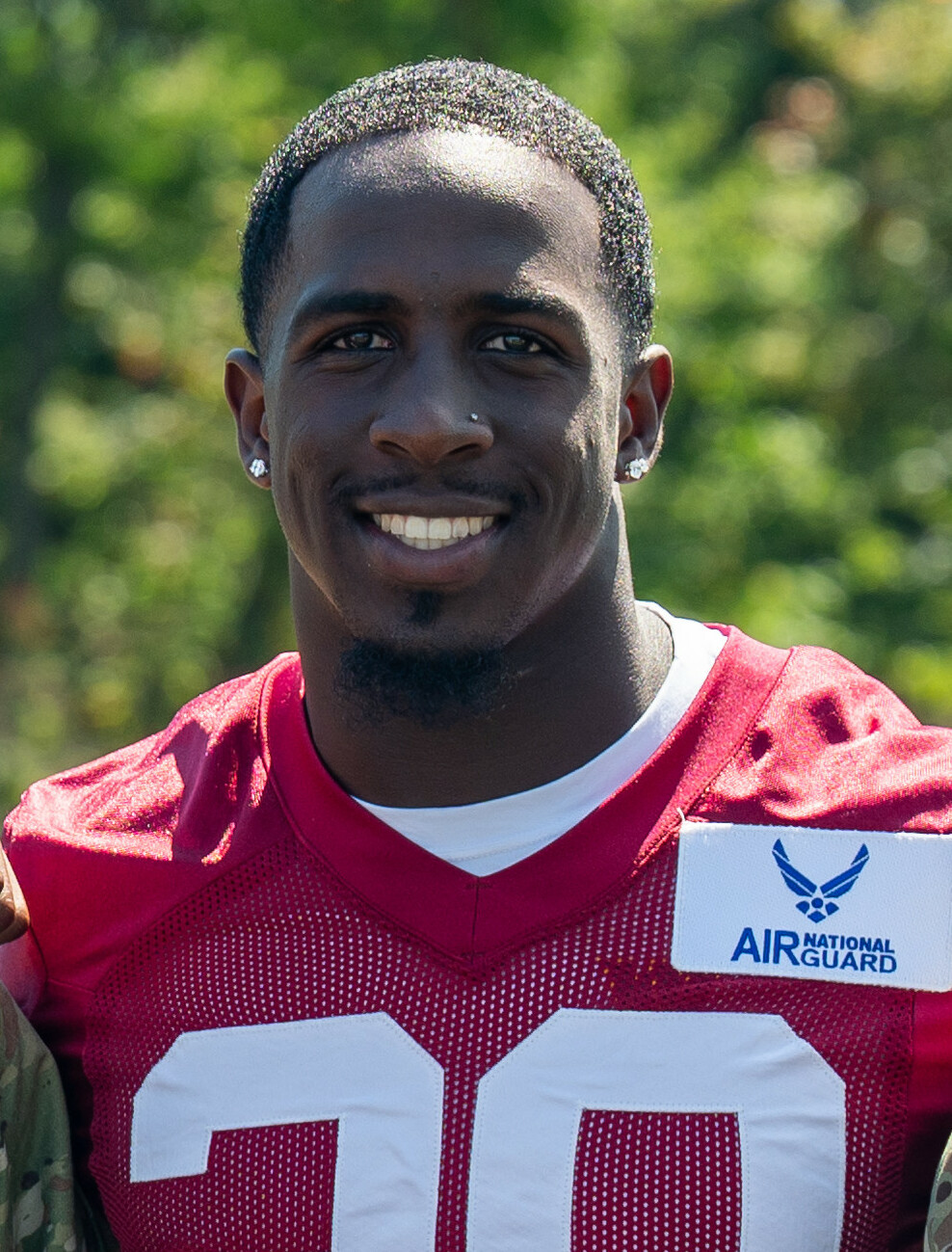
- Martin in 2023

No. 20 – Washington Commanders
- Position: Safety
- Roster status: Active

Personal information
- Born: April 17, 2000 (age 26); Lehigh Acres, Florida, U.S.
- Listed height: 6 ft 0 in (1.83 m)
- Listed weight: 195 lb (88 kg)

Career information
- High school: Lehigh Senior
- College: Illinois (2018–2022)
- NFL draft: 2023: 2nd round, 47th overall pick

Career history
- Washington Commanders (2023–present)

Awards and highlights
- Second-team All-Big Ten (2022)

Career NFL statistics as of 2025
- Tackles: 232
- Sacks: 1
- Forced fumbles: 4
- Pass deflections: 10
- Interceptions: 3
- Stats at Pro Football Reference

Jartavius Quan Martin (born April 17, 2000) is an American professional football safety for the Washington Commanders of the National Football League (NFL). He played college football for the Illinois Fighting Illini and was selected by the Commanders in the second round of the 2023 NFL draft.

== Early life ==
Martin was born on April 17, 2000, in Lehigh Acres, Florida. He attended Lehigh Senior High School, where he recorded 38 tackles and two interceptions for their football team. Martin was rated a three-star recruit and committed to play college football for the Fighting Illini at the University of Illinois Urbana-Champaign.

== College career ==
Martin moved to cornerback as a freshman and became a starter early on. Martin was moved back to safety in 2021. He finished the season with 55 tackles, 3.5 tackles for loss, one interception, seven passes broken up, and one forced fumble. Martin used the extra year of eligibility granted to college athletes in 2020 due to the COVID-19 pandemic and returned for a fifth season in 2022.

== Professional career ==
Pre-draft measurables
Height	Weight	Arm length	Hand span	Wingspan	40-yard dash	10-yard split	20-yard split	Vertical jump	Broad jump	Bench press
5 ft 11 in (1.80 m)	194 lb (88 kg)	31 1/8 in (0.79 m)	9 5/8 in (0.24 m)	6 ft 5 3/8 in (1.97 m)	4.46 s	1.47 s	2.51 s	44.0 in (1.12 m)	11 ft 1 in (3.38 m)	15 reps
All values from NFL Combine

=== 2023 ===
The Washington Commanders selected Martin in the second round (47th overall) of the 2023 NFL draft. He was the second safety selected after second-round pick (45th overall) Brian Branch. He notably became the first of five defensive backs drafted from the same Illinois' secondary spanning from 2018 to 2020. His fellow defensive backs from Illinois included Nate Hobbs (2021), Kerby Joseph (2022), Devon Witherspoon (2022), and Sydney Brown (2023).

On July 22, 2023, the Commanders signed Martin to a four–year, $7.63 million rookie contract that includes $5.11 million guaranteed upon signing and an initial signing bonus of $2.55 million.

He entered training camp projected to compete for a role as a starting nickelback against Danny Johnson and was a possible candidate to be a starting safety along with Kamren Curl and Darrick Forrest. Defensive coordinator Jack Del Rio had Martin learn to play safety, cornerback, and nickelback during training camp. Martin looked impressive throughout training camp, but struggled throughout the preseason. Head coach Ron Rivera named him a backup and listed him as the fifth safety on the depth chart to begin the season, behind Kamren Curl, Darrick Forrest, Jeremy Reaves, and Percy Butler.

On September 10, 2023, Martin made his professional regular season debut in the Washington Commanders' home-opener against the Arizona Cardinals, but was limited to 18 snaps on special teams before leaving for a concussion evaluation as the Commanders won 20–16. He was confirmed to have suffered a concussion and subsequently remained inactive for the Commanders' 35–33 victory at the Denver Broncos in Week 2. He was relegated to special teams for the first four games of the season. Martin began earning significant snaps on defense in Week 6 after Darrick Forrest was placed on injured reserve due to a shoulder injury. On Week 9, Martin recorded one pass deflection and sealed the Commanders' 20–17 victory at the New England Patriots after making his first career interception on a pass by Mac Jones to wide receiver JuJu Smith-Schuster with 38 seconds remaining. In Week 12, he earned his first career start as a nickelback and recorded two combined tackles (one solo) during a 10–45 loss at the Dallas Cowboys. Following the game, head coach Ron Rivera fired defensive coordinator Jack Del Rio and took over as his replacement for the remainder of the season. On December 17, 2023, Martin set a season-high with ten combined tackles (seven solo) and had his first career sack on Matthew Stafford during a 20–28 loss at the Los Angeles Rams. In Week 18, he made four combined tackles (three solo), one pass deflection, and intercepted a pass by Dak Prescott to wide receiver Michael Gallup during a 10–38 loss to the Dallas Cowboys. He finished his rookie season with a total of 46 combined tackles (28 solo), four pass deflections, two interceptions, and one sack in 16 games and five starts. He had all five starts as a nickelback and started the last four games. Head coach Ron Rivera was fired following the completion of the 2024 NFL season after the Commanders finished with a 4–13 record. He received an overall grade of 65.4 from Pro Football Focus as a rookie in 2023.

=== 2024 ===
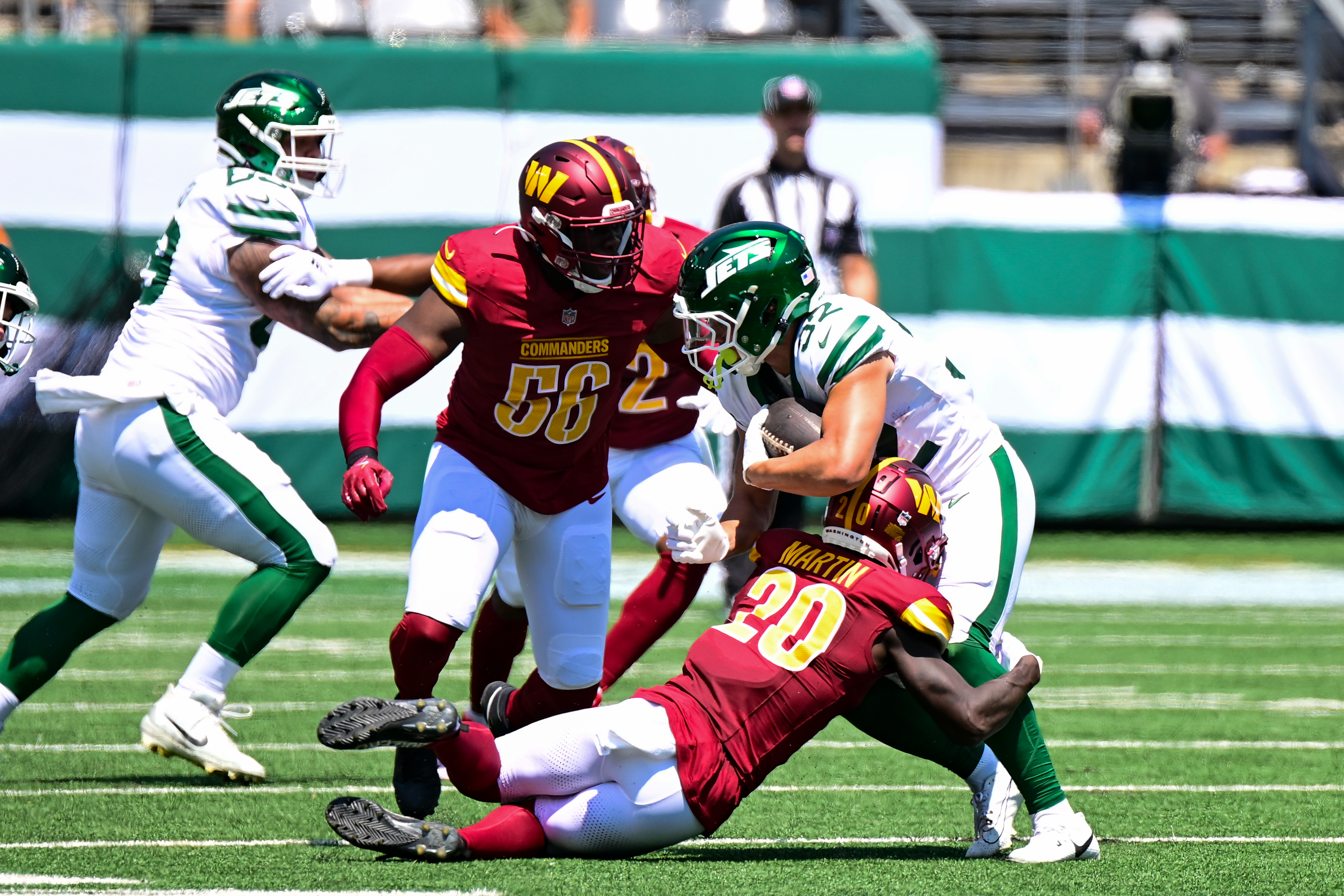
Martin making a tackle against the New York Jets, 2024

In the 2024 offseason, Martin competed for a starting position at safety, along with Jeremy Chinn, Darrick Forrest, and Percy Butler. New head coach Dan Quinn and defensive coordinator Joe Whitt Jr. selected him to be the starting free safety to begin with season and paired him with starting strong safety, Jeremy Chinn.

On October 27, 2024, Martin set a season-high with 11 combined tackles (nine solo) as the Commanders defeated the Chicago Bears 18–15. On December 29, 2024, Martin made eight combined tackles (seven solo), set a season-high with two pass deflections, and had his lone interception of the season on a pass thrown by Michael Penix Jr. to wide receiver during a 30–24 overtime victory against the Atlanta Falcons. He was inactive for the Commanders' 23–19 victory at the Dallas Cowboys in Week 18 due to an unspecified illness. He finished the season with 87 combined tackles (50 solo), three pass deflections, and only one interception in 16 games and 16 starts. He received an overall grade of 59.2 from Pro Football Focus, which ranked 115th amongst 171 qualifying safeties in 2024.

On January 12, 2025, Martin started in his first career playoff game and recorded four combined tackles (two solo) during a 23–20 victory at the Tampa Bay Buccaneers in the NFC Wild-Card Game.The next week, he made three combined tackles (two solo), one pass deflection, and had his first career pick-six after intercepting a pass by Jared Goff to wide receiver Tim Patrick and returning it 40–yards to score the first touchdown of his career during a 45–31 victory at the Detroit Lions in the Divisional Round. In the NFC Championship Game against the Philadelphia Eagles and recorded five combined tackles (three solo).

=== 2025 ===
At the start of the 2025 season, Martin was named the starting free safety again opposite of Will Harris. Throughout the season, Martin's gameplay was criticized specifically when it came to his tackling. Week 4's 34-27 loss to the Atlanta Falcons both Martin and Jeremy Reaves were highlighted as key factors in the defense's struggles with a highlight of both failing to tackle running back Tyler Allgeier before scoring a 15-yard touchdown. On Monday Night Football, Martin missed a key tackle in the fourth quarter on Chicago Bears running back D'Andre Swift, who would score a 55-yard rushing touchdown and contributed to the 25-24 loss. In Week 16, he was ejected for throwing a punch after a brawl broke out between the Washington defense and Philadelphia offense in the fourth quarter. On the Christmas matchup against the Dallas Cowboys, Martin was benched by head coach Dan Quinn in the second quarter following a blown coverage assignment which resulted in a 86-yard receiving touchdown by KaVontae Turpin.

== Career statistics ==
Legend
	Led the league
**Bold**	Career high

=== NFL ===
==== Regular season ====
Year	Team	Games		Tackles					Interceptions						Fumbles				
Year	Team	GP	GS	Cmb	Solo	Ast	Sck	TFL	Int	Yds	Avg	Lng	TD	PD	FF	Fmb	FR	Yds	TD
2023	WAS	16	5	46	28	18	**1.0**	1	**2**	7	3.5	7	0	**4**	0	0	0	0	0
2024	WAS	16	16	87	50	37	0.0	**2**	1	**29**	**29.0**	**29**	0	3	**3**	0	0	0	0
2025	WAS	17	16	**99**	**52**	**47**	0.0	1	0	0	0.0	0	0	3	1	0	0	0	0
Career		49	37	232	130	102	1.0	4	3	36	12.0	29	0	10	4	0	0	0	0

==== Postseason ====
Year	Team	Games		Tackles					Interceptions						Fumbles				
Year	Team	GP	GS	Cmb	Solo	Ast	Sck	TFL	Int	Yds	Avg	Lng	TD	PD	FF	Fmb	FR	Yds	TD
2024	WAS	3	3	12	7	5	0.0	0	1	40	40.0	40	1	1	0	0	0	0	0
Career		3	3	12	7	5	0.0	0	1	40	40.0	40	1	1	0	0	0	0	0

=== College ===
College statistics
Season	Games	Tackles	Solo	Ast	TFL	Sacks	Int	FF	FR	TD	PD
2018	9	44	25	19	2	0	**3**	0	0	0	3
2019	8	23	14	9	2	0	0	0	**2**	0	0
2020	8	38	25	13	0	0	0	1	0	0	2
2021	12	56	33	**23**	**3.5**	0	1	0	0	0	6
2022	13	**64**	**51**	13	**3.5**	**1**	**3**	**2**	0	0	**11**
Career	50	225	148	77	10.5	1	7	3	2	0	22

== Personal life ==
Martin goes by his middle name Quan. He works as an unofficial team barber for the teams he plays for; he learned the profession by watching videos on YouTube during the 2020 COVID-19 lockdowns.
