= Jeremy Ware (American football) =

American football player (born 1986)

No. 2, 9, 23
- Position: Cornerback

Personal information
- Born: September 18, 1986 (age 40); Fort Myers, Florida, U.S.
- Listed height: 5 ft 10 in (1.78 m)
- Listed weight: 184 lb (83 kg)

Career information
- High school: Lehigh Senior (Lehigh Acres, Florida)
- College: Michigan State
- NFL draft: 2010: 7th round, 215th overall pick

Career history
- Oakland Raiders (2010); Chicago Bears (2012)*; Florida Tarpons (2015–2016)
- * Offseason or practice squad member only

Awards and highlights
- X-League champion (2015)

Career NFL statistics
- Total tackles: 1
- Pass deflections: 3
- Interceptions: 1
- Stats at Pro Football Reference

Jeremy Ware (born September 18, 1986) is an American former professional football player who was a defensive back for the Oakland Raiders of the National Football League (NFL).

Ware was selected with the 215th overall pick in the seventh round of the 2010 NFL draft by the Oakland Raiders after playing at Michigan State University and at Lehigh Senior High School in his hometown. He played in eight games for the Raiders in 2010, recording one tackle and three passes defended. He was placed on injured reserve during the 2011 season, and was released at the end of the season.

Ware was signed by the Bears on July 28, 2012. On August 11, 2012, Ware was waived by the Bears.

In 2015, Ware played with the Florida Tarpons of X-League Indoor Football. He was released on April 1, 2016, but re-signed with the team on April 26, 2016.

His father, Riley Ware, played in the Arena Football League.
