= Steven Gachette =

American gridiron football player (born 1988)

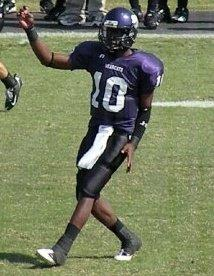

No. 6
- Position: Quarterback

Personal information
- Born: July 28, 1988 (age 38); Miami, Florida, U.S.
- Listed height: 6 ft 1 in (1.85 m)
- Listed weight: 195 lb (88 kg)

Career information
- High school: Lehigh Senior High School
- College: Southwest Baptist
- NFL draft: 2011: undrafted

Career history
- Calgary Stampeders (2011)*; Kansas City Command (2011–2012); Allen Wranglers (2012); Philadelphia Soul (2013); Orlando Predators (2013)
- * Offseason or practice squad member only

Career AFL statistics
- Completions: 9
- Attempts: 14
- Yards: 93
- Touchdowns: 1
- Interceptions: 0
- Stats at ArenaFan.com

Steven Gachette (born July 28, 1988) is a former American professional football quarterback. He was also a member of the Calgary Stampeders, Kansas City Command, Allen Wranglers, Philadelphia Soul and Orlando Predators. He played college football at NCAA Division II Southwest Baptist University.

== Early life ==
Gachette played high school football at Lehigh Senior High School in Lehigh Acres, Florida.

== College career ==
In 2007, he started his redshirt freshman season for the Southwest Baptist University and started every game for the Bearcats, completing 315 of 515 passes for 2,953 yards, and 15 touchdowns. He also rushed for seven touchdowns on 104 attempts for 461 yards.

In 2008, Gachette again started every game for the Bearcats. He threw for 3,360 yards on 27 touchdowns, while having a completion percentage of 59.9% on 296 completions on 494 attempts. He also ran the ball 159 times, for 947 yards and six touchdowns en route to being named First Team All-Independent and the ICAA Player of the Year.

In early 2009, Gachette was named D-II Pre Season All-American and Pre Season All-Conference. He completed 61.6% of his passes for 28 touchdowns and 3,015 yards and rushed for 1,158 yards on 7.0 yards per carry, for 8 touchdowns. Gachette was named a Harlon Hill Regional Finalist, AFCA All-State Good Works Team nominee, was honorable mention D-II All-American, Conference Player of the Year, among other awards. By the end of the season, Steven had broken 18 SBU records.

Once again in early 2010, Gachette was named to the D-II Pre Season All-American team, and Pre Season All-Conference. He passed for 3,247 yards while completing 66.2% of passes he attempted and threw for 24 touchdowns. In this season, Gachette carried the ball 129 times for 1,018 yards and 15 touchdowns. He was named Conference Player of the Year for the third time in his career, and named a Harlon Hill Regional Finalist for the second straight year.

Gachette walked onto the SBU football team in 2006 at only 140 Lbs. In his four-year career at SBU, Steven broke every SBU record by a quarterback. He also accounted for 15,000 total yards, as he threw 99 touchdown passes and ran for 35. Gachette holds the record for most career pass completions in NCAA Division II history with 1,119.

== Professional career ==
=== Calgary Stampeders ===
After going undrafted in the 2011 NFL draft, Gachette signed a two-year contract with the Calgary Stampeders of the Canadian Football League. He was released by the Stampeders on June 18, 2011 after only one preseason appearance.

=== Kansas City Command ===
In July 2011, Gachette signed with the Kansas City Command of the Arena Football League.

=== Allen Wranglers ===
On April 12, 2012, it was announced that Gachette had signed a contract to join the Allen Wranglers of the Indoor Football League. In his first game with the Wranglers, Gachette recorded 6 touchdowns on 232 yards.

=== Philadelphia Soul ===
Gachette was assigned to the Philadelphia Soul for the 2013 season. Gachette played 8 weeks with the Soul before they placed him on recallable reassignment on May 13, where he became a free agent two days later.

=== Orlando Predators ===
Just one day after his release, Gachette signed with the Orlando Predators.
