= Naples Airport (Florida) =

Airport in Naples, Florida

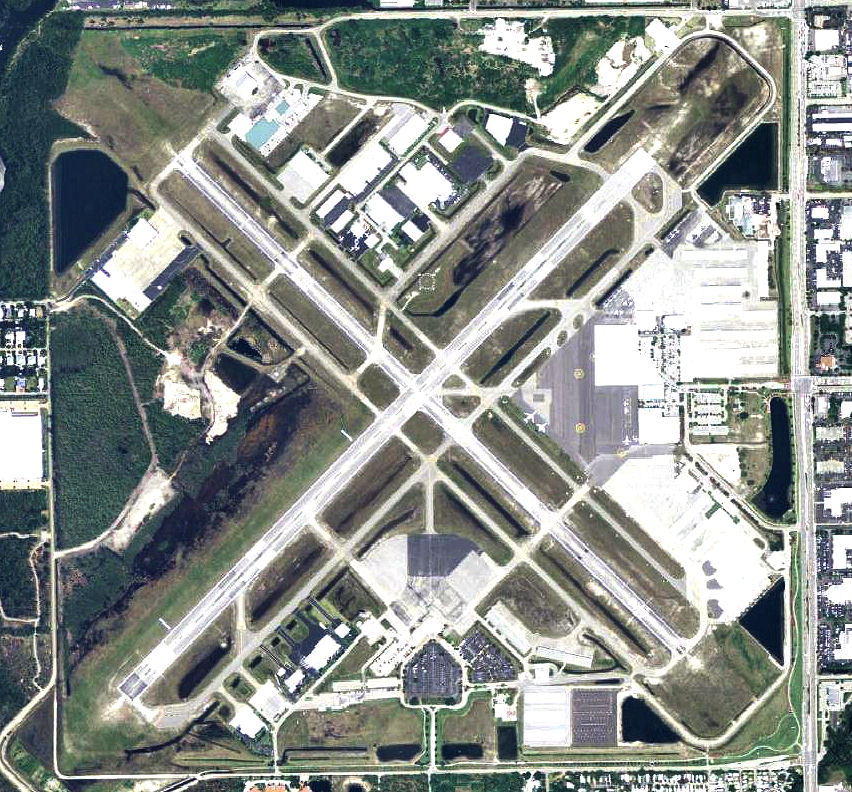
- USGS 2006 orthophoto
- IATA: APF; ICAO: KAPF; FAA LID: APF

Summary
- Airport type: Public
- Owner/Operator: Naples Airport Authority
- Serves: Naples, Florida, U.S.
- Built: 1942
- Elevation AMSL: 8 ft (2.4 m)
- Coordinates: 26°09′09″N 81°46′32″W
- Website: FlyNaples.com

Maps
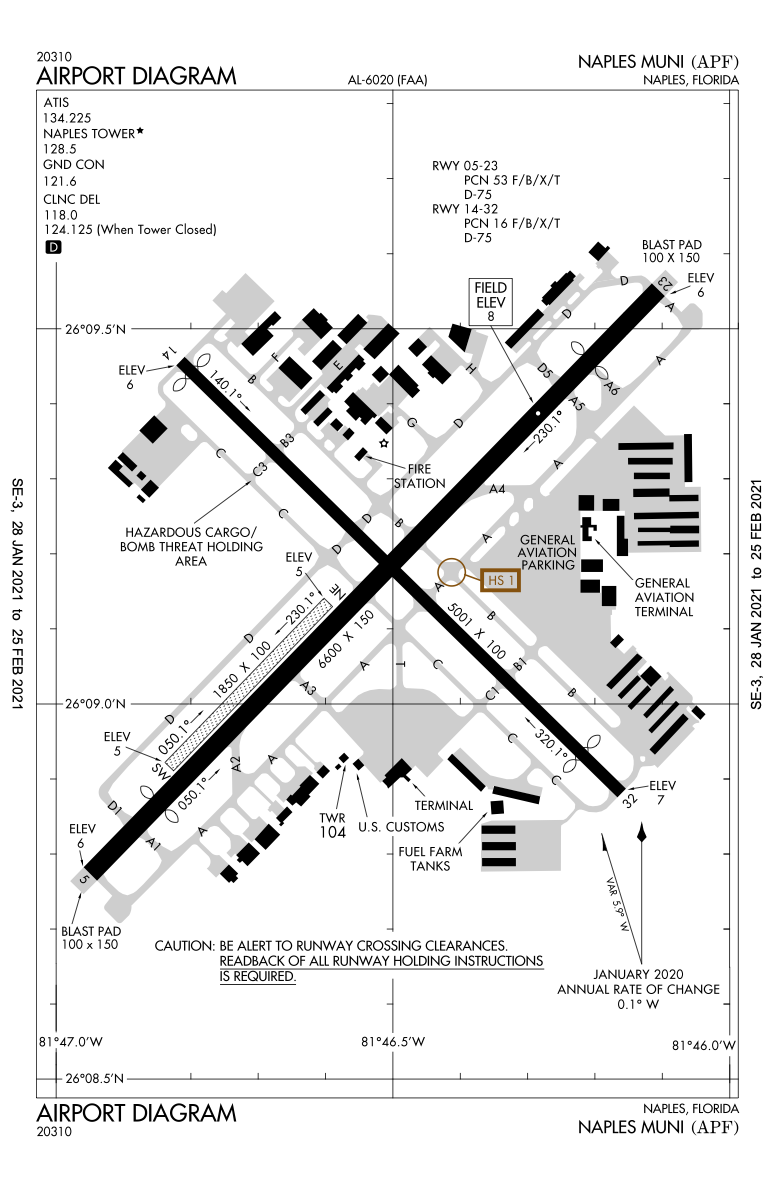
- FAA airport diagram
- Interactive map of Naples Airport

Runways
Direction	Length		Surface
Direction	ft	m	Surface
05/23	6,600	2,012	Asphalt
14/32	5,000	1,524	Asphalt
SW/NE	1,850	564	Turf

Statistics (2022)
- Aircraft operations: 113,137
- Based aircraft: 371
- Source: Federal Aviation Administration

Naples Airport (IATA: APF, ICAO: KAPF, FAA LID: APF), formerly known as Naples Municipal Airport, is a public use airport in Naples, Florida, located 2 nautical miles (3.7 km) northeast of the city's central business district. Naples is the most populous city and county seat of Collier County. It is owned by the Naples Airport Authority. The airport is home to flight schools, air charter operators, car rental agencies, and corporate aviation and non-aviation businesses. The airport is also a central location for public services, including fire/rescue services, mosquito control, the Collier County Sheriff's Aviation Unit and other community services.

During fiscal year 2021–2022, the airport serviced 113,137 operations. The airport is used almost exclusively for general aviation, with one airline, JSX, offering scheduled passenger service as of 2025.

== History ==
The facility was established in 1942 as Naples Army Air Field by the United States Army Air Forces. It was initially assigned to the Southeast Training Center (later Eastern Flying Training Command), and provided basic (level 1) flight training to flight cadets by Embry-Riddle Co; Fairchild PT-19s were the primary trainers used. Along with the flight training, it was a sub-base to Buckingham Army Air Field for flexible gunnery training, which the 75th Flying Training Wing supervised. It was inactivated as a military airfield in November 1945 and turned over to the War Assets Administration for conveyance to civil control as a public airport.

The Naples Airdrome was returned to the city of Naples and Collier County in 1947, after the military deemed it no longer necessary. The airport was managed by John Zate, a pilot and Naples resident. Provincetown-Boston Airlines (PBA) began scheduled service to Miami International Airport in the 1950s, and managed the airport for several years until a municipal airport authority was created in 1969. Also in 1969 the eye of Tropical Storm Jenny passed through the bottom left wing and top left wing of the airport and cause over $10,000+ in damage. The airport also historically had scheduled nonstop service from Miami, Orlando, Tampa, St. Pete–Clearwater, Fort Lauderdale, Fort Myers and Key West during the late 1970s operated by PBA with Douglas DC-3 and Martin 4-0-4 prop aircraft and also by Mackey International Airlines with Convair prop aircraft. Traffic at the airport peaked in 1980, when more than 195,000 passengers used the airport, but fell in the mid-1980s due to the opening of the much larger Southwest Florida International Airport in nearby Fort Myers. The airport code APF derives from "alternate Page Field" - which is a reference to Page Field in Fort Myers.

Piedmont Airlines (1948-1989) was operating scheduled passenger jet service from the airport in 1988 with nonstop Fokker F28 Fellowship flights to Tampa.; however, by 1989 Piedmont was no longer serving Naples. According to the April 2, 1995 edition of the Official Airline Guide (OAG), six airlines were operating a combined total of 30 flights every weekday into the airport with nonstop service from Miami, Tampa, Orlando and Key West all flown with commuter turboprop or small piston engine prop aircraft. At this time, the OAG listed service into APF operated by American Eagle with the Short 360, Cape Air with Cessna aircraft, Continental Express (operated by GP Express Airlines) with the Beechcraft 1900, Delta Connection (operated by Comair (United States)) with Embraer EMB-120 Brasilia and Swearingen Metroliner aircraft, Gulfstream International with the Beechcraft 99 and USAir Express with the Beechcraft 1900. The airport experienced a rebound in traffic during the mid-1990s, with 173,000 passengers and seven airlines in 1995.

In 1997, American Eagle operating on behalf of American Airlines was operating seven nonstop Saab 340 turboprop flights a day from the American hub in Miami; however, passenger numbers dipped when American Eagle ceased scheduled service to Miami in 2001, and dipped even further following the September 11, 2001, attacks. In 2003, US Airways Express ceased its service on behalf of US Airways from Naples to Tampa; the airline had been operating up to five nonstop Beechcraft 1900 turboprop flights a day from Tampa during the late 1990s. Atlantic Southeast Airlines (ASA) operated Delta Connection on behalf of Delta Air Lines with flights between Naples and Atlanta from 2004 to 2007 with a revenue guarantee from the city, but ended the service after retiring its fleet of 30-seat turboprop aircraft, again leaving the airport without scheduled service. In 2005, Atlantic Southeast was operating Delta Connection nonstop service from Atlanta with Canadair CRJ-200 regional jets with three daily flights while Cape Air was operating four daily nonstop flights from both Key West and Miami with small Cessna prop aircraft with the latter service from Miami being operated on behalf of Continental Airlines as Continental Connection flights. Yellow Air Taxi previously operated flights to Fort Lauderdale and Key West, but the service was ended in December 2008. Elite Airways also began scheduled service to the airport in February 2016, with flights to Portland (ME), Newark, Vero Beach, and Melbourne (FL), but ended in March 2017 due to low passenger counts.

In December 2018, the airport authority changed the facility's name from Naples Municipal Airport to Naples Airport. They also changed the airport's logo to a more modern one.

== Facilities and aircraft ==
Naples Airport covers an area of 732 acres (296 ha) at an elevation of 8 feet (2.4 m) above mean sea level. It has two asphalt paved runways: 05/23 measuring 6,600 by 150 feet (2,012 by 46 m) and 14/32 measuring 5,000 by 100 ft (1,524 by 30 m). It also has one turf runway designated SW/NE which measures 1,850 by 100 ft (564 by 30 m).

For the 12-month period ending April 30, 2022, the airport had 113,137 aircraft operations, an average of 260 per day: 85.3% general aviation, 14.4% air taxi, 0.2% military and 0.1% airline. At that time, there were 304 aircraft based at this airport: 62.2% single-engine, 17.1% multi-engine, 15.1% jet and 5.6% helicopter.

The airport has two terminals: the North Road Terminal and the General Aviation Terminal. Charter airlines like ExecAir and NetJets and car rental agencies are located in the North Road Terminal. There is also a military museum with WWII artifacts and memorabilia. The car rental agencies offered are Hertz, Avis, Enterprise, Thrifty and Alamo. The General Aviation Terminal is a two-story terminal used for personal flights, and also houses car rental agencies.

== General aviation ==
- Velox Air Charter
- Clay Lacy Aviation
- Monarch Air Group

== Airlines and destinations ==
Airlines	Destinations
American Eagle	Charlotte (begins December 2, 2026)
JSX	Seasonal: White Plains

== Accidents and incidents ==
- On September 10, 1985, a Douglas DC-3 of the Collier Mosquito Control District crashed at East Naples while on approach to Naples Municipal Airport following an engine failure. The aircraft was on agricultural duties at the time. The two people on board the aircraft survived the accident.
- On June 20, 2005, a Cessna 182 Skylane departing Naples Municipal Airport entered an area of severe weather over the Gulf of Mexico. The aircraft was never recovered, with the crash resulting in one fatality.
- On February 9, 2024, Hop-A-Jet Flight 823 crashed on Interstate 75 while attempting to land at the airport. The pilots of the Bombardier Challenger 604 aircraft reported a dual engine failure while on final approach. The aircraft attempted an emergency landing on the highway but struck a vehicle and caught fire. Two of the five people aboard were killed in the accident.

== See also ==
- List of airports in Florida
