= Apalachicola Regional Airport =

Airport in Franklin County, Florida

Apalachicola Regional Airport (former Apalachicola AAF)
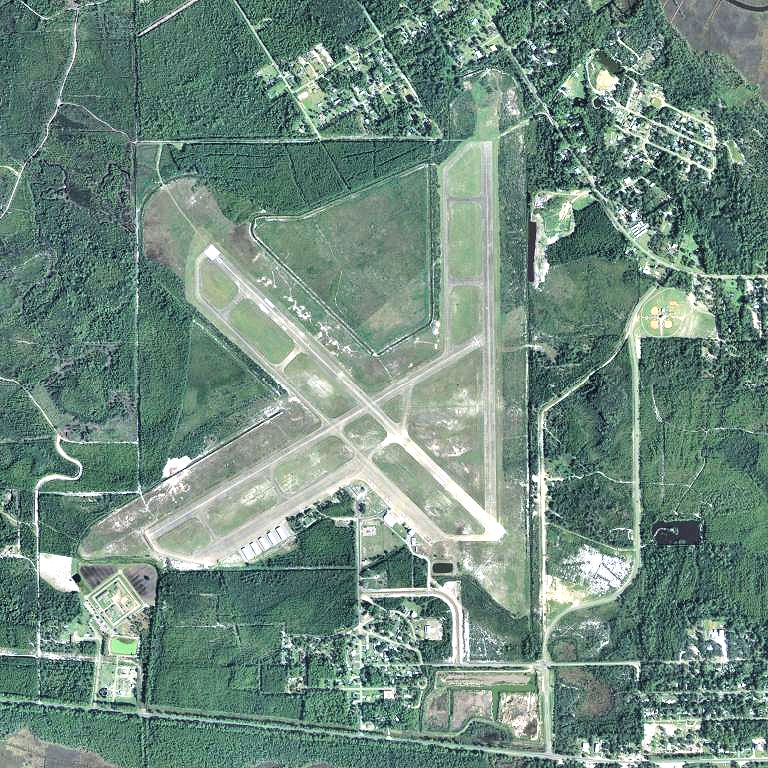
- USGS 2006 orthophoto
- IATA: AAF; ICAO: KAAF; FAA LID: AAF; WMO: 72220

Summary
- Airport type: Public
- Owner: Franklin County
- Serves: Apalachicola, Florida
- Elevation AMSL: 20 ft (6.1 m)
- Coordinates: 29°43′39″N 85°01′39″W

Map
- Location of airport in Florida AAF (the United States)

Runways
Direction	Length		Surface
Direction	ft	m	Surface
06/24	5,271	1,607	Concrete
14/32	5,425	1,654	Concrete
18/36	5,251	1,601	Concrete

Statistics (2018)
- Aircraft operations: 24,375
- Based aircraft: 10
- Source: Federal Aviation Administration

Apalachicola Regional Airport (IATA: AAF, ICAO: KAAF, FAA LID: AAF) is a county-owned, public-use airport located in unincorporated Franklin County, Florida, United States, two nautical miles (4 km) west of the central business district of Apalachicola. It is included in the National Plan of Integrated Airport Systems for 2011–2015, which categorized it as a general aviation facility. It was previously known as Apalachicola Municipal Airport. The airport supports general aviation activity in the area and provides service via a tenant fixed-base operator (FBO).

== History ==
The current airport was originally constructed in 1939 by the U.S. Army Air Corps. Expanded in February 1942, Apalachicola Army Air Field became a sub base of Tyndall Field, the present day Tyndall Air Force Base. Apalachicola AAF's mission was to support the operations of the Training Command Flexible Gunnery School under the 2136th Army Air Forces Base Unit, and as a sub-base and auxiliary airfield for Tyndall. The Army Airfield was inactivated at the end of World War II on September 30, 1945, and turned over to Army Corps of Engineers on February 2, 1947, as excess. Eventually discharged to the War Assets Administration (WAA), it was deeded to municipality of Apalachicola and became a civil airport.

On March 15, 1964, a pilot with the U.S. Navy's Flight Demonstration Squadron, the Blue Angels, was killed during an attempted emergency landing at Apalachicola Municipal Airport when his F-11A Tiger experienced engine difficulties while transiting from West Palm Beach, Florida, back to the Blue Angels' home base at NAS Pensacola, Florida. LT George L. Neale, USN, age 29, who flew in the Number Four slot position of the diamond formation, was returning from a demonstration at West Palm Beach with one other of the six team jets and an R5D Skymaster support plane when he radioed Tyndall Air Force Base, near Panama City, Florida, that he was declaring an emergency and requesting permission to land at Tyndall when he suffered engine mechanical problems south of Apalachicola. Spotting the Apalachicola Airport, he attempted a landing there, ejecting on final approach at 1115 hrs. as the fighter came down ~250 yards short of the runway. Although he cleared the airframe at ~150–200 feet altitude, his chute did not have sufficient time to deploy and he was killed. He was survived by his wife Donna, of Pensacola, Florida, and his mother, Mrs. Katherine Neale, of Avalon, Pennsylvania. Official Navy press reports at the time said that the cause of the mishap was being investigated.

== Facilities and aircraft ==
Apalachicola Regional Airport covers an area of 1,100 acres (445 ha) at an elevation of 20 feet (6 m) above mean sea level. It has three runways (06/24, 14/32, 18/36) each of which has a concrete surface: 6/24 is 5,271 feet x 150 feet, 14/32 is 5,425 x 150, and 18/36 is 5,251 x 150.

For the 12-month period ending April 3, 2018, the airport had 24,375 aircraft operations, an average of 67 per day: 95% general aviation, 5% air taxi, and <1% military. At that time there were 10 aircraft based at this airport: 10 single-engine.

== See also ==
- Florida World War II Army Airfields
- List of airports in Florida
- 75th Flying Training Wing (World War II)
