= Robert Jackson (cornerback) =

American football player (born 1993)

Profile
- Position: Cornerback

Personal information
- Born: December 8, 1993 (age 32); Fort Myers, Florida, U.S.
- Listed height: 6 ft 1 in (1.85 m)
- Listed weight: 202 lb (92 kg)

Career information
- High school: Lehigh (FL)
- College: UNLV
- NFL draft: 2018: undrafted

Career history
- Indianapolis Colts (2018)*; Houston Texans (2018)*; Cleveland Browns (2018–2020); Las Vegas Raiders (2021)*; Baltimore Ravens (2021)
- * Offseason or practice squad member only

Career NFL statistics
- Total tackles: 12
- Pass deflections: 1
- Stats at Pro Football Reference

Robert Jackson (born December 8, 1993) is an American football cornerback who is a free agent. He played college football at UNLV.

== Professional career ==
=== Indianapolis Colts ===
After going undrafted in the 2018 NFL draft, Jackson signed with the Indianapolis Colts on May 1, 2018. Jackson was waived with an injury designation by the Colts on September 1, 2018, and subsequently reverted to the Colts' injured reserve list. The Colts released Jackson from the injured reserve list with an injury settlement on October 4, 2018.

=== Houston Texans ===
Jackson was signed to the Houston Texans' practice squad on October 9, 2018. He was released by the Texans on October 16, 2018.

=== Cleveland Browns ===
Jackson was signed to the Cleveland Browns' practice squad on October 31, 2018. He was released by the Browns on December 13, 2018. The Browns re-signed Jackson to a futures contract on January 2, 2019. He remained with the team during the Browns' 2019 training camp, and was waived during final roster cuts on August 31, 2019. Jackson re-signed with the Browns to their practice squad on September 1, 2019. He was elevated to the Browns' active roster on September 20, 2019. He was placed on injured reserve on December 7, 2019, with an ankle injury.

Jackson was waived by the Browns on September 5, 2020. The Browns re-signed Jackson to their practice squad on September 6, 2020. He was elevated to the active roster on September 12, 2020, for the team's Week 1 matchup. Jackson reverted to the Browns' practice squad on September 14, 2020. He was elevated to the active roster for a second time on September 17, 2020, prior to the Browns' week 2 game, and reverted to the practice squad the following day. The Browns promoted Jackson to their active roster on October 14, 2020. On January 12, 2021, Jackson was placed on injured reserve. On February 11, 2021, Jackson was waived by the Browns. He re-signed with the Browns on February 20, 2021. He was waived on August 24, 2021.

=== Las Vegas Raiders ===
On September 1, 2021, Jackson was signed to the Las Vegas Raiders practice squad. He was released on October 13, 2021.

=== Baltimore Ravens ===
On December 1, 2021, Jackson was signed to the Baltimore Ravens practice squad. On December 5, 2021, Jackson was elevated to the Ravens' active roster in advance of the team's Week 13 loss to the Pittsburgh Steelers, He reverted to the practice squad after the game. He was again elevated to the active roster in advance of the team's Week 15 loss to the Green Bay Packers, and reverted back to the practice squad after the game. He signed a reserve/future contract with the Ravens on January 10, 2022. He was released on August 15, 2022.

=== NFL Career statistics ===
Legend
	Led the league
**Bold**	Career high

Year	Team	GP	GS	Tackles				Interceptions					Fumbles	
Year	Team	GP	GS	Comb	Total	Ast	Sack	PD	Int	Yds	Avg	TDs	FF	FR
2019	CLE	6	6	3	2	0	0.0	0	0	0	0.0	0	0	0
2020	CLE	10	10	6	5	0	0.0	1	0	0	0.0	0	0	0
2021	BAL	2	0	8	8	5	0.0	0	0	0	0.0	0	0	0
Total		18	16	17	15	5	0.0	1	0	0	0.0	0	0	0
Source: NFL.com
