= Wild Turkey Strand Preserve =

Protected land in Lee County, Florida, US

Coordinates: 26.5560°N 81.69271°W

Wild Turkey Strand Preserve is a 3,137-acre area of protected lands in Lee County, Florida. The preserve is off State Route south of Lehigh Acres. It includes part of the former Buckingham Army Airfield, a World War II-era training base.

The preserve includes flatwoods, cypress strand swamps, cypress dome swamps, freshwater marshes, wet prairies, and abandoned agricultural pasture. There is a 1.8-mile trail with boardwalks and interpretive signage. The preserve lands were acquired during the first decade of the 21st century.
