= Buckingham Army Air Field =

Former airfield in Lee County, Florida

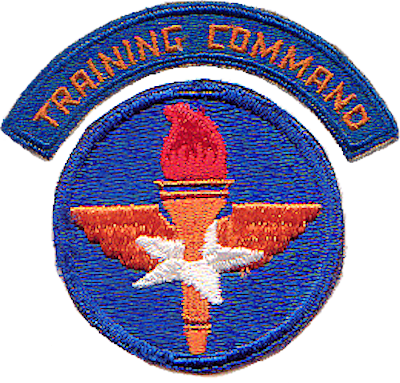
Buckingham Army Air Field
- Part of Army Air Forces Training Command
- Fort Myers, Florida
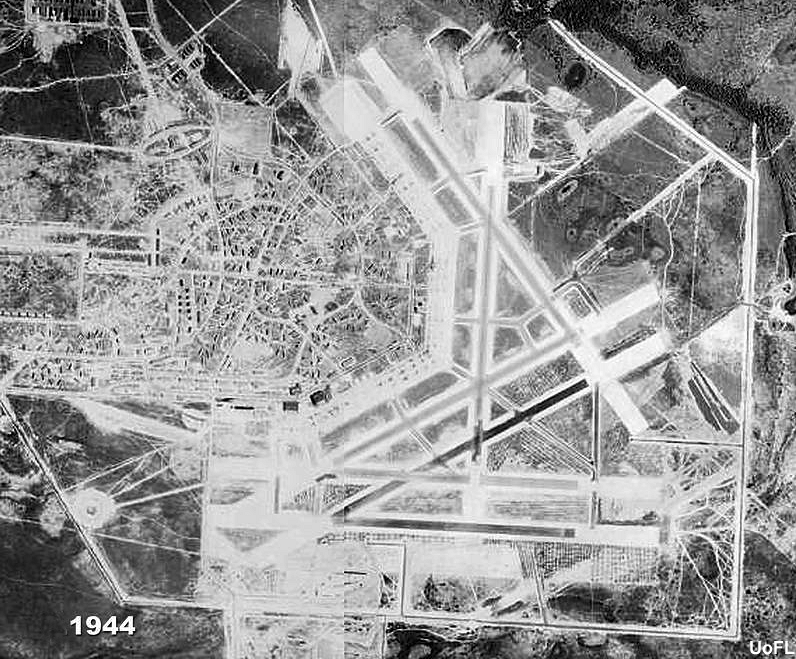
- Buckingham Army Air Field, Florida – 1944

Location
- Coordinates: 26°38′36″N 81°42′37″W

Site history
- Built: 1942
- Built by: United States Air Force
- In use: 1942–1945
- Battles/wars: World War II

Buckingham Army Air Field is an inactive United States Army Air Forces base, approximately 10 miles east of Fort Myers, Florida. It was active during World War II as an Army Air Forces Training Command airfield. It was closed on 30 September 1945, prior to the establishment of the United States Air Force as an independent service two years later in 1947. Part of the airfield is now in the Wild Turkey Strand Preserve.

Buckingham Army Air Field was a training base, established in 1942 under AAF Eastern Flying Training Command, and when active, was the largest airfield in the State of Florida.

Besides the gunnery students, Buckingham AAF was also the primary training center for gunnery instructors at the Army's other flexible gunnery schools, the term meaning that the aerial gunner had a flexible mount at the station or in the turret of the aircraft, rather than the fixed aerial gun of fighter aircraft.

== History ==
=== Origins ===
The field's beginnings was a land purchase in 1941 by a group of Fort Myers and Lee County, Florida officials, and then leased the land back to the War Department for the establishment of an Army Air Corps airfield. At the time of its purchase, the land was used for cattle grazing. The new base would create thousands of jobs, increase property values, and bring a business boom to the local economy. Construction of the airfield began in February 1942 at a cost of $10 million on a total of 7,000 acres (28 km^{2}) of swamp land, which had to be drained with an extensive system of newly constructed drainage canals, by itself an impressive engineering achievement. By mid-June 1942, construction of the airfield was underway and by August, almost 500 buildings were under construction.

The airfield was a large and expansive facility, and originally was constructed using the "eight star" layout parking ramp, capable of hundreds of aircraft. The airfield was initially constructed with three runways, as the base grew in size, it was expanded to six. It consisted of a single 5,000' N/S (00/18) runway; two parallel 5,000' NE/SW (05/22) runways; two parallel 5,000' E/W (09/27) runways, and a 5,000' NW/SE runway (14/32), initially all concrete, with numerous taxiways. Parts of the runways later had an asphalt surface.

For gunnery training there were 2 oval tracks of the Ground Moving Target Range, located to the west of the airfield, 26°38′32″N 081°44′13″W as well as nearby skeet ranges & trap ranges. In addition to the main base, Buckingham also operated Naples Army Air Field (Now Naples Municipal Airport) as an auxiliary landing field. In addition, two crash boat bases; one at Marco Island and the other on the Caloosahatchee River near the Gulf of Mexico were construed.

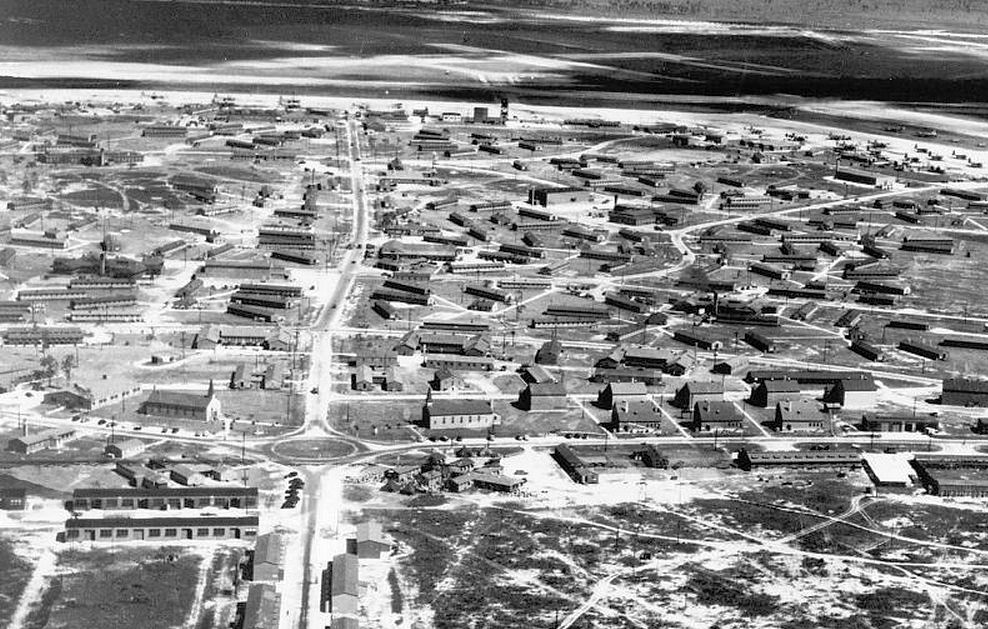
Some of the over 700 buildings of the station area at Buckingham Army Air Field, 1944. Today none remain

The ground support station was also very expansive, consisting of about seven hundred buildings based on standardized plans and architectural drawings, with the buildings designed to be the "cheapest, temporary character with structural stability only sufficient to meet the needs of the service which the structure is intended to fulfill during the period of its contemplated war use." To conserve critical materials, most facilities were constructed of wood, concrete, brick, gypsum board and concrete asbestos. Metal was sparsely used. Buckingham Field was designed to be nearly self-sufficient, with not only hangars, but barracks, warehouses, hospitals, dental clinics, dining halls, and maintenance shops were needed. There were libraries, social clubs for officers, and enlisted men, and stores to buy living necessities.

As the base was east of the developed area (at the time) of Fort Myers, a seven-mile-long railroad spur was constructed between the Seaboard Railroad depot in Fort Myers to Buckingham AAF. Buckingham even had its own switch engine to move railcars round The switch engine was powerful enough to move passenger cars with new students or freight cars filled with supplies from the depot to the base.

On 8 January 1943, the AAF Training Command constituted and activated the 75th Flying Training Wing (Flexible Gunnery) at Buckingham and assigned it to the AAF Eastern Flying Training Command. At its peak, Buckingham Field and its target ranges covered a total of 65,723 acres (265.97 km^{2}), and housed 16,000 men.

=== Flexible Gunnery School ===
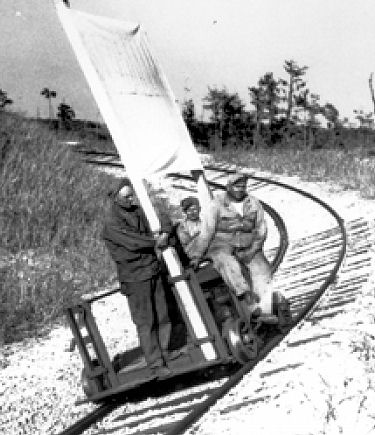
A Juda railway target car on Buckingham AAF is readied for flexible gunnery practice

By September 1942, enough construction was completed for Buckingham to begin its operational use, however the facilities were nowhere near complete. Such was the urgency by the Army Air Forces for trained aerial gunners.

Buckingham Field was one of eventually seven Flexible Gunnery Schools. There were no dedicated flexible gunnery training schools prior to World War II, and as combat aircraft production was ramping up around the country, there was a desperate need for qualified defensive gunners to man the B-17s, B-24s, B-26s and other aircraft. Also, flexible gunners were all enlisted personnel. The number of gunners varied by aircraft type, depending on the amount of defensive armament carried.

When the school opened, there was also no standardized program of instruction developed. There were broad-scale guidelines for training, but the specifics of training had yet to be developed. New lessons were being learned each day from the experiences of combat, primarily over the South Pacific where aerial combat with Japanese aircraft were occurring daily. In addition, training equipment was non-existent. The main areas of instruction were aircraft identification; .30 and .50 caliber machine gun assembly/disassembly; skeet shooting using shotguns from a range; skeet shooting from the bed of a moving truck and firing the various machine guns at a primitive range. Flying training was initially conducted using T-6 Texans over the Gulf of Mexico.

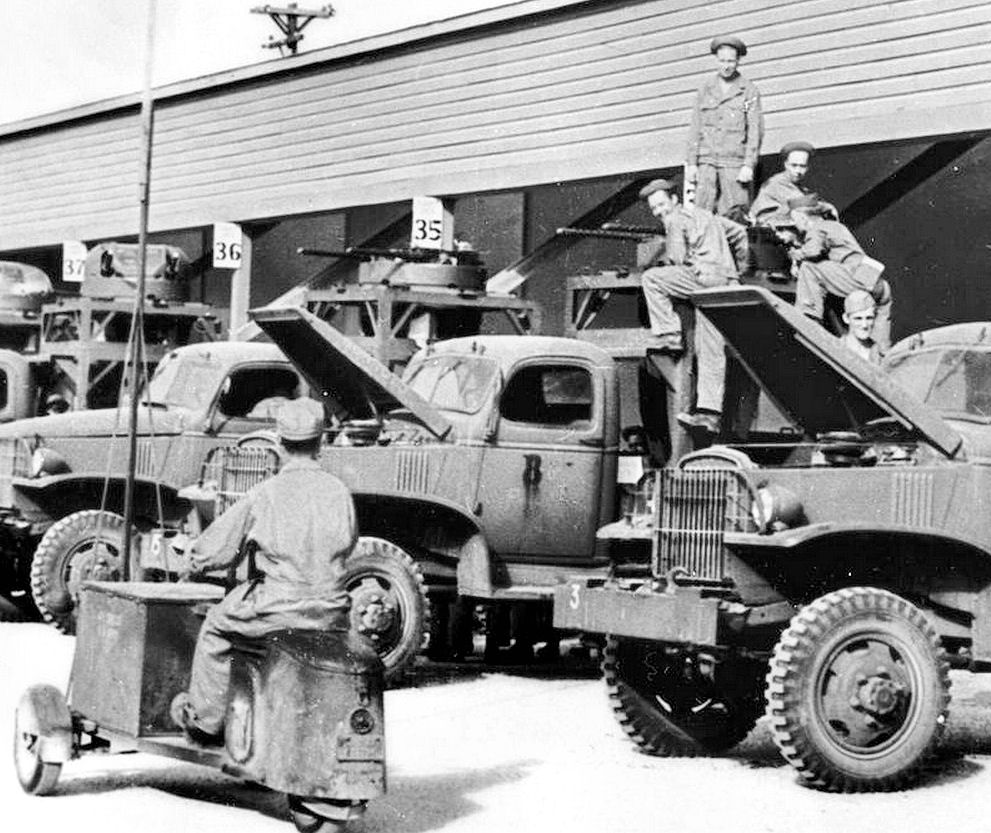
Photo of the motor pool showing E5 turret training trucks with mounted aircraft turrets used for training

By early 1943, Buckingham AAF had developed a five-week training course, consisting each day of close order drill, followed by several hours of classroom instruction and then time on the ranges each day. The day would end with calisthenics and PT. The first few weeks of training focused on weapons training, with the students expected to take them apart and put them back together in increasingly shorter amount of time. An instructor would usually cause something to go wrong with the weapons and it was the student's problem to identify the cause and fix it. .22 caliber shotguns were used in the initial phase of marksmanship training, then moving on to larger 12-gauge shotguns out on the ranges. Students would shoot from the moving truck at clay pigeons launched or thrown into the air. Aircraft identification was intensely studied along with theory of ballistics and how to estimate ranges of aircraft.

As proficiency grew, students were trained in the use of Martin, Bendix and other power turrets. Later, students were taken to an oval shaped course where a jeep pulled a moving training target. The student fired machine guns either flexibly mounted like a waist gun or turret mounted from another vehicle, also moving to simulate aerial combat.

The last week of training was where students were taken up in training aircraft and air-to-air gunnery was practiced against flying targets. The bullet tips were painted in various colors so hits on the target could be counted once the tow plane landed.

Upon graduation, the student would receive his silver gunner's wings and be promoted to the rank of Sergeant. After a brief leave, the newly minted gunner would then be assigned to a newly formed operational squadron being formed in the United States or be deployed overseas to a combat Air Force as replacement personnel.

=== Training Equipment and Aircraft ===
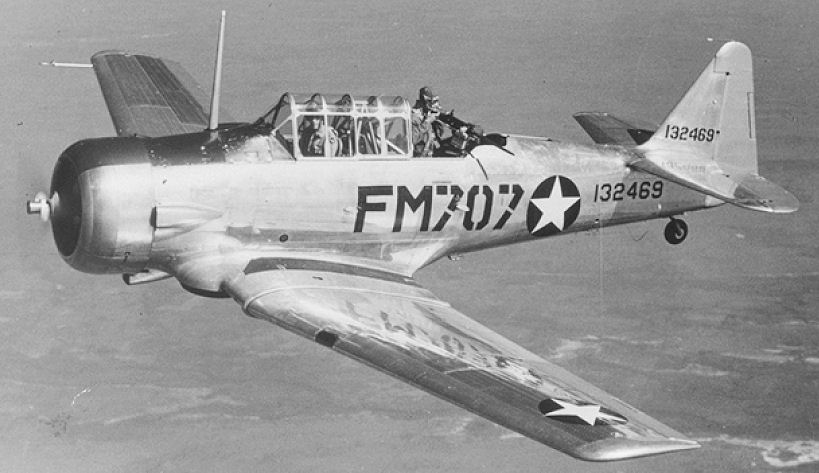
A gunnery student from Buckingham AAF practices air-to-air firing with a 30-caliber machine gun from the rear seat of a North American AT-6C-NT Texan, AAF Ser. No. 41-32469. The "FM" on the fuselage indicates this is a Buckingham AAF (Fort Myers) aircraft.

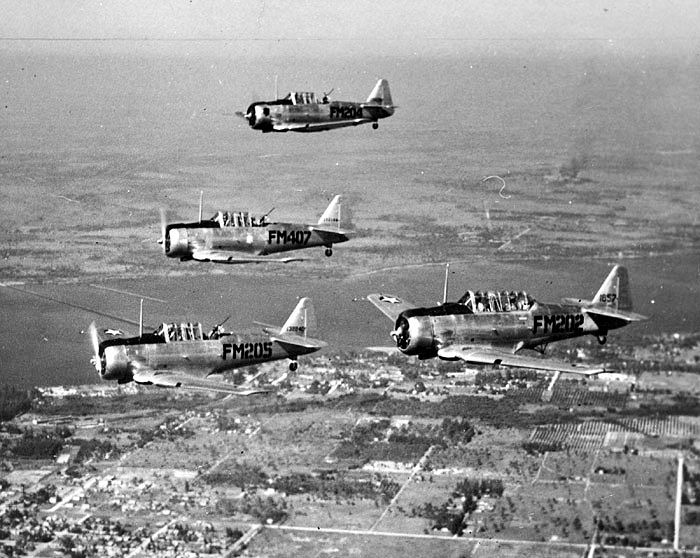
A formation of four AT-6 aircraft wing their way along the Caloosahatchee River above east Fort Myers to the Buckingham Flexible Gunnery School's range over the Gulf of Mexico (ca 1945). The plane on the right carries the tow target. The gunners shoot from the rear seat of the planes.

Training equipment was developed to simulate actual combat conditions. These were called "synthetic trainers" and there were three types.

Hunt Trainers were a range estimating device that used scale models of airplanes, coupled with mirrors to help the student learn how to estimate the distance from his weapon to the attacking aircraft. The model aircraft could be made to appear and move toward or away from the gunner. Also, since scale model aircraft were used, the gunner also learned aircraft identification. This was a very basic trainer and the first used at Buckingham.

Later, the Jam Handy Trainer, acquired from the Navy, was used. The Jam Handy used motion picture technology to project actual combat situations on a movie screen with sound effects that included engine noise. The attacking aircraft could be shown coming from several different angles at the trainee who was behind a mock machine gun. Training tested the skill in selecting the proper range to fire and the aim point of the weapon could be evaluated. If the trainee "fired" his weapon within the proper range, the sound of gunfire could be heard. The correct aim point was projected via a ring-sight image. Also a spot of light would be shown where the trainee was aiming.

The Waller Trainer was the most complex and expensive trainer used. It required five different motion picture projectors operating in an air-conditioned building, each one costing nearly $60,000. Buckingham was the first of the flexible gunnery schools to have the Waller. Like the Jam Handy, the Waller trained the student on range and aim points and up to four gunners could be trained simultaneously.

Other training devices used in this instruction was the manipulation trainer, which consisted of 12 towers arranged to resemble a formation of planes. The towers ranged in height from 10 to 40 feet, each equipped with 2 nose, 2 tail, 2 ring sighting, and 4 blister positions. As students in these positions faced simulated attacks from PT-13 and PT-17 aircraft, they "fired" camera guns at the attacking fighters.

Part of the training program was high-altitude training. This involved going into a sealed room with about 20 other trainees, and the air pressure in the room was reduced in stages, simulating the climb of the non-pressurized bombers in service at the time. Students learned quickly how to operate life support and oxygen equipment, with instructors assisting them to solve any problems. Often students became ill with the bends and others developed ear problems as the pressure in the room varied to simulate flying conditions.

The development of training target aircraft and specialized ammunition also increased the realisticness of the training. The idea was to have the students fire special bullets which had the same characteristics as a 30- or 50-caliber round but would splinter harmlessly on impact. Working with researchers at Duke University, the University of Michigan, and the Bakelite Corporation (one of the pioneering manufacturers of plastics), the Air Force came up with a frangible bullet that was weighted with powdered lead to give it the proper weight and density. The Douglas A-20 Havoc was initially used as a target trainer with additional aluminum armor added. The A-20 was found not to be ideal, as the gunners would largely face much more maneuverable single-engined fighter aircraft, and the Bell P-63 Kingcobra replaced it.

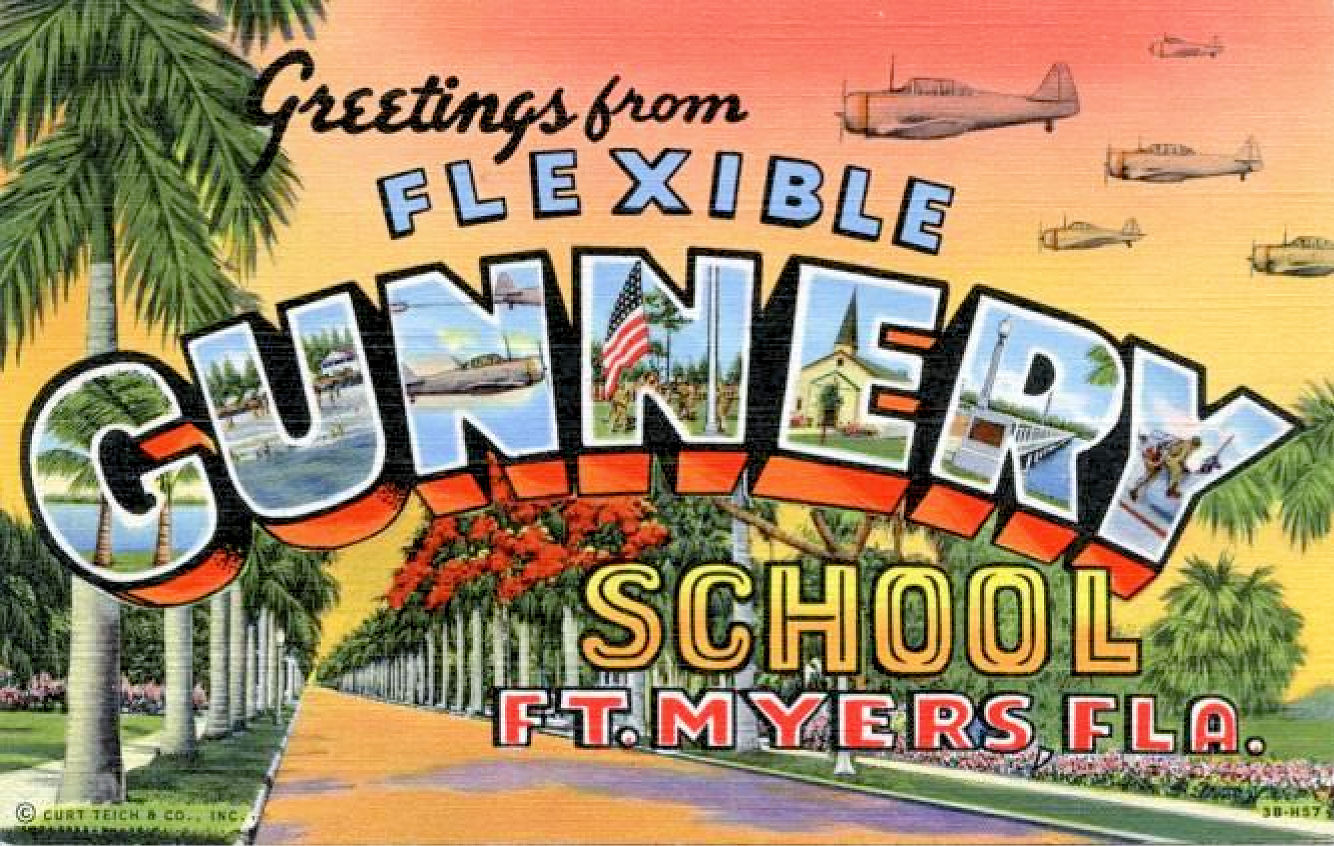
Postcard from Buckingham Army Airfield

The P-63 met the fighter plane criteria and was also available in quantity, as it was being used for lend-lease exports and was not used as a combat aircraft by the Air Force. The aerial target version of the aircraft was designated as the "RP-63 Pinball" and was painted a bright orange, re-fitted with 1" thick glass and carried more than a ton of armor covering the parts exposed to gunfire of the specialized bullets. Lights were used to record "hits" that flashed from the propeller hub, some also had lights that flashed from the wingtips, giving rise to the name "Pinball". Unfortunately, the number of hits registered by the recording devices in the aircraft was usually disappointingly small; whether because of misses or a failure of the recording mechanisms was unclear. Beginning in mid-1944 RP-63 Pinballs would fly attack profiles against bombers with student gunners before they were assigned to a combat unit. Eventually, over 300 RP-63s operated both from Buckingham and from the Naples Army Auxiliary Air Field.

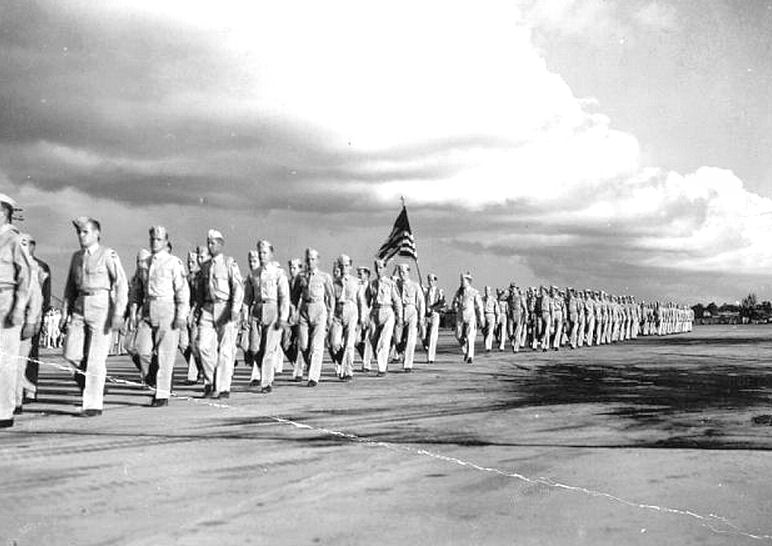
Graduating aerial gunners pass in review during their graduating ceremony at Buckingham Army Air Field. A base band was also playing at the ceremony. Reviews were also a way to impress visiting army brass, visiting politicians and other dignitaries.

B-24 Liberator aircraft were the primary aircraft used for the air-to-air gunnery phase of the training. The Liberator was not pressurized and had room in the fuselage to accommodate the trainees and their instructors. B-24s were modified with sealed bomb bays and could be used for both waist and turret training, carrying large amounts of ammunition and both the .30 and .50 caliber machine guns. A B-24 might have 12 student gunners each having 2,000 rounds of the special ammunition to fire at the RP-63 Pinballs.

The development of the B-29 Superfortress in 1943 with its remote-controlled defensive armament system caused a major problem for Training Command as no comparable trainers existed at Buckingham or the other Flexible Gunnery Schools. The introduction of the centralized gunner control system in the Boeing B-29 Superfortress where analog systems provided the necessary lead and tracking for the gunners which used sights that remotely operated the turrets. Targets could be handed off from one gunner's sight to another. Throughout 1944, B-29 gunners received practically the same training as those for other aircraft, but at the end of the year a decision was made to strip turrets off B-29s on the production line and install them in some existing B-24s to make them more like B-29s. It was not until June 1945 that B-29 aircraft arrived at Buckingham for training. That was two months before the end of World War II.

Other training aircraft used at Buckingham AAF were North American AT-6 Texans; Lockheed AT-18 Hudsons; Martin AT-23 Marauders; Lockheed RB-24 Venturas; Bell P-39 Airacobras, and some B-17 Flying Fortresses.

=== Closure ===
As the war began drawing to an end in Europe, and later in the summer of 1945 in the Pacific, the number of trainees and the level of activity at the base was reduced rapidly. With the Japanese surrender and the end of World War II most of the temporary training bases such as Buckingham Field were put on inactive status and eventually closed.

Training Command began the process of shutting down training activities completely, the field receiving notice in early September 1945 that it would revert to inactive status at the end of the month. During its operational lifetime, it graduated almost 48,000 aerial gunners.

Local officials made efforts to keep the base open as a permanent facility after the war as a training base, but demobilization was in full swing and the Army Air Forces had no need for Buckingham, or the money to operate it. Also, advancements in technology with the B-29, and the gun-laying radar that was under development with the tail cannons of the then-prototype B-36 Peacemaker made flexible gunnery training largely obsolete.

=== Lehigh Acres ===
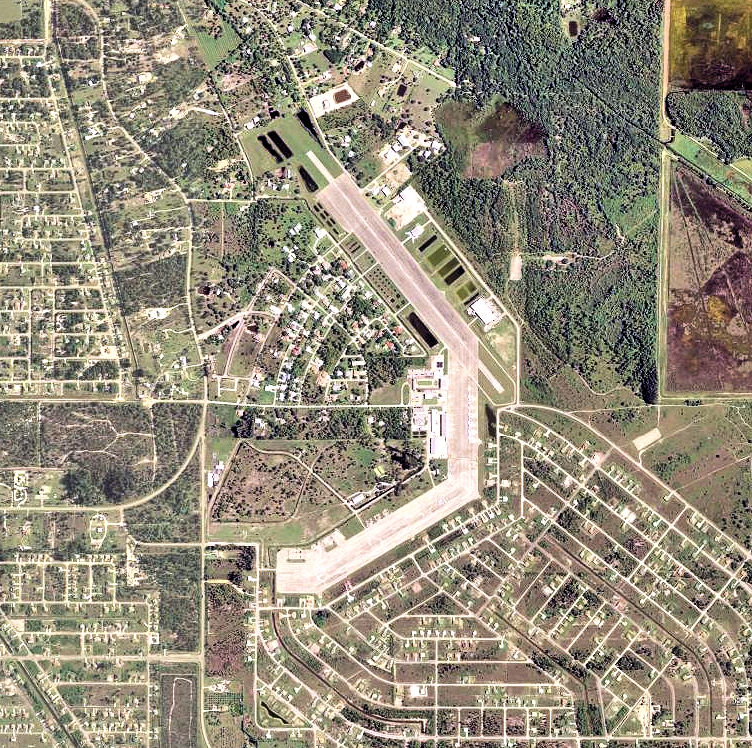
Buckingham Field Airport, 2006. The streets of Lehigh Acres dominate the photo

After the war, the barracks at Buckingham were briefly used as the Edison College, but this closed in 1948, and most of the buildings of the original base were subsequently removed over time.

In the 1950s, the abandoned Buckingham AAF was acquired by a marketing tycoon Lee Ratner, who was purchasing most of the undeveloped land east of Fort Myers. Working closely with his friend and marketing protégé Gerald Gould, Ratner launched one of the largest land schemes in Florida history, Lehigh Acres. A huge street grid was laid out and constructed and over 152,000 quarter acre (1,000 m²) and half-acre (2,000 m²) lots for housing, along over eleven thousand miles of roads. Strips of land along major thoroughfares, such as Homestead Road and Lee Boulevard, were set aside for commerce. After the war, thousands of surviving veterans of combat that trained at Buckingham AAF returned to Southwest Florida later in life to live. Many went on to become local leaders, and their memories of training at Fort Myers during the war brought a unique aspect to the community.

== Current status ==
Today, the large aircraft parking ramp of Buckingham Army Air Field remains the most visible remnant of the World War II training base. The runways of the old airfield were torn up and removed, the parking ramp being retained as Buckingham Field Airport with two small runways being laid out on the huge apron.

Most wartime buildings are long gone and the airfield is indistinguishable from the street grid and scattered homes that were built over them during the 1950s and 1960s. Streets and homes of Lehigh Acres have overlaid much of the station area; Jungle vegetation growth has reclaimed most of the rest and along the accessible abandoned streets in it the occasional foundation and parts of abandoned buildings and the skeet range area can be found. Pieces of the millions of clay skeet targets can be found easily, and the oval tracks of the Ground Moving Target Range still exist. The remains of the base swimming pool as the foundations of the Waller trainers remain, and to this day, spent bullets, dog tags, old coins and other mementos of World War II are still found in the area.

The civil airport is used for some fixed wing aircraft as well as the Lee County Mosquito Control District as a base of operations for its aircraft and helicopters. Some old wartime hangar foundations remain along the interior of the former parking ramp.

== See also ==
- Florida World War II Army Airfields
- 75th Flying Training Wing (World War II)
