= 75th Flying Training Wing (U.S. Army Air Forces) =

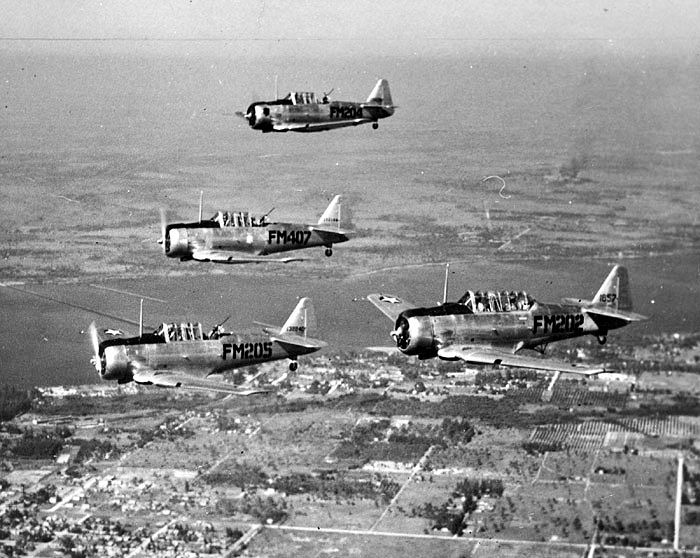
- AT-6C-NT Texan trainers from Buckingham AAF flying in formation. AT-6s were used as target towing aircraft for flexible gunnery training.
- Active: 1943–1946
- Country: United States
- Branch: United States Army Air Forces
- Role: Command of flying training units
- Engagements: World War II: World War II American Theater

The 75th Flying Training Wing (Note: There is no lineage connection between this wing and the United States Air Force 75th Air Base Wing, which was established on 5 February 1942 as the 75th Observation Group at Ellington Field, Texas.) was a flying training wing of the United States Army Air Forces. At the time, a wing controlled several multi-squadron groups. It was last assigned to the Army Air Forces Flying Training Command, and was disbanded on 15 June 1946 at Buckingham Army Air Field, Florida.

== History ==
The wing was a World War II command and control organization, initially part of Eastern Flying Training Command. The mission of the wing was to train aerial gunners. Fixed gunnery training for air cadet pilots was carried out at Eglin Field, while flexible gunnery training for enlisted gunners was carried out both at Tyndall Field in northern Florida and Buckingham Army Air Field in Southwest Florida. As the men graduated from flexible gunnery school, they were assigned to combat crews either forming in the United States or as replacements to overseas combat units. The school at Buckingham was the central school for training instructors for flexible gunnery until June 1944, when it moved to Laredo Army Air Field. Buckingham was also home to a psychological research detachment that studied psychological problems unique to aerial gunners and determined criteria for selection and training of gunners.

As training requirements changed during the war, schools were activated and inactivated or transferred to meet those requirements.

== Lineage ==
- Established as the 75th Flying Training Wing (Flexible Gunnery), on 14 August 1943

Activated on 25 August 1943
Disbanded on 16 June 1946.

=== Assignments ===
- Army Air Forces Eastern Flying Training Command, 25 August 1943
- AAF Western Flying Training Command, 15 December 1945 – 16 June 1946

=== Components ===
Schools (Note: Unless otherwise stated, components were stationed with wing headquarters at Buckingham Army Air Field.)

- Central Flexible Gunnery Instructor School (later AAF Flexible Gunnery School), Buckingham Army Air Field, 25 August 43 – c. 1 October 1945
- AAF Flexible Gunnery School, Tyndall Field. 25 August 1943 – unknown (Note: The Tyndall school remained active until January 1946, but may have been reassigned.)
- AAF Single Engine Gunnery School, Eglin Field, 25 August 1943 – c. 31 March 1944

Units

- Psychological Research Unit # 11, 1 October 1943 – c. 31 March 1944
- 2106th AAF Base Unit (75th Flying Training Wing), 1 May 1944 – 16 June 1946
- 2117th AAF Base Unit (Flexible Gunnery), 1 May 1944 – c. 1 October 1945 (Buckingham Army Air Field AT-6, AT-18, BT-13, B-24)
- 2119th AAF Base Unit (Sub-Post), 1 May 1944 – c. 1 May 1945 (Naples Army Air Field)
- 2135th AAF Base Unit (Flexible Gunnery School), 1 May 1944 – unknown (Tyndall Field)
- 2136th AAF Base Unit (Sub-Post) 1 May 1944 – c. 1 October 45 (Apalachicola Army Air Field), Florida AT-6, AT-18, BT-13)

Groups

- 1st Single Engine Gunnery Training Group, 25 August 1943 – 1 April 1944 (Eglin Field)
- 37th Flexible Gunnery Training Group, 25 August 1943 – 31 March 1944
- 37th Flexible Gunnery Training Group (Provisional), 31 March 1944 – 30 April 1944
- 38th Flexible Gunnery Training Group, 25 August 1943 – 30 April 1944
- 39th Flexible Gunnery Training Group, 31 March 1944 – 30 April 1944 (Tyndall Field)
- 40th Flexible Gunnery Training Group, 31 March 1944 – 30 April 1944 (Tyndall Field)

Squadrons

- 714th Flexible Gunnery Training Squadron, c. 25 August 1943 – 30 April 1944 (Naples Army Air Field)
- 915th Flexible Gunnery Training Squadron, c. 25 August 1943 – 30 April 1944 (Apalachicola Army Air Field)

Detachments

- Psychological Research Detachment (Gunnery), 25 August 1943 – 1 October 1943

=== Training aircraft ===
The schools of the wing flew two types of aircraft, gunnery trainers and gunnery targets.

- The trainer used for fixed gunnery training for pilots was the North American AT-6 Texan.
- The trainers used for flexible gunnery training for aerial gunners were the AT-18 Hudson and non-combat rated B-24 Liberators.
- Aerial gunnery target tow planes were Vultee BT-13s.
- Non-combat rated P-40s, P-39s and P-63s, modified for aerial targets, were also used.

=== Stations ===
- Buckingham Army Air Field, Florida, 25 August 1943 – 16 June 1946
