= Hop-A-Jet Flight 823 =

2024 aviation accident in Florida

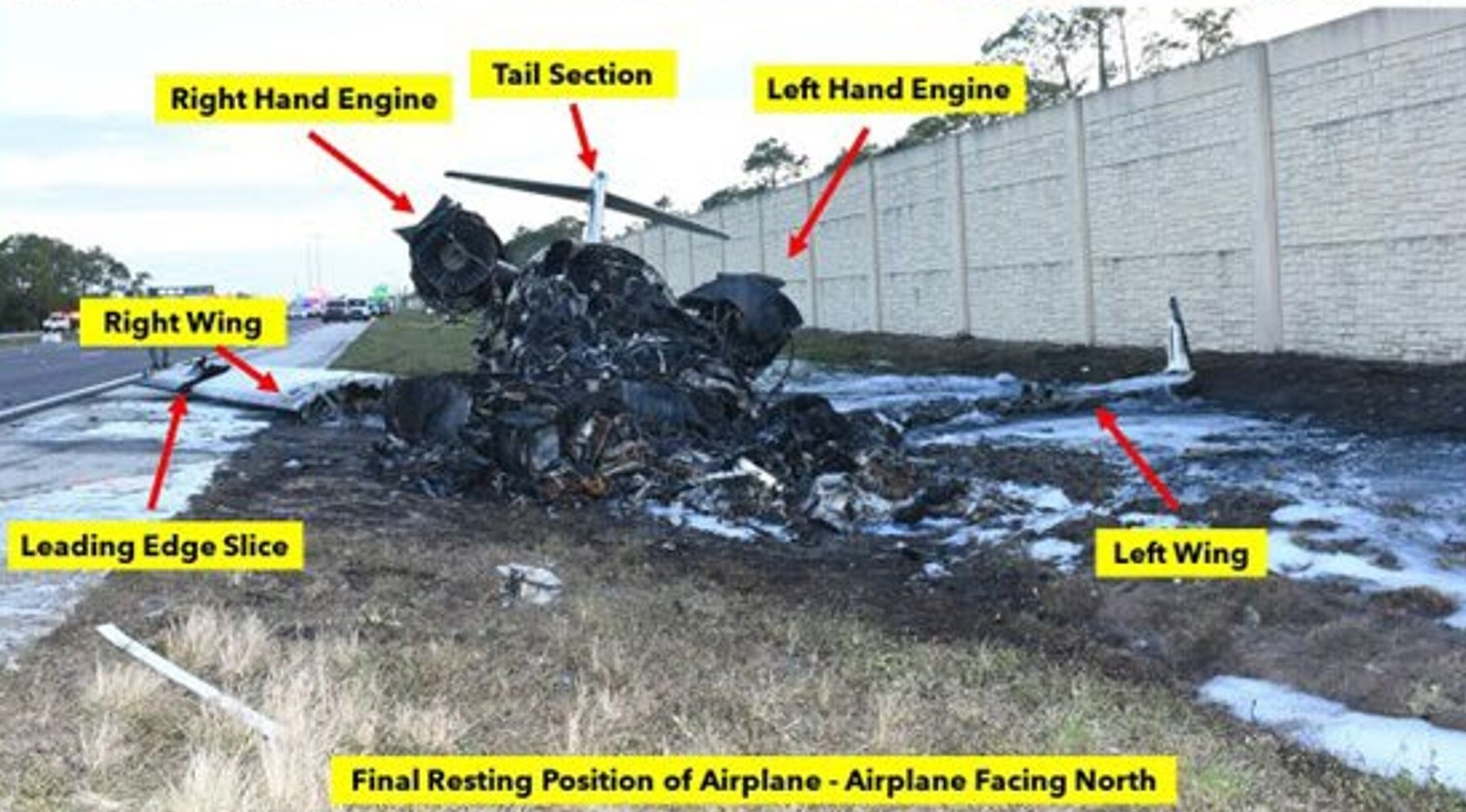
- Wreckage of the aircraft

Accident
- Date: February 9, 2024
- Summary: Dual engine failure due to compressor corrosion
- Site: Interstate 75, near Naples Airport, Naples, Florida, United States; 26°11′33″N 81°44′10″W
- Total fatalities: 2
- Total injuries: 4

Aircraft
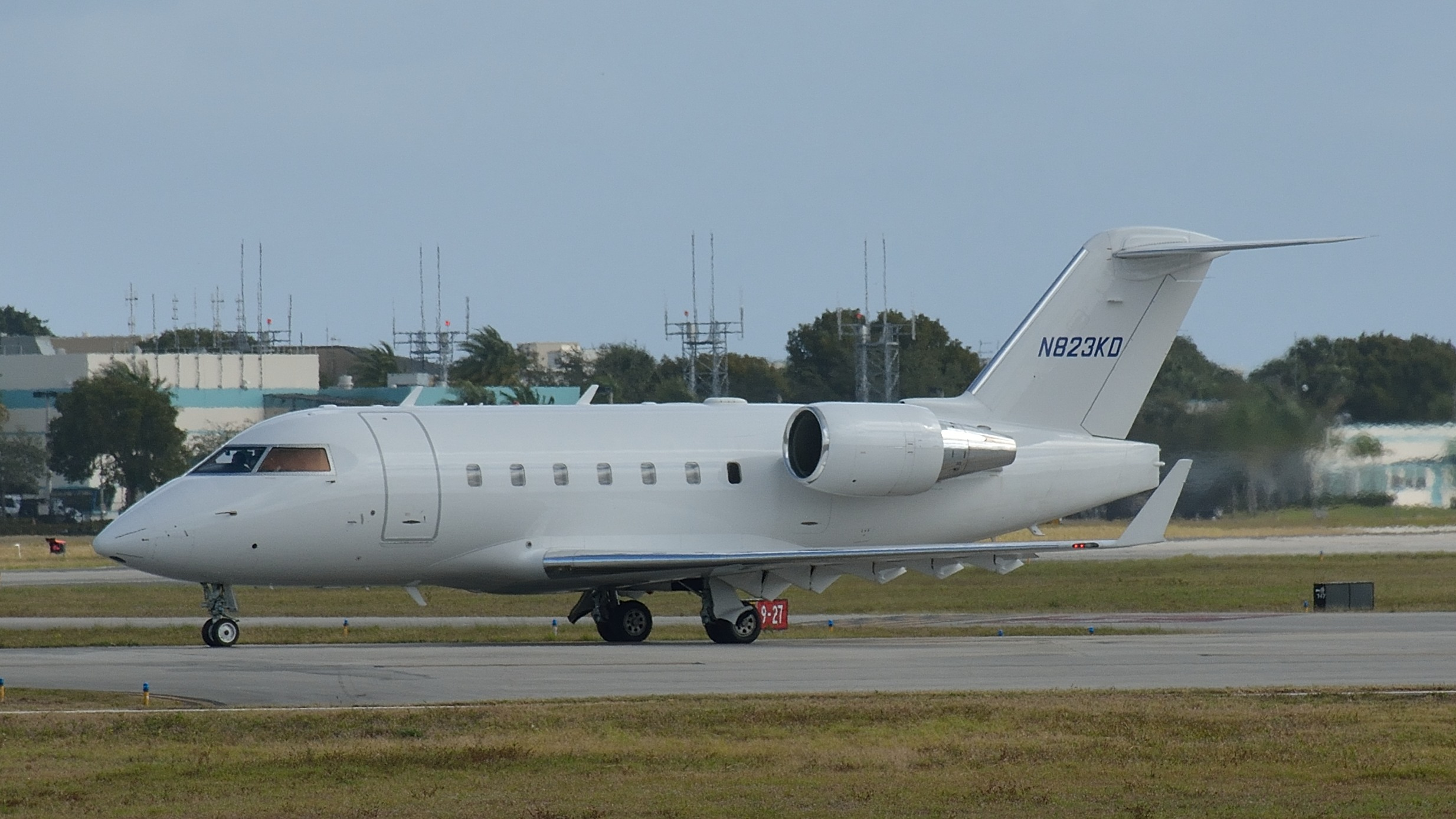
- N823KD, the aircraft involved in the accident, pictured in 2023
- Aircraft type: Bombardier Challenger 604
- Operator: Hop-A-Jet
- ICAO flight No.: HPJ823
- Call sign: HOP-A-JET 823
- Registration: N823KD
- Flight origin: Ohio State University Airport, Columbus, Ohio, United States
- Destination: Naples Airport, Naples, Florida, United States
- Occupants: 5
- Passengers: 2
- Crew: 3
- Fatalities: 2
- Injuries: 3
- Survivors: 3

Ground casualties
- Ground injuries: 1

Hop-A-Jet Flight 823 was a chartered U.S. domestic flight operated by Hop-A-Jet from Ohio State University Airport in Columbus, Ohio, to Naples Airport in Naples, Florida. Shortly before landing on February 9, 2024, the pilots reported a dual engine failure and attempted to land on Interstate 75. The aircraft, a Bombardier Challenger 604, with twin General Electric CF34-3B engines, was destroyed and consumed by a post-crash fire. Both pilots were killed, but the two passengers and the sole flight attendant on board survived.

== Background ==
=== Aircraft ===
The aircraft involved was a Bombardier Challenger 604 with manufacturer's serial number 5584 and registered as N823KD. The aircraft was built in 2004 and could carry up to 12 passengers. It was outfitted with two CF34-3B engines, manufactured by GE. The engines were installed new onto the aircraft on May 14, 2004. The Number 1 engine was Serial Number 950105, and the Number 2 engine was Serial Number 950106.

At the time of the accident, the aircraft was owned by East Shore Aviation LLC and was operated by Ace Aviation Services, doing business as Hop-A-Jet Worldwide Jet Charter, a private jet travel company based in Fort Lauderdale, Florida. The airplane's most recent continuous airworthiness inspection was completed on January 5, 2024, at which time the aircraft had accumulated 9,763 total hours of operation.

=== Crew ===
The aircraft was under the command of Captain Edward Daniel Murphy (50) and First Officer Ian Frederick Hofmann (65). The captain had accrued 10,525 total hours of flight experience, of which 2,808 hours were in the Bombardier Challenger 600 series. The first officer had accrued 24,618 total hours of flight experience, of which 138 hours were in the Bombardier Challenger 600 series.

== Accident ==
Dashcam footage of the accident

As the plane approached Naples Airport, the pilots radioed to air traffic controllers that both engines had failed, later adding that they would not be able to make it to the runway. The pilots attempted to land on Interstate 75 near mile marker 107. As the aircraft approached the road surface, it collided with a Chevrolet Silverado pickup truck and a Nissan Armada SUV, erupted in flames, and came to rest against a concrete wall at the side of the southbound lanes. Both pilots were killed, but the two passengers and flight attendant on board survived. The flight attendant was able to help the passengers evacuate through the baggage compartment door in the tail section of the airplane. The driver of the pickup truck, a 48-year-old Naples man, suffered minor injuries and was taken to a local hospital. The aircraft was destroyed by the post-crash fire.

=== Flight data recorder timeline ===
After a preliminary review of the data recovered from the airplane's flight data recorder, the NTSB provided the following timeline of key events:

Times in EST, February 9, 2024

- 3:08 p.m. – The Naples Airport tower controller cleared the flight to land on runway 23. According to Automatic Dependent Surveillance–Broadcast (ADS–B) track data, the airplane was about 6.5 miles (5.6 nmi; 10.5 km) north of the airport at an altitude of about 2,000 feet (610 m) and traveling at 166 knots (307 km/h; 191 mph).
- 3:09:33 p.m. – "L ENGINE OIL PRESSURE" master warning activates, indicating the oil pressure in the left engine is critically low.
- 3:09:34 p.m. – "R ENGINE OIL PRESSURE" master warning activates, indicating the oil pressure in the right engine is critically low. The system alerted pilots of these two warnings with the illumination of a red "Master Warning" light, a red message on the engine-indicating and crew-alerting system and a triple chime voice advisory ("Engine oil").
- 3:09:40 p.m. – "ENGINE" master warning activates, indicating an abnormal condition in the fan rotor, compressor rotor, or inter-turbine temperature.
- 3:10:05 p.m. – The crew radios the tower controller, "…lost both engines… emergency… making an emergency landing." The tower controller acknowledged the call and cleared the airplane to land. The aircraft was at an altitude of about 1,000 feet (300 m) and traveling at 122 knots (140 mph; 226 km/h).
- 3:10:12 p.m. – The crew replies to the tower controller, "We are cleared to land but we are not going to make the runway… ah… we have lost both engines." The aircraft was at an altitude of about 900 feet (270 m) and traveling at 115 knots (213 km/h; 132 mph). There were no further transmissions from the flight crew.
- 3:10:47 p.m. – ADS–B track data ends directly over Interstate 75.

== Investigation ==
The National Transportation Safety Board (NTSB) conducted an investigation into the accident. The Federal Aviation Administration (FAA), GE Aerospace, Hop-A-Jet Worldwide Jet Charter, Bombardier Inc. and the Transportation Safety Board of Canada are providing support as members of the investigation party.

The southbound lanes of Interstate 75 remained closed until Sunday, February 11, as crews examined the wreckage. Before the road was reopened, the wreckage was moved to a secure facility in Jacksonville for additional evaluation. The agency said it would also send the flight data recorder and cockpit voice recorder to agency headquarters in Washington, D.C.

=== NTSB preliminary report ===
On May 8, 2025, the NTSB released a factual report on the accident. The NTSB reviewed flight data, maintenance/inspection records, engine components, crew qualifications, and operational factors as core components of the investigation. The report stated that there was a non-recoverable dual-rotor compressor stall resulting from corrosion of the variable guide vane (“VGV”) systems of the CF34-3B engines powering the aircraft. This resulted in a loss of usable thrust as the pilots entered their landing configuration.

=== Aircraft maintenance ===
The preliminary NTSB report noted that the aircraft had experienced dual hung-starts in January 2024, approximately two weeks before the accident. The report showed that Hop-A-Jet's maintenance provider followed the manufacturer’s troubleshooting guidance, replacing air filters and taking other actions. Because the engines restarted and ran successfully, the maintenance procedure was curtailed prior to reaching step 22, Maintenance Practice 68, which would have involved a borescope inspection that could have revealed hidden corrosion inside the engine. With concurrence from the engine manufacturer, the airplane was returned to service and operated without issues for the next 25 days until the accident.

=== Engine maintenance history ===
In March 2019, the NTSB report states that the aircraft underwent a 3,200-hour inspection, which included a borescope of both engines. Aircraft maintenance records showed the borescope revealed evidence of corrosion on the compressor cases surrounding the bushing bore holes of the VGV System. Neither the engine logbook entries, the TES report, nor Bombardier’s report mentions the existence of corrosion, according to the NTSB.

In November 2020, the aircraft was given a 192-month inspection by Duncan Aviation, prior to an expected sale in March 2021. The inspection included borescopes of both engines. The NTSB report states that the prepurchase inspection revealed evidence of corrosion on the compressor cases surrounding the bushing bore holes of the VGV System, though this was not recorded in the aircraft’s logbooks.

=== Other CF34 engine incidents ===
The NTSB report showed that in 2021, prior to the Hop-A-Jet accident, GE issued a “category 1” service bulletin—the highest level possible—following an incident with a variant of CF34 engines typically used for commercial regional jets. The FAA subsequently issued an Emergency Airworthiness Directive for mainline commercial carriers for the CF34-8. This directive did not include operators of business jets equipped with CF34-3B engines.

=== Final report ===
The NTSB released its final investigation report on April 23, 2026. In the report, the NTSB stated that the probable cause of the crash was due to the corrosion of both engines' variable geometry (VG) system components. The corrosion led to the engines running in an off-schedule position, leading to near-simultaneous sub-idle rotating compressor stalls which led to the loss of thrust in both engines.

The report also revealed that the aircraft was commonly stored in salty air conditions commonly associated with marine climates. 25 days before the accident occurred, the engines experienced a "hung start" condition, where the engines experience abnormally slow acceleration. This facilitated a pressure check of the VG system, though the next day, however, both engines started normally, so the check was not performed - which led to the corrosion not being detected - and the aircraft was returned to service. Following this event, 33 flights were recorded without incident. General Electric issued an updated version of the check in response to the accident investigation. Two minutes before the crash, both engines lost oil pressure, leading to both engines failing.

== Aftermath ==
=== Lawsuit ===
In September and October 2025, Hop-A-Jet Worldwide Jet Charter and affiliated companies filed a multi-count lawsuit against General Electric, Bombardier Aerospace, Learjet, and several other aviation service providers in the U.S. District Court for the Southern District of Florida in relation to the accident. The lawsuit sought damages for the loss of the aircraft, economic losses, and industry-wide safety reforms.

=== Recognition ===
In October 2024, the flight attendant aboard Flight 823, Sydney Bosmans, received recognition from the National Business Aviation Association (NBAA) for her actions in evacuating the passengers after the crash, which were credited with saving lives.

== See also ==
- 2024 Orbic Air Eurocopter EC130 crash, a helicopter crash in California which occurred on the same date
