= Yellow Air Taxi =

IATA	ICAO	Call sign
Y0	EMJ	LIGHT HOUSE
- Founded: 2003
- Hubs: Fort Lauderdale – Hollywood International Airport
- Fleet size: 1
- Destinations: 4
- Parent company: Friendship Airways
- Headquarters: Fort Lauderdale, Florida
- Key people: Christopher Behnam (CEO)

Yellow Air Taxi (a marketing name of Friendship Airways) was an air taxi airline based in Fort Lauderdale, Florida. It operated on-demand passenger services in the Southeast, Florida, the Caribbean and, the Bahamas. YAT grew from a small operation out of Pompano Beach to a fleet of four Cessna 402Cs, all painted in yellow with a white/black checkerboard tail. The carrier had some issues with the US DOT, bordering on offering scheduled service as a charter airline. Once legal to fly more than four flights a week, YAT expanded to Naples & Key West, along with offering three flights a day to Marsh Harbour and Treasure Cay from Ft. Lauderdale. Miami service was attempted in 2009.

YAT started being affected by the high-seasonality of both the Florida Keys and Bahamas and the carrier relinquished their scheduled authority in 2009. Yellow Air Taxi has since gone out of business. On February 18, 2011, an involuntary petition for liquidation under Chapter 7 was filed against Friendship Airways Inc.

== Destinations ==
=== Florida ===
- Fort Lauderdale
- Tampa

== Previous destinations ==
- Key West International Airport
- Naples Municipal Airport
- Marsh Harbour International Airport
- Bimini
- Treasure Cay
- North Eleuthera international Airport
- Miami International Airport

== Fleet ==
The Yellow Air Taxi fleet consists of the following aircraft as of July 2010:

Yellow Air Taxi Fleet
Aircraft	Total	Passengers (Economy)	Routes	Notes
Cessna 402C	1	9	All	Twin propeller plane with one pilot. All painted yellow with black and white checker board design on the tail.
