= Lehigh Acres, Florida =

Census-designated place in Florida

- Census-designated place
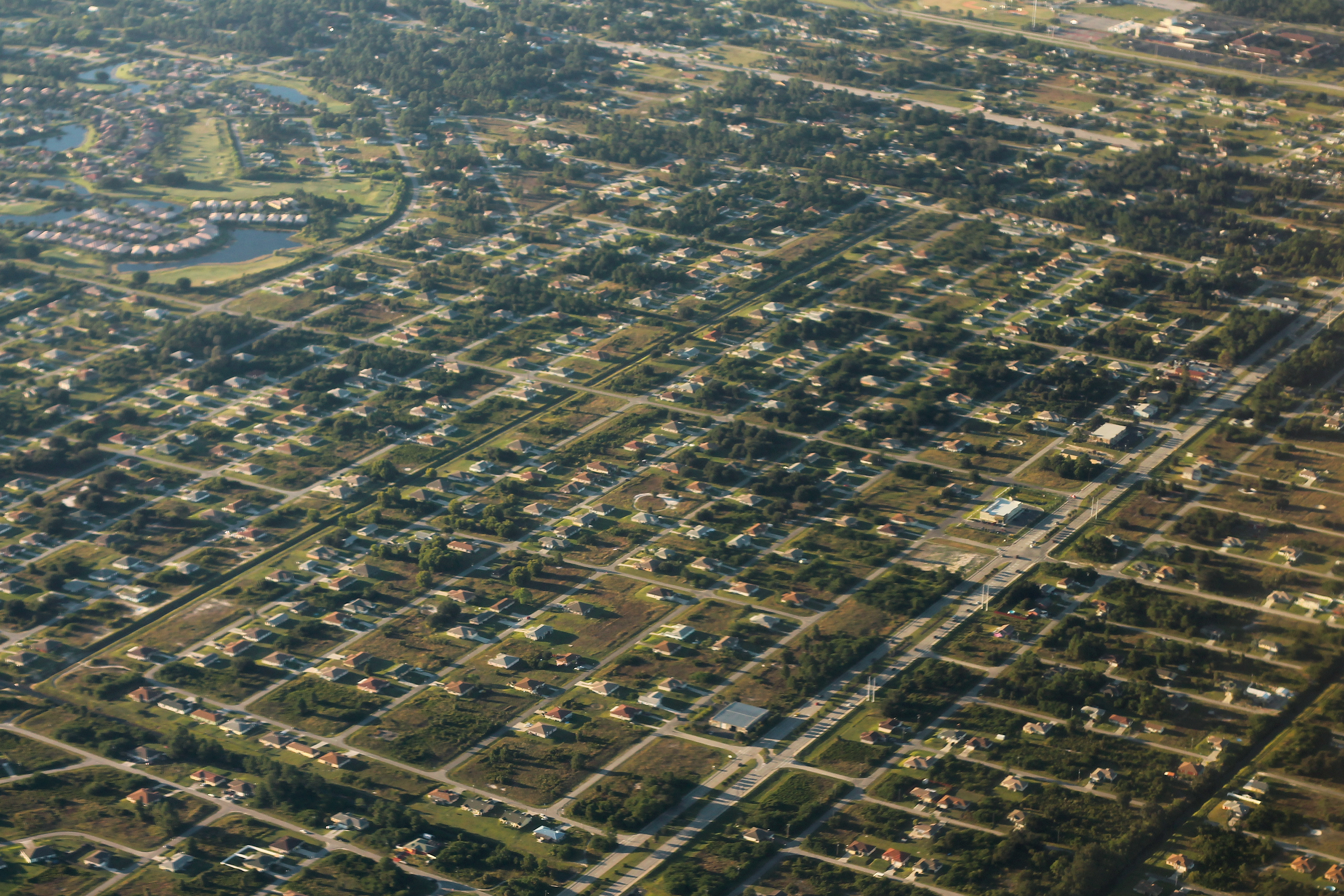
- Aerial view of Lehigh Acres

- Location within Lee County, Florida
- Coordinates: 26°36′30″N 81°38′21″W
- Country: United States
- State: Florida
- County: Lee
- Settled: 1954

Area
  - Total: 94.21 sq mi (244.00 km^{2})
  - Land: 92.70 sq mi (240.08 km^{2})
  - Water: 1.51 sq mi (3.92 km^{2}) 1.14%
- Elevation: 23 ft (7.0 m)

Population (2020)
  - Total: 114,287
  - Density: 1,232.9/sq mi (476.04/km^{2})
- Time zone: UTC-5 (Eastern (EST))
  - Summer (DST): UTC-4 (EDT)
- ZIP codes: 33900-33999
- Area code: 239
- FIPS code: 12-39925
- GNIS feature ID: 2403226

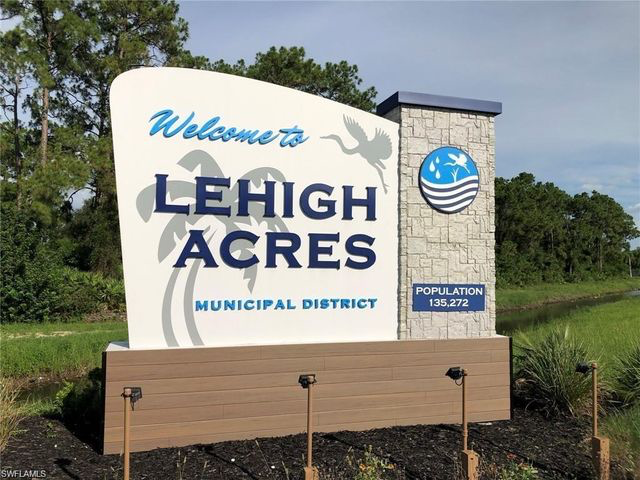
Lehigh welcome sign

Lehigh Acres is a census-designated place (CDP) in Lee County, Florida, United States. As of the 2020 Census the population was 114,287, up from 86,784 at the 2010 census. Lehigh Acres is part of the Cape Coral-Fort Myers, Florida Metropolitan Statistical Area. It is one of the fastest growing communities in Lee County.

== Geography ==
Lehigh Acres is located in eastern Lee County. It is bordered to the north by Alva, to the northwest by Buckingham, and to the southwest by Gateway, all unincorporated. It is bordered on the west by the city of Fort Myers, the Lee county seat, and extends east to the Hendry County line.

Florida State Road 82 forms the southern border of the community; the highway leads west 15 miles (24 km) to the center of Fort Myers and southeast 20 miles (32 km) to Immokalee.

According to the United States Census Bureau, the Lehigh Acres CDP has a total area of 94.2 square miles (243.9 km^{2}), of which 92.7 square miles (240.0 km^{2}) are land and 1.5 square miles (3.9 km^{2}), or 1.61%, are water.

== History ==
Lehigh Acres was developed in the mid-1950s by Chicago businessman Lee Ratner. Seeking a tax shelter, Ratner had sold his pest control business and faced the possibility of losing most of his earnings to the high capital gains tax of that era. Ratner heard that cattle was a good investment for people in his predicament, and he bought 18,000 acres (73 km^{2}) of land in eastern Lee County and named it the Lucky Lee Ranch. After ranching for a while, and despite having no prior development experience, Ratner joined with Gerald H. Gould, a Florida advertising executive, Manuel Riskin, a Chicago CPA, and Edward Shapiro, a former Chicagoan who was in the real estate business in California, and began land sales at Lehigh Acres.

Gerald Gould was the president of the corporation that developed Lehigh Acres, which began in 1954. He remained as president until the company was sold in 1972.

Since the days of the Lucky Lee Ranch, the boundaries of Lehigh Acres have stretched to cover 61,000 acres (250 km^{2}), including the runways of the former Buckingham Army Airfield, a major Army Air Forces training base that was closed at the end of World War II. The pasture land where Ratner's cattle roamed and the since broken up runways where military flight crews trained has been divided into some 152,000 0.25-and-0.5-acre (1,000 and 2,000 m^{2}) lots for housing, along over 1,400 miles (2,300 km) of roads. Strips of land along major thoroughfares, such as Homestead Road and Lee Boulevard, were set aside for commerce. In 1997, nearly 90% of Lehigh Acres' lots remained vacant.

In 1992, Lee County, with the cooperation of a new developer, declared Lehigh Acres to be blighted, and authorized its Community Redevelopment Agency to take steps towards improving infrastructure and planning elements neglected by the original developer. It is estimated that nearly $11 million would be needed to repave the development's roads.

A surge in housing prices led to a boom in Lehigh Acres new-housing construction from 2003 to 2007, peaking at more than 7,500 new homes constructed in 2006. The number of homes built during this period exceeded the total number of homes constructed during the preceding 50 years.

But as in much of the United States, the real-estate boom of the 2000s went bust. The median house price in the Fort Myers area peaked in late 2005 at $322,300. Three years later, it had plummeted to $106,900. A reliance on construction jobs no longer available pushed the unemployment rate in the area of Lehigh Acres and Fort Myers to 14% by the summer of 2009. Property values reached a low in 2008 of $106,900. By late 2014, property values averaged $169,200.

== Demographics ==
Historical population
Census	Pop.	Note	%±
1970	4,394		—
1980	9,604		118.6%
1990	13,611		41.7%
2000	33,430		145.6%
2010	86,784		159.6%
2020	114,287		31.7%

=== Racial and ethnic composition ===
Lehigh Acres CDP, Florida – Racial and ethnic composition Note: the US Census treats Hispanic/Latino as an ethnic category. This table excludes Latinos from the racial categories and assigns them to a separate category. Hispanics/Latinos may be of any race.
Race / Ethnicity (NH = Non-Hispanic)	Pop 2000	Pop 2010	Pop 2020	% 2000	% 2010	% 2020
White alone (NH)	25,287	38,364	36,679	75.64%	44.21%	32.09%
Black or African American alone (NH)	2,835	15,652	21,013	8.48%	18.04%	18.39%
Native American or Alaska Native alone (NH)	75	234	229	0.22%	0.27%	0.20%
Asian alone (NH)	275	1,019	1,282	0.82%	1.17%	1.12%
Native Hawaiian or Pacific Islander alone (NH)	6	25	44	0.02%	0.03%	0.04%
Other race alone (NH)	55	310	797	0.16%	0.36%	0.70%
Mixed race or Multiracial (NH)	431	1,383	3,471	1.29%	1.59%	3.04%
Hispanic or Latino (any race)	4,466	29,797	50,772	13.36%	34.33%	44.43%
Total	33,430	86,784	114,287	100.00%	100.00%	100.00%

=== 2020 census ===
As of the 2020 census, Lehigh Acres had a population of 114,287. The median age was 34.8 years. 27.9% of residents were under the age of 18 and 12.6% of residents were 65 years of age or older. For every 100 females there were 97.7 males, and for every 100 females age 18 and over there were 94.1 males age 18 and over.

95.1% of residents lived in urban areas, while 4.9% lived in rural areas.

There were 37,292 households in Lehigh Acres, of which 41.9% had children under the age of 18 living in them. Of all households, 49.0% were married-couple households, 15.8% were households with a male householder and no spouse or partner present, and 24.7% were households with a female householder and no spouse or partner present. About 17.3% of all households were made up of individuals and 7.9% had someone living alone who was 65 years of age or older. There were 26,168 families residing in the city.

There were 40,417 housing units, of which 7.7% were vacant. The homeowner vacancy rate was 2.5% and the rental vacancy rate was 6.5%.

Racial composition as of the 2020 census
Race	Number	Percent
White	48,955	42.8%
Black or African American	22,106	19.3%
American Indian and Alaska Native	811	0.7%
Asian	1,327	1.2%
Native Hawaiian and Other Pacific Islander	57	0.0%
Some other race	16,623	14.5%
Two or more races	24,408	21.4%

=== 2010 census ===
As of the 2010 United States census, there were 86,784 people, 27,040 households, and 20,416 families residing in the city.

=== 2000 census ===
As of 2000, 32.3% had children under the age of 18 living with them, 58.4% were married couples living together, 10.2% had a female householder with no husband present, and 27.2% were non-families. 22.0% of all households were made up of individuals, and 13.2% had someone living alone who was 65 years of age or older. The average household size was 2.62 and the average family size was 3.03.

In 2000, the CDP the population was spread out, with 26.0% under the age of 18, 6.8% from 18 to 24, 27.3% from 25 to 44, 20.4% from 45 to 64, and 19.5% who were 65 years of age or older. The median age was 38 years. For every 100 females, there were 94.0 males. For every 100 females age 18 and over, there were 88.5 males.

As of 2000, the median income for a household in the CDP was $31,517, and the median income for a family was $35,492. Males had a median income of $25,202 versus $19,935 for females. The per capita income for the CDP was $17,186. By 2016, this figure rose to $17,222. About 9.8% of families and 11.7% of the population were below the poverty line, including 11.5% of those under age 18 and 7.6% of those age 65 or over.

=== Languages ===
As of 2000, 84.52% of residents spoke English as their first language, while 11.81% spoke Spanish, 1.34% spoke German, and 0.83% spoke French as their mother tongue. In total, 15.47% of the total population spoke languages other than English.

== Public transportation ==
Lehigh Acres is served by LeeTran buses.

== Lehigh Acres Municipal Services Improvement District ==
Most of the CDP, as well as some areas outside of the CDP, is served by the Lehigh Acres Municipal Services Improvement District (MSID), a special services district created by the Florida Legislature which covers areas in Lee and neighboring Hendry County. The MSID has an elected board of commissioners, and has powers over a limited sub-set of services usually provided by municipalities.
