= Upkeep =

Upkeep may refer to:

- Maintenance, repair, and operations
- Upkeep bomb, a bouncing bomb developed in World War II for Operation Chastise
