= Ashley Range =

Former bombing range in Hampshire, England

- Located Near Southampton, Hampshire, England

Site information
- Type: Bombing Range

Location
- Ashley Range, shown within Hampshire
- Coordinates: 50.940°N 1.709°W

Site history
- Built: 1942
- In use: 1942–1946

Ashley Range is a former World War II bombing range in the New Forest, Hampshire, England. The range is approximately 5 mi (8.0 km) north-west of Lyndhurst and 14 mi (23 km) west of Southampton. Barnes Wallis's Bouncing bomb used in Operation Chastise by the Dambusters and the Grand Slam bomb were tested there.

== Overview ==
The site was used to develop a more effective air-raid shelter, built over five and a half months at a cost of £250,000. Once complete, the site became the first to be subjected to the devastating effect of Barnes Wallis's Grand Slam bomb, which was test-dropped on the site. After the end of the war, the site was returned to its natural state and the concrete bunker was encased in a mound of dirt because it could not be demolished. Visitors today can still see the bomb craters, an observation shelter and chalk markings made on the ground to help bombers find their targets.
