= Heinz Schweizer =

German bomb disposal operator (1908–1946)

- Born: 18 July 1908; Berlin, German Empire
- Died: 5 June 1946 (aged 37); Biesenthal, Allied-occupied Germany
- Military career
- Allegiance: Weimar Republic; Nazi Germany
- Branch: Reichswehr; Luftwaffe
- Rank: Captain (Hauptmann)
- Unit: Condor Legion
- Commands: Sprengkommando der Luftwaffe I/IV Ratingen-Düsseldorf
- Conflicts: Spanish Civil War; World War II
- Awards: Knight's Cross of the Iron Cross

Heinz Schweizer (18 July 1908 – 5 June 1946) was a German bomb disposal officer in the Luftwaffe of the Wehrmacht, holding the rank of Captain (Hauptmann). Beginning in 1940, he served in a house demolition and bomb disposal unit (Sprengkommando) based in Düsseldorf-Kalkum during World War II. Renowned for his expertise in defusing unexploded ordnance and saving lives, Schweizer was celebrated by Nazi propaganda as a hero, described as a "man with nerves of steel". However, toward the end of war, he took extraordinary action to rescue approximately 100 to 150 political prisoners held by the Nazis and subjected to forced labour, saving their lives from near-certain death in a detention subcamp near Düsseldorf.

== Background ==
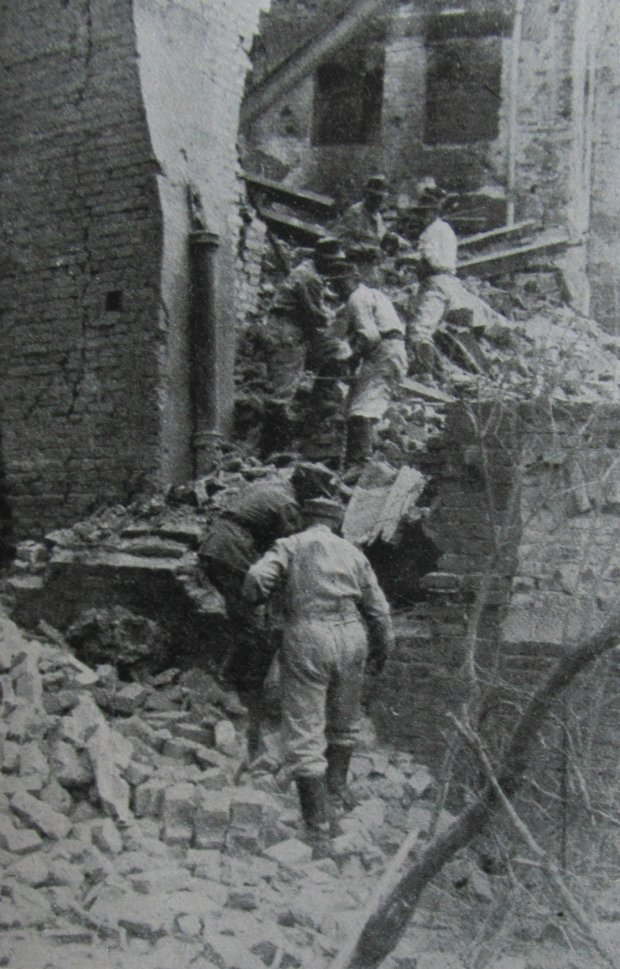
Warsaw Uprising, 8 September 1944. German Sprengkommando (Demolition Command) explosive ordnance technicians prepare to demolish the shelled walls of the Royal Castle in Warsaw as part of a larger plan to destroy the castle entirely.

Little is known about Schweizer's early life in Berlin. In the 1930s, he became an officer in the Reichswehr before transferring to the Luftwaffe, which was newly established in 1935. In 1936, he volunteered for service in the Spanish Civil War as part of the Condor Legion. Around 1940, Schweizer was stationed in Düsseldorf-Kalkum as a specialist in explosives, leading a demolition and bomb disposal unit (Sprengkommando) tasked with defusing and removing unexploded ordnance after air raids in northern Düsseldorf and the surrounding areas. Beginning in 1942, the unit was reinforced by prison inmates, primarily political prisoners. By 1943, the workforce also included approximately 50 forced labourers from the Buchenwald concentration camp. This dangerous work often resulted in fatalities among those involved.

During World War II, the German bomb disposal command operated as a Luftwaffe unit composed of highly trained Feuerwerker (explosive ordnance technicians). These specialists received advanced training in bomb disposal, although, by the later stages of the war, this formal training was replaced by on-the-job experience and examination, similar to the British system. Each demolition and bomb clearance unit, or Sprengkommando, was led by an officer (or, in German, an Oberfeuerwerker, meaning "Senior NCO explosive ordnance technician") and included three or four Feuerwerker. Basic tasks, such as excavating buried bombs after air raids, were carried out by forced labourers, including common criminals and political prisoners, but not prisoners of war (POWs). In German-occupied territories, local citizens were also conscripted for such labour. These forced labourers were overseen by Luftwaffe guards. Relations between Luftwaffe personnel and prison labourers remained cordial, particularly with political prisoners, although less so with common criminals.

=== The RAF Dambusters bouncing bomb ===
In May 1943, Schweizer recovered the unexploded bouncing bomb codenamed 'Upkeep', which had been carried by RAF Lancaster bomber ED927 AJ-E, known as 'Easy Elsie'. The bomber crashed on 16 May 1943, just outside the village of Haldern near the German-Dutch border, during Operation Chastise, also known as the Dambusters Raid. The bomb, intended for the Sorpe Dam, was thrown clear of the crash but did not explode.

=== Knight's Cross award ===
On 28 June 1943, Schweizer was awarded the Knight's Cross of the Iron Cross for his work defusing numerous bombs and developing innovative methods to neutralise unexploded ordnance and delay-action bombs. Some of these techniques are still employed by German bomb disposal units today to address World War II-era bombs. Schweizer became the first non-flying Luftwaffe officer (Hauptmann (W) (Note: The suffix W in brackets after the rank denotes a Feuerwerker, who was a Waffen-Offizier (Weapons Officer or Ordnance/Armament Officer))) to receive this prestigious award. As a form of promotion, he was transferred to a research centre. Nazi propaganda portrayed Schweizer as a heroic figure in bomb disposal, celebrating him as a "man with nerves of steel" who saved lives. However, Schweizer soon distanced himself from the Nazi propaganda machine, briefly stepping away before returning to lead the demolition and bomb clearance unit Sprengkommando 1/IV Ratingen-Düsseldorf, based in Düsseldorf-Kalkum. Researchers suggest that during this time, Schweizer increasingly dissociated himself from Nazism. He is particularly remembered for his courageous efforts to save a group of political prisoners from execution toward the end of the war.

=== Role in saving political prisoners ===
In 1945, Schweizer learned that "the SS, Gestapo, and other authorities ordered the killing of political prisoners so that they would not fall into enemy hands." In March 1945, he was ordered to return approximately 100 forced labourers involved in an evacuation to their penitentiary subcamp in Lüttringhausen, where their deaths were almost certain. This was evidenced by the murder of 60 other prisoners during the final phase of Nazi war crimes. Defying this order, Schweizer, with the assistance of his junior officer, Oberleutnant Werdelmann, devised a pretext. Claiming an urgent need for additional personnel to defuse unexploded bombs, he retained custody of the original group and secured the release of 50 more forced labourers. Shortly after, he surrendered with these prisoners to the United States Army in Bergisches Land.

== After the War and death ==
Schweizer was released from U.S. Army captivity in July 1945, aided by testimony from former prisoners and forced labourers who spoke favourably of his actions to save them during the war. Ignoring warnings, he returned to his family in Biesenthal, near Eberswalde, within the Soviet-occupied zone of Allied-occupied Germany. In June 1946, he was fatally shot in Biesenthal by a Soviet Army soldier, who was reportedly intoxicated at the time. The exact circumstances of his death remain unclear.
