= Bouncing bomb =

Bomb that bounces across a water surface

Vickers Type 464 code name: Upkeep
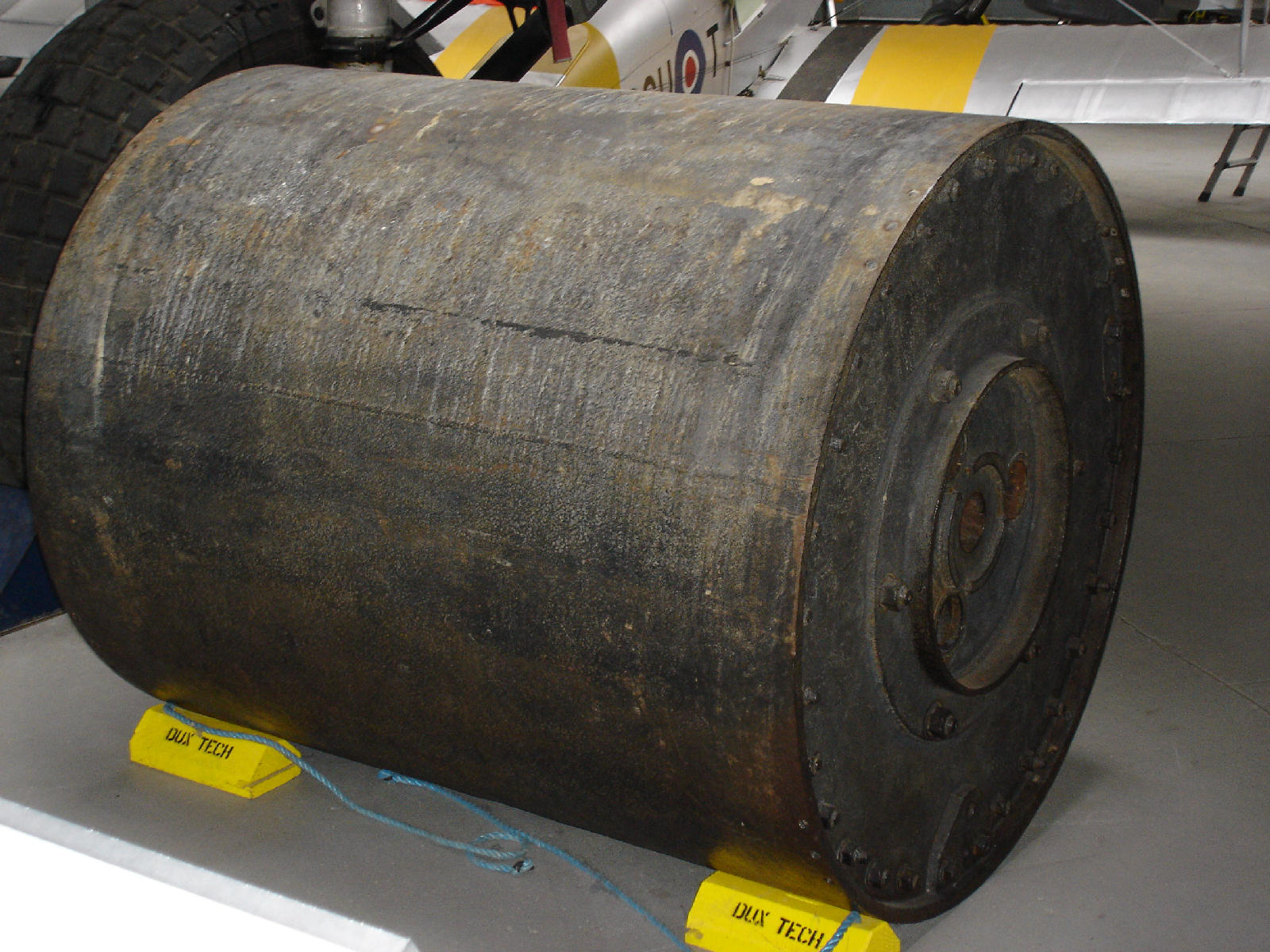
- "Upkeep" bouncing bomb at the Imperial War Museum Duxford
- Type: Conventional (depth charge)
- Place of origin: United Kingdom

Service history
- In service: 16–17 May 1943 (Operation Chastise)
- Used by: No. 617 Squadron RAF
- Wars: World War II

Production history
- Designer: Barnes Wallis
- Designed: April 1942
- Manufacturer: Vickers-Armstrongs
- Produced: February 1943
- No. built: 120 (62 inert and 58 HE filled); 19 used operationally
- Variants: Highball spherical bouncing bomb, inert training bombs

Specifications
- Mass: 9,250 lb (4,200 kg)
- Length: 60 in (1.52 m)
- Width: 50 in (1.27 m)
- Muzzle velocity: 240–250 mph (390–400 km/h); 500 rpm back-spin
- Effective firing range: 400–500 yd (370–460 m)
- Filling: Torpex
- Filling weight: 6,600 lb (2,990 kg)
- Detonation mechanism: hydrostatic fuze (depth of 30 feet (9.1 m)) with backup chemical time fuze.

A bouncing bomb is a bomb designed to bounce to a target across water in a calculated manner to avoid obstacles such as torpedo nets, and to allow both the bomb's speed on arrival at the target and the timing of its detonation to be predetermined, in a fashion similar to that of a regular naval depth charge. The inventor of the first such bomb was the British engineer Barnes Wallis, whose "Upkeep" bouncing bomb was used in the RAF's Operation Chastise of May 1943 to bounce into German dams and explode underwater, with an effect similar to the underground detonation of the later Grand Slam and Tallboy earthquake bombs, both of which he also invented.

== British bouncing bombs ==
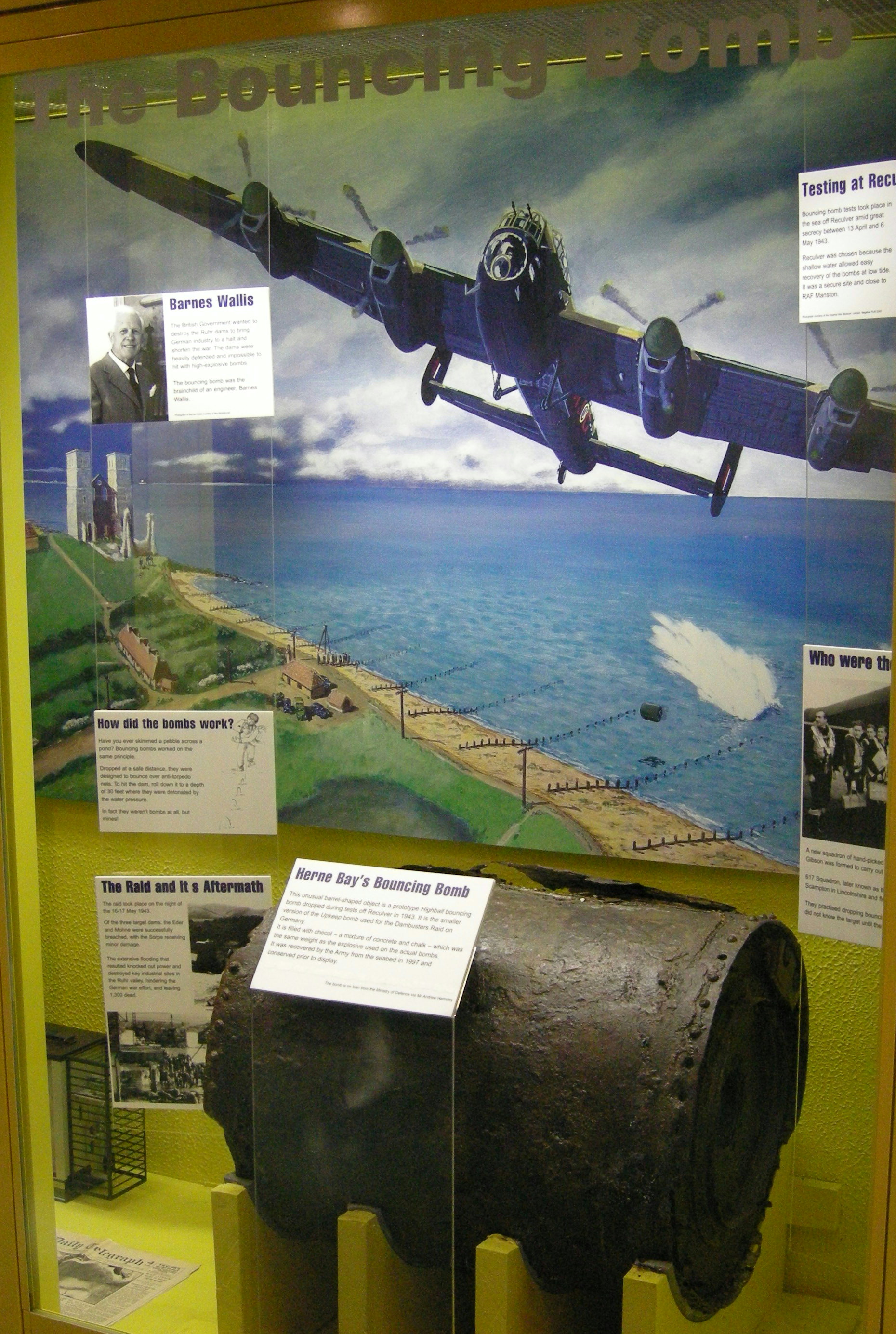
Remains of an Upkeep test prototype recovered from Reculver in 1997, now at Herne Bay Museum

After the outbreak of the Second World War in 1939, Wallis saw strategic bombing as the means to destroy the enemy's ability to wage war and he wrote a paper entitled "A Note on a Method of Attacking the Axis Powers". Referring to the enemy's power supplies, he wrote (as Axiom 3): "If their destruction or paralysis can be accomplished they offer a means of rendering the enemy utterly incapable of continuing to prosecute the war"

Barnes Wallis's April 1942 paper "Spherical Bomb – Surface Torpedo" described a method of attack in which a weapon would be bounced across water until it struck its target, then sink to explode under water, much like a depth charge. Bouncing it across the surface would allow it to be aimed directly at its target, while avoiding underwater defences, as well as some above the surface. Such a weapon would take advantage of the "bubble pulse" effect typical of underwater explosions, greatly increasing its effectiveness: Wallis's paper identified suitable targets as hydro-electric dams "and floating vessels moored in calm waters such as the Norwegian fjords".

Both types of target were already of great interest to the British military when Wallis wrote his paper (which itself was not his first on the subject); German hydro-electric dams had been identified as important bombing targets before the outbreak of World War II, but existing bombs and bombing methods had little effect on them, as torpedo nets protected them from attack by conventional torpedoes and a practical means of destroying them had yet to be devised. In 1942, the British were seeking a means of destroying the German battleship Tirpitz, which posed a threat to Allied shipping in the North Atlantic and had already survived a number of British attempts to destroy it. During this time, the Tirpitz was being kept safe from attack by being moored in Norwegian fjords, where it had the effect of a "fleet in being". Consequently, Wallis's proposed weapon attracted attention and underwent active testing and development. (Note: A mechanical differential analyser analogue computer allegedly used during design of Barnes Wallis's bouncing bombs is preserved in New Zealand at the Museum of Transport and Technology (MOTAT))

On 24 July 1942, a "spectacularly successful" demonstration of such a weapon's potential occurred when a redundant dam at Nant-y-Gro, near Rhayader, in Wales, was destroyed by a mine containing 279 lb (127 kg) of explosive: this was detonated against the dam's side, underwater, in a test undertaken by A.R. Collins, a scientific officer from the Road Research Laboratory, which was then based at Harmondsworth, Middlesex.

A.R. Collins was among a large number of other people besides Barnes Wallis who made wide-ranging contributions to the development of a bouncing bomb and its method of delivery to a target, to the extent that, in a paper published in 1982, Collins himself made it evident that Wallis "did not play an all-important role in the development of this project and in particular, that very significant contributions were made by, for example, Sir William Glanville, Dr. G. Charlesworth, Dr. A.R. Collins and others of the Road Research Laboratory". However, the modification of a Vickers Wellington bomber, to the design of which Wallis himself had contributed, for work in early testing of his proposed weapon, has been cited as an example of how Wallis "would have been the first to acknowledge" the contributions of others. Also, in the words of Eric Allwright, who worked in the Drawing Office for Vickers-Armstrongs at the time, "Wallis was trying to do his ordinary job [for Vickers-Armstrongs] as well as all this – he was out at the Ministry and down to Fort Halstead and everywhere"; Wallis's pressing of his papers, ideas and ongoing developments on relevant authorities helped ensure that development continued; Wallis was principal designer of the models, prototypes and "live" versions of the weapon; and, perhaps most significantly, it was Wallis who explained the weapon in the final briefing for RAF crews before they set off on Operation Chastise, to use one of his designs in action.

A distinctive feature of the weapon, added in the course of development, was back-spin, which improved the height and stability of its flight and its ability to bounce, and helped the weapon to remain in contact with, or at least close proximity to, its target on arrival. (Note: Sources vary on the introduction of back-spin in the weapon's development: e.g while Sweetman says that "There is evidence that [Wallis] had always intended [to include back-spin]", according to Johnson Sir George Edwards in the Christopher Hinton Lecture of 1982, p. 9, wrote, "from what I knew of a cricket ball I persuaded [Wallis] much against his will into putting back-spin on these bombs.'" See also 'Lives Remembered' (Sir George Edwards), in The Times, 21 March 2003.,) (Note: This is prolate spin, as opposed to the flat, oblate spin of a skipped stone) Back-spin is a normal feature in the flight of golf balls, owing to the manner in which they are struck by the club, and it is perhaps for this reason that all forms of the weapon which were developed were known generically as "Golf mines", and some of the spherical prototypes featured dimples. (Note: For Wallis's own reference to "'golf ball' experiments", the origin and use of the generic name "Golf mine", and dimpled prototypes, see Sweetman (2002), (Part 1), pp. 107, 114–115, 117, 118, and Flower (2002), p. 19.)

It was decided in November 1942 to devise a larger version of Wallis's weapon for use against dams, and a smaller one for use against ships: these were code-named "Upkeep" and "Highball" respectively. A third version, code-named "Baseball", was also planned for use by MTBs or MGBs of the Royal Navy Coastal Forces, but "never saw the light of day" Though each version derived from what was originally envisaged as a spherical bomb, early prototypes for both Upkeep and Highball consisted of a cylindrical bomb within a spherical casing. (Note: See e.g. Diagrams from document produced by Dr Wallis to explain how the bouncing bomb Upkeep worked. The National Archives. Retrieved 10 August 2010.) Development, testing and use of Upkeep and Highball were to be undertaken simultaneously, since it was important to retain the element of surprise: if one were to be used against a target independently, it was feared that German defences for similar targets would be strengthened, rendering the other useless. However, Upkeep was developed against a deadline, since its maximum effectiveness depended on target dams being as full as possible from seasonal rainfall, and the latest date for this was set at 26 May 1943. In the event, as this date approached, Highball remained in development, whereas development of Upkeep had completed, and the decision was taken to deploy Upkeep independently.

In January 1974, under Britain's "thirty year rule", secret government files for both Upkeep and Highball were released, although technical details of the weapons had been released in 1963.

=== Upkeep ===
Animation of the principle of the bouncing bomb. The bomb is dropped close to the surface of the lake. Because it is moving almost horizontally, at high velocity and with backspin, it bounces several times instead of sinking. Each bounce is smaller than the previous one. The "bomb run" is calculated so that at its final bounce, the bomb will reach close to the target, where it sinks. A hydrostatic pistol causes it to explode at the right depth, creating destructive shockwaves.

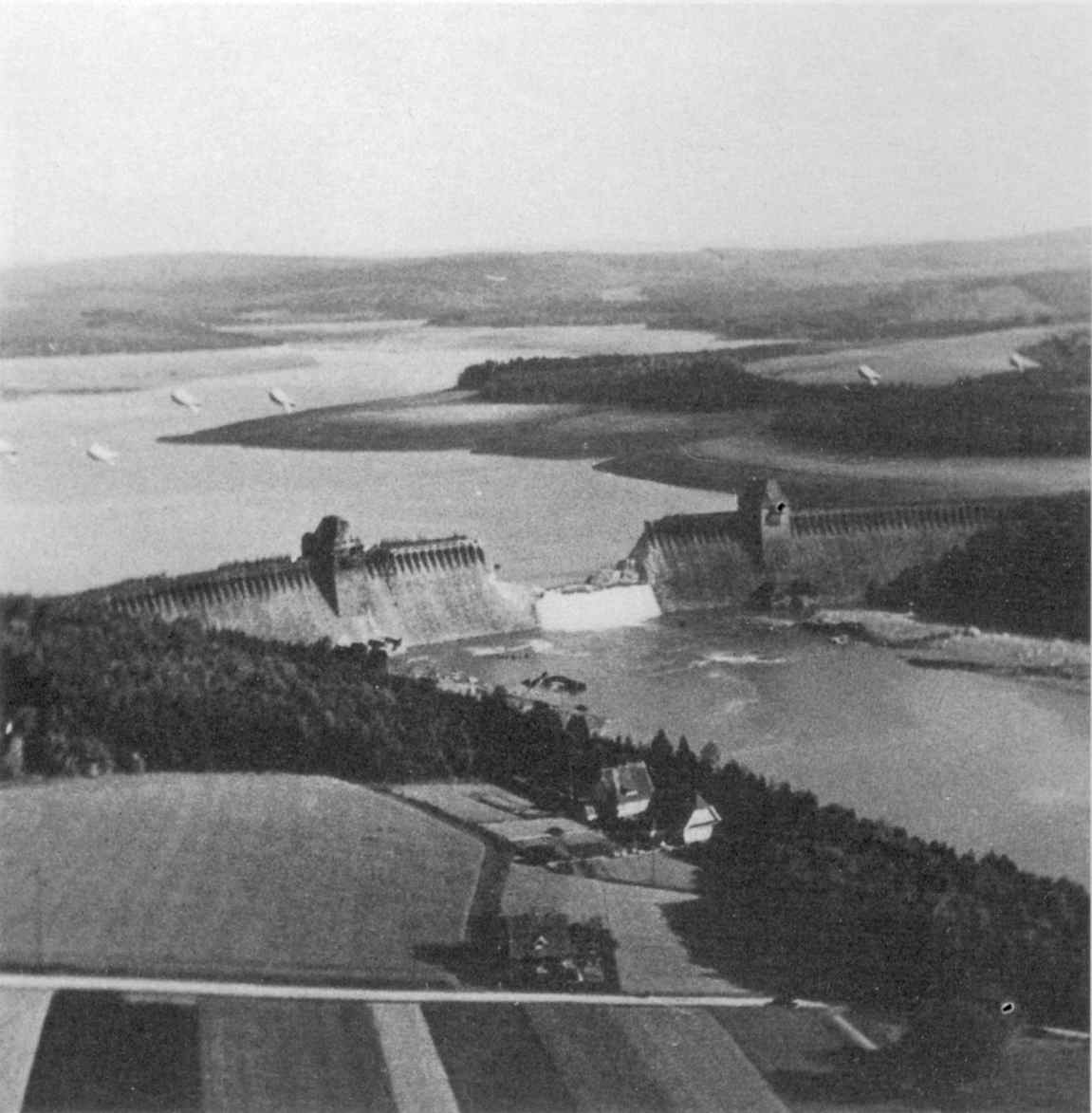
The Möhne dam breached by Upkeep bombs

Testing of Upkeep prototypes with inert filling was carried out at Chesil Beach, Dorset, flying from RAF Warmwell in December 1942, and at Reculver, Kent, flying from RAF Manston in April and May 1943, at first using a Vickers Wellington bomber. However, the dimensions and weight of the full-size Upkeep were such that it could only be carried by the largest British bomber available at the time, the Avro Lancaster, and even that had to undergo considerable modification in order to carry it resulting in the Avro Lancaster "B III (Special)". In testing, it was found that Upkeep's spherical casing would shatter on impact with water, but that the inner cylinder containing the bomb would continue across the surface of the water much as intended. (Note: film Upkeep Casing Break 2 (broadband). The Dambusters (617 Squadron)]. Retrieved 12 August 2010 at half speed; consequently back-spin is easily seen.) As a result, Upkeep's spherical casing was eliminated from the design. Development and testing concluded on 13 May 1943 with the dropping of a live, cylindrical Upkeep bomb 5 miles (8 km) out to sea from Broadstairs, Kent, by which time Wallis had specified that the bomb must be dropped at "precisely" 60 ft (18 m) above the water and 232 mph (373 km/h) ground speed, with back-spin at 500 rpm: the bomb "bounced seven times over some 800 yards, sank and detonated". (Note: Also video Upkeep Test Detonation (broadband) The Dambusters (617 Squadron). Retrieved 12 August 2010.)

In the operational version of Upkeep, known by its manufacturer as "Vickers Type 464", the explosive charge was Torpex, originally designed for use in torpedoes, to provide a longer explosive pulse for greater effect against underwater targets; the principal means of detonation was by three hydrostatic pistols, as used in depth charges, set to fire at a depth of 30 feet (9 m); and its overall weight was 9,250 lb (4,200 kg), of which 6,600 lb (3,000 kg) was Torpex. Provision was also made for "self-destruct" detonation by a fuze, armed automatically as the bomb was dropped from the aircraft, and timed to fire after 90 seconds. The bomb was held in place in the aircraft by a large pair of calipers, or triangulated carrying arms, which swung away from either end of the bomb to release it. Back-spin was to begin 10 minutes before arriving at a target and was imparted via a belt driven by a Vickers Jassey hydraulic motor mounted forward of the bomb's starboard side. This motor was powered by the hydraulic system normally used by the upper gun turret, which had been removed. Close contact with the dam was necessary to obtain the maximum effectiveness from the explosive.

Height was checked by a pair of intersecting spotlight beams, which, when converging on the surface of the water, indicated the correct height for the aircraft – a method devised for the raid by Benjamin Lockspeiser of the Minister of Aircraft Production, and distance from the target by a simple, hand-held, triangular device: with one corner held up to the eye, projections on the other two corners would line up with pre-determined points on the target when it was at the correct distance for bomb release. In practice, this could prove awkward to handle, and some aircrews replaced it with their own arrangements, fixed within the aircraft itself, and involving chinagraph and string.

On the night of 16/17 May 1943, Operation Chastise attacked dams in Germany's Ruhr Valley, using Upkeep. Two dams were breached, causing widespread flooding, damage, and loss of life. The significance of this attack upon the progress of the war is debated. British losses during the operation were heavy; eight of the 19 attacking aircraft failed to return, along with 53 of 113 RAF aircrew. The breach resulted in the deaths of roughly 1600 civilians, including around 1000 prisoners and slave laborers. Upkeep was not used again operationally. By the time the war ended, the remaining operational Upkeep bombs had started to deteriorate and were dumped into the North Sea without their detonation devices.

=== Highball ===
In April 1942, Wallis himself had described his proposed bomb as "essentially a weapon for the Fleet Air Arm". This naval aspect was later to be pressed by a minute issued by British prime minister Winston Churchill, in February 1943, asking "Have you given up all plans for doing anything to Tirpitz while she is in Trondheim? ... It is a terrible thing that this prize should be waiting and no one be able to think of a way of winning it." However, Highball was ultimately developed as an RAF weapon for use against various targets, including Tirpitz.

From November 1942, development and testing for Highball continued alongside that of Upkeep, including the dropping of prototypes at both Chesil Beach and Reculver. While early prototypes dropped at Chesil Beach in December 1942 were forerunners for both versions of the bomb, those dropped at Chesil Beach in January and February 1943 and at Reculver in April 1943 included Highball prototypes. They were dropped by the modified Wellington bomber and at Reculver by a modified de Havilland Mosquito B Mk IV, one of two assigned to Vickers Armstrong for the purpose. By early February 1943, Wallis envisaged Highball as "comprising a 500 lb (230 kg) charge in a cylinder contained in a 35 in (89 cm) sphere with (an overall weight) of 950 lb (430 kg)"; a modified Mosquito could carry two such weapons.

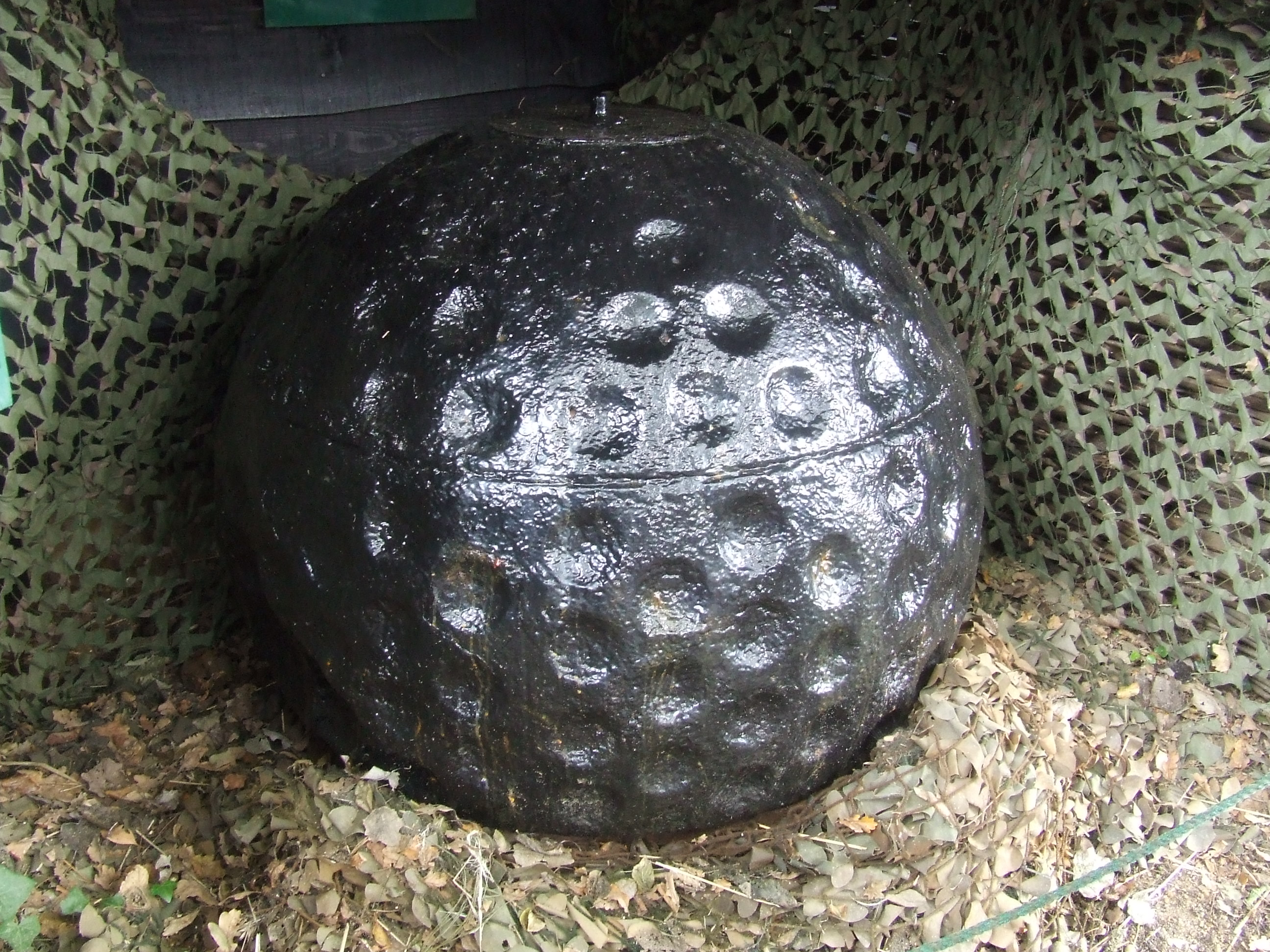
Highball bouncing bomb prototype, now on display at Abbotsbury Swannery in Dorset

In tests at Reculver in the middle of April 1943, it was found that Highball's spherical casing suffered similar damage to that of Upkeep. A prototype with an altered design of casing strengthened by steel plate, but empty of inert filling or explosive, was dropped on 30 April and emerged "quite undamaged". In further testing on 2 May, two examples of this prototype with inert filling, bounced across the surface of the water as intended, though both were found to be dented.

Further testing was carried out by three modified Mosquitoes flying from RAF Turnberry, north of Girvan, on the west coast of Scotland, against a target ship, the former French battleship Courbet, which had been moored for the purpose in Loch Striven. This series of tests, on 9 and 10 May, was hampered by a number of errors: buoys intended to mark a point 1,200 yards (1,097 m) from Courbet, where the prototypes were to be dropped, were found to be too close to the ship by 400 yards (366 m), and, according to Wallis, other errors were due to "Variations in dimensions of [prototypes] after filling and [dimensionally incorrect] jigs for setting up the [caliper] arms". Because of these errors, the prototypes hit the target too fast and too hard. Two aircraft failed to release their prototypes, one of which then fell off while the aircraft was turning for a second attempt.

It was under such circumstances that Upkeep came to be deployed independently of Highball. In addition to continuing problems in testing Highball, it had been observed at the end of March 1943 that "At best [aircrews] would need two months' special training". With this in mind, 618 Squadron had been formed on 1 April 1943 at RAF Skitten, near Wick, in northeastern Scotland, to undertake "Operation Servant", in which Tirpitz would be attacked with Highball bouncing bombs. On 18 April it was recommended that Operation Servant should be undertaken before the end of June, since 618 Squadron could not be held back for this purpose indefinitely. It was not until early September 1943 that, in view of continuing problems with both Highball and its release mechanism, most of 618 Squadron was "released for other duties". This in practice meant the abandonment of Operation Servant. Core personnel of 618 Squadron were retained and these continued work on the development of Highball.

Testing between 15 and 17 May 1944 showed progress with Highball. By this time Courbet had been designated for use as a Gooseberry breakwater for the invasion of Normandy, so the old battleship HMS Malaya, then in reserve, was used instead (also moored in Loch Striven). With crew on board Malaya, bombers dropped inert Highball prototypes fitted with hydrostatic pistols, aiming at the ship. They struck the ship, and at least two punched a hole in the ship's side. On 17 May, for the first time, Highball prototypes were released in pairs, only one second apart.

By the end of May 1944, problems with releasing Highball had been resolved as had problems with aiming. Aiming Highball required a different method from Upkeep; the problem was solved by Wallis's design of a ring aperture sight fixed to a flying helmet. Highball was now a sphere with flattened poles, and the explosive charge was Torpex, enclosed in a cylinder, as in Upkeep; detonation was by a single hydrostatic pistol, set to fire at a depth of 27 feet (8 m), and its weight was 1,280 pounds (581 kg), of which 600 pounds (272 kg) was Torpex.

Highball was never used operationally: on 12 November 1944, in Operation Catechism, Lancasters with Tallboy bombs sank its primary target, Tirpitz. Other potential targets had been considered during Highball's development and later. These included the ships of the Italian navy, canals, dry docks, submarine pens, and railway tunnels (for which testing took place in 1943). But Italy surrendered in September 1943, and the other target ideas were dismissed as impracticable.

In January 1945, at the Vickers experimental facility at Foxwarren, near Cobham, Surrey, a Douglas A-26 Invader medium bomber of the USAAF was adapted to carry two Highballs almost completely enclosed in the bomb bay, using parts from a Mosquito conversion. After brief flight testing in the UK, the kit was sent to Wright Field, Ohio, and installed in a A-26C Invader. Twenty-five inert Highballs, renamed "Speedee" bombs, were also sent for use in the USAAF trials. Drop tests were carried out over Choctawhatchee Bay near Eglin Field, Florida, but the programme was abandoned after the bomb bounced back in a drop on Water Range 60, causing loss of the rear fuselage and a fatal crash on 28 April 1945.

=== Baseball ===
As well as the two types listed above, a smaller weapon, for use by motor torpedo boats, was proposed by the Admiralty in December 1942. Known as "Baseball", it was going to be a tube-launched weapon weighing 300 pounds (140 kg), of which half would be explosive, with an anticipated range of 1,000 to 1,200 yards (910 to 1,100 m).

=== Surviving examples ===
Inert prototypes of both Upkeep and Highball that were dropped at Reculver have been recovered and these, along with a number of other examples, are displayed at various sites:

- Abbotsbury Swannery, near the test site at Chesil Beach (prototype)
- Brenzett Aeronautical Museum, Brenzett, on Romney Marsh (Upkeep with pistols)
- Brooklands Museum, Weybridge (prototype, Upkeep and complete Highball)
- Dover Castle (part of an Upkeep)
- Haverfordwest Aerodrome (part of a Highball shell)
- Herne Bay Museum and Gallery, west of the test site at Reculver (a Highball core)
- Imperial War Museum Duxford (Upkeep)
- Lincolnshire Aviation Heritage Centre, East Kirkby (Upkeep)
- Newark Air Museum (Upkeep)
- Petwood Hotel, Woodhall Spa, Lincolnshire (Upkeep)
- RAF Lossiemouth, Moray – only accessible to the public with prior permission (Upkeep)
- Spitfire & Hurricane Memorial Museum at RAF Manston, Kent (a Highball core)
- Farnborough Air Sciences Trust Museum, Farnborough, Hants (a Highball core)
- de Havilland Aircraft Museum, Hertfordshire (complete Highball)
- RAF Scampton Heritage Centre (Upkeep prototype)
- Yorkshire Air Museum, Elvington, York (Full sized Upkeep prototype)
- Bundeswehr Museum of German Defense Technology, Koblenz, Germany (Full sized Upkeep)
- Edersee Museum, Edersee, Germany (Full sized Upkeep)

In 2010, a diving project in Loch Striven successfully located several Highball prototypes, under around 114 feet (35 m) of water. In July 2017, two Highballs were successfully recovered from Loch Striven in a joint operation by teams from East Cheshire Sub-Aqua Club and the Royal Navy. One is now displayed at the de Havilland Aircraft Museum and the other arrived at Brooklands Museum in late 2019 after undergoing conservation at the Mary Rose Trust.

== German bouncing bomb ==
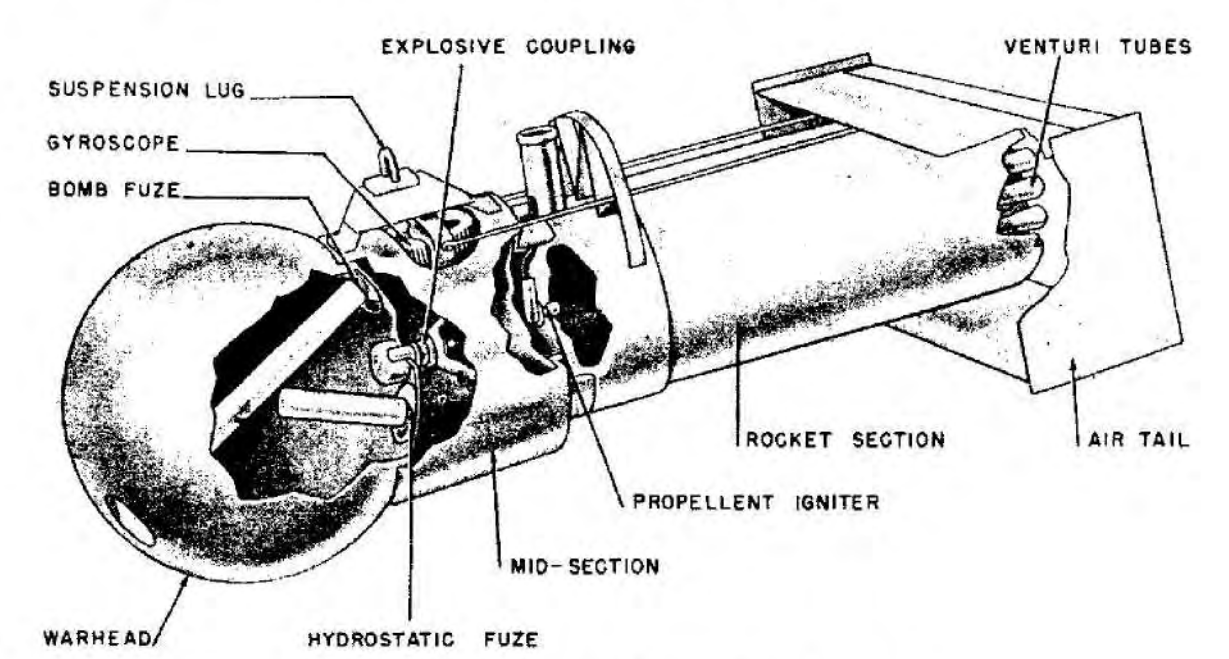
A post-war diagram of a German Kurt, rocket-boosted bouncing bomb.

After Operation Chastise, German forces discovered an Upkeep bomb intact in the wreckage of the Lancaster commanded by Flt Lt Barlow, which had struck high tension cables at Haldern, near Rees, Germany, and crashed. The bomb had not been released and the aircraft had crashed on land, so none of the detonation devices had been set off. Heinz Schweizer, a renowned bomb disposal officer in the Luftwaffe's Sprengkommando unit, was tasked with safely recovering and examining the intact bouncing bomb. Subsequently, a 385-kilogram (849 lb) version of Upkeep, code-named "Kurt" or "Emil", was built at the Luftwaffe's Erprobungsstelle, or "test site", on Germany's Baltic coast at Travemünde, one in a network of four such establishments in Nazi Germany. The importance of back-spin was not understood and trials by a Focke-Wulf Fw 190 proved to be dangerous to the aircraft, because the bomb matched the speed at which it was dropped. Attempts to rectify that with booster rockets failed and the project was cancelled in 1944.

== Re-creating the bouncing bomb ==
In 2011, a project led by Dr Hugh Hunt of the Department of Engineering, University of Cambridge, re-created the bouncing bomb and tested it in a Dambusters-like raid. Buffalo Airways was selected as the company to fly the mission with their Douglas DC-4. The project was documented in the documentary television show Dambusters Fly Again in Canada and Australia, Dambusters: Building the Bouncing Bomb in the UK, and the Nova episode Bombing Hitler's Dams in the US. It involved dropping a replica dummy bomb, which performed as intended, striking a replica dam which had been specially constructed; this was subsequently destroyed by a charge placed where the bomb had landed. The filming of the documentary was itself documented as part of the Ice Pilots NWT reality television series that follows Buffalo Airways in season 3 episode 2 "Dambusters".

== Gallery ==
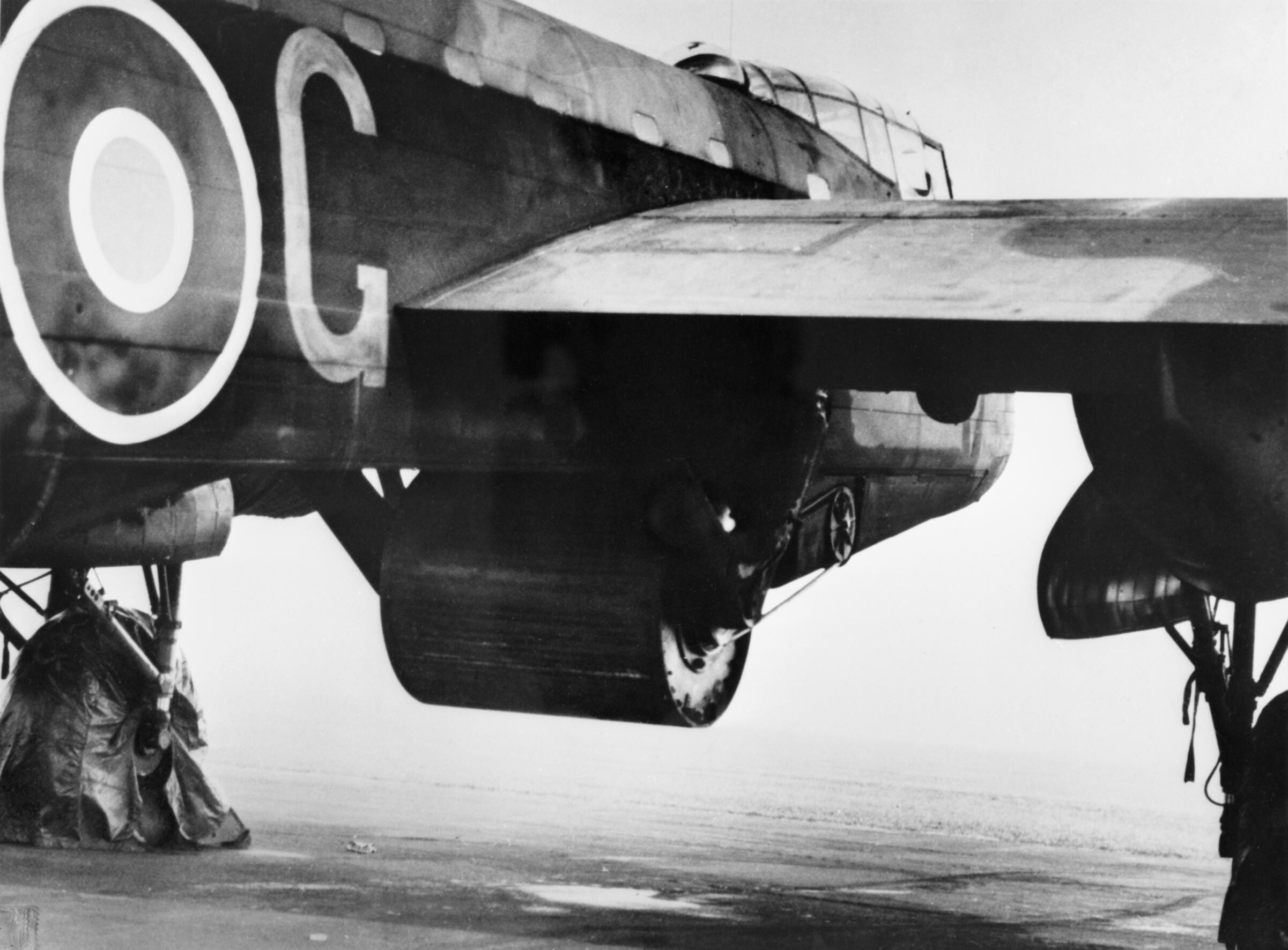
Upkeep bouncing bomb in position in the bomb bay of Guy Gibson's Lancaster – serial ED932/G, code 'AJ-G'

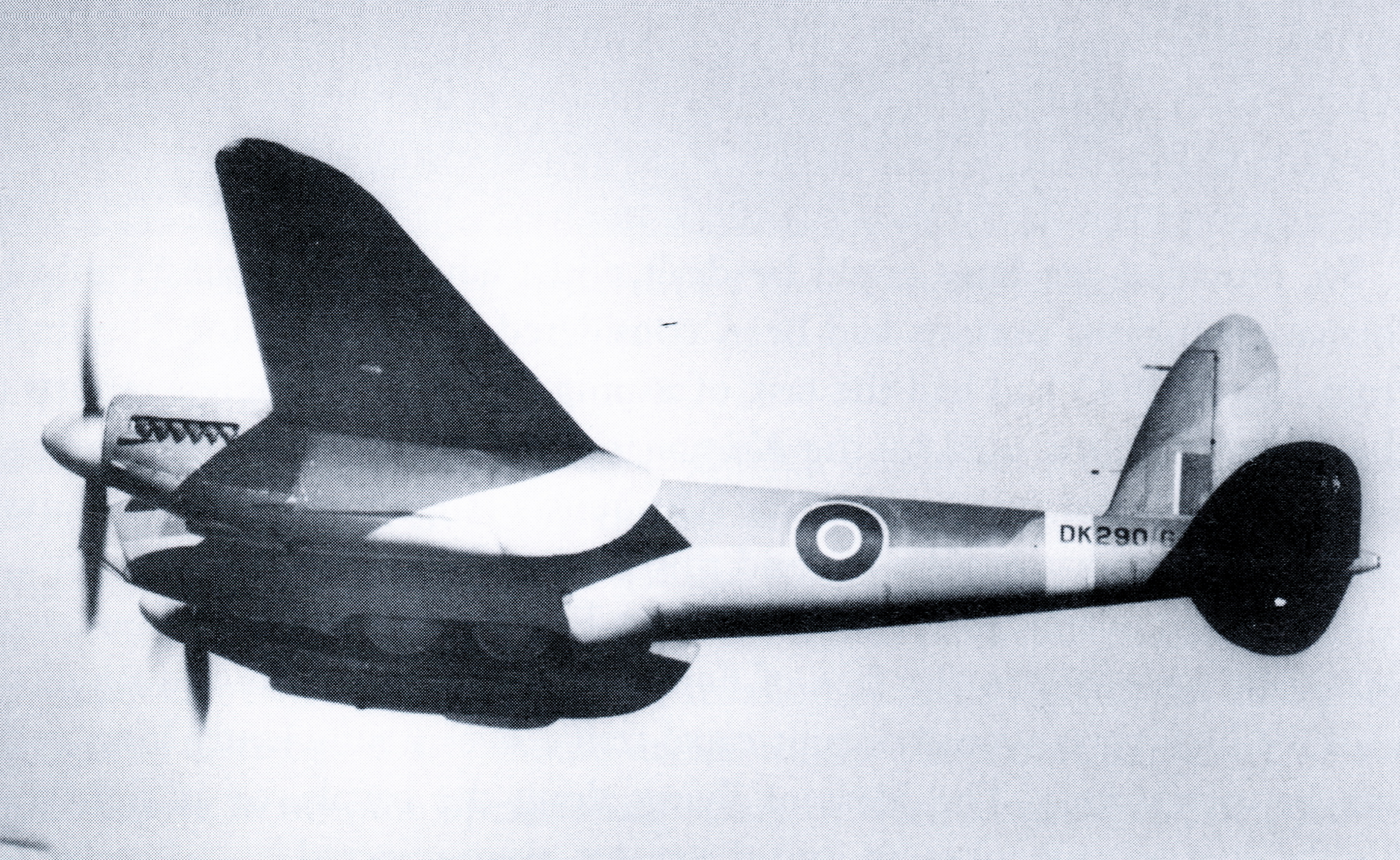
Highball prototypes in the modified bomb bay of de Havilland Mosquito DK290/G. The suffix 'G' was applied to the serial of some experimental (not operational squadron) aircraft, to show that they must be guarded at all times whilst on the ground, due to their Top Secret nature.

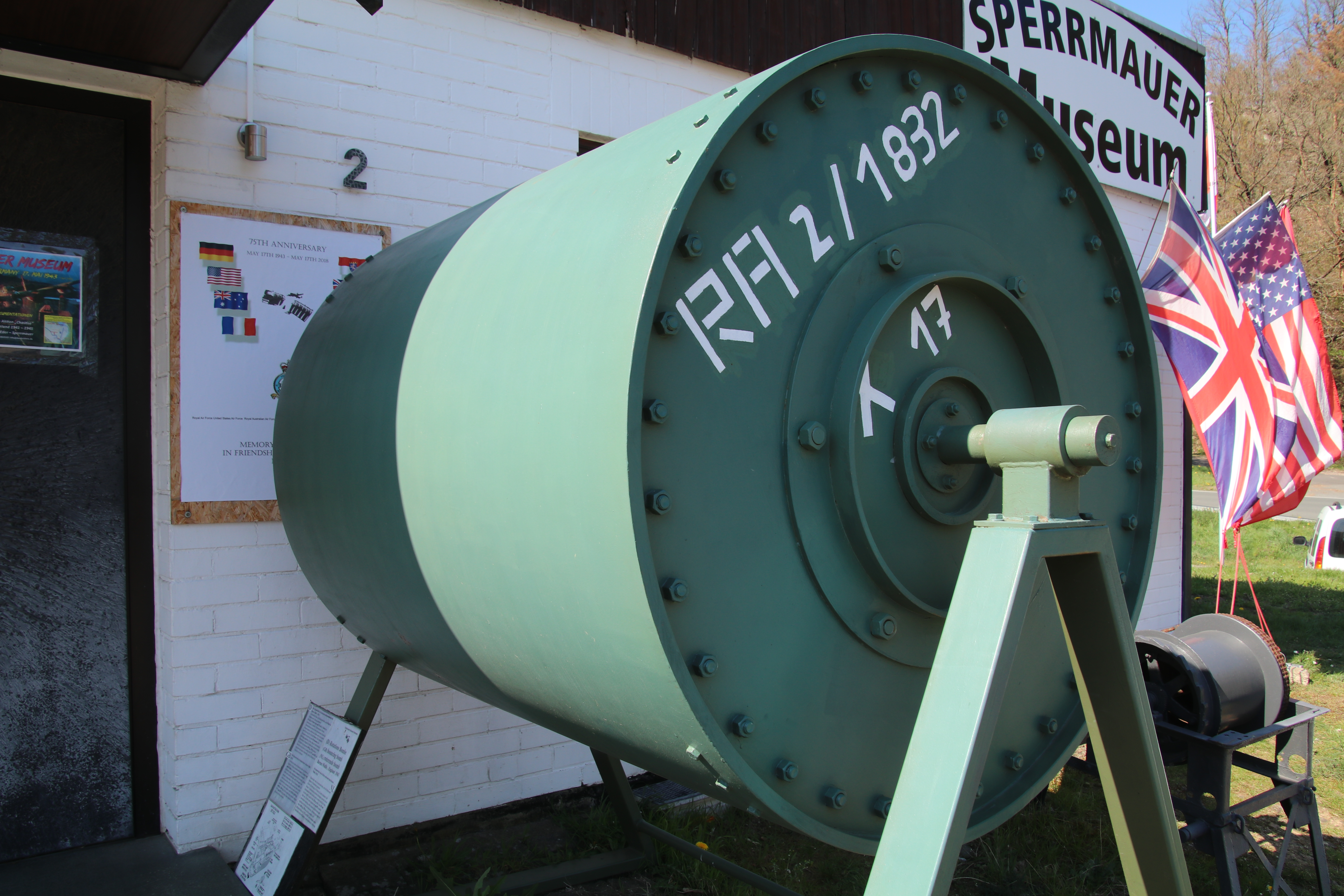
Bouncing bomb "Upkeep" model. Sperrmauer Museum Edersee.

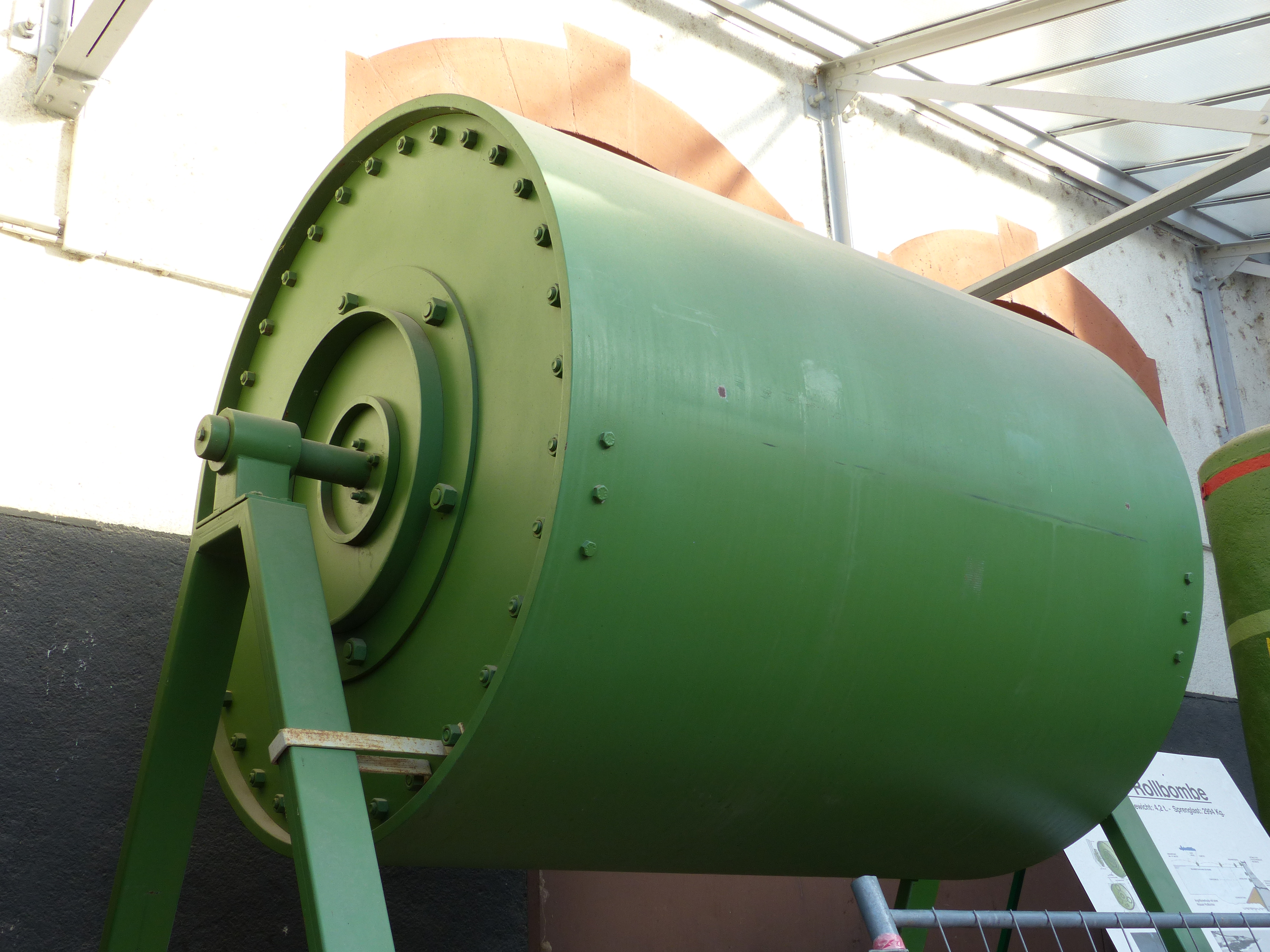
Bouncing bomb "Upkeep" model. Studiensammlung Koblenz.
