= Air Force Armament Museum =

Museum in Florida, United States

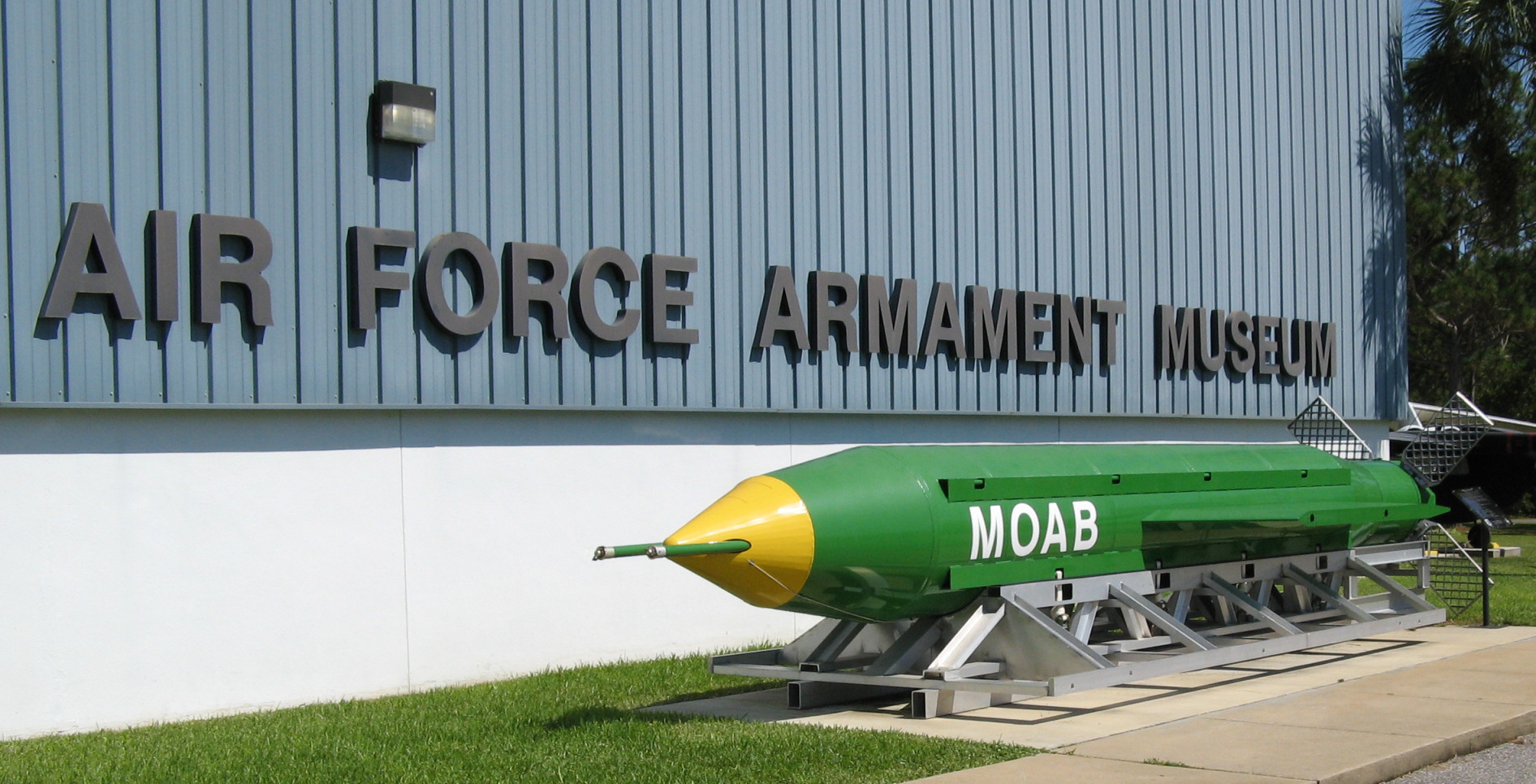
- GBU-43/B Massive Ordnance Air Blast weapon on display in front of the museum

- Location within Florida
- Established: 1975
- Location: Eglin Air Force Base, Valparaiso, Florida
- Coordinates: 30.46625°N 86.56154°W
- Type: Military aviation museum
- Website: www.afarmamentmuseum.com

The Air Force Armament Museum is a military aviation museum adjacent to Eglin Air Force Base in Valparaiso, Florida, dedicated to the display of Air Force armament. It is supported by the private, non-profit Air Force Armament Museum Foundation.

== History ==
The museum opened to the public on 22 June 1974 in a converted 1940s era chapel. Two years later, the Air Force Armament Museum Foundation was established with the goal of constructing a new building. The foundation faced significant public opposition in its early years driven by a referendum to appropriate county funding for the new building. After the referendum failed, the original building was condemned and the museum was forced to close in 1981.

A new 20,000-square-foot (1,900 m^{2}) square foot building located outside the base's west gate was eventually funded entirely through private donations. The new museum building opened on 15 November 1985. Shortly thereafter, an exhibit on prisoners of war was inaugurated. Starting in 1990, a number of aircraft were received in quick succession, with an SR-71 arriving that year, a B-52 in 1991, and a MiG-21 in 1992. An exhibit about Air Force Special Operations Command was dedicated in 1996.

By 2007, the museum began raising funds for an educational annex. In 2019 and 2020, a P-51 and F-86 respectively were experimentally wrapped in vinyl. Following decades of planning, an African American Military Heritage Hall – the first of four Quonset hut styled structures – opened to the public in February 2022. The B-52 on display was repainted the following April. A new visitor control center for the base was opened on the museum grounds in May 2024. An F-15E, one of the prototypes for the program and later a weapons test aircraft, was placed on display as a memorial to former base commander Maj. Gen. Robert W. Chedister in April 2026.

== Exhibits ==
A wide variety of bombs, missiles, and rockets are exhibited, including the newest air-to-air missile, the AMRAAM, and the GBU-28 bunker-buster developed for use during Operation Desert Storm. Other missiles include the Paveway series, Falcons, the Tomahawk, Mace, Hound Dog, radar-controlled, laser-controlled and several guided by a TV camera in the nose. Also on display is the GBU-43 MOAB, Massive Ordnance Air Blast bomb, or by its nickname, "Mother of All Bombs", the world's largest conventional explosive weapon. A predecessor, the T-12 Cloudmaker 38,600 lb (17,500 kg) earthquake bomb, is displayed outside, while a Fat Man casing is indoors. In addition, a BLU-82B was acquired in 2019.

A gun vault displays a variety of weapons ranging from a 1903 Springfield rifle to the GAU-8, which is capable of shooting 6,000 rounds per minute. Featured are the Sikes Antique Pistol Collection, with over 180 handguns, including flintlocks, duelling pistols, Western six-shooters, Civil War pistols, and a wide variety of early military weaponry.

== Programs ==
The museum hosts the Engineers for America education program, which involves a school classroom tour of the museum with basic engineering experiments led by teachers and volunteers.

== Collection ==
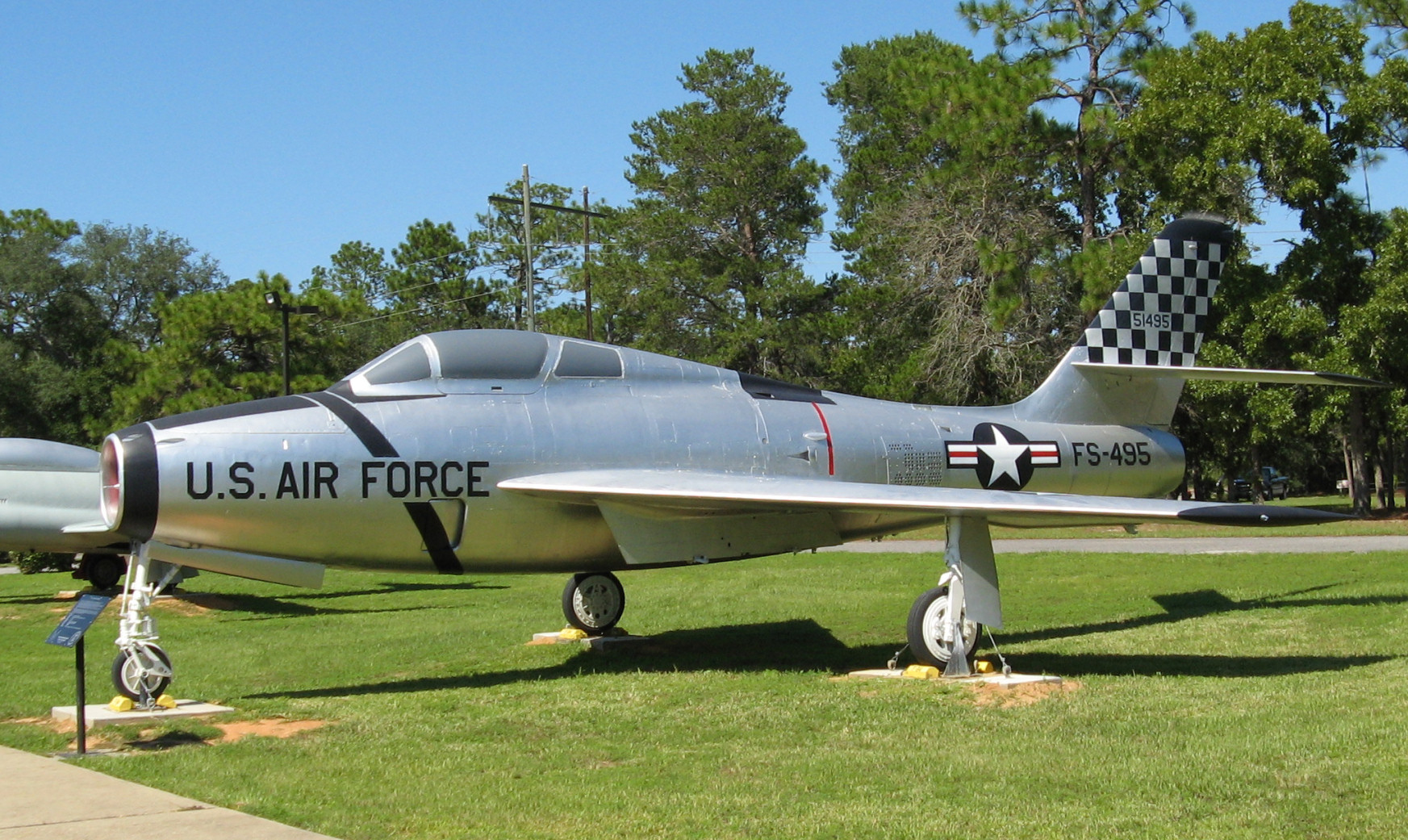
Republic F-84F Thunderstreak

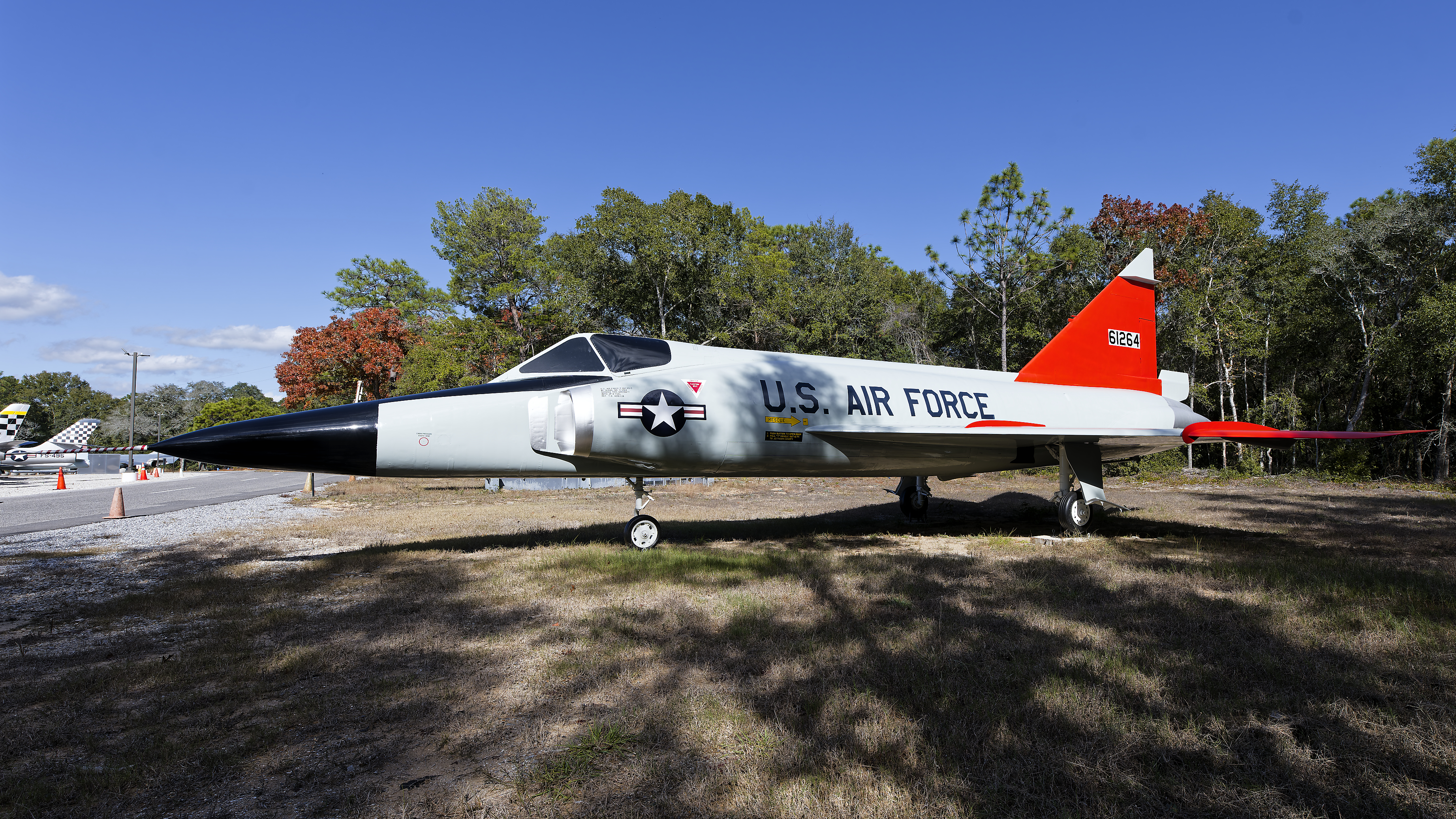
Convair F-102 Delta Dagger

=== Aircraft on display ===
- Bell UH-1M Iroquois 66-15186
- Boeing B-17G Flying Fortress 44-83863
- Boeing B-52G Stratofortress 58-0185, "El Lobo II"
- Boeing RB-47H Stratojet 53-4296
- Cavalier F-51D Mustang 68-15796
- Cessna O-2A Skymaster 68-6864
- Convair F-102 Delta Dagger 56-1264
- Douglas TC-47B Skytrain 44-76486
- Fairchild Republic A-10A Thunderbolt II 75-0288
- General Dynamics F-16A Fighting Falcon 80-0573
- General Dynamics F-111E Aardvark 68-0058
- Lockheed AC-130A Spectre 53-3129
- Lockheed F-80C Shooting Star 49-0432
- Lockheed F-104D Starfighter 57-1331
- Lockheed MQM-105 Aquila – mock-up
- Lockheed SR-71A Blackbird 61-7959
- Lockheed T-33A 53-5947
- Martin EB-57B Canberra 52-1516
- McDonnell F-4C Phantom II 64-0817
- McDonnell JF-101B Voodoo 56-0250
- McDonnell RF-4C Phantom II 67-0452
- McDonnell Douglas F-15A Eagle 74-0124
- McDonnell Douglas F-15E Strike Eagle 86-0184
- Mikoyan-Gurevich MiG-21F-13 14
- North American F-86F Sabre 52-5513
- North American F-100C Super Sabre 54-1986
- North American TB-25J Mitchell 44-30854
- Northrop F-89D Scorpion 53-2610
- Republic F-84F Thunderjet 51-9495
- Republic F-105D Thunderchief 58-1155
- Republic P-47N Thunderbolt 44-89320
- Ryan BQM-34A Firebee
- Ryan BQM-34F Firebee 70-1410
- Sikorsky MH-53M Pave Low IV 73-1652

=== Missiles on display ===
- General Dynamics BGM-109A Tomahawk
- Martin CGM-13 Mace 59-4860
- North American AGM-28 Hound Dog 59-2794
- Republic-Ford JB-2 – on loan from the National Air and Space Museum
