= GBU-76/B Next Generation Penetrator =

American next-generation penetrator bomb

- Type: Bunker buster
- Place of origin: United States

Service history
- In service: Development
- Used by: United States Air Force

Production history
- Designer: United States Air Force
- Designed: By 2024

Specifications (Proposed system)
- Mass: Proposed 20,000–30,000 lb class

The GBU-76/B Next Generation Penetrator is a planned American air-to-ground penetrator bomb being developed for the United States Air Force. The weapon is intended to succeed the GBU-57/B MOP, and will be a precision-guided munition designed to destroy deeply buried and heavily fortified targets.

The GBU-76/B designation was publicly disclosed in June 2026, when the Air Force began seeking industry support for the programme's development, production and sustainment.

The weapon is intended to provide penetration capabilities comparable to or exceeding those of the GBU-57 while incorporating developments in guidance, navigation and weapon design. Its final specifications, operational deployment date and aircraft compatibility have not been publicly confirmed.

== Development ==
The Next Generation Penetrator programme was established to develop a successor to the GBU-57/B MOP. The requirement gained additional significance following the first combat use of the GBU-57 against Iranian nuclear facilities during Operation Midnight Hammer in June 2025.

In September 2025, Applied Research Associates announced that it had received a contract to develop and deliver full-scale prototypes for the Next Generation Penetrator programme. Boeing was to support the development of the weapon's tail assembly and the integration of the complete munition.

On 1 June 2026, the Air Force Life Cycle Management Center issued a sources-sought notice identifying the programme's weapon as the GBU-76/B. The notice sought information from potential contractors capable of supporting research and development, manufacturing, testing, delivery and long-term sustainment. It represented market research rather than the award of a production contract.

The programme's proposed development activities include work on the warhead, fuzing, guidance, navigation and control systems, aircraft integration, and supporting mission-planning equipment. The Air Force has also expressed interest in technologies capable of maintaining accuracy in environments where satellite navigation signals are degraded or unavailable.

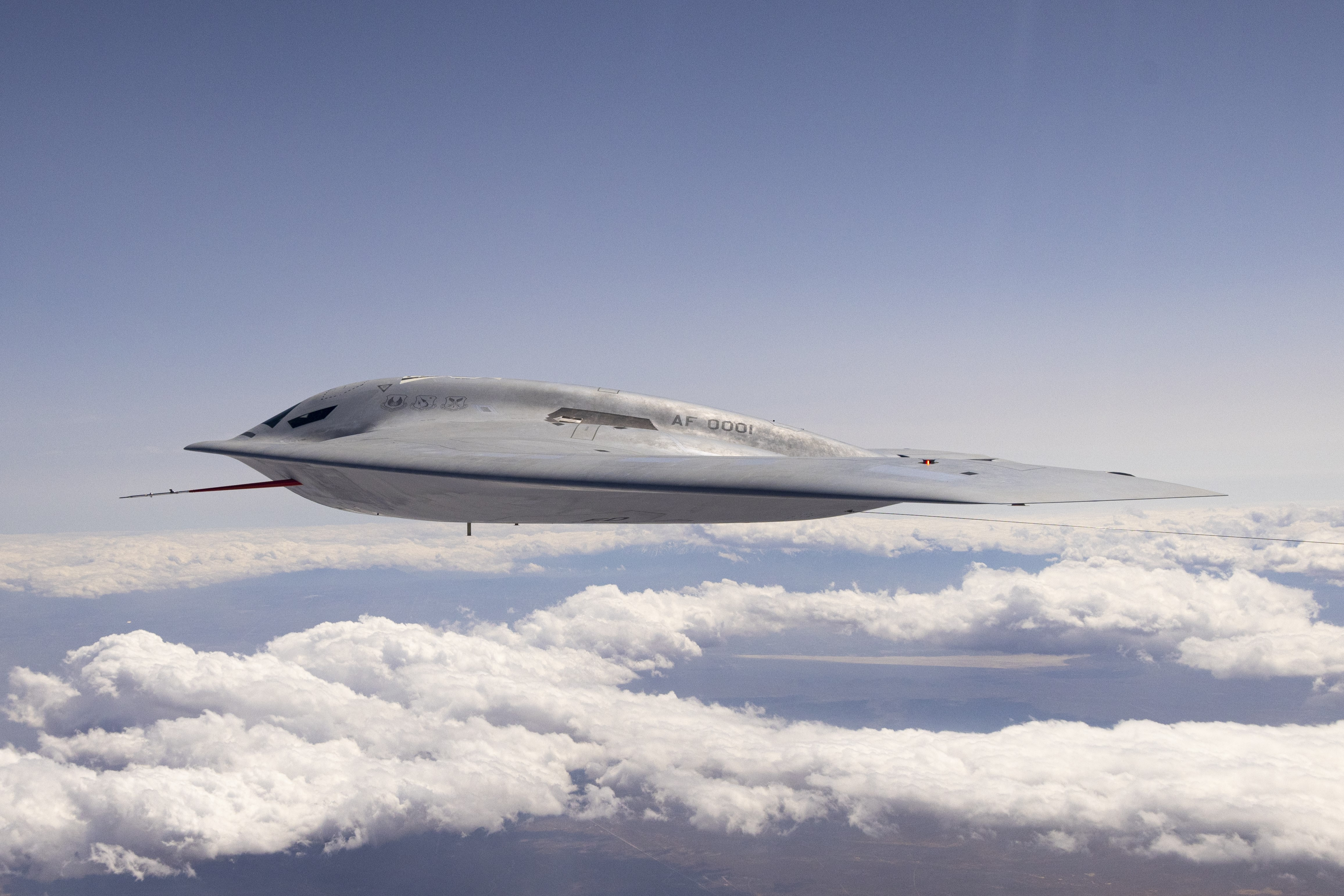
The B-21 Raider, one of the planned delivery systems for the GBU-76

== Development status ==
As of October 2026, the GBU-76/B remains a development programme. The Air Force's fiscal year 2027 budget documentation indicates that prototype demonstration activities, including design, product development, testing, modelling and simulation, are expected to continue through the end of fiscal year 2028.

No operational deployment date has been publicly confirmed. The GBU-57/B is expected to remain in service while development of its successor continues.

== See also ==
- GBU-57/B Massive Ordnance Penetrator
- B-2 Spirit
- B-21 Raider
- Bunker buster
