= GBU-57A/B MOP =

American GPS-guided "bunker buster" bomb

GBU-57A/B Massive Ordnance Penetrator
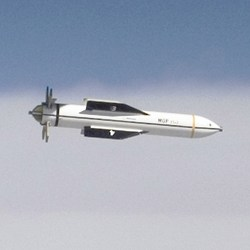
- GBU-57 MOP prototype
- Type: Bunker buster
- Place of origin: United States

Service history
- In service: 2011–present
- Used by: United States Air Force
- Wars: Twelve-Day War; 2026 Iran war

Production history
- Manufacturer: Boeing
- No. built: at least 20

Specifications
- Mass: 27,125 lb (12,304 kg)
- Length: 20.5 ft (6.2 m)
- Diameter: 31.5 in (0.80 m)
- Filling: AFX-757/PBXN-114
- Filling weight: 4,590 / 752 lb (2,082 / 341 kg)

The GBU-57 series MOP—the initials stand for Guided Bomb Unit and Massive Ordnance Penetrator—is a 30,000-pound (14,000 kg) class, 20.5-foot-long (6.2 m) precision-guided "bunker buster" bomb developed by Boeing for the United States Air Force (USAF). Composed of a BLU-127 bomb body and an integrated GPS/INS guidance package, the GBU-57 has seven variants, the most recent being the GBU-57F/B. Due to its size and weight, the GBU-57 MOP can be carried only by the Northrop B-2 Spirit strategic bomber and the B-21 Raider, although initial tests were conducted with a modified Boeing B-52 Stratofortress.

The GBU-57 MOP was first used in combat on June 22, 2025, when seven Northrop B-2 Spirit stealth bombers dropped 14 GBU-57s on Iran's Fordow Uranium Enrichment Plant and Natanz Nuclear Facility. GBU-57s were also used in combat in the 2026 Iran war.

The bomb is much larger than earlier USAF bunker-busters such as the 5,000-pound (2,300 kg) GBU-28 and GBU-37. Despite weighing more than the MOAB, the latter contains a larger amount of explosive, as a more general purpose munition.

== Development and production ==
Test footage of the GBU-57 Massive Ordinance Penetrator (MOP).

In 2002, the US Air Force began the "Big BLU" (BLU = Bomb Live Unit) program to develop a series of very powerful conventional munitions. Two main weapons were associated with this concept: a blast variant, the GBU-43/B MOAB (Massive Ordnance Air Blast), a 21,700-pound conventional bomb designed to destroy a large area; and a penetrator variant, the GBU-57 MOP (Massive Ordnance Penetrator). The MOAB was developed in 2003, but the MOP project was paused for funding and technical difficulties.

Bomb damage assessment during the 2003 invasion of Iraq revealed that the Air Force's bunker-busting bombs sometimes failed to destroy fortified military bunkers. This led to the resumption of the Big BLU project. In July 2004, the USAF asked defense contractors to develop a large, precision-guided bomb that could destroy targets deep underground, in caves, or in hardened bunkers. That year, the Defense Threat Reduction Agency (DTRA) and the Munitions Directorate of the Air Force Research Laboratory (AFRL) at Eglin Air Force Base launched the MOP project.

The MOP was designed by Boeing to be used with the B-2 Spirit. It was first tested in March 2007, in a DTRA tunnel at the White Sands Missile Range in New Mexico. In July 2007, Northrop Grumman received a contract to refit the B-2, enabling it to carry two of the 14-ton bombs. Beginning in 2008, the MOP was tested under various conditions, including on rocket sleds at Holloman High Speed Test Track and from B-52 and B-2 strategic bomber aircraft at White Sands.

Congress approved the acceleration of the project in October 2009, but funding delays and test-schedule changes delayed the deployment. The USAF finally began receiving the MOP in September 2011, and had received 16 MOPs by November 2011. In March 2012, there was an "operational stockpile" at Whiteman Air Force Base. By early 2013, the MOP had been integrated onto the B-2.

By November 2015, at least 20 of the bombs had been delivered to the USAF. In October 2019, the USAF awarded $90 million contracts to two steel forging plants to make an unspecified number of case assemblies for the bomb's BLU-127C/B warhead.

In 2024, it was announced that the production capacity of the GBU-57 was going to be at minimum tripled.

== Key components ==
The GBU-57's explosive component is a bomb of the BLU-127 series, whose modular design accommodates improvements and upgrades. One variant of the BLU-127 bomb body contains 4,590 pounds (2,082 kg) of AFX-757 and 752 pounds (341 kg) of PBXN-114, a polymer-bonded explosive (PBX), for a total explosive payload of 5,342 pounds (2,423 kg). The PBX is optimized for controlled detonation in confined spaces. The bomb's casing is made from high-density Eglin steel alloy, engineered to survive the extreme stresses of deep penetration before detonation.

Attached to the BLU-127's tail, is a KMU-612 tail-kit which contains a GPS-assisted inertial navigation system guidance package, as well as control surfaces to maintain trajectory and allow for mid-course adjustments. The GBU-57 has grid fins, not the planar fins found on most conventional bombs, because they can fold for storage in a B-2's bomb bays and offer greater control at high speeds. Grid fins have higher drag than planar fins, and so are usually smaller.

The GBU-57 is a precision-guided munition, able to strike within meters of its target. Detonation timing is managed by the Large Penetrator Smart Fuze (LPSF), which adjusts the moment of explosion based on impact depth and the characteristics of the underground structure.

== Combat use ==
=== US airstrikes on Iranian nuclear facilities ===
The first combat use of the GBU-57 was during the United States strikes on Iranian nuclear sites on June 22, 2025, when seven Northrop B-2 Spirit stealth bombers dropped twelve MOPs on the Fordow Uranium Enrichment Plant and two on the Natanz Nuclear Facility.

There has been debate over whether the GBU-57 Massive Ordnance Penetrator (MOP) can reliably destroy Iran's deeply buried nuclear sites. The Fordow facility and the new halls under construction at Natanz are thought to lie more than 80 metres (262 ft) underground, whereas the original Natanz enrichment plant sits roughly 20 metres (66 ft) below the surface.

The MOP is reportedly able to penetrate about 18 metres (59 ft) of reinforced concrete with a compressive strength of 5,000 psi (34 MPa). Iranian domestic research has produced concrete exceeding 30,000 psi (210 MPa), which could sharply reduce the bomb's effective penetration depth. Additionally, the Fordow site is underneath rock composed primarily of limestone which has variable compressive strength but can reach 25,000 psi (172 MPa), especially at greater depths. Advanced bunker-shell construction techniques can cause deflection or yaw.

=== 2026 usage ===
The GBU-57 was used in combat in the 2026 Iran War.

== Specifications and capabilities ==
- Length: 20.5 feet (6.2 m)
- Diameter: 31.5 inches (0.8 m)
- BLU-127 bomb body weight: 27,125 pounds (12,304 kg)
- Explosive weight: 5,342 pounds (2,423 kg)
  - AFX-757: 4,590 pounds (2,082 kg)
  - PBXN-114: 752 pounds (341 kg)
- Penetration: (debated) There is debate about the penetration capabilities of the bomb. The US Air Force has said that the GBU-57 can penetrate up to 200 ft (60 m) of unspecified material before exploding. The BBC reports that analysts at Janes Information Services say the weapon can penetrate about 200 ft (60 m) of earth or 60 ft (18 m) of concrete. A separate source suggests penetration of up to 60 ft (18 m) into reinforced concrete with a compressive strength of 5,000 psi (34 MPa) and 8 ft (2.4 m) into 10,000 psi (69 MPa) reinforced concrete.

Only the B-2 Spirit is configured to carry the MOP; the B-21 Raider is slated to carry it. The B-52 has been used to test the MOP, but would require modification to be used in combat.

The GBU-57 has a "smart" fuze that is capable of achieving effects against targets on which there is limited intelligence. It can also be preprogrammed to detonate at a specified depth.

== Users ==
- United States
  - United States Air Force – At least 20 in service as of November 2015.

== Gallery ==
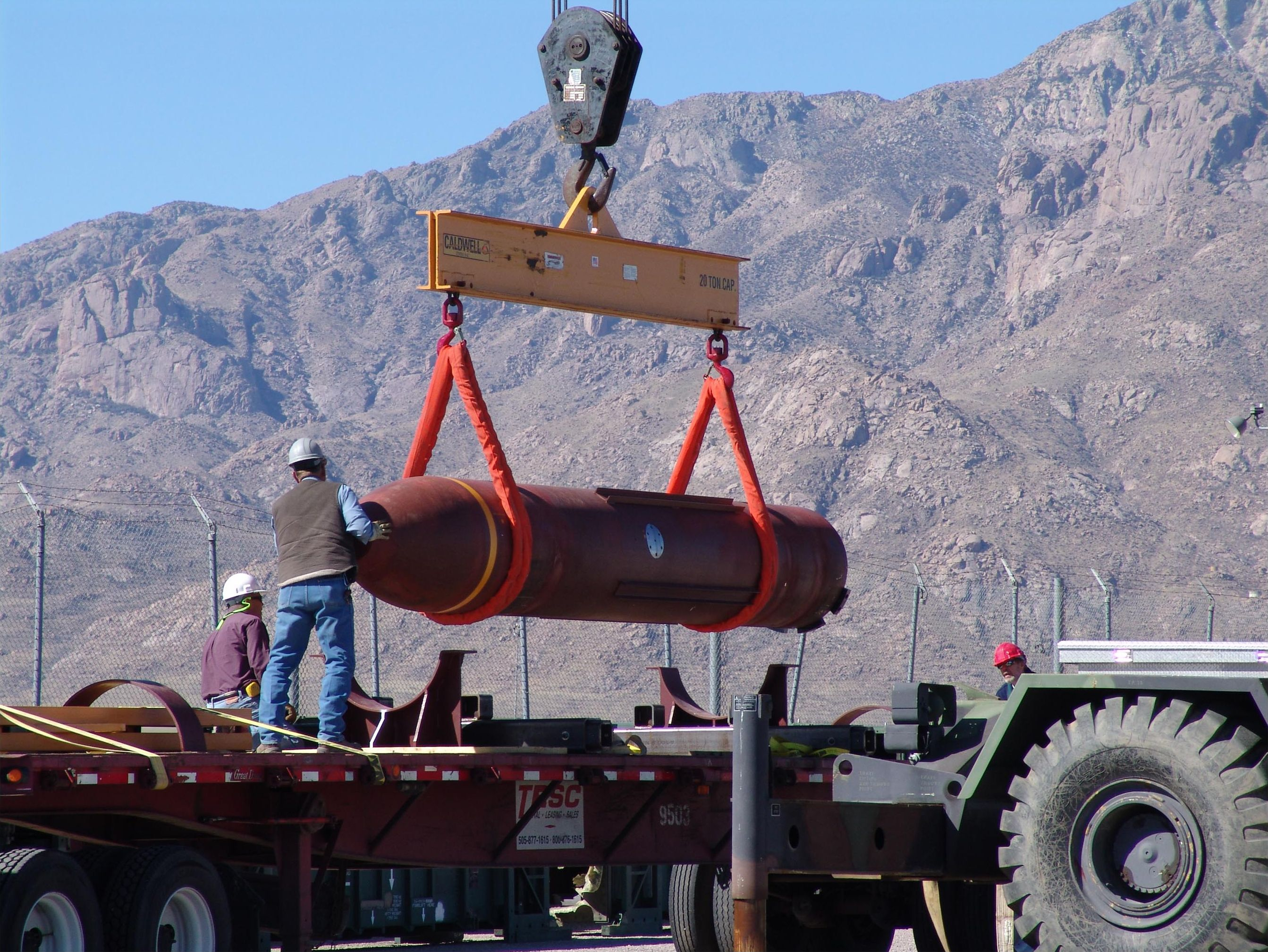
MOP being offloaded in preparation for its first explosive test, 2007.

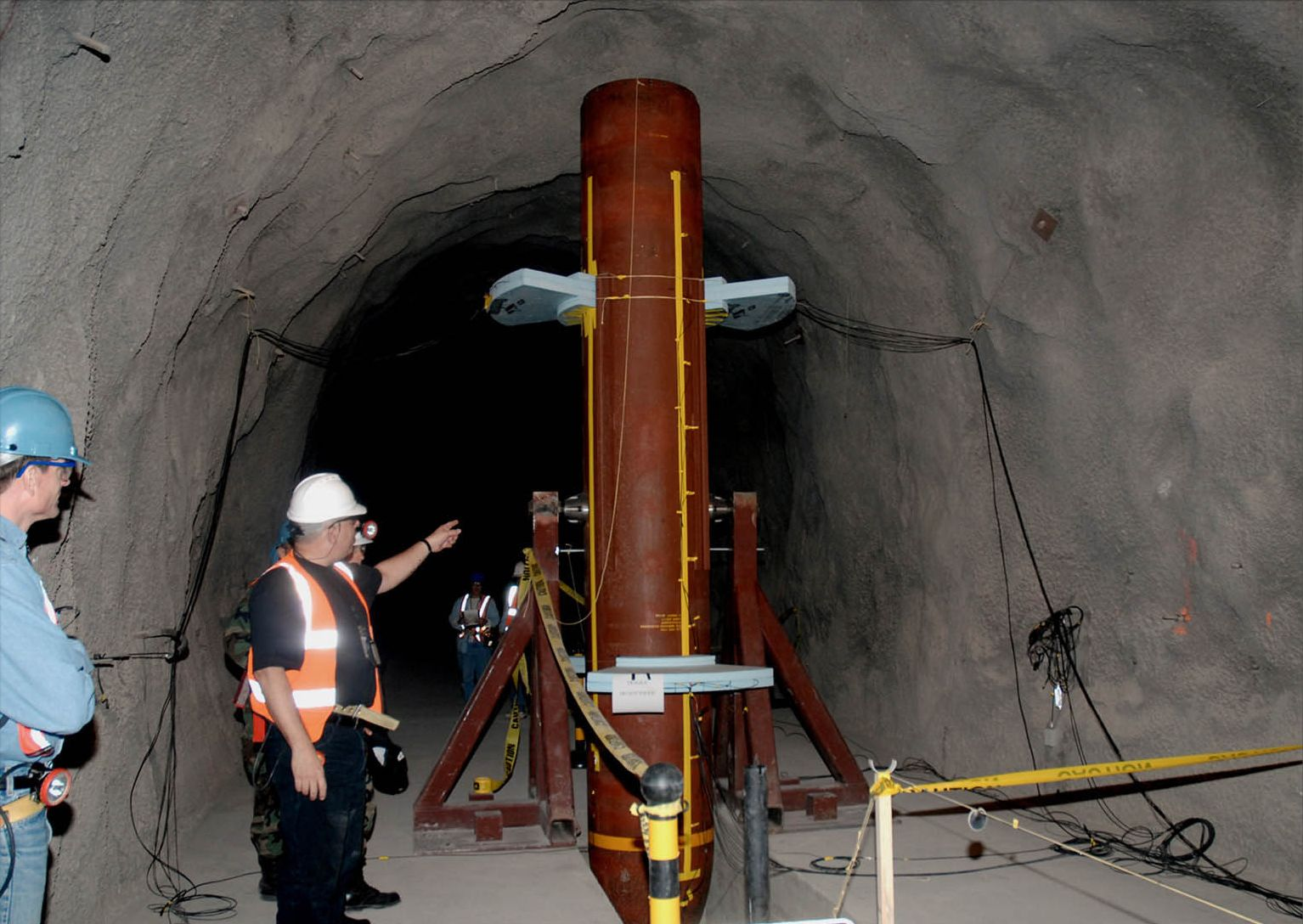
MOP underground at White Sands Missile Range before its first explosive test, 2007.

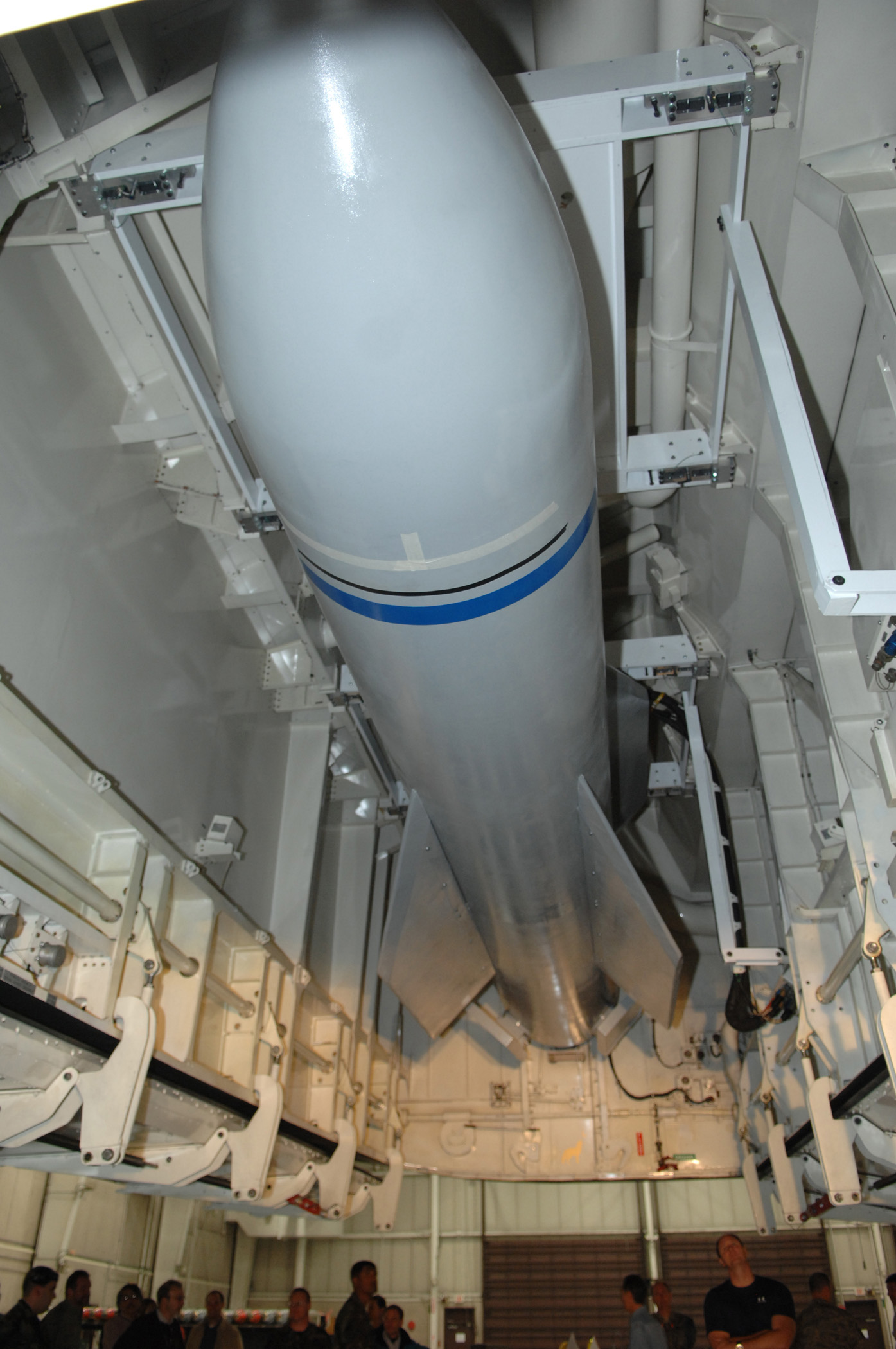
Mock up of MOP inside a bomb bay of a B-2 simulator, 2007.

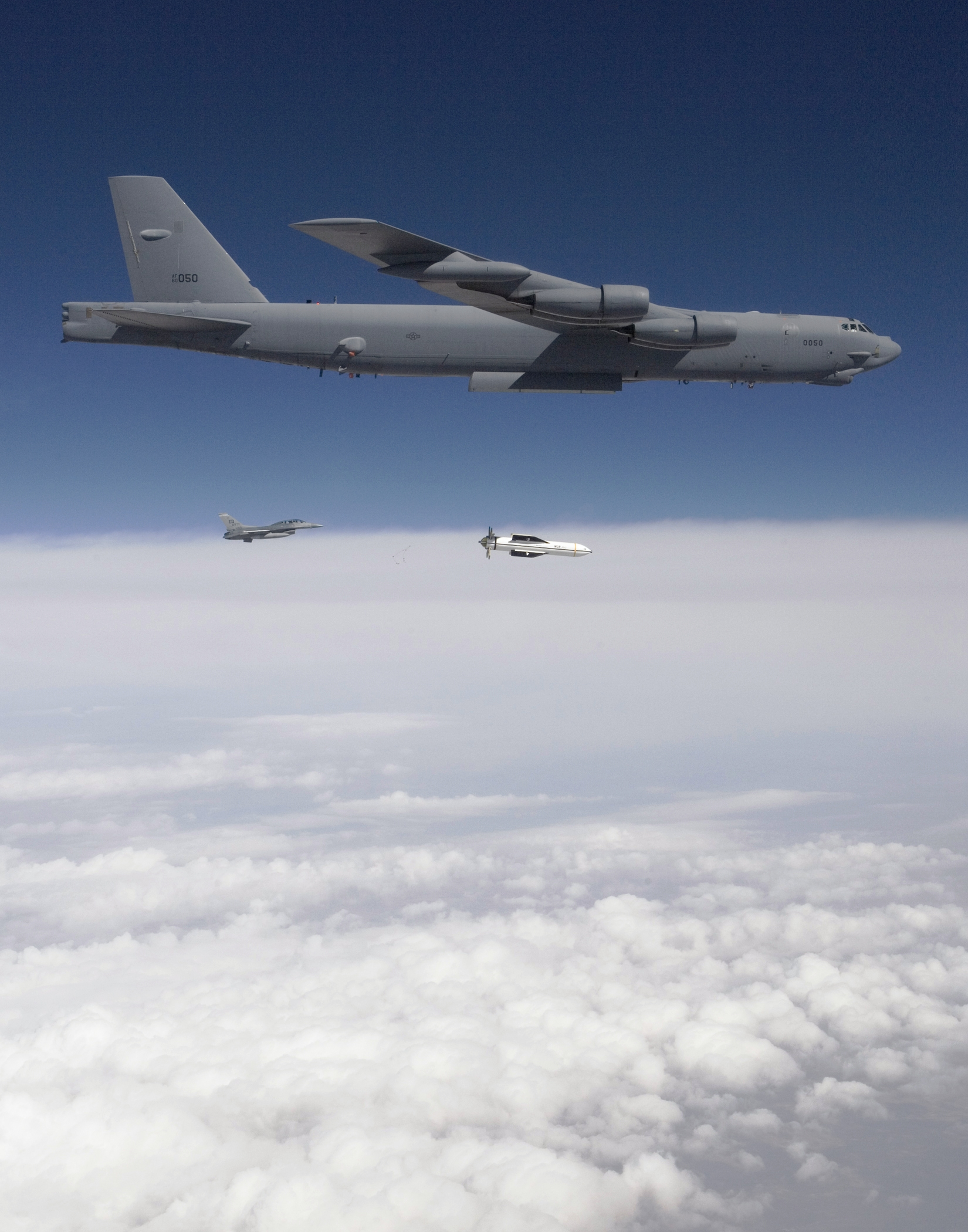
B-52 releases a MOP during a weapons test, 2009.

== See also ==
- Earthquake bomb
- Thermobaric weapon

Specific large bombs

- BLU-82 Daisy Cutter bomb
- Father of All Bombs
- GBU-43/B Mother of All Bombs, another very large US bomb
- Grand Slam (bomb)
- T-12 Cloudmaker
- Tallboy (bomb)
- FAB-9000
