= BLU-82 =

Air-to-surface conventional bomb

BLU-82B/C-130
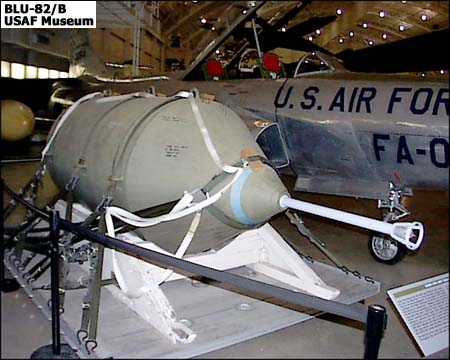
- A 15,000 lb BLU-82/B on display at the National Museum of the United States Air Force
- Type: Air to surface conventional bomb (parachute retarded)
- Place of origin: United States

Service history
- Wars: Vietnam War, Gulf War, and War in Afghanistan

Production history
- No. built: 225

Specifications
- Mass: 15,000 lb (6,800 kg)
- Length: 141.6 in (360 cm)
- Diameter: 56 in (140 cm)
- Filling: GSX Slurry
- Filling weight: 12,600 lb (5,700 kg)

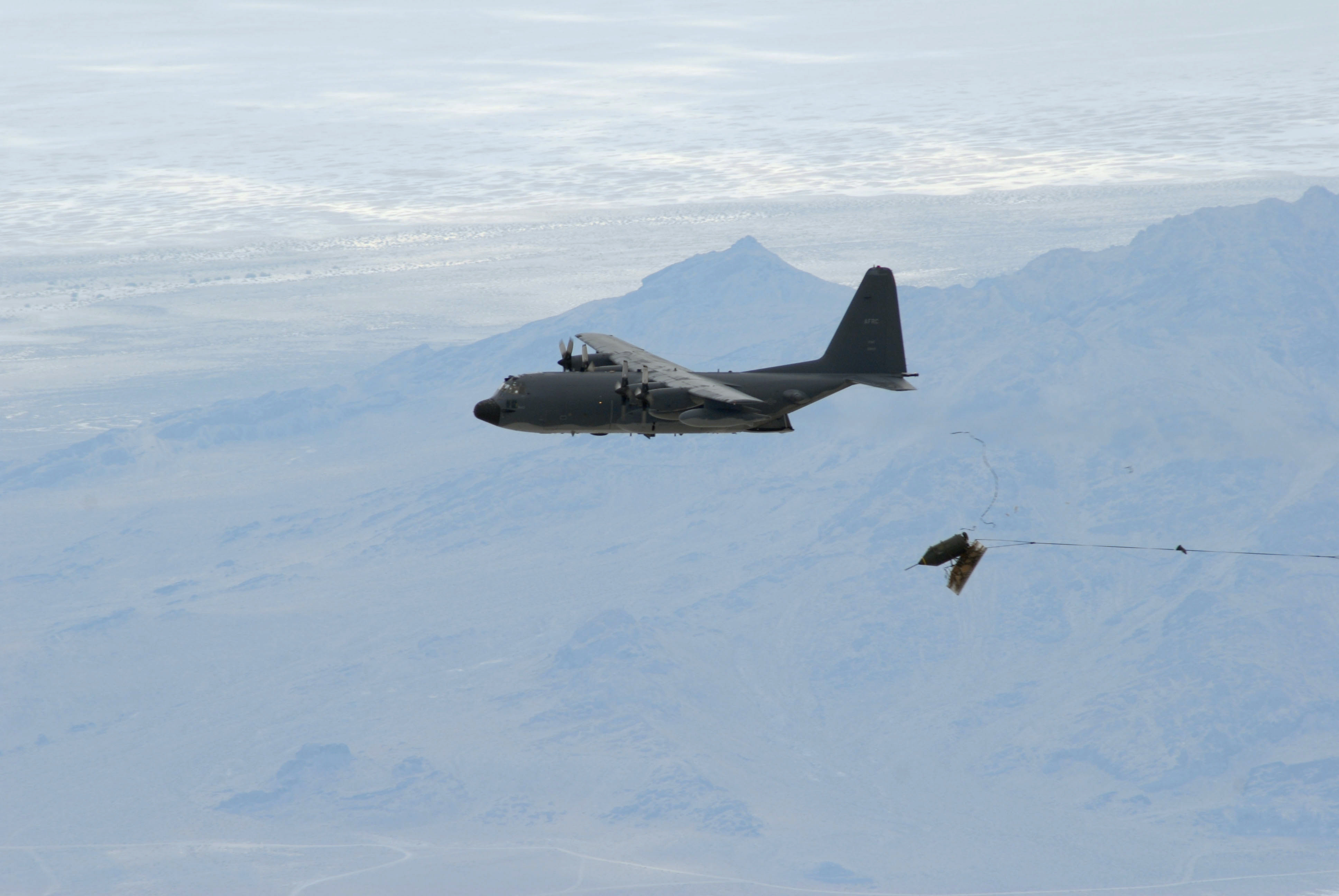
An MC-130E from the 711th Special Operations Squadron, 919th Special Operations Wing, drops the last operational BLU-82 bomb at the Utah Test and Training Range on July 15, 2008.

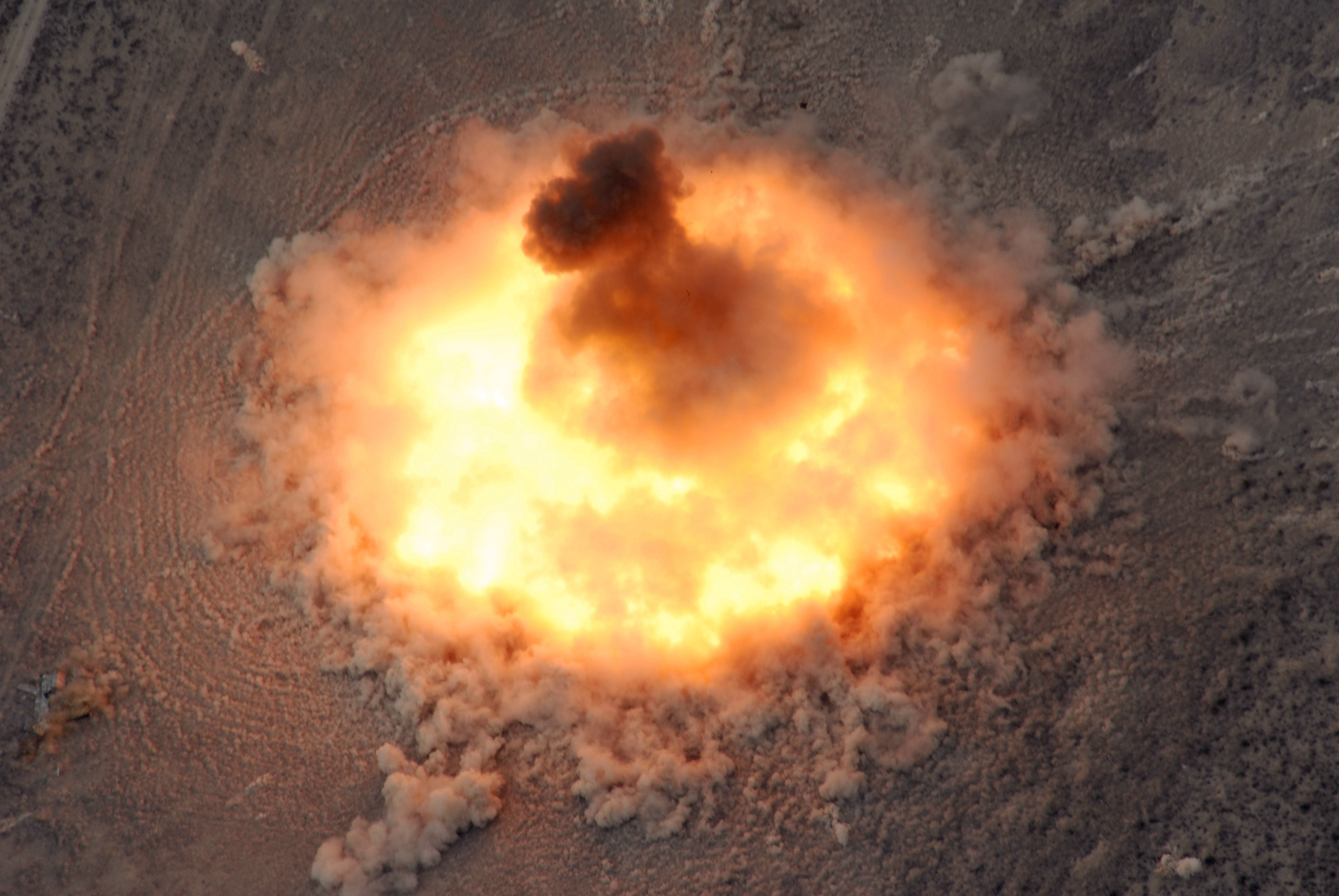
Detonation of the last BLU-82

The BLU-82B/C-130 weapon system, known under program "Commando Vault" and nicknamed "Daisy Cutter" in Vietnam for its ability to flatten a section of forest into a helicopter landing zone, was an American 15,000-pound (6,800 kg) conventional bomb, delivered from either a C-130 or MC-130 transport aircraft or a CH-54 Tarhe heavy-lift helicopter from the 1st Air Cavalry. A total of 225 were constructed. It was successfully used during military operations in Vietnam, the Gulf War and Afghanistan. The BLU-82 was retired in 2008 and replaced with the more powerful GBU-43/B MOAB.

== Overview ==
The designation "BLU" stands for Bomb Live Unit, as opposed to "BDU" (Bomb Dummy Units) used for practice. Originally designed to create an instant clearing in the jungles of Vietnam, the BLU-82B/C-130 was test-dropped there from a CH-54 Tarhe "Flying crane" helicopter. Later it was used in Afghanistan as an anti-personnel weapon and as an intimidation weapon because of its very large blast radius (variously reported as 300 to 900 feet/100 to 300 meters) combined with a visible flash and audible sound at long distances. It is one of the largest conventional weapons ever used, outweighed only by a few earthquake bombs, thermobaric bombs, and demolition (bunker buster) bombs. Some of these include the Grand Slam and T12 earthquake bombs of late World War II, and more currently, the Russian Air Force FOAB and USAF GBU-43/B Massive Ordnance Air Blast bomb, and the Massive Ordnance Penetrator.

== Specifications ==
The BLU-82 uses ammonium nitrate and aluminum (cf. ammonal). The warhead contains 12,600 pounds (5,700 kg) of low-cost GSX slurry (ammonium nitrate, aluminum powder and polystyrene).

The Daisy Cutter has sometimes been incorrectly reported as a fuel-air explosive device (FAE). FAE devices consist of a flammable liquid, gas, or powder and a dispersing mechanism, and take their oxidizers from the oxygen in the air. FAEs generally run between 500 and 2,000 pounds (225 and 900 kg). Making an FAE the size of a Daisy Cutter would be difficult because the correct uniform mixture of the flammable agent with the ambient air would be difficult to maintain if the agent were so widely dispersed. A conventional explosive is much more reliable in that regard, particularly if there is significant wind or thermal gradient.

The BLU-82 produces an overpressure of 1,000 pounds per square inch (6,900 kPa) near ground zero, tapering off as distance increases. It is detonated just above ground by a 38-inch (970 mm) fuze extender. This results in a maximum destruction at ground level without digging a crater.

== Guidance ==
This system depends upon the accurate positioning of the aircraft by either a fixed ground radar or on-board navigation equipment. The ground radar controller, or aircrew navigator if applicable, is responsible for positioning the aircraft prior to final countdown and release. Primary aircrew considerations include accurate ballistic and wind computations provided by the navigator, and precision instrument flying with strict adherence to controller instructions. Due to its extremely powerful blast effects, the minimum safe altitude for releasing this weapon is 6,000 feet (1,800 m) above ground level (AGL).

== Operations ==
The BLU-82 was originally designed to clear helicopter landing zones and artillery emplacements in Vietnam. The first use of a BLU-82 occurred on 22 March 1970, when one was dropped north of Long Tieng, Laos during Campaign 139.

During Operation Lam Son 719 in 1971 25 BLU-82 bombs were dropped on NVA and Pathet Lao forces in Laos. They were dropped by U.S. C-130 aircraft not only to clear landing zones, but also to strike against specific targets such as warehouses, vehicle parks, and enemy troop concentrations.

South Vietnamese VNAF aircraft dropped BLU-82 bombs on NVA positions in desperation to support ARVN troops in the Battle of Xuân Lộc in the last days of the Vietnam War. During the Mayaguez incident, a Lockheed MC-130 dropped one BLU-82 to assist U.S. Marine forces attempting to extract themselves from Koh Tang island.

Eleven BLU-82Bs were palletized and dropped in five night missions during the 1991 Gulf War, all from Special Operations MC-130 Combat Talons. The initial drop tested the ability of the bomb to clear or breach mine fields; however, no reliable assessments of mine clearing effectiveness are publicly available. Later, bombs were dropped as much for their psychological effect as for their anti-personnel effects. Due to the size of the conventional blast, a British SAS unit that witnessed the explosion mistakenly assumed the U.S. had used a nuclear weapon and radioed back to their headquarters exclaiming, "Sir, the blokes have just nuked Kuwait!".

The U.S. Air Force dropped several BLU-82s during the campaign to destroy Taliban and al-Qaeda bases in Afghanistan to attack and demoralize personnel and to destroy cave complexes. American forces began using the bomb in November 2001 and again a month later during the Battle of Tora Bora. On 15 July 2008, airmen from the Duke Field 711th Special Operations Squadron, 919th Special Operations Wing dropped the last operational BLU-82 at the Utah Test and Training Range.

== See also ==
- M121 (bomb)
- Thermobaric weapon
