= Tallboy (bomb) =

Type of earthquake bomb

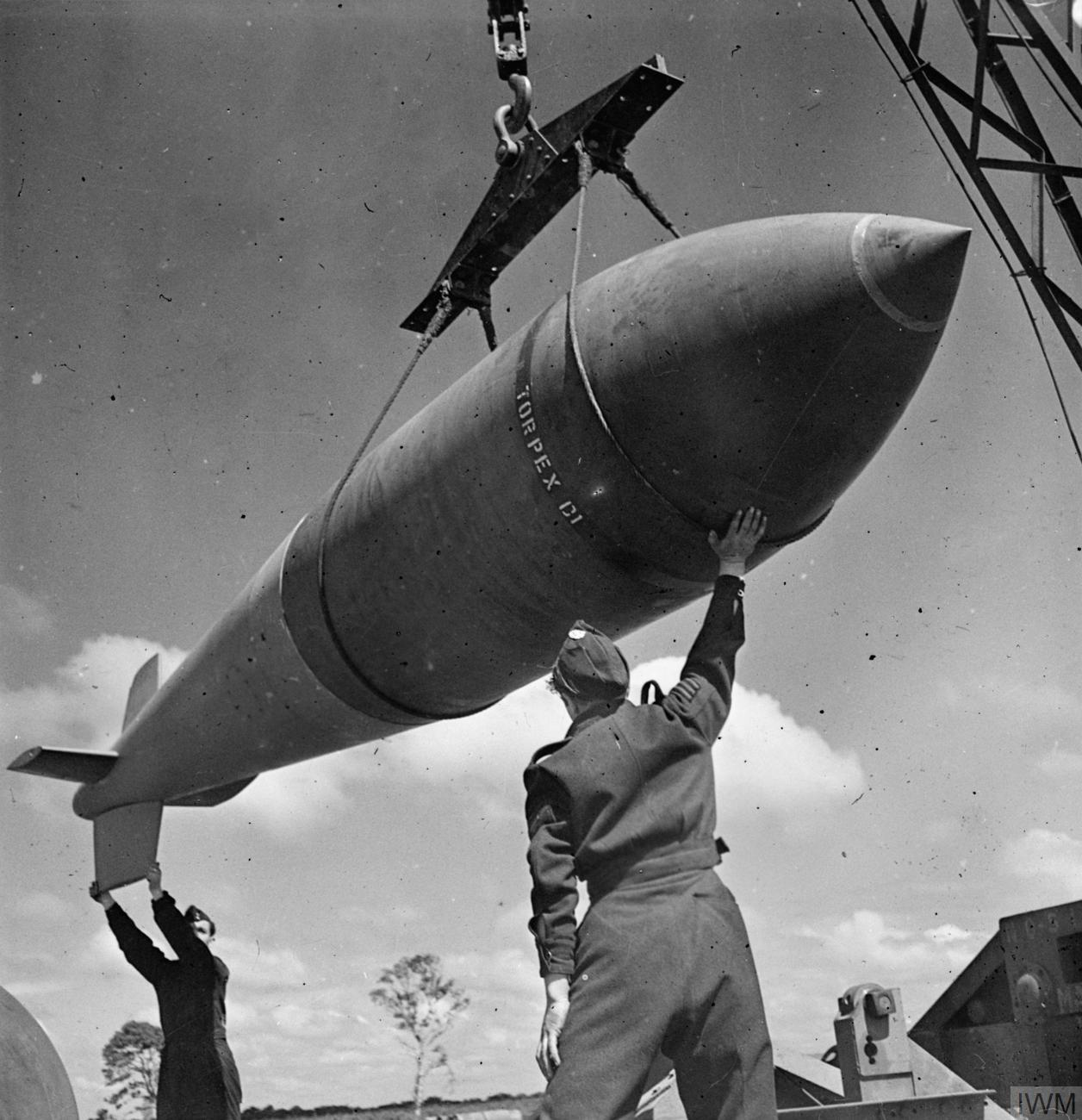
- RAF ground crew handling the Tallboy that was later dropped on the La Coupole V-weapon site at Wizernes, France, 1944
- Type: Earthquake bomb
- Place of origin: United Kingdom

Service history
- In service: 8 June 1944 – 25 April 1945
- Used by: No. 9 Squadron RAF, No. 617 Squadron RAF
- Wars: World War II

Production history
- Designer: Barnes Wallis
- Manufacturer: Vickers
- No. built: 854

Specifications
- Mass: Approx 12,000 lb (5,400 kg)
- Length: 21 ft (6.4 m)
- Diameter: 38 in (97 cm)
- Filling: Torpex D1
- Filling weight: 5,200 lb (2,400 kg)
- Detonation mechanism: No. 58 fuze, built from No. 30 Pistol (impact detonation) or No. 47 time delay fuze inserted into tetryl boosters in the rear of the casing.

Tallboy or Bomb, Medium Capacity, 12,000 lb was an earthquake bomb developed by the British aeronautical engineer Barnes Wallis and used by the Royal Air Force (RAF) during the Second World War. (Note: "Medium capacity" refers to the ratio of bomb case to explosive filling; in the case of the Tallboy, this was less than 50 per cent explosive by weight, in contrast to "high capacity" bombs like the Blockbuster bombs, in which up to three-quarters of their weight was the explosive.)

At 5 long tons (5.1 t), it could be carried only by a modified model of the Avro Lancaster heavy bomber. It proved to be effective against large, fortified structures where conventional bombing had proved ineffective.

== History ==
Wallis presented his ideas for a 10-ton bomb in his 1941 paper "A Note on a Method of Attacking the Axis Powers", which showed that a very large bomb exploding deep underground next to a target would transmit the shock into the foundations of the target, particularly since shock waves are transmitted through the ground more strongly than through air.

Wallis designed the "Victory Bomber" of 50 long tons (51 t), which would fly at 320 mph (510 km/h) at 45,000 ft (14,000 m) to carry the heavy bomb over 4,000 mi (6,400 km), but the Air Ministry opposed a single-bomb aircraft, and the idea was not pursued after 1942.

The design and production of Tallboy was undertaken without a contract on the initiative of the Ministry, following Wallis's 1942 paper "Spherical Bomb—Surface Torpedo" and the design of the "bouncing bomb" for the Dam Busters of Operation Chastise. The RAF therefore used bombs which they had not purchased and which therefore remained the property of Vickers, the manufacturer. This situation was normalised once the weapon’s capabilities were established.

Accomplishments of the Tallboy included the 24 June 1944 Operation Crossbow attack on La Coupole which undermined the foundations of the V-2 assembly bunker, and a Tallboy attack on the Saumur tunnel on 8–9 June 1944, when bombs passed straight through the hill and exploded inside the tunnel 60 ft (18 m) below the surface (stopping Panzer reinforcements reaching Normandy). The last of the Kriegsmarine's Bismarck-class battleships, the Tirpitz, was sunk by an air attack using Tallboys in Operation Catechism.

== Design ==
Most large Allied, particularly British, Second World War aircraft bombs (blockbuster bombs) had very thin skins to maximize the weight of explosive that a bomber could carry. This was an improvement on the bombs available in the early part of the war, when the explosive content of British bombs was low.

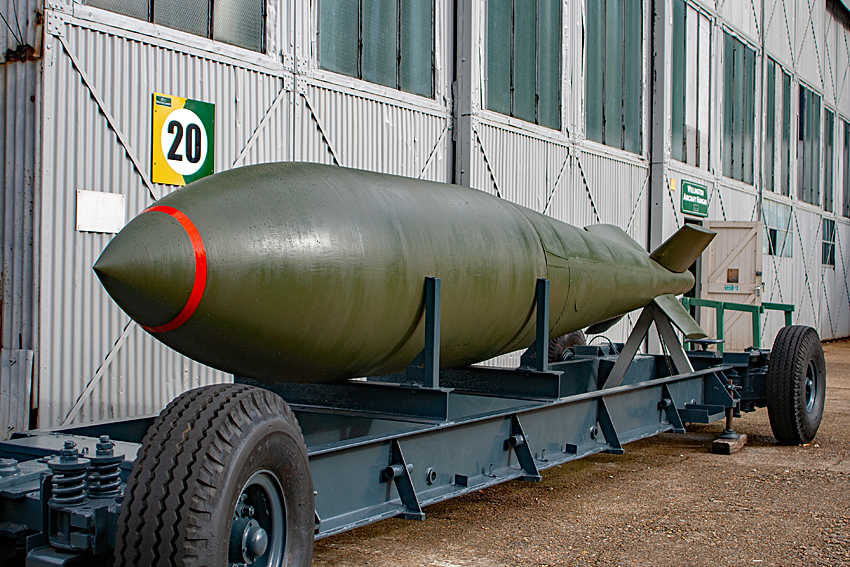
Tallboy earthquake bomb on trailer at Brooklands

To be able to penetrate the earth (or fortified targets) without breaking apart, the casing of the Tallboy had to be strong. Each was cast in one piece of high-tensile steel that would enable it to survive the impact before detonation. At the same time, to achieve the penetration required, Wallis designed the Tallboy to be aerodynamically clean so that, when dropped from a great height, it would reach a much higher terminal velocity than traditional bomb designs.

In the final design, the No. 78 Mark I tail of the bomb was about half the overall length of the finished weapon; the bomb casing was some 10 ft (3.0 m) of the overall 21 ft (6.4 m) length. Initially, the bomb had a tendency to tumble and the tail was modified; the fins were given a slight twist so that the bomb spun as it fell. The gyroscopic effect thus generated stopped the pitching and yawing, improving aerodynamics and accuracy.

The Tallboy was designed to be dropped from an optimal altitude of 18,000 ft (5,500 m) at a forward speed of 170 mph (270 km/h), hitting at 750 mph (1,210 km/h). It made a crater 80 ft (24 m) deep and 100 ft (30 m) across and could go through 16 ft (4.9 m) of concrete.

The weight of the Tallboy (approximately 12,000 lb or 5,400 kg) and the high altitude required of the bombing aircraft meant that the Avro Lancasters used had to be specially adapted. Armour plating and even defensive armament were removed to reduce weight, and the bomb-bay doors had to be adapted.

No. 617 Squadron were trained on the Stabilizing Automatic Bomb Sight (SABS). Corrections had to be made for temperature, wind speed and other factors. The sight was effective only if the target could be clearly identified. Several missions were cancelled or unsuccessful because of this limitation.

For use on underground targets, the bomb was fitted with three separate inertial No. 58 Mark I Tail Pistols (firing mechanisms). These triggered detonation after a pre-set delay, which gave the bomb sufficient time to penetrate the target before exploding. Depending on mission requirements, the time delay could be set to 30 seconds or 30 minutes after impact.

To guarantee detonation, three Type 47 long delay fuzes were fitted inside the rear of the bomb. This dramatically improved reliability of the weapon; even if two of the fuzes failed, the third would trigger detonation. At least two Tallboys failed to explode, one during the second attack on the Sorpe dam; it was found during repairs in late 1958 when the reservoir was emptied, and a second was found in Świnoujście in Poland (formerly Swinemünde) in 2020. This second bomb detonated in October 2020 while being remotely defused.

The bomb proved capable of penetrating deep into hardened reinforced concrete when it hit. This, however, was not the primary intention of Barnes Wallis's design. The bomb was designed to make impact close to the target, penetrate the soil or rock beneath or around the target, and then detonate, transferring all of its energy into the structure, or creating a camouflet (cavern or crater) into which the target would fall. This 'earthquake' effect caused more damage than even a direct hit that penetrated the armour of a target, since even a burst inside a bunker would only damage the surroundings, with the blast dissipating rapidly through the air. An earthquake impact shook the whole target and caused structural damage to all parts of it, making repair uneconomic.

An alternative technique was to arrange detonation depth so that the crater broke the surface—useful for attacking railway marshalling yards and similar targets. The Tallboy produced a 100 ft (30 m) crater with depths up to 80 ft (24 m), unlike conventional bombs which would produce many shallow craters across a target—each one of which could later be filled in rapidly with earth-moving equipment. Such a huge hole was time-consuming to fill; multiple trucks and bulldozers could not be fitted around the periphery of the hole to speed the process.

== Manufacturing ==
Tallboys were largely hand-made, requiring much labour during each manufacturing stage. The materials used were costly, with precise engineering requirements in casting and machining. To increase penetrative power, a large, specially hardened, steel plug had to be precisely machined and mated to a recess in the nose of the bomb. The ogive had to be perfectly symmetrical to ensure optimum aerodynamic performance. This was no easy task when manipulating a bomb casing with the size and weight of a Tallboy.

The Torpex filling was poured by hand into the base of the upturned casing after melting it in "kettles". The final stage of explosive filling required that a one-inch layer of pure TNT be poured over the Torpex filling, followed by sealing the base with a 4 in (100 mm) layer of woodmeal-wax composite with three cylindrical recesses fitted with the explosive boosters and into which three chemical time-fuses were inserted when the bomb was armed.

Tallboys were not considered expendable, and if not used on a raid were to be brought back to base rather than safely jettisoned into the sea due to the bombs being in short supply. Given their high unit cost, Tallboys were used exclusively against high-value strategic targets that could not be destroyed by other means. When it was found that the Lancaster could be modified to carry a bomb larger than the Tallboy, Wallis produced the even larger Grand Slam bomb.

== Operations ==
=== June–August 1944 ===
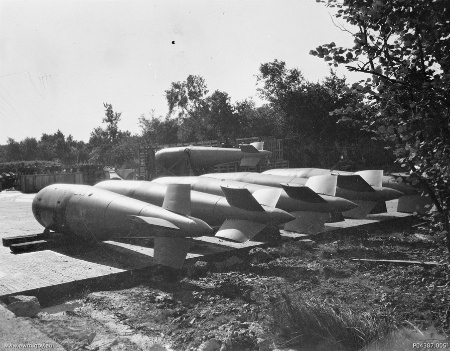
Six Tallboy bombs in a bomb dump at Bardney, Lincolnshire, prior to being loaded on No. 9 Squadron RAF aircraft in October or November 1944

- Nineteen Tallboy-equipped and six conventionally equipped Lancasters of 617 Squadron attacked a railway tunnel near Saumur on the night of 8/9 June 1944. This tunnel was expected to be used for the movement of a German Panzer unit. 617 Squadron were guided on to the target by 83 Squadron Pathfinder Force. This was the first use of the Tallboy bomb, and the line was destroyed—one Tallboy bored through the hillside and exploded in the tunnel about 60 ft (18 m) below, completely blocking it. No aircraft were lost during the raid.

==== Crossbow operations ====
Crossbow was the code name for measures to counter the German V-1 flying bomb ("buzz bomb" or "doodlebug") and V-2 rocket weapons. Tallboys were used by the British to destroy several missile sites.

19 June 1944 – Watten

- The nearest Tallboy dropped by 617 Squadron landed 50 yd (46 m) from the Blockhaus d'Éperlecques target, a heavily fortified V-2 launch site under construction The bunker was rendered useless.

24 June 1944 – Wizernes

- The target was a V-2 assembly and launch site linked with the Watten site. Several Tallboy hits undermined the foundations of La Coupole structure but did not penetrate the dome. The bunker was abandoned.

25 June 1944 – Siracourt V-1 bunker

- Lancasters of 617 Squadron scored three direct hits with Tallboys without loss.

4 July 1944 – Saint-Leu-d'Esserent

- 617 Squadron used seventeen Lancasters with Tallboys, supported by one Mosquito with the master bomber controlling from a Mustang, in an attempt to collapse the limestone roof of the caves used as storage depots. Aircraft from No 5 Group followed up with 1,000 lb (450 kg) bombs.

External image
- Bomb damage at Mimoyecques V-Weapon Site

6 July 1944 – Mimoyecques

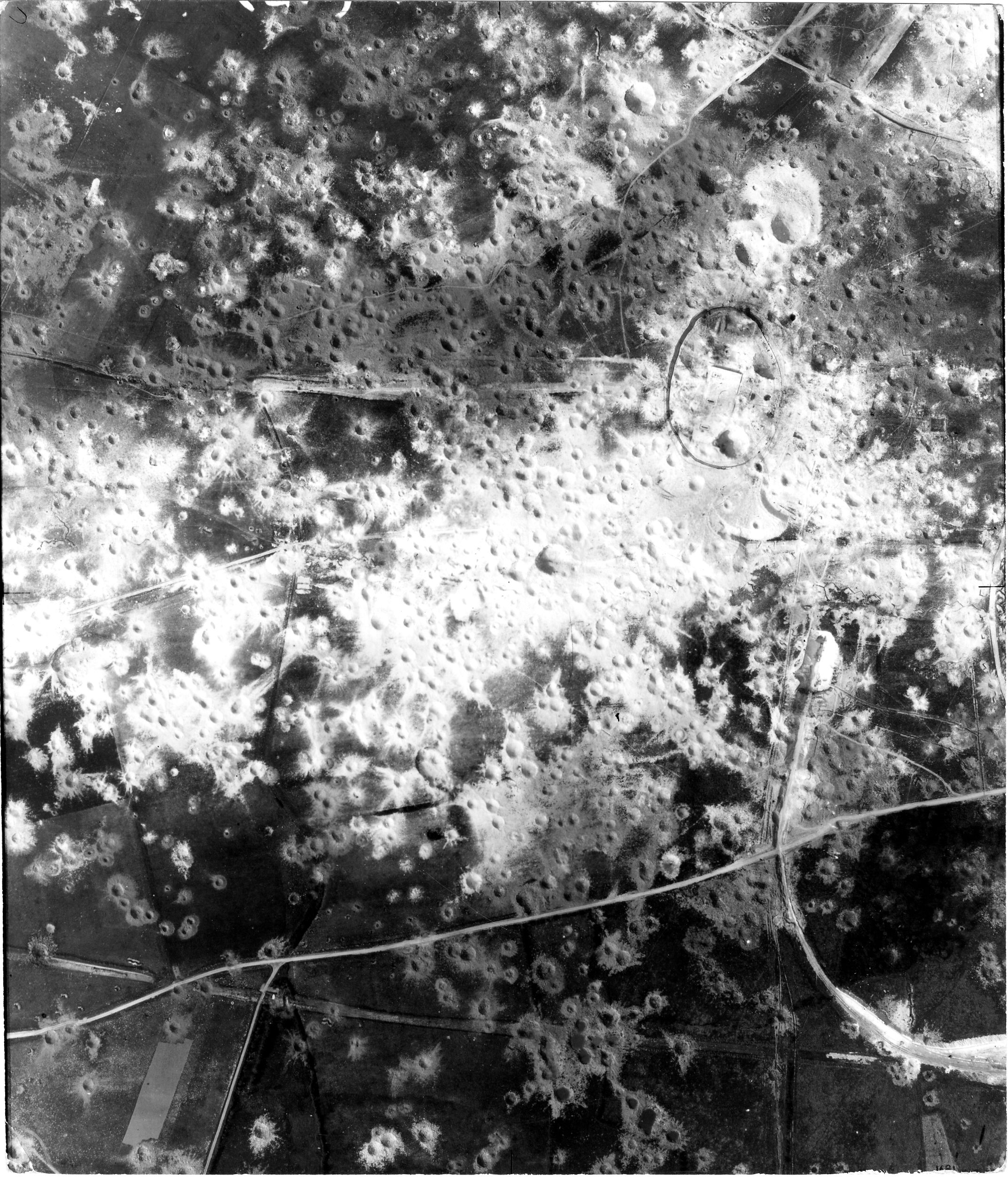
Damage to the Fortress of Mimoyecques from Allied air attacks, including attacks with Tallboy bombs

- Attack on V-weapon targets. Damage was unknown at the time, and efforts continued. In September, allied ground forces found galleries blocked with earth and debris where Tallboys had hit one of the shafts. The V-weapon was revealed to be the V-3 cannon.

17 July 1944 – Wizernes

- 16 Lancasters, led by a Mosquito and a Mustang (Note: Willie Tait had taken over as commanding officer from Leonard Cheshire and continued the practice of marking the target from a single engined aircraft), bombed Wizernes – three Lancasters managed to drop Tallboys (one caused the dome to shift out of alignment, two others blocked the entrance).

27 July 1944 – Watten

- One Tallboy hit the target but did not penetrate the structure.

31 July 1944 – Rilly La Montagne

- Both ends of the railway tunnel were collapsed by Tallboys dropped by 617 Squadron. William Reid's Lancaster at 3,700 m (12,000 ft) was hit by a 'friendly' Tallboy dropped from 5,500 m (18,000 ft).

==== Sorties against German dockyards ====
Shipping in the English Channel and the Atlantic Ocean were threatened by U-boats and E-boats stationed in France. U-boat docks were protected against conventional aerial bombardment by thick concrete roofs.

14 June 1944 – Le Havre

- Part of the first massive RAF daylight raid since the end of May 1943, two waves attacked E-boat facilities at Le Havre: No 1 Group first, No 3 Group second. Just before the first wave, 22 Lancasters of 617 Squadron and 3 Mosquito marker aircraft attacked, several hits were scored on the pens, one bomb penetrated the roof.

15 June 1944 – Boulogne harbour

- 297 aircraft: 155 Lancasters, 130 Halifaxes, 12 Mosquitos, of Nos 1, 4, 5, 6 and 8 Groups attacked Boulogne harbour. One Halifax was lost. A French report described the great destruction as the worst raid on Boulogne. During the raid 22 Lancasters of No. 617 squadron bombed the E-boat pens with Tallboys. Due to cloud cover ten planes returned to base with their bombs. However, the raid was considered a success as the E-boats retired to IJmuiden on the Dutch coast, where they were better protected but less able to interfere with Allied naval traffic supporting the Normandy invasion.

5 August 1944 – Brest

- 15 Lancasters of 617 Squadron attacked the U-boat pens at Brest and scored six direct hits with Tallboys, penetrating the concrete roofs. One Lancaster was shot down by flak. Subsequent attempts to reinforce other sites with even thicker concrete diverted resources from other projects.

6 August 1944 – Keroman

- Flight Lieutenant Thomas Clifford Iveson dropped one Tallboy, bomb failed to penetrate base.

7 August 1944 – Lorient

- The planned Tallboy mission against the U-boat pens was cancelled. Instead Keroman Submarine Base was the primary target.

8 August 1944 – La Pallice

- Flight Lieutenant Thomas Iveson dropped one Tallboy.

28 August 1944 – IJmuiden

- Iveson dropped one Tallboy.

=== September–November 1944 ===
23/24 September 1944 – Dortmund-Ems Canal near Ladbergen, north of Münster

- During the night attack 617 Squadron scored six direct hits with Tallboys.

7 October 1944 – Kembs Dam north of Basel

- The dam waters could have been kept in reserve to flood the area of a US advance. The Dambusters destroyed the lock gates with Tallboys dropped at low level, releasing the stored water.

15 October 1944 – Sorpe dam

- Target of the original Dambusters raid survived a second attack by 9 Squadron (617 Squadron did not participate in this raid). The Tallboy bombs were seen to hit the dam but did not breach it. (Note: A Tallboy was found during renovation works on the Sorpe Dam, Germany in 1958. The bomb was defused on 6 January 1959 by a German and British crew of demining officers.)

==== Raids on Tirpitz ====
The German battleship Tirpitz was a threat against convoys sailing to and from the Soviet Union.

15 September 1944 – (Operation Paravane)

- One Tallboy hit near the bow of the Tirpitz, passing through the foredeck and hull, and exploded in the water on the starboard side of her bow. The blast wrecked the bow, and left the battleship's forward compartments flooded with 2,000 tons of water. The explosions of several other Tallboys in the water near Tirpitz also buckled some of her hull plates and bulkheads. Five men were killed and fifteen wounded. Tirpitz was rendered unseaworthy, and the damage was assessed as needing nine months' worth of work to repair, but this was considered unfeasible, so the battleship was relegated to a floating artillery battery.

29 October 1944 – (Operation Obviate)

- Due to cloud coming in just before the attack, 32 bombs were dropped "blind". No direct hits were scored but one near miss bent a propeller shaft.

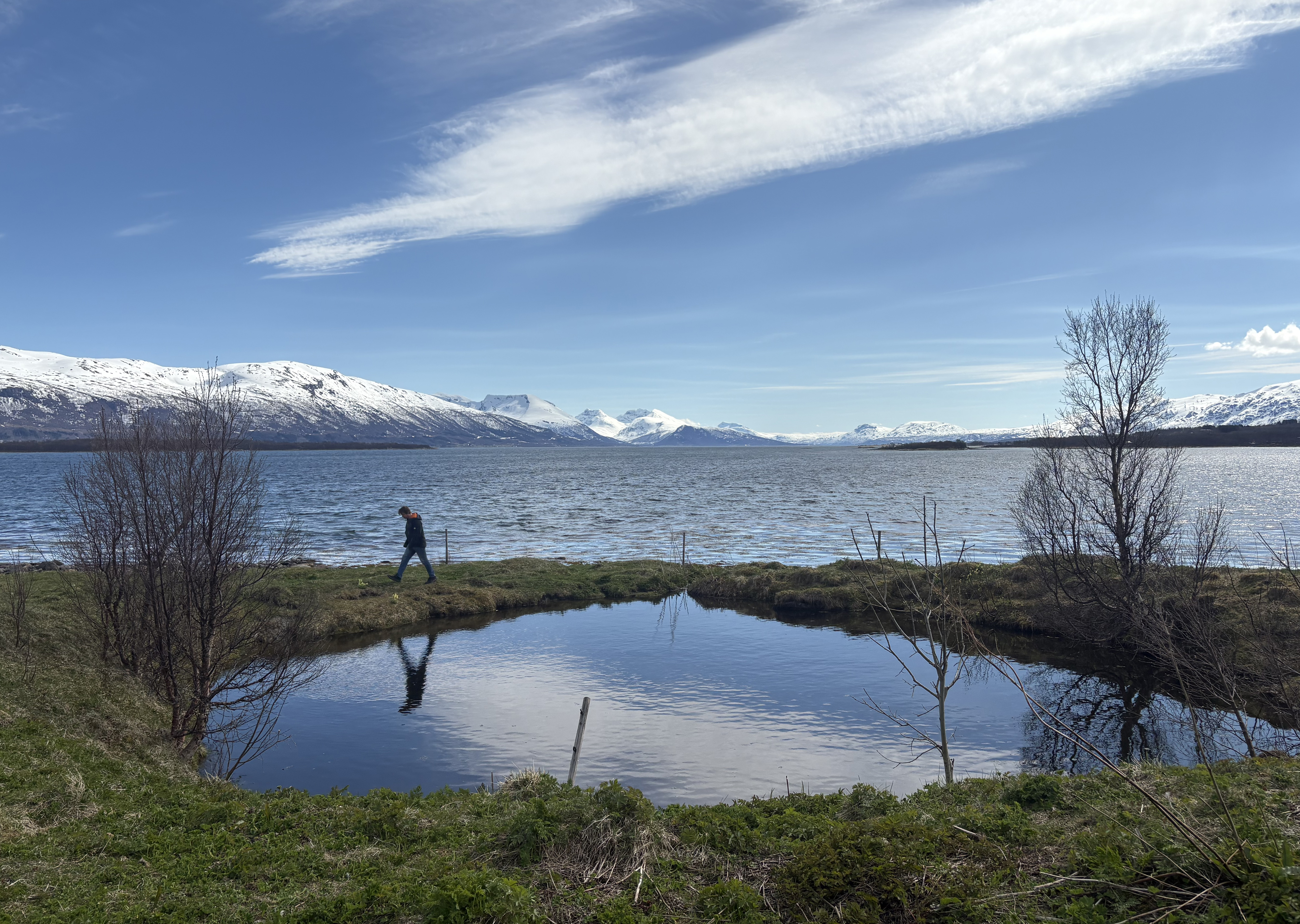
Flooded crater on Håkøya in Tromsø created by a Tallboy which missed battleship Tirpitz

12 November 1944 – (Operation Catechism)

- In the final operation the Tirpitz was sunk by three Tallboy hits, and several others fell close by. Several bombs landed within the anti-torpedo net barrier and caused significant cratering of the seabed, removing much of the sandbank that had been constructed to prevent the ship from capsizing. One bomb penetrated the ship's deck between turrets Anton and Bruno but failed to explode. A second hit amidships between the aircraft catapult and the funnel, destroying the entire section of belt armour abreast of the bomb hit and blowing a very large hole in the ship's side and bottom, causing significant flooding and a port list to 60 degrees. A third bomb struck the ship on the port side of turret Caesar, eventually leading to a magazine explosion that caused the ship to capsize.

=== December 1944 – April 1945 ===
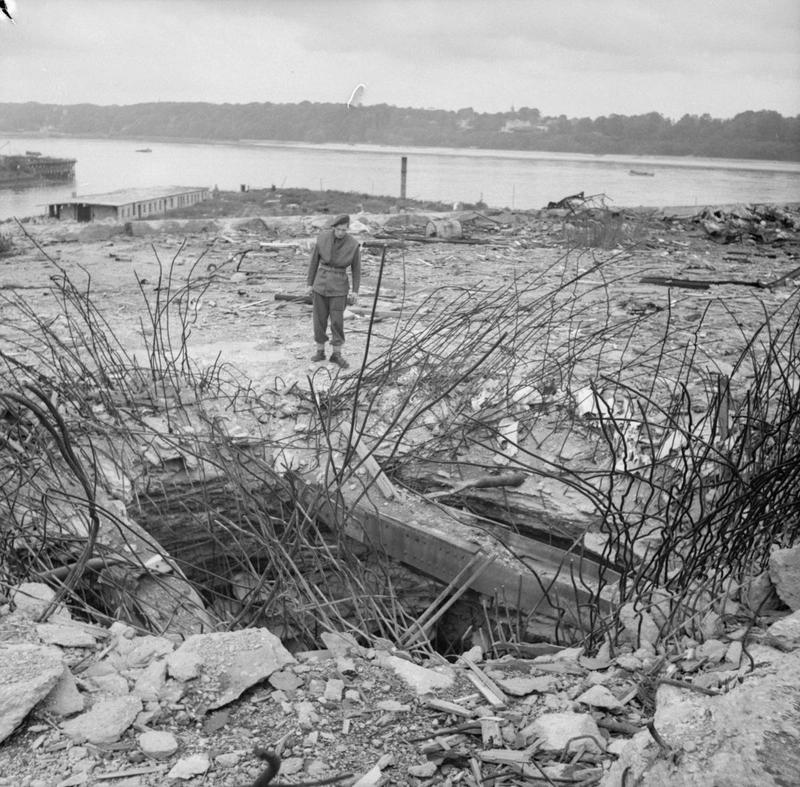
The 11-foot-thick (3.4 m) concrete roof of submarine bunker "Fink II" in Hamburg, after having been penetrated by a Tallboy in early April 1945

Bombing of U-boat and E-boat pens, December 1944 – April 1945

8 December, 11 December 1944

- The Urft Dam (30 mi (48 km) southwest of Cologne) was attacked to prevent it being used to flood the area as American troops advanced. The lip of the dam was damaged, but the Germans prevented further damage by lowering the water level.

15 December 1944 – Ijmuiden on the Dutch coast,

- 617 Squadron attacked E-boat pens with Tallboys. A smokescreen hindered the bombing, and the results went unseen.

21 December 1944 – Politz

- 617 Squadron.

12 January 1945 – Bergen

- 32 Lancasters and one Mosquito of Nos 9 and 617 Squadrons attacked U-boat pens and shipping in Bergen harbour. Three Lancasters of 617 Squadron and one from 9 Squadron were lost; the Germans told the local people that 11 bombers had been shot down. A local report said that three Tallboys penetrated the 3 1/2-metre-thick (11 ft) roof of the pens and caused severe damage to workshops, offices and stores inside".

3 February 1945 – IJmuiden & Poortershaven

- 36 Lancasters of No 5 Group attacked U-boat pens at IJmuiden (9 Squadron) and Poortershaven (617 Squadron) with Tallboys. Hits were claimed on both targets without loss.

14 March 1945 – Bielefeld and Arnsberg viaducts

- The viaducts were attacked by 617 and 9 squadrons with Tallboys and the first Grand Slams. The Arnsberg viaduct withstood the attack but 100 m (330 ft) of the Bielefeld viaduct collapsed through the 'earthquake effect' of the Grand Slams and Tallboys.

15 March 1945 – Arnsberg viaduct

- Arnsberg viaduct was attacked again by 9 Squadron. It did not collapse.

9 April 1945 – Hamburg

- 617 Squadron attacked with Tallboys and Grand Slams. Some of the bombs hit their target and no aircraft were lost.

9 April 1945 – pocket battleship Admiral Scheer

- Admiral Scheer was attacked by RAF bombers equipped with Tallboys when she was docked in Kiel. 5 Tallboys hit her and she capsized in the harbour.

16 April 1945 – heavy cruiser Lützow

- Lützow was attacked by 617 Squadron. Despite intense flak, 15 aircraft managed to bomb the target with Tallboys or with 1,000 lb (450 kg) bombs. One near miss with a Tallboy tore a large hole in the bottom of the Lützow and she settled to the bottom in shallow water. One Lancaster was shot down, the Squadron's last loss of the war. One of the bombs remained sunk near Świnoujście in the middle of main shipping Piast Canal for 74 years, unearthed during the preparatory works for deepening of the Świnoujście-Szczecin fairway in September 2019. Operations to defuse and remove it were undertaken in October 2020. It exploded during defusing, but without causing any injuries.

18 April 1945 – Heligoland

- 969 aircraft: 617 Lancasters, 332 Halifaxes and 20 Mosquitos of all groups bombed the naval base, airfield and town "almost into crater-pitted moonscapes". Three Halifaxes were lost; the islands were evacuated the following night.

19 April 1945 – Heligoland

- 36 Lancasters used Tallboy bombs against coastal positions.

25 April 1945 – Berghof

- Hitler's vacation home, the Berghof, near Berchtesgaden was attacked with a mixed force that included six Lancasters of 617 Squadron dropping their last Tallboys. The bombing appeared to be accurate and effective.

== Post-war influence on bomber design ==
The last of the V bombers, the Handley Page Victor, was designed to be able to carry a bomb load that could include two Tallboys internally, or one Grand Slam plus assorted smaller weapons.

== United States use ==
The T-10 was an American-made version of the 12,000 lb (5,443 kg) Tallboy modified to use standard American components. Development was started in late 1944 and plans were made to drop them on the island strongholds of the Pacific to aid in softening their defences before amphibious assaults. No bombs were used operationally since the capitulation of Japan following the atomic bombings of Hiroshima and Nagasaki negated their need. In the late 1950s the T-10 was re-designated the M121. During the Korean War a number of T-10s were converted to the radio-guided Tarzon bomb and were dropped by Boeing B-29 Superfortresses to destroy railroad bridges and reservoir dams.

After the Korean War ended and the B-29 and B-36 bombers were retired, the United States Air Force no longer had an aircraft that could drop the M-121, and the bombs were put in storage. Production of the T-10 ended in 1955. The B-36 was the last operational aircraft that could drop a fully assembled Tallboy type bomb in the conventional way. (Note: The B-52 bomb bay lacked the length required to load a Tallboy.) During the Vietnam War, some M-121s, minus their rear streamlined shrouds and tail fin assemblies, were shipped to Vietnam for Commando Vault missions where the warheads were incorporated into the BLU-82 weapons dropped by C-130s using radar control in order to clear a helicopter landing zone. The warheads were mounted on a platform and pulled by parachutes from the rear-loading ramp of C-130s. After clearing the aircraft, the large extraction chutes and pallets were cut away and small triangular chutes stabilized the large warhead until impact. A three-foot (91 cm) nose probe detonated the bomb at the correct stand-off distance. One of the last of the World War II Tallboy designs was dropped during a Commando Vault mission to clear a landing zone for helicopters on a ridge during the 1969 Battle of Hamburger Hill in Vietnam. Dropping from 3,000 m (10,000 ft), the bomb hit exactly where it was needed. The Commando Vault missions were more accurate in bomb delivery on target than the more modern B-52s. (Note: The use of any type or make of the Tallboy ended with the Vietnam War. No bombs were dropped during the Gulf War in 1991 as none were in storage for the USAF. The large bombs dropped by C-130s during the Gulf War in 1991 were of the 6,800 kg (15,000 lb) type BLU-82.)

Work still progressed on the 43,000 lb (20,000 kg) T-12 Cloudmaker, which could be carried by the Convair B-36A.

== See also ==
- ASM-A-1 Tarzon
- Bunker buster
- Grand Slam

== Notes ==
}
