= T-12 Cloudmaker =

US seismic bomb deployed from 1948 to 1958

T-12 Cloudmaker General Purpose bomb
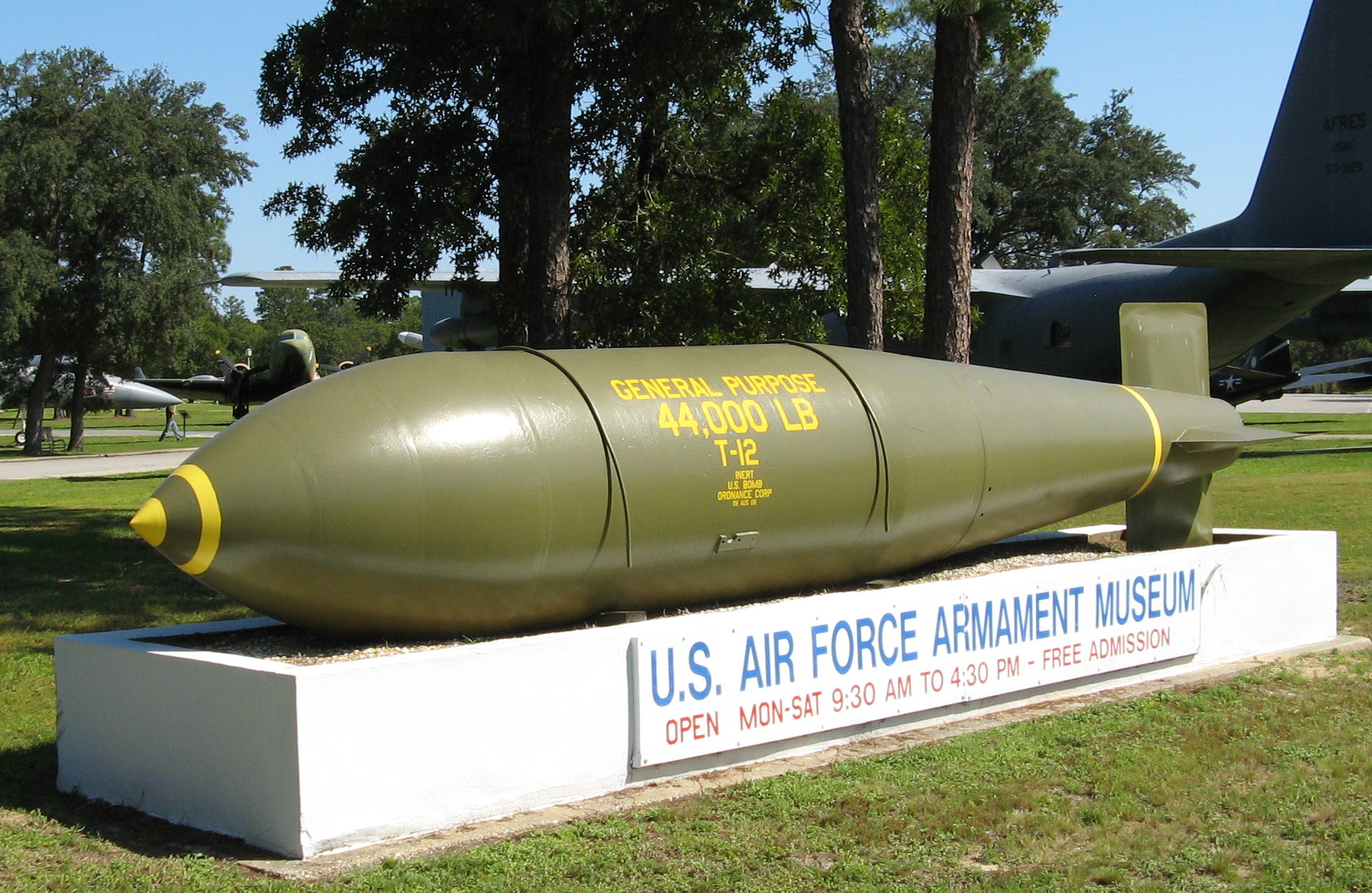
- T-12 casing at the Air Force Armament Museum, Florida
- Type: Earthquake bomb
- Place of origin: United States

Service history
- In service: 1949 - 1958
- Used by: United States Air Force
- Wars: None

Production history
- Designed: 1944
- Produced: 1944–1948

Specifications
- Mass: 44,000 lb (20,000 kg)
- Filling: Tritonal
- Filling weight: 8,000 kg (18,000 lb)
- Blast yield: 9.44 t (9.29 long tons; 10.41 short tons) TNT equivalent

The T-12 (also known as Cloudmaker) was a 44,000 lb (20 t) tritonal-filled, nose-hardened earthquake bomb developed by the United States from 1944 to 1948 and deployed between 1949 and the withdrawal of the Convair B-36 Peacemaker bomber aircraft in 1958. It was one of a small class of bombs designed to attack targets invulnerable to conventional bombs, such as bunkers and viaducts. It achieved this by having an extremely thick, hardened nose section designed to penetrate deeply into the earth before exploding and then damage the target by the resulting shock wave.

== Development ==
The T-12 was a further development of the concept initiated during World War II with the United Kingdom's Tallboy and Grand Slam weapons developed by British aeronautical engineer Barnes Wallis: a hardened, highly aerodynamic bomb of the greatest possible weight designed to be dropped from the highest possible altitude. Penetrating deeply in the earth before exploding, the resulting shock wave was transmitted through the earth into targets. The resulting underground cavity and ground motion could also undermine structures. The bomb could also be used against hardened targets.

These types of bombs can reach supersonic speeds and have tail fins designed to spin the bomb for greater accuracy.

Originally designed to meet a 42,000 lb (19,000 kg) target weight (one half of the maximum payload for the Convair B-36 "Peacemaker" bomber), with its hardened case the bomb weighed slightly less than 43,000 lb (19,500 kg). The final T-12 weighed 43,600 lb (19,800 kg). This was twice the size of the United States' previous largest bomb, the 22,000 lb (10,000 kg) M110 (T-14), the American-built version of the British Grand Slam. The T-12 was not a simple scale up of the M110, but incorporated modifications based on testing and calculations. The B-36 was redesigned so it could carry the T-12, although a converted B-29 Superfortress was used for testing.

== See also ==
- Aviation Thermobaric Bomb of Increased Power
- BLU-82
- Bunker buster
- Grand Slam bomb
- Massive Ordnance Penetrator
- MOAB
