= M121 (bomb) =

Air-to-surface conventional bomb

The M121 was a very large air dropped bomb used by the U.S. military during the Vietnam War. Originally developed from the British World War II-era Tallboy bomb to be dropped from the Convair B-36 bomber, it weighed 10,000 lb (4,500 kg) and contained an 8,050 lb (3,650 kg) Tritonal warhead. Production of the M121 ceased in 1955, but stockpiles were retained until the Vietnam War.

== Vietnam War ==
In December 1967, the U.S. Air Force began a testing program to use large bombs for explosively clearing jungle areas for landing of helicopters. After tests in the United States, the U.S. Army began dropping the bombs using CH-54 helicopters. Use of the helicopters was expensive, time consuming and inefficient due to the CH-54's limited range. In October 1968, a C-130 crew from the 29th Tactical Airlift Squadron of the 463rd Tactical Airlift Wing flew a series of test drops while under the guidance of MSQ-77 radar controllers; additional test drops were made in December. In March 1969, the 463rd commenced Project Commando Vault, and bomb drops became a regular occurrence. Besides clearing the jungle and preventing the ambush of helicopters that were approaching the landing zone (the M121's blast diameter was 60 meters), the explosion also stunned the NVA or Viet Cong personnel within 500 meters and revealed or destroyed booby traps in the landing area.

Due to the bomb's weight and powerful effects, ordnance handlers would chalk mark the bombs as "Excedrin Headache #10,00x" where x was the sequence number of the bomb; a reference to the well known (at the time) advertising campaign promoting the efficacy of the Excedrin brand of extra strength pain relievers.

Use of the M121 to clear a jungle zone was a technical success, but the weapon did not satisfy MACV's command requirement to clear a jungle area for five helicopters at the same time. Despite this, the United States continued to use the M121 to clear helicopter landing zones in the jungle until stockpiles were depleted while a more powerful bomb was developed for jungle-clearing purposes. The new BLU-82, developed in 1969, entered service later in the Commando Vault program. Unlike the M121, which used TNT, the BLU-82 used a slurry mixture of ammonium nitrate and powdered aluminum. It had a slightly bigger blast diameter (80 meters).
