= GBU-37 GPS-Aided Munition =

American GPS-guided "bunker buster" bomb

GBU-37 GPS Aided Munition
- Type: "Bunker buster" bomb
- Place of origin: United States

Service history
- Used by: United States Air Force

Production history
- Manufacturer: Northrop Grumman
- Variants: GBU-36

Specifications
- Mass: 4,700 pounds (2,100 kg)
- Length: 17 feet (5.2 m)
- Diameter: 31 inches (0.79 m)
- Effective firing range: 5 nautical miles (9.3 km)

The GBU-37 (Guided Bomb Unit-37) Global Positioning System Aided Munition (GAM) was developed for use with the B-2 Bomber. The bomb can penetrate hardened targets or targets buried deep underground. The first all-weather precision-guided bunker buster, it became operational in 1997..

The GPS Aided Target System (GATS) is a B-2 targeting system that makes it easier to find targets, even in bad weather. It uses the B-2's GPS and radar abilities together to pinpoint targets very accurately based on where the B-2 is right now. This helps the B-2 bomber hit targets more precisely.
