= Bunker buster =

Munition for penetrating hardened or deeply buried targets

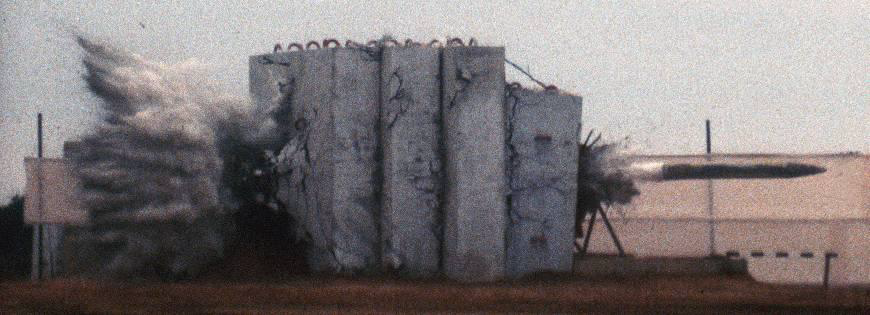
US-made bunker buster BLU-122 on a weapons test

Test footage of the US-made GBU-57 Massive Ordinance Penetrator bunker buster bomb.

A bunker buster is a type of munition that is designed to penetrate hardened targets or targets buried deep underground, such as military bunkers. The U.S. Department of Defense refers to these targets as "hard and deeply buried targets"

== Armor piercing shells ==
Röchling shells were bunker-busting artillery shells, developed by the German engineer August Coenders, based on the theory of increasing sectional density to improve penetration. They were tested in 1942 and 1943 against the Belgian Fort d'Aubin-Neufchâteau.

== Aircraft delivered bombs ==
=== World War II ===
==== Germany ====
In World War II the Luftwaffe developed a series of unguided rocket-propelled armor-piercing bombs for use against shipping and fortifications.

==== United Kingdom ====
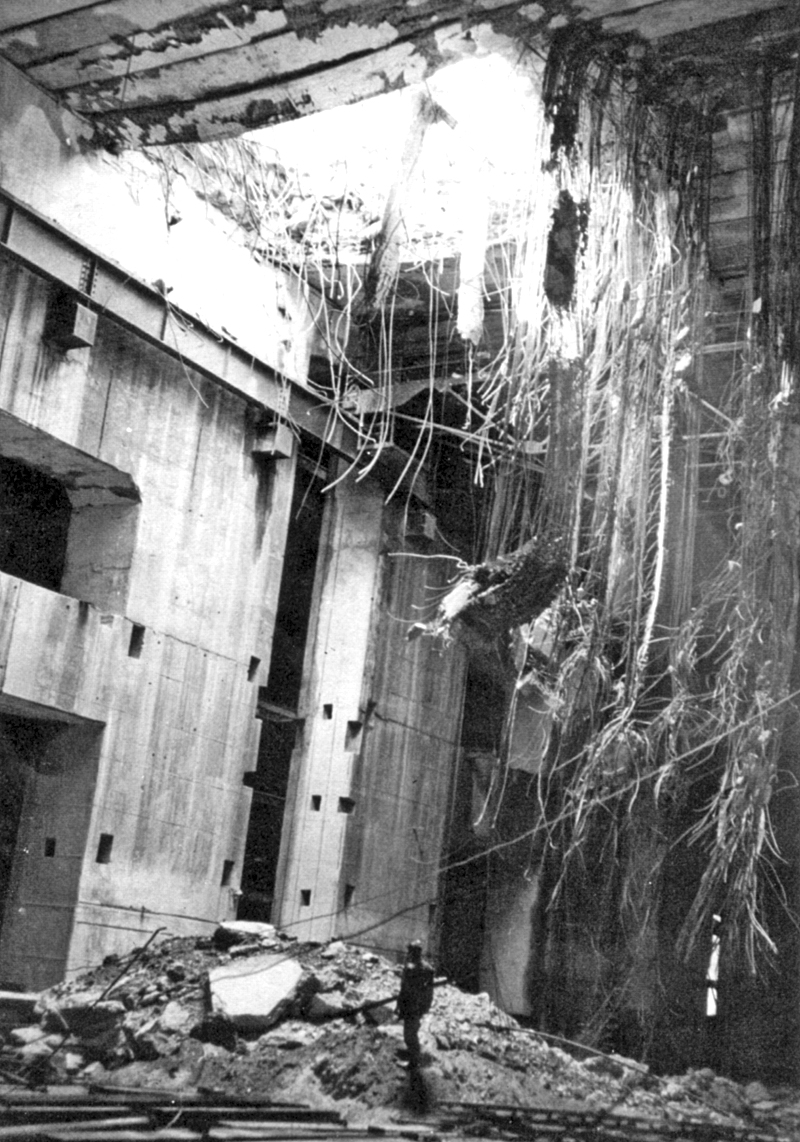
A U-Boat pen after being hit by a Grand Slam.

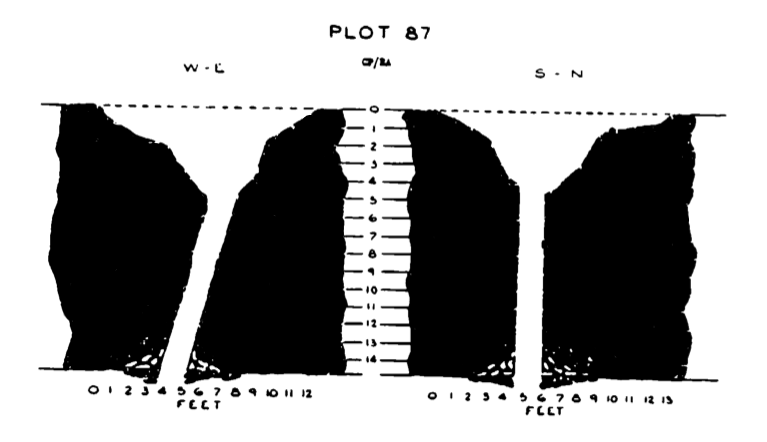
Diagram of a roof penetration produced by a Disney bomb striking the German, Valentin U-boat pen. The bomb was one of a number dropped on the bunker during post-war testing

In World War II, the British designer Barnes Wallis, already famous for inventing the bouncing bomb, designed two bombs that would become the conceptual predecessors of modern bunker busters: the five tonne Tallboy and the ten tonne Grand Slam. These were "Earthquake" bombs—a concept he had first proposed in 1939. The designs were very aerodynamic, allowing them to exceed the speed of sound as they fell from 22,000 ft (6,700 m). The tails were designed with offset fins causing the bombs to spin as they fell. Using the same principle as a spinning top, this enabled them to resist being deflected, thereby improving accuracy. They had casings of high grade steel, much stronger than the typical World War II bomb so that they would survive hitting a hardened surface, or penetrate deep into the ground.

Though these bombs might be thought of as "bunker busters" today, the original "earthquake" theory was more complex and subtle than simply penetrating a hardened surface. The earthquake bombs were designed not to strike a target directly, but to impact beside it, penetrate under it, and create a 'camouflet', or large buried cavern, at the same time as delivering a shock wave through the target's foundations. The target then collapses into the hole, no matter how hardened it may be. The bombs had strong casings because they needed to travel through rock rather than reinforced concrete, though they could perform equally well against hardened surfaces. In an attack on the Valentin U-Boat pens at Farge, two Grand Slams went through the 15 ft (4.5 m) reinforced concrete hardening—equalling or exceeding the best current penetration specifications.

The British Disney bomb (officially "4500 lb [2,000 kg] Concrete piercing/Rocket Assisted Bomb", also known as the "Crab") was a World War II device designed to be used against U-boat pens and other super-hardened targets. Devised by Captain Edward Terrell RNVR of the Admiralty's Directorate of Miscellaneous Weapons Development, it had a streamlined hardened case and weighed about 4,500 lb (2,000 kg) including the rocket assembly. The actual explosive content was about 500 lb (230 kg).

For accuracy, the bombs had to be dropped precisely from a pre-determined height (usually 20,000 ft (6,100 m)). They would free-fall for around 30 seconds until, at 5,000 ft (1,500 m), the rockets were ignited, causing the tail section to be expelled. The rocket burn lasted for three seconds and added 300 ft/s (91 m/s) to the bomb's speed, giving a final impact speed of 1,450 ft/s (440 m/s; 990 mph), approximately Mach 1.29. (Note: Other sources mention a striking speed of 2,400 ft/s (730 m/s; 1,600 mph). (Johnsen 2003, p. 45, Burakowski & Sala 1960, p. 556)) Post-war tests demonstrated that the bombs were able to penetrate a 14-foot-8-inch (4.47 m) thick concrete roof, with the predicted (but untested) ability to penetrate 16 feet 8 inches (5.08 m) of concrete.

==== United States ====
Post war, the US added a form of remote guidance to the Tallboy to create the Tarzon, a 12,000 lb (5,400 kg) bomb deployed in the Korean War against an underground command center near Kanggye.

=== Modern ===
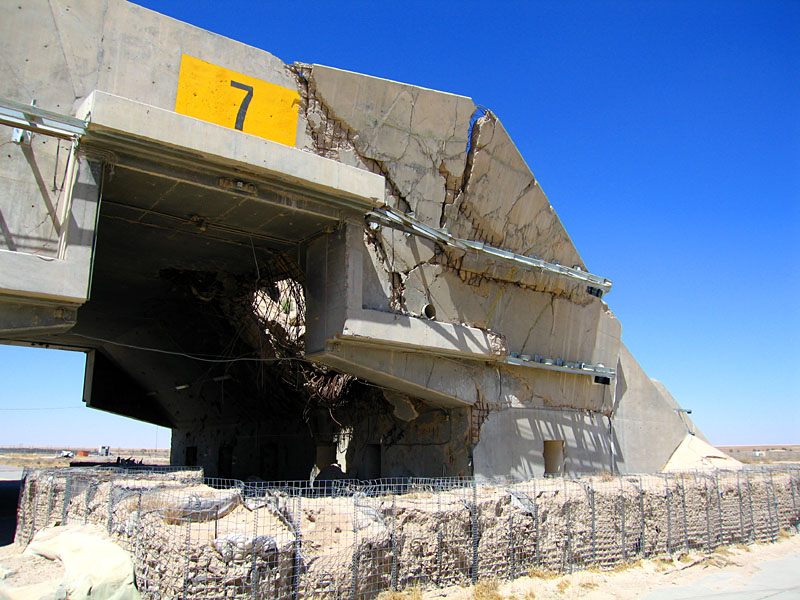
Damage inflicted by bunker busters during the First Persian Gulf War in 1991 at Ali Al Salem Air Base, Kuwait

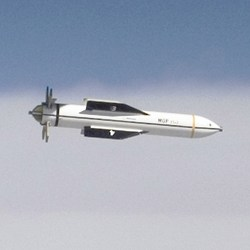
The bunker buster GBU-57A/B MOP during a test at White Sands Missile Range in New Mexico, U.S.

The US BLU-109 bomb is intended to penetrate concrete shelters and other hardened structures before exploding. It entered service in 1985. Israeli F-15I fighter jets are believed to have used BLU-109s in the strikes that killed Hezbollah leader Hassan Nasrallah in Beirut on 27 September 2024.

During Operation Desert Storm (1991), there was a need for a deep penetration bomb similar to the British weapons of World War II, but none of the NATO air forces had such a weapon. As a stop-gap, some were developed over a period of 28 days, using old 8 inch (203 mm) artillery barrels as casings. These bombs weighed over two tons and carried 647 lb (293 kg) of high explosive. They were laser-guided and were designated "Guided Bomb Unit-28 (GBU-28)". It was proven effective for the intended role.

An example of a Russian bunker buster is the KAB-1500L-Pr. It is delivered with the Su-24M and the Su-34 aircraft. It is stated to be able to penetrate 10–20 m of earth or 2 m of reinforced concrete. The bomb weighs 1,500 kg (3,300 lb), with 1,100 kg (2,400 lb) being the high explosive penetrating warhead. It is laser guided and has a reported strike accuracy of 7 m (23 ft) CEP.

The US has a series of custom made bombs that can be mated with Paveway series of laser-guided bombs or the Joint Direct Attack Munition to precisely deliver bunker buster munitions against hardened or deeply buried structures:

Depth of Penetration reinforced concrete	Weapon Systems	
1.8 metres (5 ft 11 in)	BLU-109 Penetrator	GBU-10, GBU-15, GBU-24, GBU-27, AGM-130, GBU-31(V)3/B & GBU-31(V)4/B
3.4 metres (11 ft)	BLU-116 Advanced Unitary Penetrator (AUP)	GBU-15, GBU-24, GBU-27, AGM-130
3.4 metres (11 ft)	BLU-118/B Thermobaric weapon	GBU-15, GBU-24, AGM-130
more than 6 metres (20 ft)	BLU-113 Super Penetrator	GBU-28, GBU-37
18 metres (59 ft)	BLU-127 Massive Ordnance Penetrator	GBU-57

Turkey is another country known to be developing bunker busters, such as the SARB-83 and NEB-84.

The successor to the GBU-57A/B MOP is called the GBU-76/B

== Fuzing ==
The traditional fuze is the same as a classic armor-piercing bomb: a combination of timer and a sturdy dynamic propeller on the rear of the bomb. The fuze is armed when the bomb is released, and detonates when the propeller stops turning and the timer has expired.

Modern bunker busters may use a conventional fuze, but some also include a microphone and microcontroller. The microphone listens, and the microcontroller counts the number of floors until the bomb breaks through the desired numbers of floors. Northrop Grumman is working on the Hard Target Void Sensing Fuze (HTVSF), an electronic and cockpit programmable fuze capable of destroying deeply buried targets. It provides multiple delay arming and detonation times, as well as a void-sensing capability, which allows for precision activation of the fuze for 2,000-and-5,000-pound (910 and 2,270 kg) weapons to explode when they reach an open space in a deeply buried bunker.

== Missiles ==
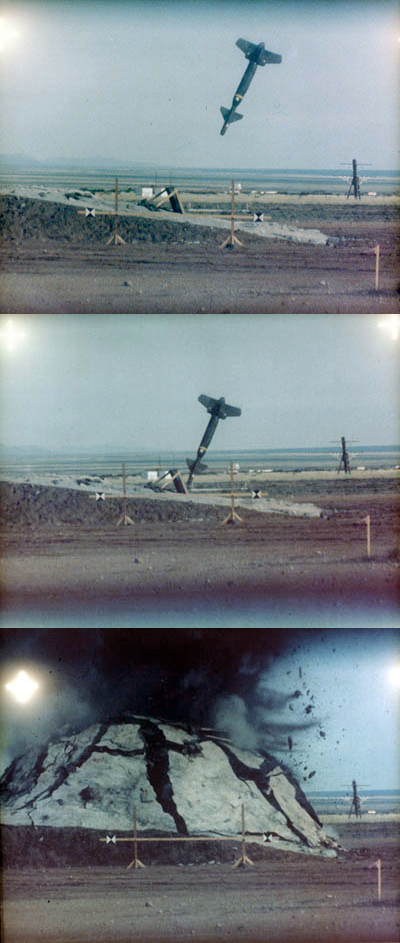
US-made bunker buster GBU-24 Paveway III on a weapons test

The extra speed provided by a rocket motor enables greater penetration of a missile-mounted bunker buster warhead. To reach maximum penetration (impact depth), the warhead may consist of a high-density projectile only. Such a warhead carries more energy than a warhead with chemical explosives (kinetic energy of a projectile at hypervelocity). The only standoff bunker buster munition in U.S. inventory as of 2026 is the Joint Standoff Weapon version C.

== Nuclear ==
The nuclear bunker buster is the nuclear weapon version of the bunker buster. The non-nuclear component of the weapon is designed to greatly enhance the penetration into soil, rock, or concrete to deliver a nuclear warhead to a target. These weapons would be used to destroy deeply buried hardened, underground military bunkers. In theory, the amount of radioactive nuclear fallout would be reduced from that of a standard, air-burst nuclear detonation because they would have relatively low explosive yield. However, because such weapons necessarily come into contact with large amounts of earth-based debris, they may, under certain circumstances, still generate significant fallout. Warhead yield and weapon design have changed periodically throughout the history of the design of such weapons. An underground explosion releases a larger fraction of its energy into the ground, compared to an explosion at or above the surface which releases most of its energy into the atmosphere.

== See also ==
- Disney bomb
- Impact depth
- Rochling shell
- T-12 Cloudmaker
