= Earthquake bomb =

Explosive weapon concept

The earthquake bomb, or seismic bomb, was a concept that was invented by the British aeronautical engineer Barnes Wallis early in World War II and subsequently developed and used during the war against strategic targets in Europe. A seismic bomb differs somewhat in concept from a traditional bomb, which usually explodes at or near the surface and destroys its target directly by explosive force; in contrast, a seismic bomb is dropped from high altitude to attain very high speed as it falls and upon impact, penetrates and explodes deep underground, causing massive caverns or craters known as camouflets, as well as intense shockwaves. In this way, the seismic bomb can affect targets that are too massive to be affected by a conventional bomb, as well as damage or destroy difficult targets such as bridges and viaducts.

Earthquake bombs were used towards the end of World War II on massively reinforced installations, such as submarine pens with concrete walls several meters thick, caverns, tunnels, and bridges.

== Theory and mechanism of damage ==
During development, Barnes Wallis theorised that a highly aerodynamic, very heavy bomb with a delayed detonation would cause damage to a target through shock waves travelling through the ground, hence the nickname 'earthquake bombs'.

The airmen who dropped the bombs reported that the target structures stood undamaged by the detonation; "But then the crater collapsed, the ground shifted, and the target collapsed". Later computer simulations reached the same conclusions: a significant part of the damage was caused by creating a cavity in the ground. That cavity collapse caused the ground to shift, which in turn shifted or broke the target's foundation, resulting in catastrophic structural damage to the target. The shifting ground caused any larger structure to become severely damaged, even if the bomb missed the target but created a crater near it.

They were not true seismic weapons, but effective cratering weapons when used on ground targets. In the anti-ship role, however, great damage could be done to the critical equipment on board a battleship by the shock wave alone.

== Development ==
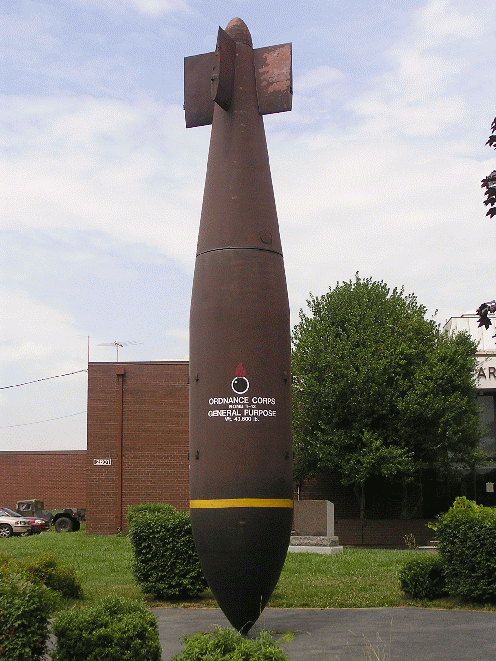
An American T-12 Cloudmaker seismic bomb

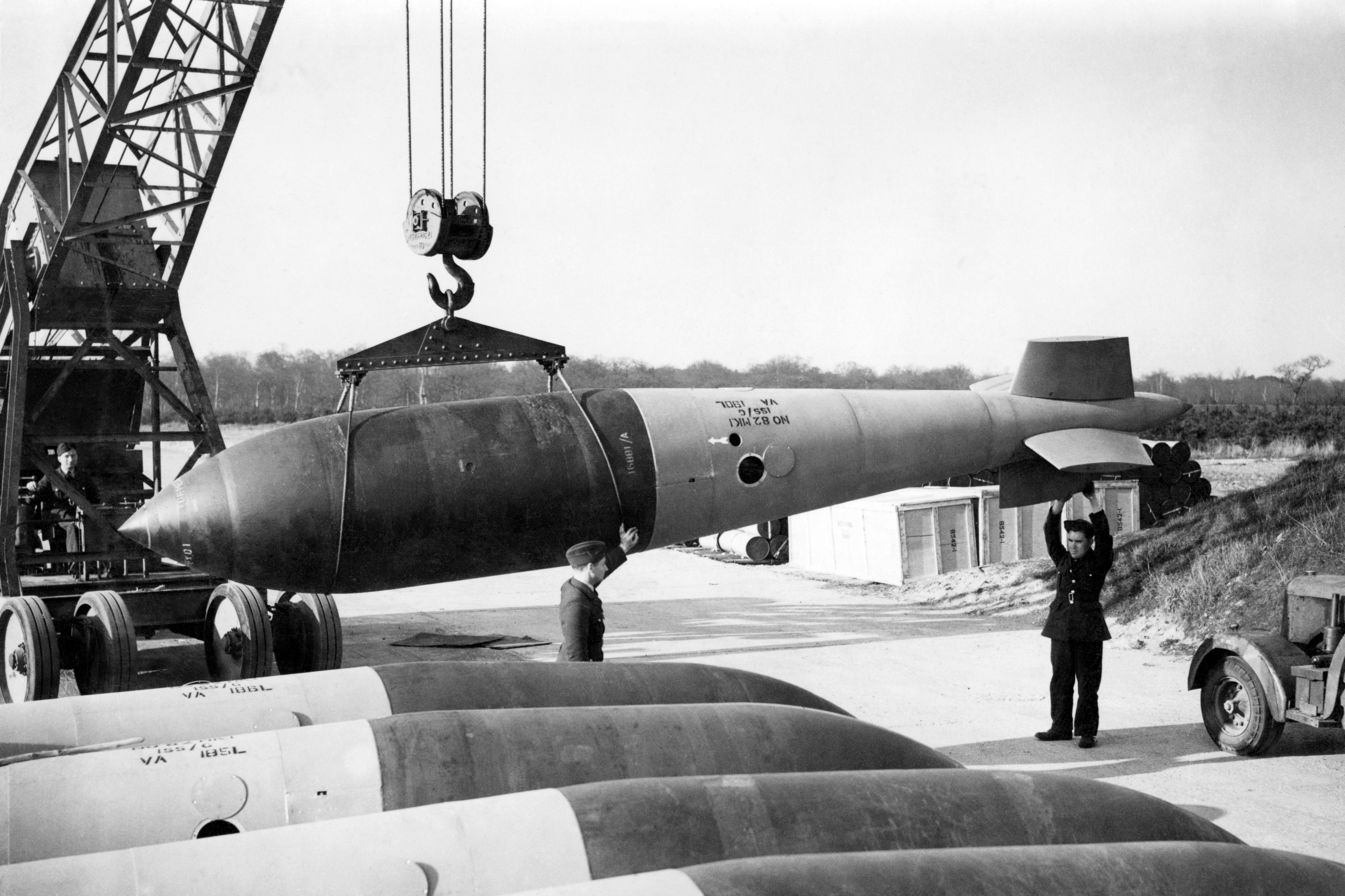
A Grand Slam bomb being handled at RAF Woodhall Spa in Lincolnshire

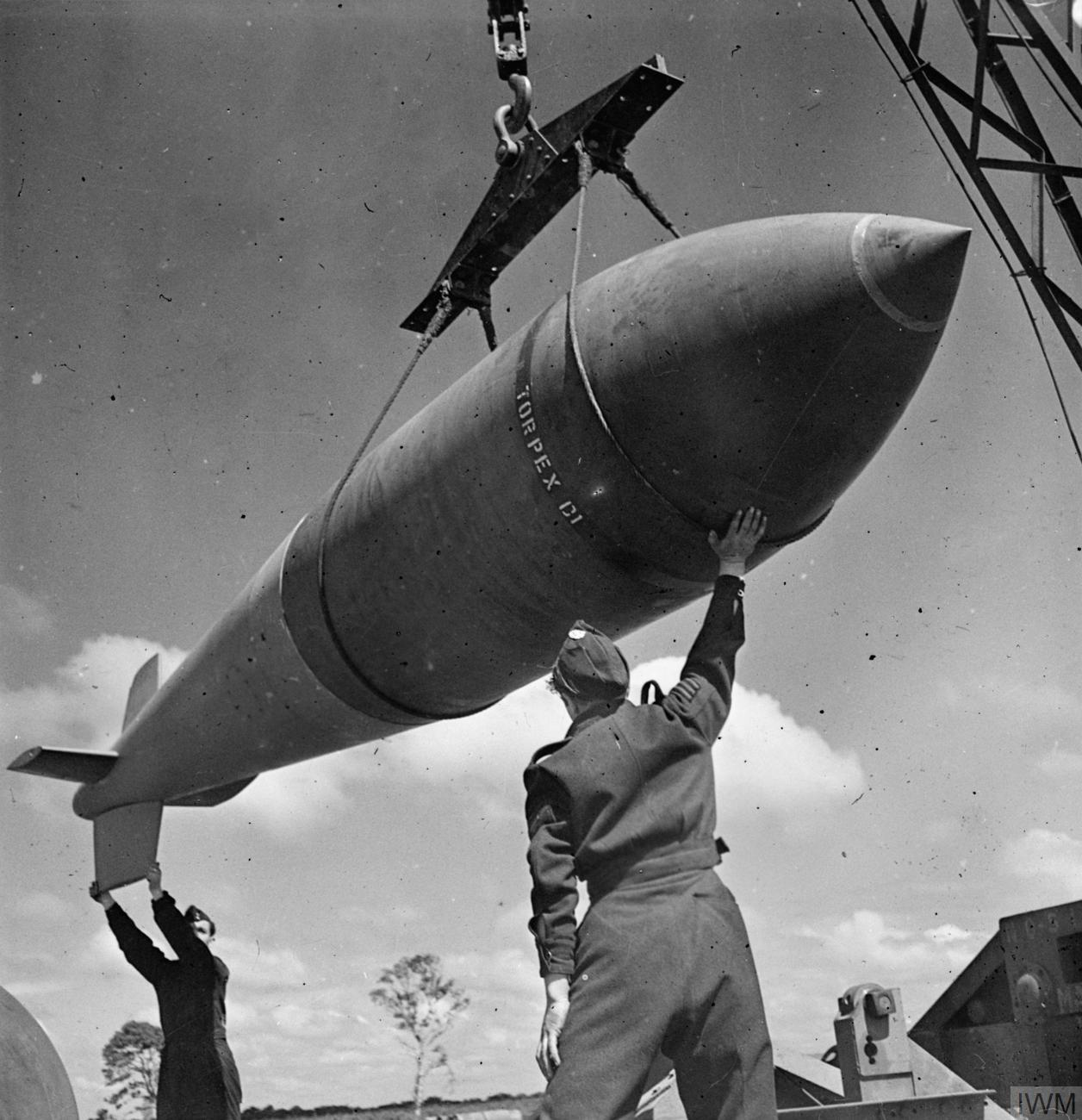
RAF ground crew handling the Tallboy that was later dropped on the La Coupole V-weapon site at Wizernes, France, in 1944

An explosion in air does not transfer much energy into a solid, as their differing acoustic impedances make an impedance mismatch that reflects most of the energy. Due to the lack of bombing accuracy against anti-aircraft defences, air forces used area bombardment, dropping large numbers of bombs to increase the likelihood that the target would be hit. Although a direct hit from a light bomb would destroy an unprotected target, it was comparatively easy to armour ground targets with many yards of concrete and thus render critical installations such as bunkers essentially bombproof. If the bomb could be designed to explode in water, soil, or other less compressible materials, the explosive force would be transmitted more efficiently to the target.

Barnes Wallis' idea was to drop a large, heavy bomb with a hard-armoured tip at supersonic speed (as fast as an artillery shell) so that it would penetrate the ground like a ten-ton bullet fired straight down. It was then set to explode underground, ideally to the side of, or underneath, a hardened target. The resulting shock wave from the explosion would then produce a force equivalent to that of a 3.6 magnitude earthquake, destroying any nearby structures such as dams, railways, viaducts, etc. Any concrete reinforcement of the target would likely help enclose the force better.

Wallis also argued that if the bomb penetrated deep enough, the explosion would not breach the surface of the ground and would thus produce a cavern (a camouflet) that would remove the structure's underground support, causing it to collapse. The process was graphically described as a "trapdoor effect" or "hangman's drop".

Wallis foresaw that disrupting German industry would remove its ability to fight, and also understood that precision bombing was virtually impossible in the late 1930s. The technology for precision aiming was developed during World War II, and Barnes Wallis' ideas were then shown to be successful (see, for example, the Bielefeld raid on 14 March 1945), considering the standards at the time.

Wallis' first concept was for a ten-ton bomb that would explode at a depth of 130 feet (40 m) underground. To achieve this, the bomb would have had to be dropped from 40,000 feet (12 km). The RAF had no aircraft at the time capable of carrying a ten-ton bomb load aloft, let alone lifting it to such a height. Wallis designed a six-engine aeroplane for the task, called the "Victory Bomber", but there was no support for an aircraft with only a single purpose.

Wallis then took a different line, developing a means to destroy Germany's industrial structure by attacking its hydroelectric power supply. After he had developed the bouncing bomb and shown its possibilities, RAF Bomber Command was prepared to listen to his other ideas, even though they often thought them strange. They provided enough support to let him continue his research.

Later in the war, Barnes Wallis made bombs based on the "earthquake bomb concept", such as the 6-ton Tallboy and then the 10-ton Grand Slam, although these were never dropped from more than about 25,000 feet (7.6 km). Even from this relatively low altitude, the earthquake bomb had the ability to disrupt German industry while causing minimal civilian casualties. It was used to disable the V2 launch sites at La Coupole and Blockhaus d'Éperlecques, put out of action the V-3 cannon sites at Fortress of Mimoyecques, sink the battleship Tirpitz and damage the U-boats' protective pens at St. Nazaire, as well as to attack many other targets which had been impossible to damage before. One of the most spectacular attacks was shortly after D-Day, when the Tallboy was used to prevent German tank reinforcements from moving by train. Rather than blow up the tracks – which would have been repaired in a day or so – the bombs were targeted on a tunnel near Saumur which carried the line under a mountain. Twenty-five Lancasters dropped the first Tallboys on the mountain, penetrating straight through the rock, and one of them exploded in the tunnel below. As a result, the entire rail line remained unusable until the end of the war. The Bielefeld viaduct was only closed for brief periods by 54 raids dropping 3,500 tons, but in its first use on 14 March 1945, the "Grand Slam" destroyed whole sections of the viaduct.

After World War II, the United States developed the 43,000-pound (20,000 kg) T12 demolition bomb, which was designed to create an earthquake effect. Given the availability of nuclear weapons with surface detonating laydown delivery, there was little or no development of conventional deep penetrating bombs until the 1991 Gulf War. During the Gulf War, the need for a conventional deep penetrator became clear. In three weeks, a cooperative effort directed by the Armament Systems Division at Eglin Air Force Base in Florida developed the 5,000-pound (2,300 kg) GBU-28 that was used successfully by F-111Fs against a deep underground complex not far from Baghdad just before the end of the war.

The United States has developed a 30,000-pound (14,000 kg) Massive Ordnance Penetrator, designed to attack very deeply buried targets without the use of nuclear weapons, with the inherent huge levels of radioactive pollution and their attendant risk of retaliation in kind.

== Effectiveness ==
Anglo-American bomb tests (Project Ruby) on the comparative effectiveness of large bombs against reinforced concrete structures were carried out in 1946. The tests found that case strength would have to be increased to make any of the tested bombs suitable for use against the targeted reinforced concrete structures.

== See also ==
- Bunker buster
- Compact Kinetic Energy Missile
- Kinetic energy penetrator
