= 2025 Iranian strikes =

2025 Iranian strikes may refer to:

- 2025 Iranian strikes on Israel
- 2025 United States strikes on Iranian nuclear sites
- 2025 Iranian strikes on Al Udeid Air Base, Qatar

== See also ==
- Iran–Israel conflict (disambiguation)
- 2025 Iranian protests (disambiguation) and strikes by truckers, drivers, farmers, etc.
