= 2020 congressional insider trading scandal =

Political scandal in the United States

- Part of COVID-19 pandemic in the United States, 2020 stock market crash
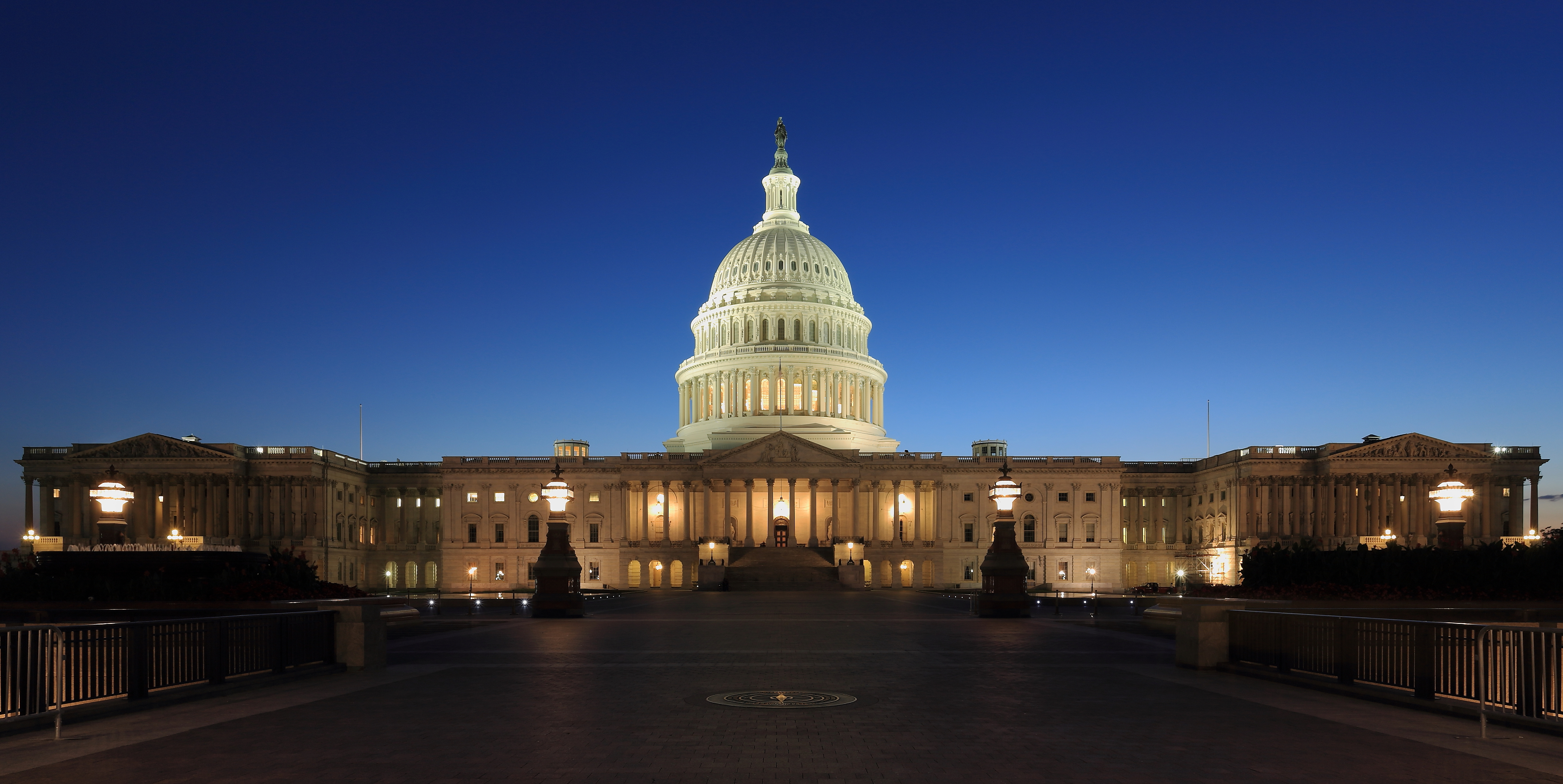
- US Capitol building, home of the US Congress.
- Date: February, 2020 - January 19, 2021
- Location: United States Congress
- Cause: Participants' insider information of COVID-19 pandemic
- Participants: Multiple United States Senators, notably, Richard Burr, Kelly Loeffler, Jim Inhofe, Dianne Feinstein, David Perdue, John Hoeven
- Outcome: Millions of dollars of stock sold and purchased at the start of the COVID-19 pandemic
- Inquiries: No charges brought against participants and all investigations into senators closed

In 2020, a political scandal erupted involving allegations that several members of the United States Senate violated the STOCK Act by selling stock at the start of the COVID-19 pandemic in the United States and just before a stock market crash on February 20, 2020, using knowledge given to them at a closed Senate meeting. The Department of Justice (DOJ) initiated a probe into the stock transactions on March 30, 2020. No charges were brought against anyone and all investigations into the matter are closed.

== Background ==
On January 26, 2012, Senator Joe Lieberman introduced the STOCK Act that would prohibit the use of non-public information for private profit, including insider trading by members of Congress and other government employees. The bill was passed by the Senate with only Senators Richard Burr, Jeff Bingaman, and Tom Coburn voting against it. The House of Representatives voted to approve of the bill and it was signed into law by President Barack Obama on April 4, 2012.

== Timeline ==
On January 24, 2020, the Senate Committees on Health and Foreign Relations held a closed meeting with only Senators present to brief them about the COVID-19 outbreak and how it would affect the United States. Following the meeting Senator Kelly Loeffler and her husband Jeffrey Sprecher, the chairman of the New York Stock Exchange, made twenty-seven transactions to sell stock worth between $1,275,000 and $3,100,000 and two transactions to buy stock in Citrix Systems which saw an increase following the correction. Senator David Perdue made a series of 112 transactions with stocks sold for around $825,000 and bought stocks worth $1.8 million. Perdue started buying around $185,000 in stock in DuPont, a company that makes personal protective equipment, on the same day as the Senate briefing up to March 2. Additionally, John Hoeven of North Dakota purchased $250,000 in health science companies in January, five days after attending a briefing about the pandemic.

On January 31 and February 18, Dianne Feinstein sold stock in Allogene Therapeutics, with the estimated value to be between $1.5 million and $6 million. According to Feinstein, the investment decisions are made by her husband, and are reported by her per Senate rules. She states that “this company is unrelated to any work on the coronavirus and the sale was unrelated to the situation.” Feinstein also reportedly provided documents to the FBI related to her husband's transactions, in order to show that she had no connection to the decision.

On February 7, Senator Burr, the Chair of the Senate Intelligence Committee, stated in an open-editorial on how the government could respond to coronavirus that "Luckily, we have a framework in place that has put us in a better position than any other country to respond to a public health threat, like the coronavirus," However, on February 13, he and his wife sold between $628,000 and $1.7 million worth of stock through thirty-three transactions and on February 27, Burr stated that "There's one thing that I can tell you about this: It is much more aggressive in its transmission than anything that we have seen in recent history," at a Capitol Hill Club luncheon and his statement was later leaked in a secret recording.

On March 19, ProPublica published an article showing that Burr had sold stock shortly before the correction and Kelly Loeffler, Jim Inhofe, and Dianne Feinstein's stock selling was also reported. NPR asked Caitlin Carroll, Burr's spokesperson, for a comment on the alleged violations and she responded with "lol" and then clarified that "As the situation continues to evolve daily, he has been deeply concerned by the steep and sudden toll this pandemic is taking on our economy."

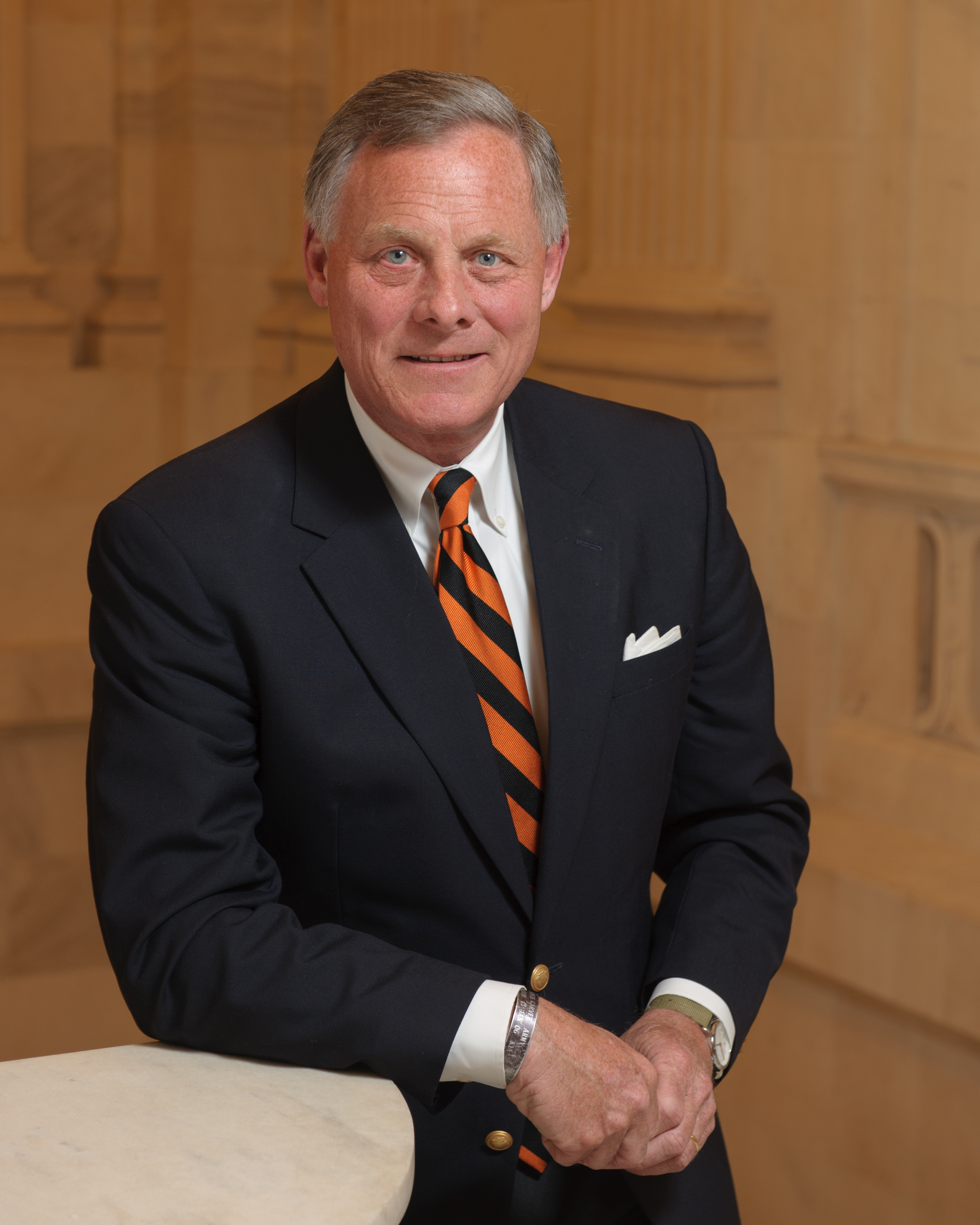
Senator Richard Burr, the most prominent Senator implicated in the scandal. He temporarily stepped down as Chairman of the Intelligence Committee during the investigation.

Tucker Carlson called for Burr to resign from the Senate and be prosecuted for insider trading on a segment of Tucker Carlson Tonight. Representative Alexandria Ocasio-Cortez also called for Burr to resign and Representative Joaquin Castro called for an investigation into the stock selling. Representative Doug Collins, who ran against Loeffler in the special Senate election in Georgia, criticized her by stating "People are losing their jobs, their businesses, their retirements, and even their lives and Kelly Loeffler is profiting off their pain? I'm sickened just thinking about it."

On April 10, Montana Attorney General Tim Fox accused Representative Greg Gianforte, the wealthiest member of the House of Representatives, of insider trading by investing into the manufacturer of hydroxychloroquine. At the time Fox was running against Gianforte for the Republican nomination in the 2020 Montana gubernatorial election. Although several investments were made in Gianforte's name for companies which potentially stood to profit from the COVID-19 pandemic, such as Roche Holdings, Gianforte says all his investments are made for him through a blind trust.

== Investigation ==
On March 20, Burr requested for the Senate Ethics Committee to investigate his stock trading history and stated that he only used publicly available information to make his decisions. On March 30, the Department of Justice initiated a probe into the stock transactions in conjunction with the Securities and Exchange Commission (SEC).

During the investigation it was discovered that Burr had also sold around $47,000 worth of stock in OCI, a Dutch fertilizer company, before it suffered a forty-two percent decrease in its value in 2018. From September 5 to 8, 2018, Burr and his wife sold all of their stock in OCI, which at the time was experiencing its highest share price; a month later it failed to meet quarterly earnings expectations after the Trump administration granted exemptions to eight countries for sanctions placed on Iranian oil and petrochemicals.

On May 13, the FBI seized Burr's phone, to investigate his communications with his stock broker, among other warrants, including one to search his personal iCloud account. On May 14, Burr told Senate Majority Leader Mitch McConnell that he would temporarily step down as chairman of the Senate Intelligence Committee for the remainder of the investigation.

On May 26, the Justice Department announced that it had ended its investigation into Feinstein, Inhofe, and Loeffler. On January 19, 2021, the Justice Department closed its investigation into Burr.
