= Bob McNally =

American government official

- Occupations: Author, consultant, energy policy advisor
- Writing career
- Years active: 1991–present
- Subjects: Energy economics, Oil markets, Geopolitics
- Notable works: Crude Volatility: The History and the Future of Boom-Bust Oil Prices (2017)
- Notable awards: PROSE Award Honorable Mention (2018); Marcel Boiteux Best International Energy Economics Book Award (2023)
- Website: rapidanenergy.com

Robert ("Bob") McNally is an author and consultant who is president of Rapidan Energy Group, a Washington D.C.- consulting firm he established in 2009.

During the first term of President George W. Bush, McNally served on the White House staff as Special Assistant to the President on the National Economic Council and Senior Director for International Energy on the National Security Council.

He is the author of the award-winning book Crude Volatility: The History and the Future of Boom-Bust Oil Prices (Columbia University Press, 2017), which received a strongly favorable review by the Wall Street Journal and the leading energy academic publication The Energy Journal. Crude Volatility won the Honorable Mention in Economics in the 2018 PROSE Award recognizing outstanding scholarship and prose. The International Association for Energy Economics selected Crude Volatility as the winner of the 2023 Marcel Boiteux Best International Energy Economics Book Award. In 2021, The Washingtonian named Bob McNally one of Washington's Top 500 Most Influential People.

He received a BA/BS in International Relations and Political Science from American University and an MA in International Economics and American Foreign Policy from The Johns Hopkins University Paul H. Nitze School of Advanced International Studies (SAIS). McNally served in the Peace Corps from 1988–1990 and was stationed in Senegal. He began his energy career in 1991 as an analyst at Energy Security Analysis, Inc. in Washington, DC. In 1994, he joined Tudor Investment Corporation.

McNally co-authored an essay with Michael Levi in the July/August 2011 issue of Foreign Affairs titled "A Crude Predicament: The Era of Volatile Oil Prices". He has been interviewed by publications such as The Economist, Financial Times, The Washington Post, and regularly appears on news networks such as CNN, CNBC, Bloomberg News, and NPR's Marketplace radio.His articles on oil and OPEC have been published in the Financial Times.

McNally testifies to Congress on energy markets and policy and informally advises officials on energy market trends and developments. In March 2011 was invited by the Senate Committee on Energy and Natural Resources to brief a Senate member-only meeting on oil price developments. He is a Non-Resident Fellow at the Columbia University's Center on Global Energy Policy.

McNally was co-chair of the energy policy advisory group on the 2008 Mitt Romney presidential campaign and energy advisor on Senator Marco Rubio (R-FL)'s 2010 campaign.
