= 2025 Iranian strikes on Al Udeid Air Base =

2025 military attack

Iranian strikes on Al Udeid Air Base
- Part of the Twelve-Day War
- 2025 Iranian strikes on Al Udeid Air Base (Qatar)
- Location: Al Udeid Air Base near Doha, Al Rayyan, Qatar; 25°7′N 51°18′E
- Planned by: Iran
- Objective: Retaliatory strikes against the United States due to Operation Midnight Hammer
- Date: 23 June 2025 approximately 19:39 (AST)
- Executed by: Islamic Revolutionary Guard Corps: Islamic Revolutionary Guard Corps Aerospace Force
- Outcome: Twelve-Day War ceasefire Per Iran: 14 missiles shot, 6 hit successfully; Per Qatar: 13 missiles intercepted, 1 impacted
- Casualties: 0 (per Qatar and United States)

On 23 June 2025, (Note: The attacks are reported to have occurred at approximately 7:39 p.m. AST (i.e. UTC+03:00) on June 23, which corresponds to 16:39 UTC on June 23) Iran launched missiles at Al Udeid Air Base in Qatar, in retaliation for the United States strikes on Iranian nuclear facilities on 22 June as part of the Twelve-Day War. The attack, codenamed Operation Glad Tidings of Victory, (Note: Persian: عملیات بشارت فتح, romanized: Amaliyāt-i Bashārat-i Fath.) followed a 16 June drone attack by Iran on the US consulate in Erbil, Iraq. It was Iran's second attack on a US base, after Operation Martyr Soleimani in 2020. Iran warned Qatar and the US hours before the attack, as it had before its response to the assassination of Qasem Soleimani. Shortly after, the Taji military base and Imam Ali base in Iraq were both attacked by drones.

Qatar had closed its airspace before the missiles arrived, and claimed to have intercepted all of them. After the attack, the United Arab Emirates, Bahrain, Kuwait, and Iraq also closed their airspaces. The attack was met with condemnation throughout some countries. Satellite imagery revealed noticeable damage to the white radar dome in the base.

== Background ==
In March 2025, US director of national intelligence Tulsi Gabbard testified that the US Intelligence Community "continues to assess Iran is not building a nuclear weapon and Supreme Leader Khamenei has not authorized a nuclear weapons program". US intelligence said Iran could develop a bomb in seven months to a year. Iranian officials have consistently said their nuclear efforts are for peaceful purposes, not weapons. In April 2025, Trump launched negotiations with Iran over its nuclear program, declaring that Tehran had two months to secure a deal. On 10 June 2025, United States Central Command (CENTCOM) commander Michael Kurilla said that Iran could produce weapons-grade uranium in a week. On 12 June, the last day of Trump's two-month deadline, the IAEA found Iran non-compliant with its nuclear obligations for the first time in 20 years. On 13 June 2025, Israel attacked Iran's nuclear facilities and assassinated various military leaders, saying that Iran's nuclear program was a threat.

On 22 June 2025, the United States Air Force and Navy attacked three nuclear sites in Iran: the Fordow Uranium Enrichment Plant, the Natanz Nuclear Facility, and the Isfahan Nuclear Technology Center. These were struck by 14 GBU-57A/B MOP 30,000-pound (14,000 kg) "bunker buster" bombs dropped by Northrop B-2 Spirit stealth bombers; a US submarine also fired Tomahawk missiles. Dubbed Operation Midnight Hammer, it was the United States's first offensive military action in the Twelve-Day War.

== Prelude ==
On 23 June 2025, reports emerged that Iran had positioned missile launchers for a potential retaliatory strike. Iran gave advance warning to Qatar and the US hours before the attack.

The United Arab Emirates (UAE) closed its airspace to inbound flights from the west, while Iran closed its airspace to all but flights with special permission to operate.

US warplanes began evacuating Qatar's Al-Udeid Air Base, which serves as the regional headquarters for United States Central Command (CENTCOM). Satellite images of the base taken moments before the attack by Planet Labs showed that it was mostly empty of aircraft.

== Attacks ==
About 7:39 pm local time, Iran launched missiles at Al-Udeid. US officials said the barrage included short-range and medium-range ballistic missiles. Explosions were heard in Doha, the capital of Qatar. Social media posts showed missiles streaking across the sky.

A US Defense Department official said that its air defenses in Qatar intercepted 13 Iranian missiles, while another was allowed to crash harmlessly off-target. The Qatar Defense Ministry said that it had intercepted the missiles and that the attack resulted in no casualties. Iranian media outlets described the strike as "devastating."

After the attack, Iran's Revolutionary Guards issued a statement saying that the attack was retaliation for US "military aggression" against Iran's "peaceful" nuclear program: one missile for each US bomb dropped on Iran's nuclear facilities.

The White House confirmed the missile strikes. President Donald Trump convened his national security team to discuss the developments. US officials placed military assets on high alert and expressed readiness to respond.

The US activated air defense systems in Al-Asad Airbase in Iraq. Iran's Mehr News Agency said that Iran had also fired missiles at US forces in Iraq, but the claim was rebutted by other sources.

=== Other strikes ===
Iraqi state media reported drone attacks at Iraq's Taji military base quoting a military official but claimed that there had been no casualties. Iran's Tasnim news agency reported drone hits at the US Victory Base Complex, near Baghdad International Airport. The Balad military base in Iraq also reportedly came under attack. Iran's Tasnim news agency claimed two explosions were heard inside the base. Al Sumaria TV network also reported an attack on the radar systems at Imam Ali base in Iraq. According to a spokesman for the Iraqi Prime Minister, the drones caused "significant damage" to the radar systems of the Taji and Imam Ali bases. The Iraqi government condemned the attacks as a "cowardly and treacherous" assault.

== Damage ==
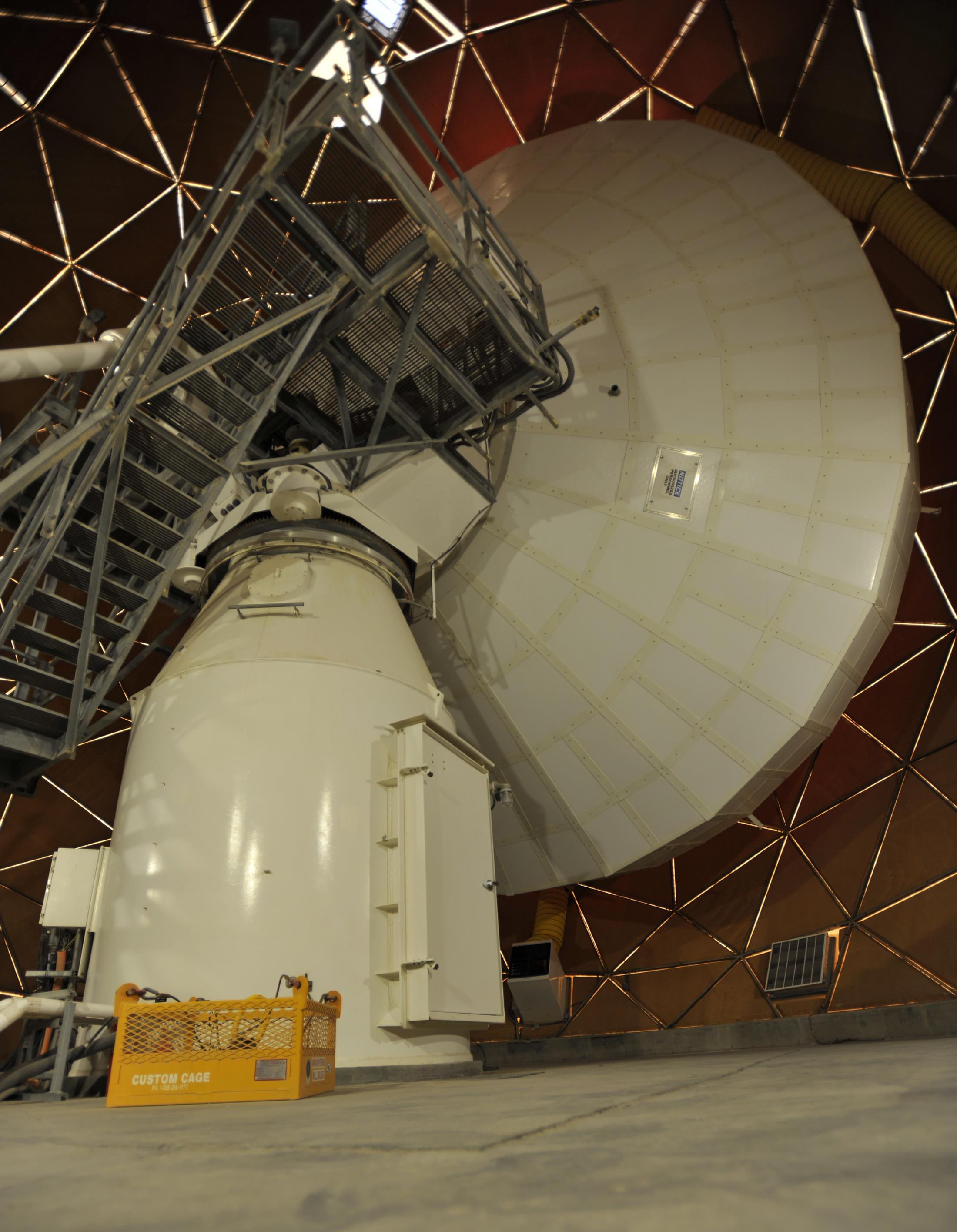
The Modernized Enterprise Terminal at Al Udeid air base, reportedly damaged by one of the missiles

After the Iranian missile strike on the Al-Udeid air base, satellite images from Planet Labs revealed noticeable damage to the white radar dome. A spokesperson from the Pentagon also verified that the missile struck the dome. The geodesic dome contains equipment utilized by the Americans for secure communications, housing an Modernization Enterprise Terminal (MET) using a large a satellite dish. The Air Force says the system "provides secure communication capabilities including voice, video and data services, linking service members in the U.S. Central Command area of responsibility with military leaders around the world." MET became operational in 2016 and cost $15 million ($20.1 million in 2025).

Certain analysts contend that "two U.S. Army Patriot systems, tasked with the defense of the Al-Udeid base, were redirected while attempting to intercept Iranian missiles. There are those who assert that Iranian drones were responsible for this diversion.

In June 2026, Air & Space Forces Magazine reported that multiple Iranian missiles struck the Combined Air Operations Center (CAOC) at Al Udeid Air Base during the early weeks of the war, rendering the facility inoperable. The magazine described the CAOC as the command center that had directed U.S. air campaigns in the Middle East for more than two decades, including operations in Afghanistan and Iraq, the campaign against the Islamic State, and operations against the Houthis in Yemen.

== Reactions ==
=== Iran ===
Following the strikes, Iran's Islamic Revolutionary Guard Corps issued a statement asserting that any additional US aggression would lead to the "collapse" of America's military presence in the region, calling US bases in the region "major weak points and the Achilles' heel of this warmongering regime". Iranian supreme leader Ayatollah Ali Khamenei said "We didn't harm anyone. And we will not accept any harassment from anyone under any circumstances". Iranian deputy foreign affairs minister for policy Majid Takht-Ravanchi stated that Iran would continue abiding by the Non-Proliferation Treaty, earlier Iranian threats to withdraw notwithstanding.

Iran said the attack was an "act of self-defence [that] had nothing to do with our friendly neighbour Qatar, as we enjoy excellent and deeply rooted relationships". The IRGC claimed in a statement that six missiles hit Al Udeid Air Base, and described the operation as destructive and powerful.

=== Qatar ===
Qatar strongly condemned the Iranian attack on Al Udeid Air Base in its territory, adding that Qatar's air defenses successfully intercepted the missiles and that there were no human casualties. Qatar said that Iran's actions may cause "catastrophic consequences for international peace and security". Foreign Ministry spokesperson Majed al-Ansari said that Qatar reserved the right to "respond directly, proportionate to the nature and scale of this blatant aggression". The Iranian ambassador to Qatar was summoned by the Foreign Ministry on 24 June 2025, expressing the country's strong condemnation of Iran's violation of its sovereignty and airspace. The Qatari representative to the UN in New York sent a letter to the UN Security Council stressing that it "reserves the right to respond directly in a manner equivalent with the nature and scale of this blatant aggression and in accordance with the Charter and international law."

=== United States ===
US president Donald Trump dismissed the Iranian attack as "a very weak response" and thanked Iran for giving the US early notice about the strikes. He also called on Iran to take the opportunity to "proceed to peace and harmony in the region", and said that he "will enthusiastically encourage Israel to do the same". Five hours after the strikes, Trump stated that Iran and Israel had agreed on a ceasefire proposal and that the former would end hostilities at midnight 24 June, to be followed by Israel 12 hours later. According to Reuters, a "senior Iranian official" responded affirmatively, noting that the offer was made by the US and mediated by Qatar.

=== International ===
- Algeria: Algeria condemned the "flagrant and unacceptable violations" and reaffirmed its "solidarity and support for the sisterly state of Qatar".
- Australia: Australia denounced the assaults. Senator Penny Wong stressed that Australia will continue to advocate for de-escalation, discussion, and diplomacy.
- Bahrain: Bahrain affirmed its "full support for the sisterly State of Qatar following the Iranian attack on its territory".
- Canada: Prime Minister Mark Carney called the attack "a diplomatic move by Iran" which was "proportionate" and "de-escalatory" and opened a window for diplomacy.
- Comoros: The Comoros condemned the attacks, expressing "deep concern" about the growing tensions in the Middle East and urging "a diplomatic resolution to the conflict."
- Djibouti: The Foreign Ministry strongly denounced the attacks, calling it a "flagrant violation of the sovereignty" of Qatar.
- Egypt: Egypt strongly condemned the attacks on Qatar as a "violation of its sovereignty".
- France: President Emmanuel Macron stated that "France's solidarity is with Qatar" and called on all parties "to exercise maximum restraint, de-escalate, and return to the negotiating table," adding that "the spiral of chaos must end".
- Iraq: Iraq described the attack as a "dangerous and accelerating escalation" that could expand the conflict.
- Italy: Prime Minister Giorgia Meloni expressed her compassion for Qatar and Italy's support. She added that this was the moment to start renegotiation and head towards a ceasefire in the region in order to avoid further escalation.
- Jordan: Jordan strongly condemned the attack, calling it a "flagrant violation" of Qatar's sovereignty.
- Kuwait: Kuwait expressed its "strong condemnation and denunciation of the attacks targeting Al Udeid Air Base in the sisterly State of Qatar" and declared "full support" for Qatar.
- Lebanon: President Joseph Aoun and Prime Minister Nawaf Salam condemned the attacks and expressed solidarity with Qatar.
- Libya: The Ministry declared its complete support for Qatar, calling the attack a direct danger to regional security and stability and a flagrant infringement on the sovereignty of an independent state.
- Mauritania: Mauritania expressed its "firm condemnation and denunciation of this aggression", claiming it undermines the sovereignty and territorial integrity of Qatar and expressing "full solidarity" with the State of Qatar, its leaders and its people. Mauritania also reiterated its call for restraint, dialogue, and wisdom to preserve security and stability in the region.
- Morocco: Morocco condemned what it called a "blatant missile strike" and reaffirmed its full solidarity with Qatar.
- Oman: Oman denounced the attack and called it a "violation of the country's sovereignty" but blamed Israel for attacking Iran first on the 13th of June. In response to the attack, Oman also identified Israel as the main culprit behind the increase in tensions in the Middle East.
- Palestine: The Palestinian Authority condemned the Iranian strikes as a blatant violation of Qatari sovereignty.
- Saudi Arabia: Saudi Arabia condemned the Iranian attack in Qatar "in the strongest terms", calling it "a flagrant violation of international law".
- Somalia: Somalia criticized the attacks, stating that they violated international law and Qatar's airspace.
- Sudan: The Foreign Ministry condemned the attacks, calling them "an escalation that threatens peace, security, and stability" and emphasizing the importance of suspending military actions in the region.
- Syria: President Ahmed al-Sharaa denounced the strikes, calling them a flagrant breach of international law and a violation of Qatari sovereignty and airspace.
- Tunisia: Tunisia voiced support for Qatar, reaffirming its rejection of attacks on its territorial integrity and national sovereignty, which endanger the security and safety of Qatari citizens.
- Turkey: In a phone conversation with Emir Sheikh Tamim bin Hamad Al Thani, President Recep Tayyip Erdoğan said his nation strongly condemned the assaults, calling them a blatant breach of Qatar's airspace and sovereignty, as well as of international law and the UN Charter.
- Ukraine: The Foreign Ministry condemned the strikes, urging Iran to come to its senses and resume collaboration with the international community to meet its commitments in the context of verifiable nuclear nonproliferation.
- United Arab Emirates: The UAE condemned "in the strongest terms" the targeting of the base and expressed solidarity with Qatar.
- United Kingdom: Following the attacks, a minister stated that any escalation in the Middle East is "utterly condemned" by the UK. Foreign Secretary David Lammy called on Iran to "take the off ramp" and return to the bargaining table with the US.
- Yemen: Yemen denounced the attacks. The Foreign Ministry said: "this serious escalation clearly reflects the aggressive and chaotic nature of the Iranian regime, and its insistence on dragging the region into the quagmire of chaos and instability by fabricating crises and its constant efforts to mix issues and ignite regional tensions."

=== Non-state actors ===
- Arab League: The Arab Parliament condemned the attack as "a flagrant and unacceptable violation of Qatari sovereignty" and warned against further escalation.
- Gulf Cooperation Council: GCC secretary-general Jasem Mohamed Al Budaiwi strongly condemned the Iranian attack as a threat to all GCC states and expressed "surprise".
- United Nations: UN secretary-general António Guterres condemned the escalation and expressed that he's "deeply alarmed".

== Analysis ==
A report by the Institute for the Study of War implied that Iran had choreographed the strikes to minimize tensions, in part by notifying Al Udeid in advance. Relatively "moderate" Iranian officials were said to be urging a cessation of conflict on Supreme Leader Khamenei.

Danny Citrinovich, a senior fellow at the Institute for National Security Studies, believes: "Iran's missile attack on Al-Udeid base is an unprecedented event that shows that Iran is far from surrendering and accepting the dictates and impositions of the United States."

== See also ==
- Attacks on the United States
- Israeli airstrike on Hamas leadership in Qatar – Another attack on Qatar months later
