= 2025 United States strikes on Iranian nuclear sites =

2025 American military action

- Part of the Twelve-Day War
- 2025 United States strikes on Iranian nuclear sites (Iran)
- Location: Fordow, Natanz, and Isfahan, Iran
- Planned by: United States
- Commanded by: Donald Trump; Anthony J. Cotton; Michael Kurilla
- Objective: Destruction of Iran's nuclear facilities
- Date: June 22, 2025; 02:10–02:35 (IRST)
- Executed by: United States Air Force; United States Navy
- Outcome: Iranian strikes on Al Udeid Air Base in Qatar Per U.S. officials: All three sites sustained "extremely severe damage and destruction"; Natanz nuclear site has been destroyed while Fordow and Isfahan suffered "major damage"; Iranian nuclear program set back around two years; Per leaked DIA report: Sites damaged but not destroyed.; Iranian nuclear program delayed by a few months.; Per Israeli intelligence: Sites damaged but Iran's nuclear program has not been destroyed.; Per Iran: Sites endured "significant and serious damages"; Sites sustained "quite superficial" damage with no irreversible harm (initial claim); Per the IAEA: (Note: International Atomic Energy Agency): Sites "suffered enormous damage"
- Casualties: None

On June 22, 2025, (Note: The attacks are reported to have occurred at about 2:30 a.m. Iran Standard Time (i.e. UTC+03:30) on June 22, which corresponds to 23:00 UTC on June 21.) the United States Air Force and Navy attacked three nuclear facilities in Iran as part of the Twelve-Day War, under the code name Operation Midnight Hammer. The Fordow Uranium Enrichment Plant, the Natanz Nuclear Facility, and the Isfahan Nuclear Technology Center were targeted with fourteen GBU-57A/B MOP "bunker buster" bombs carried by B-2 Spirit stealth bombers, and Tomahawk missiles fired from a submarine. According to U.S. president Donald Trump, US F-35 and F-22 fighters also entered Iran's airspace to draw its surface-to-air missiles, but no launches were detected.

The attack was the United States' only offensive action in the Twelve-Day War, which began on June 13 with surprise Israeli strikes, and ended with the ceasefire on June 24, 2025. It was the first U.S. attack on an Iranian target since the 2020 assassination of Qasem Soleimani, and on Iran's territory since a 1988 naval offensive. President Trump claimed the strikes "completely and totally obliterated" Iran's key nuclear enrichment facilities, though later reporting indicated only one facility (Fordow) had been "mostly destroyed." A final bomb damage assessment of the strikes was still ongoing as of August 2025. A July 2025 Pentagon assessment found that Iran's nuclear program was likely set back around two years. Iranian foreign minister Abbas Araghchi said that nuclear sites sustained severe damage.

Congressional Republicans largely supported Trump's action, while most Democrats and some Republicans were concerned about the constitutionality of the move, its effects, and Iran's response. World reaction was mixed, as some world leaders welcomed the move to incapacitate Iran's nuclear program while others expressed concern over escalation or otherwise condemned the strikes. Iran responded by attacking a U.S. base in Qatar. The next day Trump announced a ceasefire between Iran and Israel. On July 2, Iran suspended cooperation with the International Atomic Energy Agency (IAEA). In February 2026, Trump contradicted his prior claims that the Iranian nuclear program had been "obliterated" by again claiming that Iran was rebuilding its nuclear program. Later the same month, the US under Trump launched the 2026 Iran war with the Iranian nuclear program as a justification. Analysts and lawmakers later questioned the extent to which Operation Midnight Hammer had achieved its goals.

== Background ==
=== Iran nuclear program and American relations with Iran ===
Four years after the U.S. and other Western nations helped engineer the 1953 Iranian coup d'état against Iranian prime minister Mohammad Mosaddegh, Shah Mohammad Reza Pahlavi and the Eisenhower administration agreed to help develop the Iranian nuclear program, part of the U.S. effort to promote the peaceful pursuit of nuclear science through the "Atoms for Peace" program. In 1968, Iran signed the Non-Proliferation Treaty (NPT). With profits made from the 1973 oil crisis, Pahlavi decided to increase Iran's civil nuclear program and dispatched Iranian students to the Massachusetts Institute of Technology to learn nuclear engineering. With U.S. endorsement, Pahlavi began a plan to build 23 nuclear power plants, which would enable Iran to supply electricity to neighboring countries, become a leader in the region, and become a modern state. When then-secretary of state Henry Kissinger attempted to limit Iran's ability to weaponize the nuclear reprocessing of spent nuclear fuel into fissile material through safeguards, Pahlavi handed nuclear-construction contracts to Germany and France.

In 1979, the Iranian Revolution overthrew Pahlavi. After the Iran–Iraq War concluded in 1988, Iran's Islamic leaders launched a nuclear program to produce electricity for its burgeoning population, and to serve as a deterrent. In 2015, Iran, the United States (under Barack Obama), and other countries negotiated the Joint Comprehensive Plan of Action (JCPOA) to manage Iran's nuclear program to function at a limited level for 15 years, in return for removal of economic international sanctions against Iran. In 2018, Trump—who has maintained since at least 2011 that Iran should not be permitted to acquire nuclear weapons—unilaterally broke the agreement by withdrawing the United States from the JCPOA, costing Iran the negotiated sanction relief, while implementing even more sanctions that effectively cut off (JCPOA-facilitated) European trade with Iran. Trump's government said that the JCPOA was not preventing Iran from developing a nuclear weapon. At the time, the International Atomic Energy Agency (IAEA) reported that Iran was still in compliance with the agreement.

On February 4, 2025, Israeli prime minister Benjamin Netanyahu visited Washington, D.C. and reportedly reminded Trump that Iran had planned to assassinate him. Netanyahu gave a detailed slide deck presentation showing how Iran was increasing its uranium stockpile and advancing its centrifuge technology, which Netanyahu said showed Iran was close to crossing the nuclear threshold. Trump wanted to attempt diplomacy and his team decided on a 60-day outline to settle on an agreement. On May 31, 2025, the IAEA reported that Iran had sharply increased its stockpile of uranium enriched to 60% purity, just below weapons-grade, reaching over 408 kilograms (899 lb), a nearly 50% rise since February. The agency warned that this amount is enough for multiple nuclear weapons if further enriched. Iran said that it increased its uranium enrichment to levels beyond what is required for civilian use as a response to the 2018 American withdrawal from JCPOA. The IAEA reported that Iran was not meeting its obligations per its 2019 agreement by hiding its development of nuclear material, and the IAEA voted to censure Iran on June 12. Iran responded to the IAEA censure by declaring it would create a new uranium-enrichment facility at an unknown location. It has consistently claimed that it is developing nuclear energy and not nuclear weapons. Before Israel attacked Iran in June, the Israelis had given the U.S. information that it thought concerning. The U.S. intelligence agencies were not convinced the information actually showed Iran was getting closer to crossing the nuclear threshold.

One of the major Iranian nuclear sites is the Fordow Uranium Enrichment Plant, estimated to be 80 to 90 meters underground. Because of its deep location, the United States military officials had proposed the use of GBU-57A/B MOP "bunker buster" bombs, which can only be carried by a B-2 bomber, to destroy Fordow (the United States is the only nation to possess either of these capabilities). There was extended debate about whether the bunker buster bombs would actually be able to destroy Fordow. Multiple advisors to Trump, including Steve Bannon and Director of National Intelligence Tulsi Gabbard, warned against war with Iran and have claimed the intelligence community does not consider Iran to be building a nuclear weapon. After Trump called Gabbard "wrong" and said he "did not care what she said," Gabbard changed her position and said Iran could have a nuclear weapon "within months". Trump also said in response to these comments that, "my intelligence community is wrong."

=== Israeli involvement and American relations with Israel ===
Israel states that it supports nuclear nonproliferation but believes the NPT has little relevance to the Middle East and has not joined the NPT. Israel, widely believed to possess nuclear weapons, has consistently viewed the potential for regional powers to acquire nuclear weapons as an existential threat and has previously attacked nuclear facilities in Iraq and Syria to prevent those countries from acquiring nuclear weapons. It has repeatedly undertaken both covert and overt actions to prevent such developments and has assassinated Iranian nuclear scientists. The conflict between Iran and Israel has been intensifying since the October 7, 2023, attacks by Hamas, as Hamas is partially funded by Iran. Historically, the U.S. has supported Israel in the Middle East, and particularly has financed Israel's military through United States Foreign Military Financing as well as supporting Israel's military actions.

For more than 30 years preceding the American strikes, the United States has been the foremost defender of Israel on the international stage, as well as the main provider of military aid to Israel with few pauses. Once Israel started the Twelve-Day War, it immediately encouraged the United States to enter the war, reported Reuters. Vox said that Israel's goal in the war may be regime change in Iran, rather than a simple targeting of their nuclear program, and that Trump has placed military support behind these goals.

While the American strikes (and other Israeli strikes during the Twelve-Day War) have attacked Iran's nuclear program, and while Israel has continually accused Iran of pursuing nuclear weapons, Israel itself is widely believed to possess nuclear weapons, possibly since the early 1960s. Israel has maintained an ambiguous position since the late 1960s, stating that it "won't be the first to introduce nuclear weapons into the Middle East" without confirming whether it currently possesses them. Netanyahu reiterated this stance in 2011.

=== Congressional resolutions ===
In the week before the bombings, Senator Tim Kaine (D-VA) introduced a resolution in the Senate stating that Trump could not use the U.S. military against Iran without explicit authorization from Congress, through either a declaration of war or an authorization for use of military force. Representatives Thomas Massie (R-KY) and Ro Khanna (D-CA) introduced a parallel resolution, the War Powers Resolution, in the House of Representatives. The resolution was defeated in the Senate.

=== Opinion polling ===
Many right-wing politicians and commentators in the United States, including Rand Paul and Tucker Carlson, have criticized Trump's support for Israeli strikes against Iran, and the possible involvement of the United States in the war. A poll (prior to June 18, 2025) of Trump voters found 53% said the U.S. should not get involved in the Iran–Israel conflict. A separate poll (prior to June 18, 2025) by The Washington Post found 45% of respondents opposed the U.S. military launching airstrikes against Iran, and a further 30% were unsure; 25% supported a military response.

== Prelude ==
In the weeks leading up to June 22, the U.S. evacuated its citizens, issued travel warnings, and withdrew non-essential personnel from embassies in the region. On June 16, Iranian facilities interfered with ship position reporting, causing a nuisance to shipping in the Strait of Hormuz. On June 16 and 17, Trump made several posts hinting at something "much bigger" than a peace deal coming. On June 17, Trump called on Iran to unconditionally surrender. U.S. secretary of state Marco Rubio told U.S. allies over recent days that Washington would prefer to see a diplomatic solution, and Trump had sent U.S. officials to Tehran in support of a nuclear deal.

In the days before the attack, Iran increased its oil exports, fearing a U.S. attack on its oil facilities. Iran claimed that nuclear material had already been evacuated from Fordow and Natanz, and moved elsewhere. The Iranians attempted to cover the ventilation shafts at Fordow with concrete caps days ahead of the strike.

Meanwhile, the Yemeni Houthis also declared their readiness to fight and in response, the U.S. warned of a devastating retaliation should American interests be threatened.

Axios reported that the top Democrats on the Senate and House Intelligence panels were not given advance notice of the attack while the top Republicans were, though that Senate Minority Leader Chuck Schumer was given a "perfunctory notice shortly before".

Russian Deputy Foreign Minister Sergei Ryabkov said on June 18 that Moscow had cautioned Washington against offering direct military assistance to Israel, saying it "would be a step drastically destabilizing the situation as a whole."

=== U.S. military preparation ===
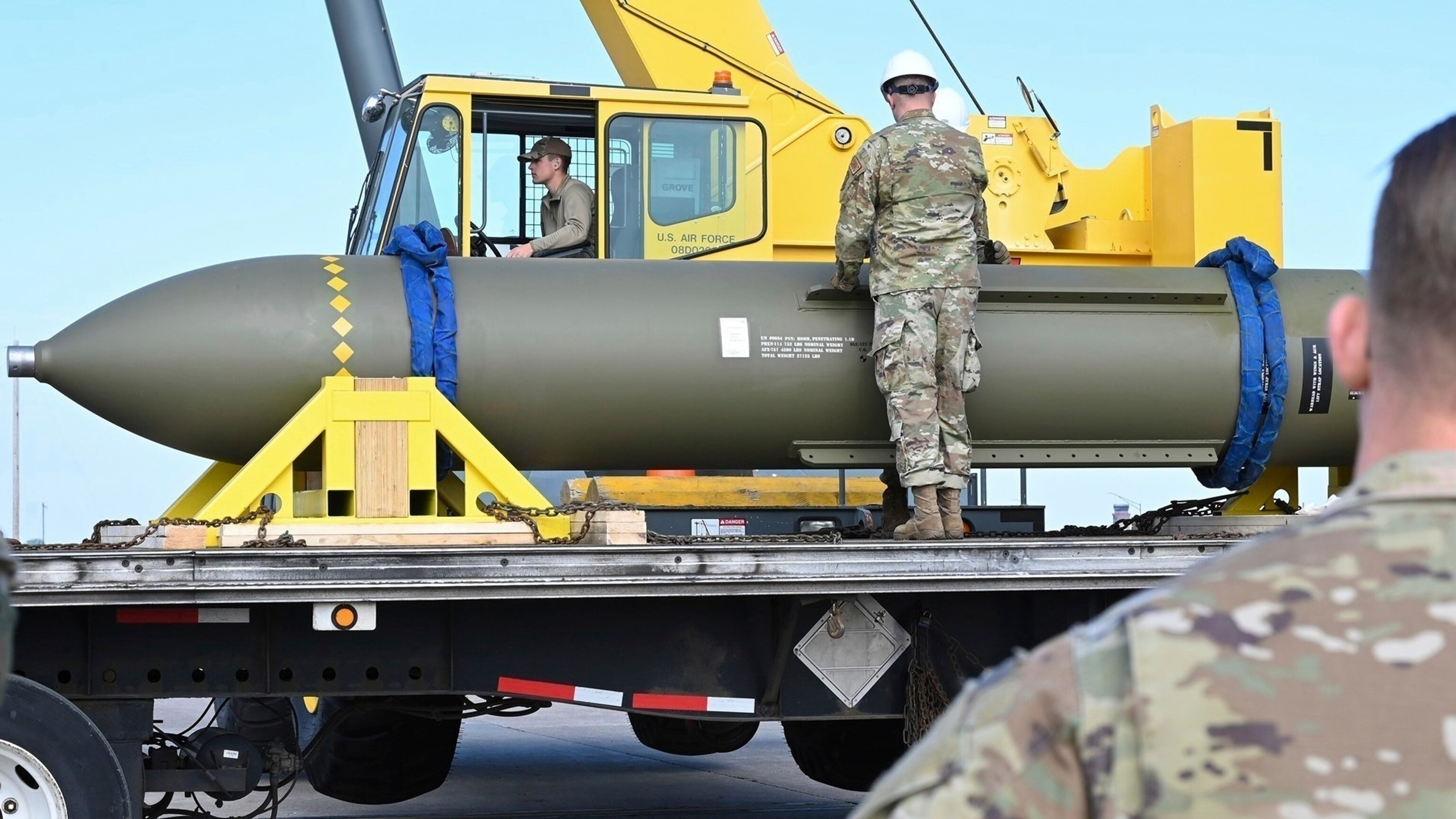
Operation Midnight Hammer was the first combat use of the 30,000-pound (14,000 kg) GBU-57 MOP (pictured).

The Defense Threat Reduction Agency had studied the Fordow Uranium Enrichment Plant for 15 years.

The Fordow nuclear facility is fortified and located about 80–90 metres (260–300 ft) underground, inside of a mountain, a depth that would likely require heavy "bunker buster" ordnance, such as the GBU-57A/B MOP (Massive Ordnance Penetrator), for conventional bombing to damage it. The GBU-57 had never been used in combat before and, due to its heavy weight, the munition can only be delivered by B-2 stealth bombers, which only the United States possesses. ABC News reported that the U.S. and Israeli militaries had conducted a practice run of this attack during a training exercise in mid-2024 during the Biden administration. In March 2025, the Israeli and U.S. air forces ran a joint exercise which The Times of Israel reported was "seen as a warning message to Tehran" amidst speculation of a possible strike.

According to Chairman of the Joint Chiefs of Staff Air Force General Dan Caine, two unidentified officers from the Defense Threat Reduction Agency (DTRA) had studied the Fordow nuclear site for around 15 years and their work contributed to the development of a bunker-buster bomb that was made specifically to penetrate fortifications such as Fordow; computer modeling, simulation and hundreds of tests were conducted during development of the weapon. According to General Caine, the two DTRA officers "literally dreamed about this target as they slept" and heavily monitored "the vent shaft, the exhaust shaft, the electrical systems, the environmental control systems, every nook, every crater, every piece of equipment going in and every piece of equipment going out" of Fordow since 2009. "You do not build a multilayered, underground bunker complex with centrifuges and other equipment in a mountain for any peaceful purpose," Caine observed.

On June 16, 2025, three days after Israel launched airstrikes against Iran, it was reported that the U.S. was moving forces east over the Atlantic Ocean, including at least 31 air tankers to Europe, an unusually large number.

On June 19, Trump issued a statement via White House Press Secretary Karoline Leavitt, saying, "Based on the fact that there's a substantial chance of negotiations that may or may not take place with Iran in the near future, I will make my decision whether or not to go within the next two weeks." According to sources, on the same day, Israeli officials (including Netanyahu, Israel Katz and Eyal Zamir) called the Trump administration, saying that they could not wait two weeks; they thought they only had a small opportunity window. The phone call also included JD Vance, who pushed back against the Israelis citing concerns about direct U.S. involvement and being pulled into war; Pete Hegseth was also on the call. According to The Jerusalem Post, it took Netanyahu and Ron Dermer a week to convince Trump to bomb Iran, with Trump and Netanyahu speaking almost daily. According to the sources, Trump and senior U.S. officials had been impressed by Israel's achievements. Trump had only planned to bomb Fordow, but Netanyahu and Dermer convinced him to attack the other sites as well.

Final mission preparation was reportedly underway by June 20; according to the Associated Press, Trump's prior announcement of a two-week time frame was in actuality deception to obfuscate the impending attack. On June 21, the day before the attack, the United States deployed six B-2 stealth bombers westward over the Pacific Ocean towards Guam on a decoy mission, reportedly due to fears that Trump's social media posts from June 16 and 17 may have tipped off Iranian defenders. At the time, the media speculated that the bombers may have been heading towards Anderson Air Force Base. According to General Caine, the misdirection and secrecy was intended to "maintain tactical surprise" and that only "an extremely small number of planners and key leaders" knew the acute details of the operation. 4,000 American personnel were involved in the operation. A crew member told General Caine that preparation for the operation "felt like the Super Bowl, the thousands of scientists, airmen, and maintainers all coming together".

U.S. bases in the Middle East entered a state of highest alert and improved air defenses, while Iran threatened to strike any country assisting Israel. Most of the U.S. military aircraft parked on the tarmac at Al Udeid Air Base in Qatar were no longer visible on satellite imagery by June 19, suggesting they might have been evacuated in case of Iranian retaliation.

== Strikes ==
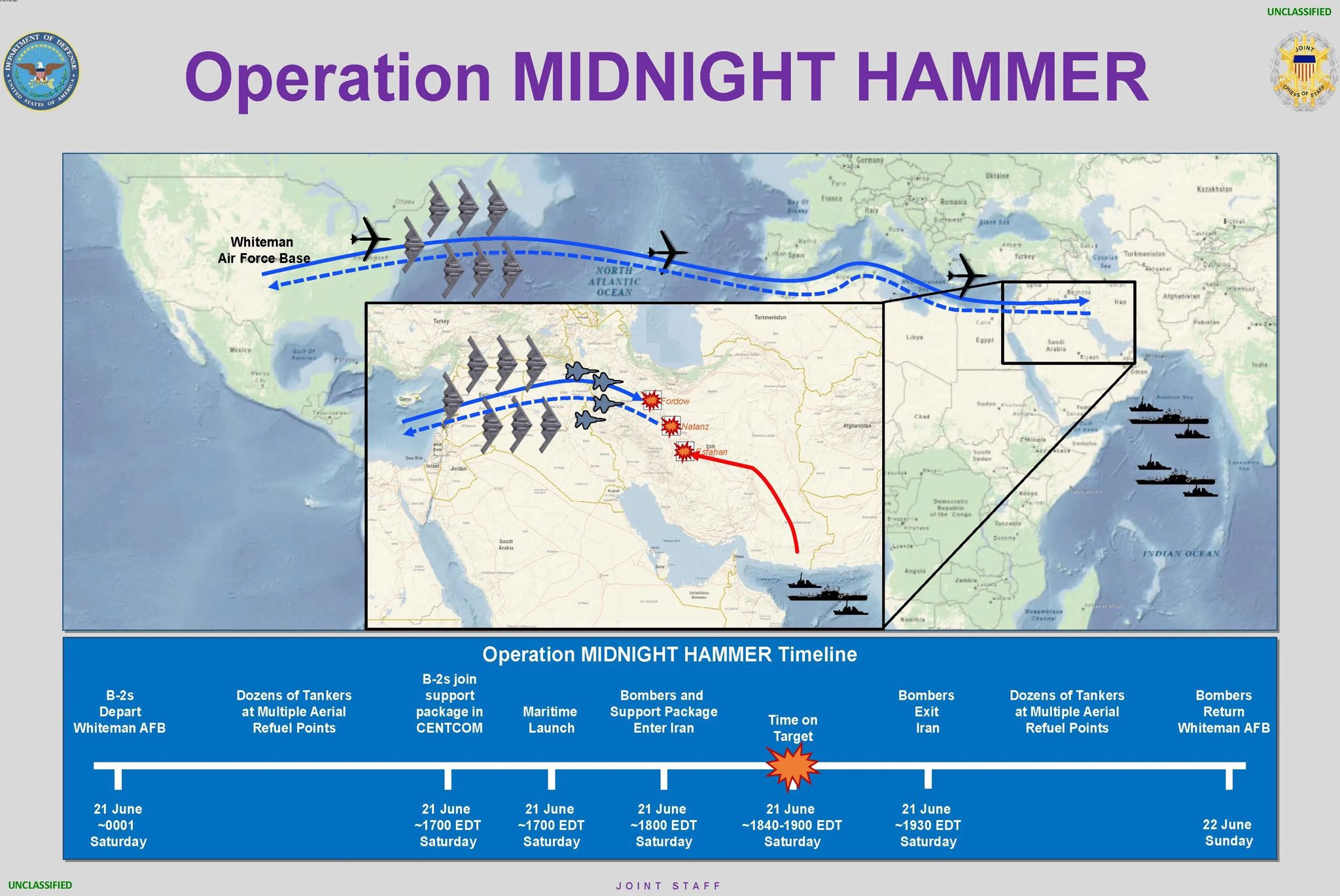
Timeline of Operation Midnight Hammer

B-2 Spirit bombers departing and returning to Whiteman Air Force Base during Operation Midnight Hammer

In an operation called "Midnight Hammer", on June 22 the United States Air Force and Navy attacked three Iranian nuclear facilities: Fordow, Natanz, and Isfahan. Seven B-2 bombers of the 509th Bomb Wing departed from Whiteman Air Force Base in Missouri and flew eastwards towards the Middle East continuously for 18 hours with minimal communication and refueling mid-air three times. The B-2s were preceded into Iranian airspace by fourth- and fifth-generation American fighter aircraft to draw any surface-to-air defensive fire; according to President Trump they were F-35 and F-22 stealth fighter jets. No Iranian defensive fire was detected, which was attributed to previous Israeli attacks against Iranian air defenses since June 13. According to the U.S. military, little to no resistance was observed from the Iranians during the mission.

At 6:40 pm EDT (2:10 am IRST), six B-2s began dropping 12 GBU-57A/B MOP bombs on the Fordow facility, and the seventh B-2 dropped two MOPs on Natanz. At Fordow, the 12 bunker buster bombs were dropped sequentially on two ventilation shafts to penetrate deeply into the mountain. According to Caine, four of the five bombs went down each of the two ventilation shafts after the first removed a defensive concrete cap: "The cap was forcibly removed by the first weapon and the main shaft was uncovered. Weapons two, three, four, five were tasked to enter the main shaft, move down into the complex at greater than 1,000 feet per second and explode in the mission space." A submarine also fired 30 Tomahawk missiles at the Natanz and Isfahan sites. U.S. officials did not name the submarine, but the USS Georgia had been in the region since September 2024. Natanz and Fordow were struck around 2:30 a.m. local time (23:00 the previous day UTC). The entire bombing lasted almost 30 minutes, with the Tomahawk strikes being the final attack.

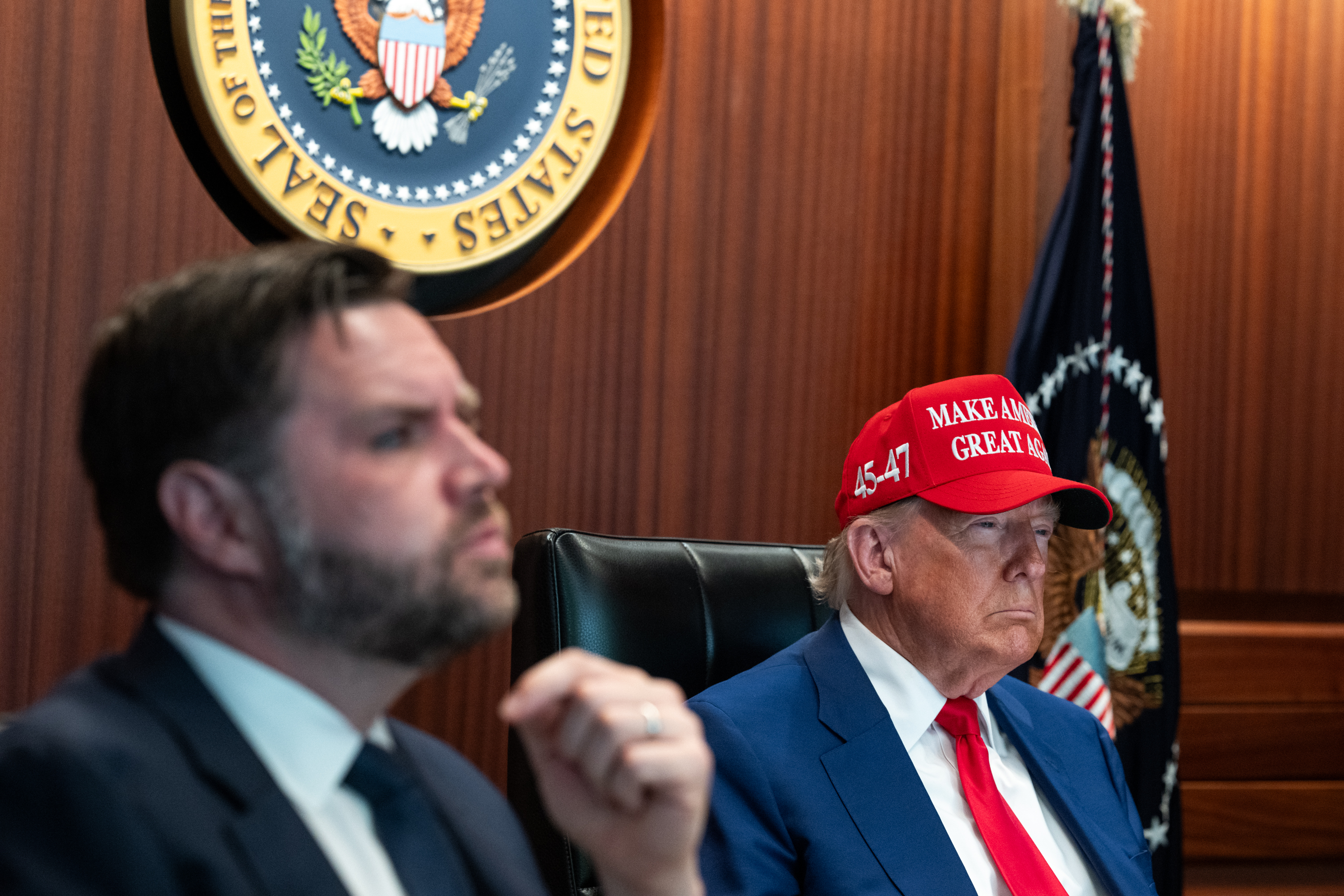
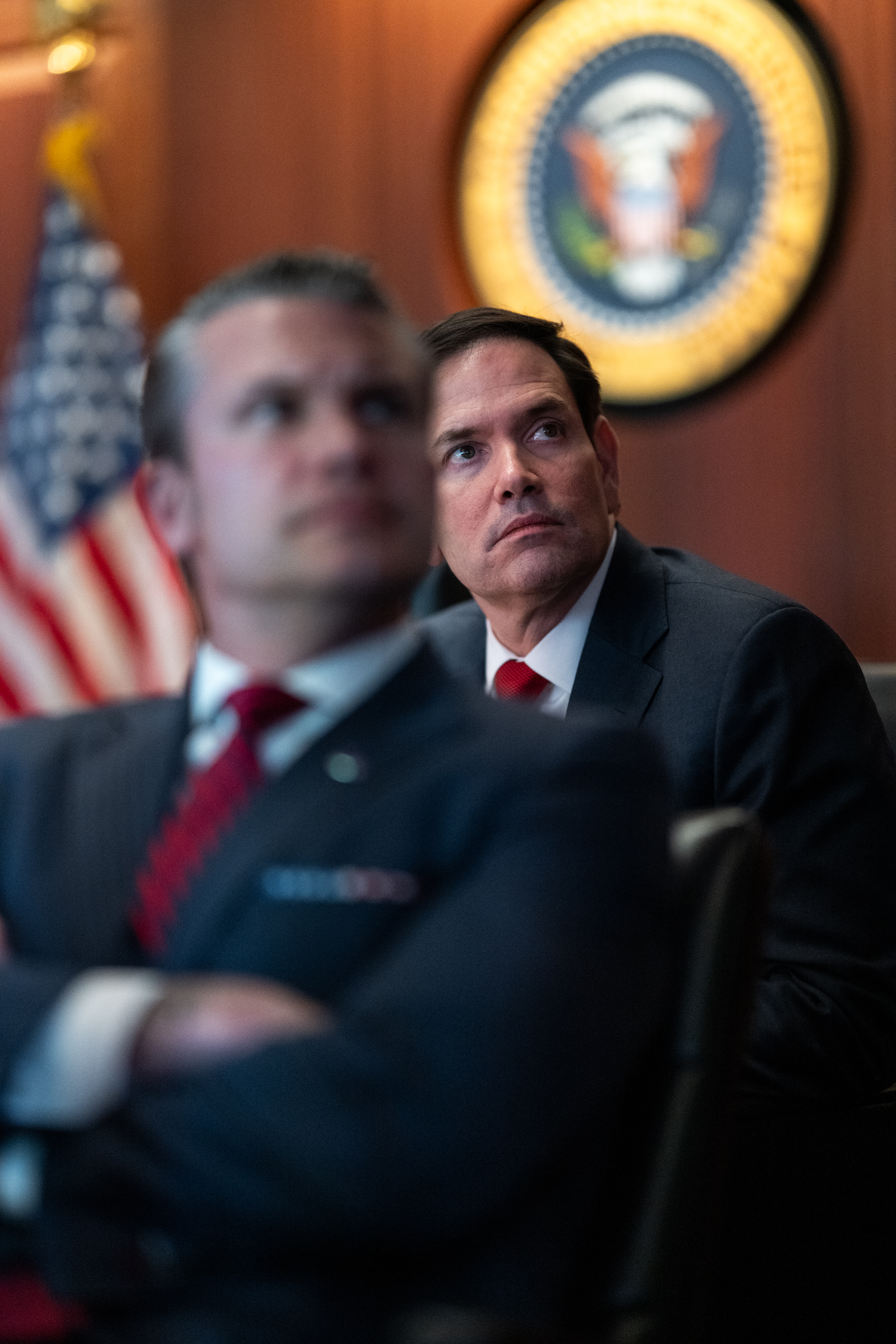
President Donald Trump, Vice President JD Vance, Secretary of State Marco Rubio, and Secretary of Defense Pete Hegseth in the Situation Room of the White House during the attacks, 21 June 2025 (EDT)

The B-2s flew continuously for roughly 37 hours during the mission—takeoff, strikes, and return trip—being refueled several times mid-air. In total, 125 aircraft were involved, including refueling and intelligence, surveillance, and reconnaissance aircraft. According to Trump, a total of about 52 refueling aircraft participated in the operation. General Caine added that both male and female aviators were involved in the operation, both from the active duty Air Force and the Missouri Air National Guard, with a U.S. official clarifying one of the B-2 pilots was female. "Our B-2s went in and out and back without the world knowing at all," Hegseth would later remark. A graphic released by the Pentagon after the mission suggested the strike package flew over Lebanon, Syria and Iraq and it remained unclear if they were given advanced notice of American air activity.

=== Damage ===
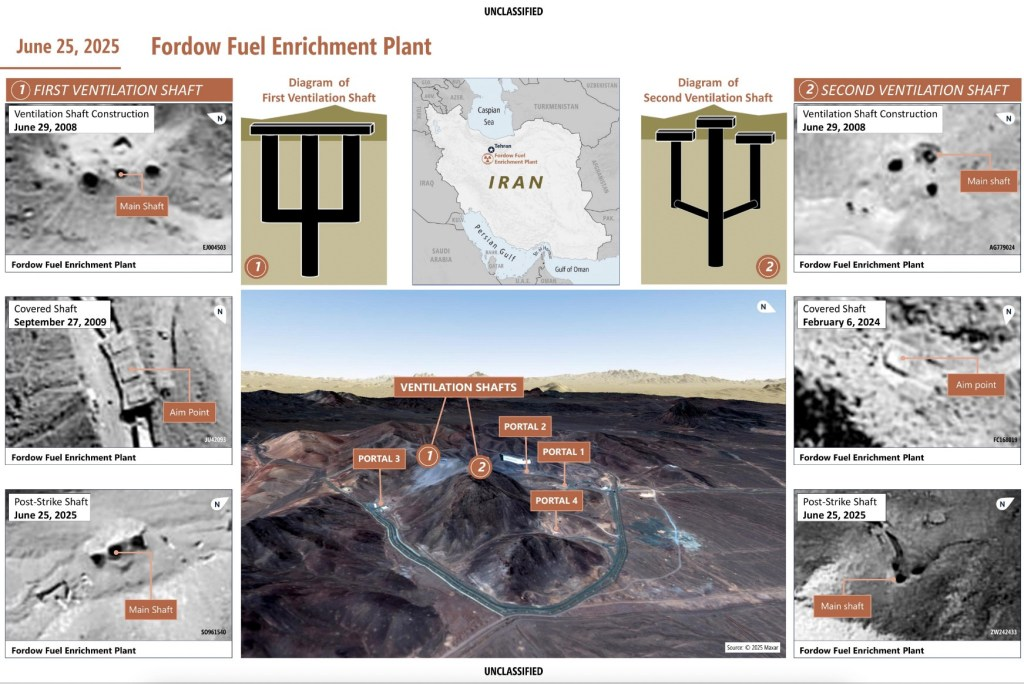
Pentagon graphic depicting the layout of Fordow's ventilation shafts and damage inflicted

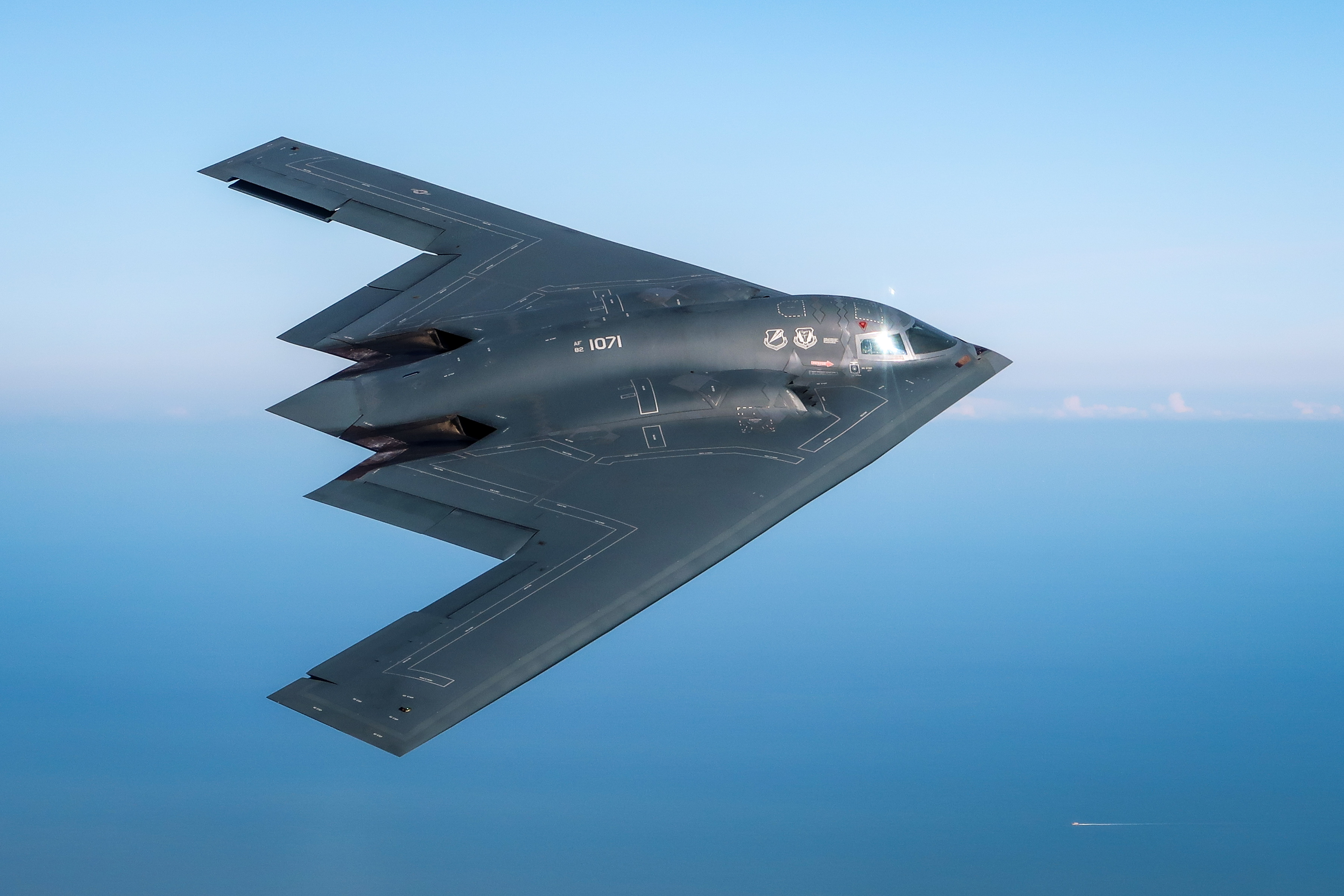
A Northrop B-2 Spirit bomber, used by the U.S. in the operation

Satellite images of the Fordow site taken after the strikes showed two clusters of apparent bomb entry points, as well as gray-blue ash covering the area. Caine stated that the Iranian nuclear sites had sustained "severe damage" from the strikes, but said that damage assessment would take time. Israeli officials speaking to The New York Times said the Israeli military assessed Fordow to be seriously damaged but not destroyed; an American official said Fordow was not destroyed, but seriously damaged and "off the table." Although a leaked early report from the U.S. Defense Intelligence Agency (DIA) reported that the strikes set back Iran's nuclear program by months, and that the sites targeted were significantly damaged but not destroyed, the Pentagon has since stated that it set back Iran by one to two years, with military figures believing that it was closer to two years. The initial assessment was rejected by Trump administration officials; Director of National Intelligence Tulsi Gabbard and CIA director John Ratcliffe both said "new intelligence" revealed that the Natanz, Fordow and Esfahan sites were severely damaged and would require years to rebuild.

On June 25, Iranian Foreign Ministry spokesman Esmail Baghaei said that Iranian nuclear facilities "have been badly damaged". On June 26 and July 1, Iranian Foreign Minister Abbas Araghchi said the nuclear facilities have sustained "significant and serious damages."

IAEA director general Rafael Grossi said the sites suffered "severe damage" but not "total damage". On September 26, Grossi confirmed that "almost all sensitive equipment" at Fordow had been destroyed. However, he added that if Iran chose to further enrich their existing stockpile of uranium to 90 percent, it would only take them a few weeks to complete the process.

== Aftermath ==
=== Trump administration statements ===
President Donald Trump Delivers Address to the Nation, June 21, 2025 (4:13)
Trump addresses the nation regarding the strikes, June 21, 2025 (EDT)

Donald Trump addresses the nation on the United States strikes on Iranian nuclear sites during the Twelve-Day War
audio only version

Secretary of Defense Pete Hegseth and Chairman of the Joint Chiefs of Staff Dan Caine conduct a press briefing at the Pentagon, June 22, 2025

Following the strikes, Trump wrote on Truth Social:

We have completed our very successful attack on the three nuclear sites in Iran, including Fordow, Natanz, and Esfahan. All planes are now outside of Iran air space. A full payload of BOMBS was dropped on the primary site, Fordow. All planes are safely on their way home. Congratulations to our great American Warriors. There is not another military in the World that could have done this. NOW IS THE TIME FOR PEACE! Thank you for your attention to this matter.

Trump gave a short televised address at 10 p.m. EDT on June 21, in which he said, "Iran's key nuclear enrichment facilities have been completely and totally obliterated". During his statement, which was about four minutes long, he further called the strikes a "spectacular military success", confirmed the earlier reporting, and warned of more attacks if Iran did not seek peace. He concluded by saying "God bless the Middle East, God bless Israel, and God bless America."

Immediately after the statement, Trump posted on Truth Social in all caps saying that "Any retaliation by Iran against the United States of America will be met with force far greater than what was witnessed tonight."

On June 22, Hegseth and Caine gave more details of the operation at a morning press conference at the Pentagon. The operation was "the largest B-2 operational strike in U.S. history, and the second longest B-2 mission ever flown, exceeded only by those in the days following 9/11," according to Caine. Hegseth also hailed the mission as a success and said that regime change was not a goal of the operation. In interviews the next day, Vance and Rubio also said that regime change was not a goal of the operation. A few hours later, Trump suggested that he would be open to seeing regime change in Iran.

Later, Vance and other U.S. officials conceded that they did not know where Iran's stockpile of enriched uranium was, and that it had likely been moved away from Fordow before the strikes.

The Trump administration maintained that, regardless of the strikes, it continued to pursue diplomacy with Iran via special envoy Steve Witkoff, although no meeting between US and Iranian delegations had been scheduled by June 26.

On June 27, during a White House news conference, Trump said he would "absolutely" consider bombing Iranian nuclear sites again if he deemed it necessary, while adding that he would like to see the IAEA or an equivalent authority be able to inspect the Fordow, Natanz and Esfahan sites. According to IAEA chief Rafael Grossi, no inspections had taken place since Israel began bombing Iran on June 13. Trump also criticized Iranian Supreme Leader Ali Khamenei's comments that were made a day prior on June 26, calling them "a statement of anger, hatred, and disgust". Trump insisted that he knew Khamenei's sheltered location during the war and spared his life by preventing the Israelis and U.S. forces from assassinating him. He also said that he was planning to provide sanctions relief to Iran but changed his mind following Khamenei's defiant remarks.

==== Leaked DIA assessment ====
On June 24, CNN and The New York Times reported that the DIA had produced a classified preliminary bomb damage assessment. This initial assessment indicated that the strikes damaged above-ground structures and sealed the entrances to two targets, but did not destroy the associated underground facilities and the centrifuges required to produce enriched uranium for a nuclear weapon. The report concluded that the United States had not destroyed Iran's nuclear program, but delayed it a few months. A DIA spokesperson, and later Hegseth, said the leaked assessment was "low confidence." David Albright, of the Institute for Science and International Security, noted that the report preceded newer information that "more enriched uranium stocks are in the rubble than believed" previously, and described the report as "a worst case assessment". CNN quoted Jeffrey Lewis, an expert in nuclear nonproliferation, as saying that publicly available information indicated that the strikes had not destroyed the facilities. As of June 24, work on a final damage assessment was underway.

On June 25, Hegseth reiterated that "Iran's nuclear program is obliterated" and said the Pentagon was investigating the leaked DIA assessment, which was "a top secret intelligence analysis that very few people in the United States government had access to see", according to White House press secretary Leavitt. In response to the leak, the White House reportedly planned to limit the amount of classified information it shares with Congress in the future.

On August 22, the Trump administration fired DIA director Lt. Gen. Jeffrey Kruse.

==== Congressional briefing ====
Trump formally notified Congress of the strikes on June 23, stating the operation was necessary "to advance vital United States national interests, and in collective self-defense of our ally, Israel, by eliminating Iran's nuclear program".

Classified briefings to Congress regarding the strikes were postponed from June 24 to 26. A White House official said the postponement was due to "evolved circumstances as a result of recent positive developments in the Middle East." Senate Democratic leader, Chuck Schumer, called the postponed intelligence briefing "outrageous" and accused the Trump administration of stonewalling. The Senate intelligence briefing reportedly took place on the afternoon of June 26, led by Hegseth, Rubio and Ratcliffe; Gabbard was reportedly not present. The intelligence briefing with the House of Representatives reportedly took place on June 27.

After the briefings, Schumer and Connecticut Democrat Chris Murphy remained skeptical of the Trump administration's claims of "obliterating" Iran's nuclear program, with Schumer decrying a lack of "adequate answers" and demanding Congress enforce the War Powers Resolution. In contrast, Trump ally Lindsey Graham reaffirmed that the strikes "obliterated" the three sites and delayed the Iranian nuclear program by years, not months, but warned that Iran likely still desired a nuclear weapon. Jim Himes, the ranking Democrat on the House Intelligence Committee, commented "The only question that matters is whether the Iranian regime has the stuff necessary to build a bomb, and if so, how fast". Reportedly while the congressional briefings were ongoing, Trump, via Truth Social, publicly accused the Democrats of leaking the draft DIA assessment.

=== Iranian response ===
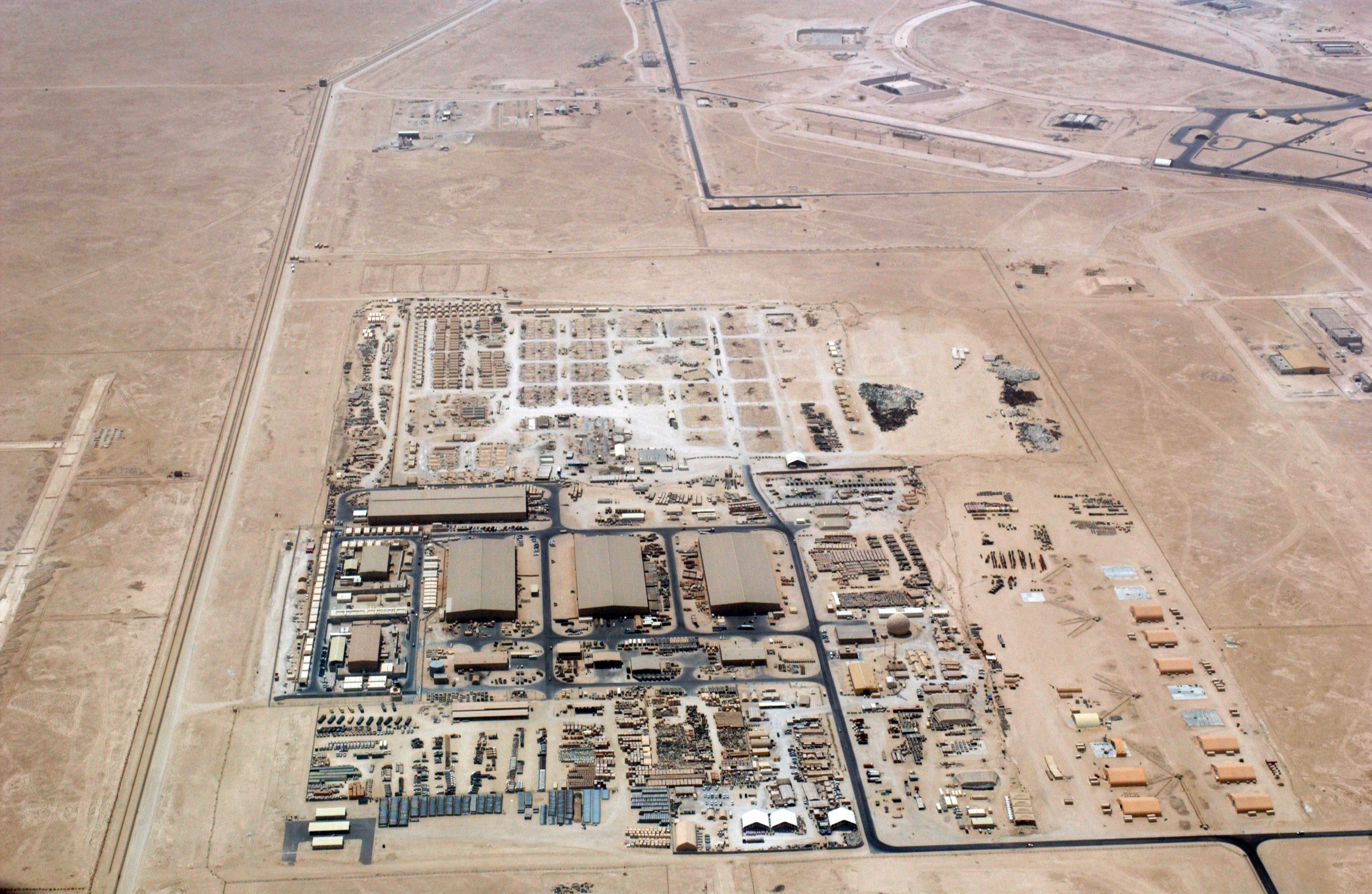
The Al Udeid Air Base (pictured in 2004), where Iran launched retaliatory missile strikes on June 23

Iran's state media agency, IRNA, quoting an Iranian official, reported that there was no radioactive material at the three sites which were targeted. Morteza Heidari, spokesperson for the Emergency Committee of the City of Qom, said that enemy forces had bombed "parts of the Fordo nuclear facility". Iranian officials have said that there is no danger to the residents living near the nuclear facilities that were hit by the U.S. strikes, according to Iranian state media. Quoting the Crisis Management Headquarters in the province of Qom, where the Fordow facility is located, IRNA stated, "there is no danger to the people of Qom and the surrounding area". According to Iranian officials, nuclear material had already been evacuated and moved elsewhere before the strikes.

Magen David Adom said that at least 16 people in Israel were wounded by Iranian missiles launched in retaliation for the overnight strikes. On June 22, Iranian media also reported that Majid Masibi, who the Islamic Republic accused of "spying for Israel", had been executed.

On June 22, 2025, the Iranian parliament approved a motion calling for the closure of the Strait of Hormuz, a key maritime corridor through which nearly 20% of the world's oil and liquefied natural gas is transported. The vote, described by Iranian media as politically significant, does not constitute an immediate closure; the measure must still be ratified by the Supreme National Security Council, which holds final authority over national security decisions. As of June 23, international shipping continued through the strait under heightened alert, with some commercial operators pausing transits and others reporting increased caution due to the deteriorating security situation. The presence of Islamic Revolutionary Guard Corps (IRGC) vessels in the area was also observed, contributing to concerns over maritime safety.

On June 23, Iran attacked a U.S. base in Qatar in retaliation to the U.S. strikes. Qatar had closed its airspace before the missiles arrived, and claimed to have intercepted all of them. After the attack, the United Arab Emirates, Bahrain, Kuwait, and Iraq also closed their airspaces. The attack was met with condemnation throughout the Arab world. The next day Trump announced a ceasefire which Iran and Israel subsequently confirmed, ending the conflict.

On June 26, Supreme Leader Khamenei delivered his first televised remarks since the ceasefire, voicing defiance and rejecting Trump's previous calls for an Iranian surrender. Khamenei declared victory for Iran and called the Al Udeid Air Base attack a slap in the face to the U.S. and insisted Iran would strike U.S. bases in the region again in response to a future U.S. attack.

=== Oil and gas prices ===
On June 23, 2025, global oil prices were not strongly affected; the Strait of Hormuz, remained open as a result of diplomacy efforts and the cease fire agreement. Brent Oil (and Murban Oil) prices were below $70 again. Similarly, the EU price of natural gas dropped 14 percent on June 24, as some of its LNG also comes through the Strait of Hormuz. Brent Oil prices further decreased to $67 per barrel by June 25, with the national average price of gasoline in the United States reaching a four-year low of around $3.20 on June 26.

== Reactions ==
=== United States ===
The Metropolitan Police Department of the District of Columbia and the New York Police Department increased security around religious institutions following the strikes. Later, on June 22, the U.S. State Department ordered the departure of family members and non-emergency U.S. government personnel from Lebanon. By June 26, U.S. Immigration and Customs Enforcement had arrested 130 and detained 670 Iranian nationals throughout the country amid heightened security concerns over Iranian sleeper cell activity and potential retaliatory terror attacks in response to the strikes.

The Joint Maritime Information Center (JMIC) of the UK Maritime Trade Operations (UKMTO) issued an urgent advisory warning that the threat to US-associated commercial shipping in the Red Sea, the Bab-el-Mandeb Strait, and the Gulf of Aden was "high," citing escalating regional tensions. US-associated vessels were defined as those flagged, owned, operated, chartered, or carrying American-linked cargo. The advisory urged such vessels to exercise extreme caution, consider rerouting, and adhere to maritime security best practices, while noting that non-American and non-Israeli vessels faced a lower but still present threat level.

Domestic reactions to the strikes were generally mixed. Senator Lindsey Graham praised the strikes, stating that it was "the right call" and "the regime deserves it". House speaker Mike Johnson released a statement, saying: "President Trump has been consistent and clear that a nuclear-armed Iran will not be tolerated [...] That posture has now been enforced with strength, precision and clarity." Chair of the Senate Intelligence Committee Tom Cotton of Arkansas tweeted, "President Trump made the right call and the ayatollahs should recall his warning not to target Americans." Senator Mitch McConnell of Kentucky said the strikes were a "prudent response to the warmongers in Tehran". Senate Majority Leader John Thune argued that the action was needed after previous failed diplomatic efforts: "The regime in Iran, which has committed itself to bringing 'death to America' and wiping Israel off the map, has rejected all diplomatic pathways to peace." Senator Tim Sheehy of Montana called the strikes the "right decision." Senator Ted Cruz of Texas said in a statement: "Tonight's actions have gone far in foreclosing that possibility, and countering the apocalyptic threat posed by an Iranian nuclear arsenal." Chair of the House Intelligence Committee Rick Crawford praised Trump and stated: "I have been in touch with the White House before this action and will continue to track developments closely with them in the coming days."

Former Florida governor and 2016 presidential candidate Jeb Bush, Ambassador Mark Wallace, Frances Townsend, and Tom Tugendhat released a joint statement, saying: "We applaud President Trump and the United States for this decision–one of the most important of the 21st century."

Texas congressman Tony Gonzales (R-Texas 23rd) proposed a new Iranian Campaign Service Medal for Operation Midnight Hammer for the pilots and support personnel of the aircraft involved. In June 2025 he filed H.R. 4254 Iranian Campaign Medal Act that expanded eligibility to the entire Twelve-Day War.

Democratic senator from Pennsylvania John Fetterman was the first Democratic senator to praise the strikes, saying: "As I've long maintained, this was the correct move by @POTUS. Iran is the world's leading sponsor of terrorism and cannot have nuclear capabilities. I'm grateful for and salute the finest military in the world." Fetterman previously stated that he hopes "the president finally does bomb and destroy the Iranians." In contrast, Democratic Representative Diana DeGette said Trump's "reckless actions are going to put the lives of American service members and American citizens at risk". Democratic Representative Ro Khanna, on the House Armed Services Committee, said, "The reality is, people want regime change in Iran, and they are egging this president on to bomb."

The strikes were criticized by several commentators who were usually supportive of Trump, including Steve Bannon, Tucker Carlson and Theo Von, who saw them as a reversal of his prior anti-interventionist rhetoric. Republican Representative Marjorie Taylor Greene stated, "this is not our fight", and criticized the rationale for the strikes, noting, "There would not be bombs falling on the people of Israel if Netanyahu had not dropped bombs on the people of Iran first." Former U.S. ambassador to the UN and National Security Advisor under the Trump's first term John Bolton praised the strikes.

The Council on American-Islamic Relations National Executive Director Nihad Awad said, "We condemn President Trump's illegal and unjustified act of war against Iran. This attack, carried out under pressure from the out-of-control Israeli government, took place despite the longstanding conclusion by our nation's intelligence community that Iran was not seeking nuclear weapons." He drew comparison with President George W. Bush's "disastrous" 2003 war in Iraq.

Fareed Zakaria believed the strikes undermined the rules-based international order and that US attacks will not prevent Iran from obtaining nuclear weapons in the long term. He argues that the only way to ensure that Iran does not obtain nuclear weapons is through diplomacy.

Masih Alinejad, an Iranian-American journalist and activist, opined on X that the Fordow nuclear site "was never about peaceful energy. It was built under a mountain to hide a nuclear program from the world, while the regime told its own people they couldn't even afford clean water or shelter."

A CNN poll conducted by SSRS after the airstrikes showed that a majority of Americans disapproved of Trump's decision to launch airstrikes against Iran by a margin of 56% to 44%.

==== Legality concerns ====
The strikes reignited a debate over the constitutionality and limits of presidential war powers, particularly the president's ability to order military operations against Iran without prior consultation with Congress.

Democratic Representative Jim Himes replied to Trump's post announcing the strikes, writing: "According to the Constitution we are both sworn to defend, my attention to this matter comes BEFORE bombs fall. Full stop." He later said in a statement, "Donald Trump's decision to launch direct military action against Iran without Congressional approval is a clear violation of the Constitution, which grants the power to declare war explicitly to Congress" and "It is impossible to know at this stage whether this operation accomplished its objectives." Democratic House minority leader Hakeem Jeffries said, "President Trump misled the country about his intentions, failed to seek congressional authorization for the use of military force and risks American entanglement in a potentially disastrous war in the Middle East".

Republican Representative Thomas Massie condemned the strikes as "not constitutional" and said there was no "imminent threat to the United States" from Iran. Democratic Representative Alexandria Ocasio-Cortez (NY-14) said that Trump's actions were "clearly grounds for impeachment". Independent Senator Bernie Sanders of Vermont received news of the strikes while at a "Fighting Oligarchy" rally in Tulsa, and called them "alarming" and "grossly unconstitutional". Republican Representative Warren Davidson tweeted, "it's hard to conceive a rationale that's Constitutional".

According to a CNN poll conducted by SSRS after the strikes, a majority of Americans — 65% — believed Trump should seek congressional authorization for any further military action, while 21% said he should not.

On June 27, the U.S. Senate voted to reject a war powers resolution introduced by Kaine days prior to the strikes and subsequent ceasefire. The measure, which sought to force the president to receive congressional authorization before entering the Twelve-Day War, failed in a 47–53 vote. Republican Senator Rand Paul joined most Democrats in voting for the measure, while Democrat John Fetterman joined most Republicans in rejecting the measure. Paul voiced continued concerns that although the strikes may have been a tactical success, the operation may ultimately be a strategic failure. In the House of Representatives, Thomas Massie and other Republicans reportedly appeared to no longer want to force a vote on a resolution as long as the ceasefire held. House Speaker Johnson said the efforts were now a "moot point" due to the ceasefire and that "it has zero chance of passing anyway."

=== Iran ===
Iranian Foreign Minister Abbas Araghchi condemned the strikes as a "reckless violation of the UN Charter and international law" and stated "Iran reserves all options to defend its sovereignty, interest, and people." Iranian advisor Mehdi Mohammadi claimed that Iran was not surprised by the attack and had been expecting it for some time, and that Fordow was evacuated and no irreversible damage was sustained.

The Atomic Energy Organization of Iran (AEOI) has called the U.S. attacks "a barbaric act that violated international law, especially the Nuclear Non-Proliferation Treaty", and that it planned to both seek justice in international court and continue its nuclear program. The AEOI stated in a social media post that the radiation system data and field surveys do not show any signs of contamination or dangers to the residents near the sites of Fordow, Isfahan and Natanz.

The Islamic Republic of Iran's armed forces announced that the flight paths of the planes participating in the attack had been identified and were being monitored. They said that the attacks on Israel and the destruction of its infrastructure would continue with vigor.

Seyed Hossein Mousavian, a former Iranian diplomat who participated in nuclear negotiations in the early 2000s, believes that this is a narrative and rhetorical game used as a cover to justify military action and regime change: "They were never looking for weapons. This is really a fake and fabricated narrative, like the one they created for the invasion of Iraq."

On June 26, Khamenei resurfaced to warn the United States against future attacks.

On July 2, Iran suspended cooperation with the International Atomic Energy Agency (IAEA). "This suspension will remain in effect until certain conditions are met, including the guaranteed security of nuclear facilities and scientists," Iranian state television reported. Iran also criticized the International Atomic Energy Agency and its director, Grossi, for not condemning the US and Israel for attacking its nuclear facilities.

=== Israel ===
Israel closed its airspace in response to the strikes.

Netanyahu congratulated Trump, stating that his "bold decision" to target Iran's nuclear facilities with the "righteous and awesome might of the United States" would be a "historic turning point", and said that Trump "has done what no other country on earth could do. History will record that President Trump acted to deny the world's most dangerous regime the world's most dangerous weapons." Former defense minister Yoav Gallant said Trump had made a "bold decision for the United States, for Israel, for all of humanity". President Isaac Herzog tweeted, "In the pages of human history, this is a moment when the principles of liberty, responsibility, and security have triumphed." and "Thank you, United States of America."

=== International ===
List of reactions from governments around the world
- Algeria: The Foreign Ministry expressed its deep concerns over the escalation "which worsens the situation in the region and exposes it to unprecedented risks with unpredictable consequences".
- Albania: Prime Minister Edi Rama expressed full support for Trump's efforts to prevent Iran from acquiring nuclear weapons. He denounced Iran's government: "This is not just another nuclear state. Nor merely a dictatorship with nuclear ambitions. This is a theocracy — armed with apocalyptic rhetoric, steeped in endless years of branding free nations as "Satanic", and openly calling for their annihilation".
- Argentina: President Javier Milei celebrated the attacks, stating that "today is a great day for Western civilization".
- Australia: Prime Minister Anthony Albanese and Foreign Minister Penny Wong expressed support for America's strikes. The Liberal–National Coalition fully backed the strikes."
- Austria: Chancellor Christian Stocker stated that the "Iranian nuclear program is a cause for great concern".
- Belgium: Foreign minister Maxime Prévot said, "the theocratic regime of the mullahs of Iran must not be allowed to develop a nuclear weapon, as it would be a threat to international security".
- Bolivia: President Luis Arce condemned the attacks, stating that "bombing targets of this nature not only endangers regional and global peace, but also violates fundamental principles of international law and the UN Charter."
- Brazil: Itamaraty released a note affirming that Brazil condemned the attacks "with vehemence", classifying it as a violation of Iran's sovereignty. The note further says that Brazil is against the proliferation of nuclear technology except for pacific means, and defended a diplomatic solution.
- Canada: Prime Minister Mark Carney said, "...Iran can never be allowed to develop a nuclear weapon...the situation in the Middle East remains highly volatile. Canada calls on parties to return immediately to the negotiating table and reach a diplomatic solution to end this crisis."
- Chile: President Gabriel Boric condemned the attack on X, stating, "We demand and need peace," and called the U.S. action illegal: "Having power does not authorise you to use it in violation of the rules that we as humanity have given ourselves. Even if you are the United States."
- China: The foreign ministry condemned the strikes as a violation of the UN charter and international law.
- Cuba: President Miguel Díaz-Canel condemned the attacks as "a dangerous escalation of the conflict in the Middle East".
- Cyprus: Foreign Minister Constantinos Kombos said, "everything must be done to avoid further escalation," and, "restraint must prevail."
- Czechia: Prime Minister Petr Fiala stated, "Iran's nuclear program seriously threatens international security, and Saturday's US strike on three Iranian nuclear facilities is thus an understandable effort to prevent the development of nuclear weapons," and hoped "U.S. military action...will compel Iran to engage in talks."
- Denmark: Foreign Minister Lars Løkke Rasmussen said, "Iran must never develop nuclear weapons," and "the U.S. acted to prevent this." Rasmussen urged parties to negotiate.
- Egypt: Egypt called for a diplomatic solution and not a military solution.
- Estonia: Foreign Minister Margus Tsahkna said, "the U.S. strike on Iran's nuclear sites signals a firm stance against its nuclear ambitions," and "preventing escalation, protecting civilians, and restoring diplomacy are key."
- Finland: Prime Minister Petteri Orpo said it is important "Iran does not develop a nuclear weapon and no new nuclear-weapon state emerges in the world." President Alexander Stubb stated, "the spiral of vengeance in the Middle East must come to an end. A sustainable solution requires diplomacy, dialogue and respect for the international law."
- France: Foreign Minister Jean-Noël Barrot said France was "convinced that a lasting solution to this issue requires a negotiated solution within the framework of the Non-Proliferation Treaty". French President Emmanuel Macron called US strikes on Iran "illegal" and counterproductive.
- Germany: Chancellor Friedrich Merz called on Iran to immediately enter negotiations with the US and Israel to find a diplomatic solution. Merz voiced support for US strikes on Iran.
- Holy See: Pope Leo XIV called the situation in the Middle East "alarming" and called for diplomacy: "every member of the international community has a moral responsibility: stop the tragedy of war before it becomes an irreparable abyss".
- Hungary: Foreign Minister Péter Szijjártó said, "Hungary supports all efforts to bring peace to the Middle East as soon as possible," and "our interest is to prevent the emergence of any new nuclear weapon arsenals in the world."
- Iceland: Foreign Minister Þorgerður Katrín Gunnarsdóttir said, "Iran's nuclear program is of great concern and that we urge the leadership to negotiate in earnest to put an end to it" and "diplomacy and dialogue are the only way forward."
- Iraq: The government warned that the attack "constitutes a grave threat to peace and security in the Middle East and poses serious risks to regional stability."
- Ireland: Taoiseach Micheál Martin stated there is an "urgent need for de-escalation, dialogue & diplomacy in the Middle East," adding, "Iran should unequivocally disavow the development of nuclear weapons."
- Italy: Foreign Minister Antonio Tajani commented that after the US attacks, which "brought enormous damage to the production of nuclear weapons, which represented a danger for the entire area, we can truly arrive at a de-escalation", and called for Iran to negotiate.
- Japan: Prime Minister Shigeru Ishiba said the government was "monitoring the situation there with grave concern". He refrained from explicitly endorsing the attack, saying that it is "difficult for Japan to make a definitive legal evaluation at this point" and said the response "showed a determination to prevent Iran from possessing nuclear weapons while seeking to bring the situation under control quickly".
- Latvia: Prime Minister Evika Siliņa said, "Iran must never obtain a nuclear weapon" and that the "US addressed this serious threat to international security." Siliņa called for de-escalation and a return to talks.
- Lebanon: President Joseph Aoun said the bombing "raises the level of fear of an escalation of tensions that would threaten security and stability." Prime Minister Nawaf Salam said that Lebanon's best interest is to avoid "being dragged in any form into the ongoing regional confrontation", helping ease concerns about Hezbollah reacting to the strike.
- Lithuania: Foreign Minister Kęstutis Budrys called the U.S. strike "bold", saying that the strike "created an opportunity to return to the negotiation table and restart talks".
- Luxembourg: Foreign Minister Xavier Bettel said that while "nobody wants Iran to develop a nuclear bomb," he has "doubts that a military escalation to stop that is really a solution".
- Mexico: The Secretariat of Foreign Affairs called for urgent diplomatic dialogue between the involved parties and the de-escalation of tensions. President Claudia Sheinbaum called war "humanity's greatest failure," and called for the UN to lead peacebuilding efforts.
- Netherlands: Prime Minister Dick Schoof called the latest developments in the Middle East "worrying", reiterated the Dutch position: "Iran must not acquire a nuclear weapon," and stated, "negotiations are ultimately the only way out towards a sustainable solution."
- New Zealand: Foreign Minister Winston Peters released a statement describing ongoing military action in the Middle East as "extremely worrying", calling on all parties to return to talks and pursue a diplomatic solution.
- North Korea: A Foreign Ministry spokesperson condemned the attack stating "it violates UN Charter".
- Norway: Prime Minister Jonas Gahr Støre outlined "deep concern about the escalation of the war in the Middle East...the international community has long sought to ensure that Iran does not acquire nuclear weapons," and Norway "supports efforts for diplomacy and negotiations. This conflict has no military solution. International law must be respected by all parties...Last night's attack does not eliminate the need for a lasting agreement in the long run..."
- Oman: Oman expressed "deep concern, denunciation and condemnation of the escalation resulting from the direct air strikes launched by the United States".
- Pakistan: Pakistan condemned the U.S. strikes, terming them a violation of international law and a threat to regional peace. The Ministry of Foreign Affairs of Pakistan affirmed Iran's right to self-defense under the UN Charter and urged all parties to exercise restraint and resolve issues through diplomatic means, warning against further escalation.
- Paraguay: The Foreign Ministry expressed their support of the attacks, stating that "affirms its support for the people of Israel and the right to protect their existence."
- Philippines: The Department of Foreign Affairs expressed its concerns with the tensions between the US and Iran, stating that both parties should pursue diplomatic solutions and deescalate tensions "that could threaten regional and international peace and security."
- Portugal: Prime Minister Luís Montenegro expressed his preoccupation with "the risk of severe escalation in the Middle East" and called for "maximum restraint on all sides", also adding "Iran's nuclear program is a serious threat to world security".
- Qatar: The Foreign Ministry warned, "dangerous tensions will lead to disastrous repercussions at the regional and international levels."
- Romania: The Ministry of Foreign Affairs posted "Romania has constantly emphasised that Iran's nuclear program is contrary to its international obligations," and "the U.S.' recent actions seek to eliminate a grave threat to world peace."
- Russia: The foreign ministry strongly condemned the strikes as "irresponsible" and said they constituted a "gross violation of international law, the UN charter, and resolutions of the UN security council". Russian President Vladimir Putin condemned the United States strikes as an "unprovoked act of aggression," although at the same time he authorized Russian strikes against Ukraine. Deputy Chairman of the Russian Security Council Dmitry Medvedev has claimed, "countries are ready to directly supply Iran with their own nuclear warheads", and Iranian enrichment of nuclear material will continue in spite of the strikes. Medvedev's threats were criticized by US President Trump.
- Saudi Arabia: Saudi Arabia condemned "the violation of Iran's sovereignty and stresses the need for restraint."
- Slovakia: Foreign Minister Juraj Blanár stated, "any conflict must be resolved within the framework of the UN, not through the use of weapons, regardless of any good purported intentions," adding, "it is unacceptable for any state to conduct military operations on the territory of another sovereign state."
- Slovenia: Prime Minister Robert Golob called on "all parties to cease the hostilities and return to the negotiating table...Violence and military conflicts only lead to greater suffering of the innocent population of the Middle East."
- South Korea: Vice industry minister Moon Shin-hak expressed concern over the potential impact on the country's trade due to the U.S. strike. Officials reportedly held an emergency security meeting to assess the potential economic impact.
- Spain: The Ministry of Foreign Affairs released a statement saying "the situation must be resolved through diplomatic means," and "it is urgent...negotiations resume."
- Sweden: Prime Minister Ulf Kristersson said "What is now happening in an unstable region, risks making things considerably worse."
- Ukraine: The Ministry of Foreign Affairs praised the strikes, citing Iran's assistance to Russia in its invasion of Ukraine.
- United Arab Emirates: The government called for "immediate de-escalation" and a "comprehensive solution".
- United Kingdom: Prime Minister Keir Starmer said, "Iran can never be allowed to develop a nuclear weapon and the US has taken action to alleviate that threat," and asked Iran to "return to the negotiating table and reach a diplomatic solution to end this crisis". A government minister confirmed the UK had not taken part in the attack as there had been speculation the U.S. would ask for the use of the joint UK-US military base at Diego Garcia in the Indian Ocean, though by June 17, 2025, no B-2 bombers were seen to be stationed there. Foreign Secretary David Lammy refused to say whether the American strikes on Iran were legal. Shadow Foreign Secretary Dame Priti Patel released a video statement calling the strikes "absolutely necessary."
- Uruguay: The Foreign Ministry stated that "expresses its deep concern at the dangerous escalation of violence."
- Venezuela: Foreign Minister Yván Gil condemned the "military aggression against Iran" and demanded an "immediate cessation of hostilities".

=== Supranational ===
United Nations Secretary-General António Guterres described the strikes as "dangerous escalation" and called for diplomacy. The United Nations Security Council held an emergency meeting on the airstrikes at the request of Iran. In a private Signal message to Trump, NATO secretary general Mark Rutte praised and thanked Trump for his "decisive action" in Iran, calling it "truly extraordinary and something no one else dared to do."

On June 23, 2025, Grossi, the head of the IAEA, convened an emergency meeting and warned that the attack "risks collapsing the global nuclear nonproliferation regime" and of unimaginable destruction if the countries do not negotiate a peace. He asked Iran to allow IAEA inspectors to assess the damage, radiation levels, and release of toxins.

On June 23, 2025, European Commission President Ursula von der Leyen said that "Iran must never acquire the bomb."

=== Non-state actors ===
The strikes were condemned by Iran's Axis of Resistance allies in the region. Hamas condemned the strikes as a "blatant aggression". Hezbollah condemned the strikes as a "barbaric and treacherous American aggression against peaceful nuclear facilities" and affirmed its "complete solidarity" with Iran and "its leadership". However, Hezbollah said it would not retaliate, stating Iran is a "strong country capable of defending itself", and adding that the group remained committed to its previous ceasefire agreement with Israel.

The Houthis condemned the strikes as "a dangerous escalation and a direct threat to regional and international security and peace" and said, "Trump must bear the consequences." A senior Houthi official told Al Jazeera that its response to the US strikes was "only a matter of time." The group further threatened to end its prior ceasefire with the U.S. and resume attacking American ships in the Red Sea. However, there had been no resumption of hostilities until July 7, 2025, when they attacked a Liberian-flagged cargo ship in the Red Sea. The attack killed three mariners and wounded two others.

== Analysis ==
Ray Takeyh, a senior fellow at the Council on Foreign Relations, called the strikes "a new phase, and a potentially problematic one," and said that Iran "would have to essentially restore pride in some way," potentially by launching attacks on American military sites or proxies. Karim Sadjadpour, a senior fellow at the Carnegie Endowment for International Peace, noted, "This is more likely to open a new chapter of the 46-year-old U.S.–Iran war than conclude it", that most of the retaliatory options available to Iran are the "equivalent of a suicide bombing", and "this is a traumatic, humiliating event" for the Iranian population, leaving it unclear exactly how Iran will respond.

Amin Saikal, distinguished visiting fellow at Singapore's S Rajaratnam School of International Studies, and who is also an emeritus professor of Middle Eastern and Central Asian studies at the Australia National University, said Iran could block the Strait of Hormuz as a last resort as "Iran is capable of doing that by sinking a number of ships in the strait and that will be enough to deter many ships from going through."

Jonathan Panikoff, the director of the Scowcroft Middle East Security Initiative at the Atlantic Council, warned that Iran might respond disproportionally to restore deterrence, stating, "you're looking at a significant escalatory spiral that could get out of hand quickly."

Defense Priorities's Middle East program director, Rosemary Kelanic, also felt the strikes made it "much more likely that Iran will want to obtain nuclear weapons". Burcu Ozcelik, a senior research fellow with the Royal United Services Institute, said the attack was "yet another demonstration, from the hard-line Iranian point of view, that America can't be trusted".

A CNN analyst noted that the United States may still attack further targets given that there "is a real concern that now the Iranians will retaliate", and suggested that Iran could attack U.S. bases in Qatar, the United Arab Emirates, Saudi Arabia, and Bahrain, and potentially close the Strait of Hormuz.

According to Michael Tomasky, the strikes contradict the promise by Trump's campaign that he would be an anti-war president. According to James Risen, Trump is now more willing to listen to Israel than his predecessors and is also highly suspicious of the intelligence community, which "continues to assess that Iran is not building a nuclear weapon." Setareh Sadeghi, a professor at the Faculty of World Studies at the University of Tehran, rejects Israel's long-standing claim that Iran is "one month away" from achieving nuclear capability, saying: "While I totally disagree with nuclear weapons, I think if Israel, Pakistan, India, the U.S., France, and other countries have the right to have nuclear weapons, then any other country should also have it, and Iran does not have one."

The Economist reported, "even if America did not reach all parts of the Fordow complex, the powerful blasts might have done enough to damage or destroy the machinery inside", and cited nuclear weapons expert Richard Nephew who said, "Uncontrolled vibration ... is a centrifuge killer". Former IAEA inspector and Institute for Science and International Security founder David Albright told The Economist that destroying Fordow's ventilation shaft could disable the site for "a few years rather than a few months", and a weapons expert told The Economist that images after the strikes suggested the U.S. may have targeted Fordow's ventilation.

Former Supreme Allied Commander Europe Wesley Clark described the strikes as "a brilliant operation ... flawless in execution", and said that early reports such as the DIA report are often wrong. However, he said: "the big issue is ... read the words: 'severely damaged the program'. Didn't say they got all the highly enriched uranium; didn't say they couldn't build a nuclear device; didn't say a lot of things ... What we have, I'm afraid, is a wounded tiger." Similarly, retired general and former CIA director David Petraeus agreed with the CIA's assessment that the strike inflicted "severe damage" to Iran's nuclear program and noted that the DIA report was "low confidence", though said the "bigger question is, was there any highly enriched uranium that was stored elsewhere ... and are there centrifuges that are elsewhere as well."

In February 2026, The Guardian noted that the Trump administration’s use of Iran's nuclear program as justification for conflict against Iran contradicted Trump's prior claims that Iran's program was "obliterated". The New Republic observed that Operation Midnight Hammer had delayed a theoretical timeline for a nuclear bomb by nine to twelve months, and that the subsequent 2026 Iran war had thus far failed to further change such a timeline. In a congressional hearing for Secretary of Defense Pete Hegseth, representative Adam Smith argued that the Trump administration contradicted itself by claiming Operation Midnight Hammer's strikes on nuclear facilities were a success only for the US to enter another war against Iran to eliminate its nuclear capabilities still. The Independent remarked that Operation Midnight Hammer ultimately failed to "obliterate" Iran's nuclear ambitions like how "Operation Epic Fury" in 2026 failed to topple the Islamic Republic or force its surrender and claimed that Operation Project Freedom would end up in a similar fate. The National Interest noted that since the operation, the Trump administration kept boasting about Operation Midnight Hammer's bombing of nuclear facilities to the point of doubling down and claiming that any suggestions of otherwise are "fake news". However, according to the magazine, the Trump administration then abruptly nullified its talking points of the Iranian nuclear program no longer being an issue, such as from Trump claiming that Iran would have built a nuclear weapon if not for the 2026 war.

== See also ==
- Iran and weapons of mass destruction
- Rationale for the 2026 Iran war
