= Test Vehicle Abort Mission-1 =

2023 Indian space vehicle test flight

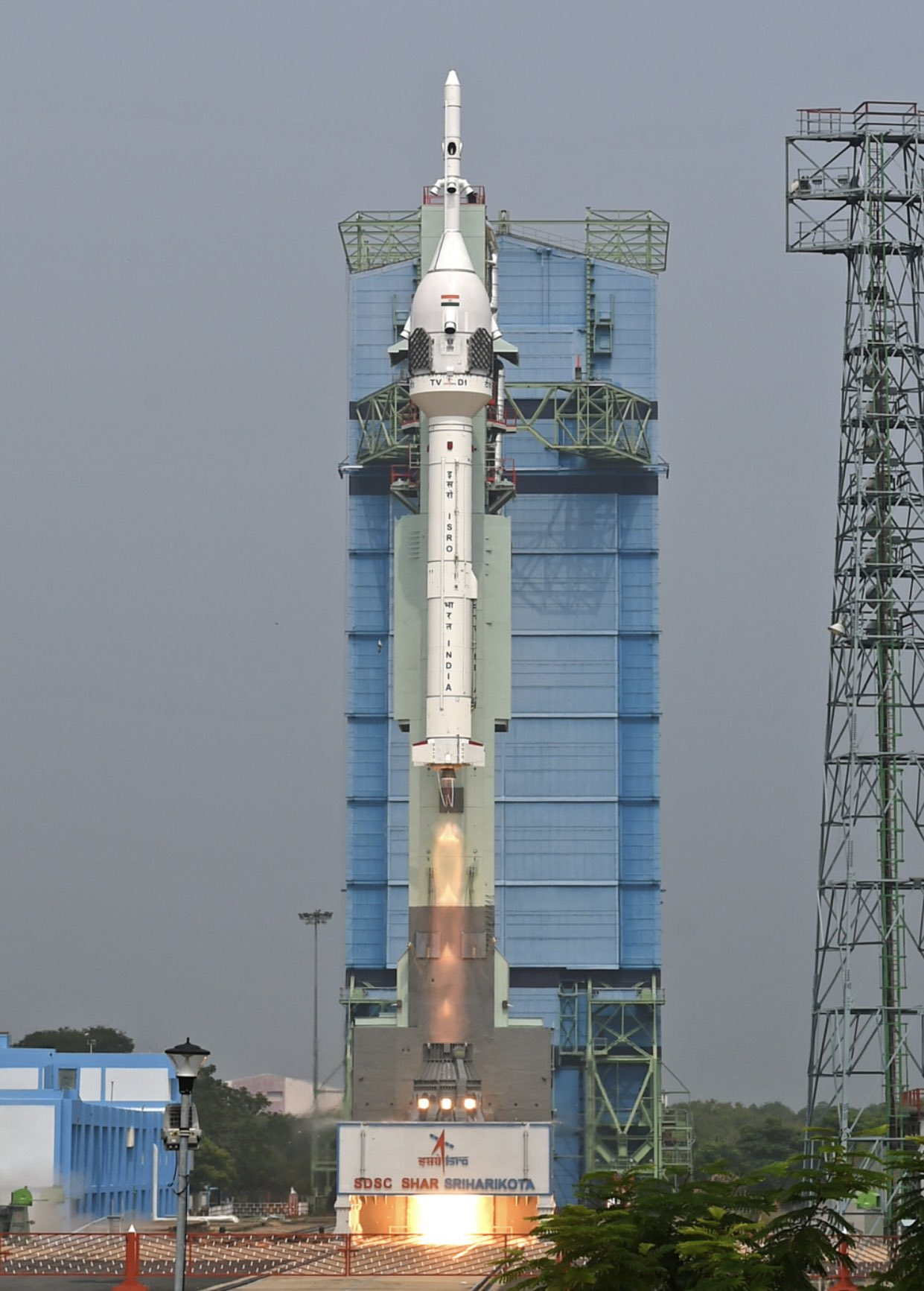
- TV-D1 lifts off
- Names: Test Vehicle Abort Mission-1; TV-D1
- Mission type: In-flight abort test
- Operator: ISRO
- Mission duration: 15 minutes (final)
- Apogee: 15 km (9.3 mi)

Spacecraft properties
- Spacecraft type: Gaganyaan
- Manufacturer: Hindustan Aeronautics Limited
- Launch mass: 44 Tons
- Landing mass: 4.5 tons
- Dry mass: 17 tons
- Dimensions: Length: 34.954 m Diameter: 2.1 m (stage), 4.05 m (CES)

Start of mission
- Launch date: 21 October 2023, 04:30 UTC (10:00 IST)
- Rocket: Gaganyaan Abort Test Booster (modified GSLV L40 stage)
- Launch site: First Launch Pad Satish Dhawan Space Centre

End of mission
- Landing date: 21 October 2023, 04:45 UTC (10:15 IST)
- Landing site: Bay of Bengal
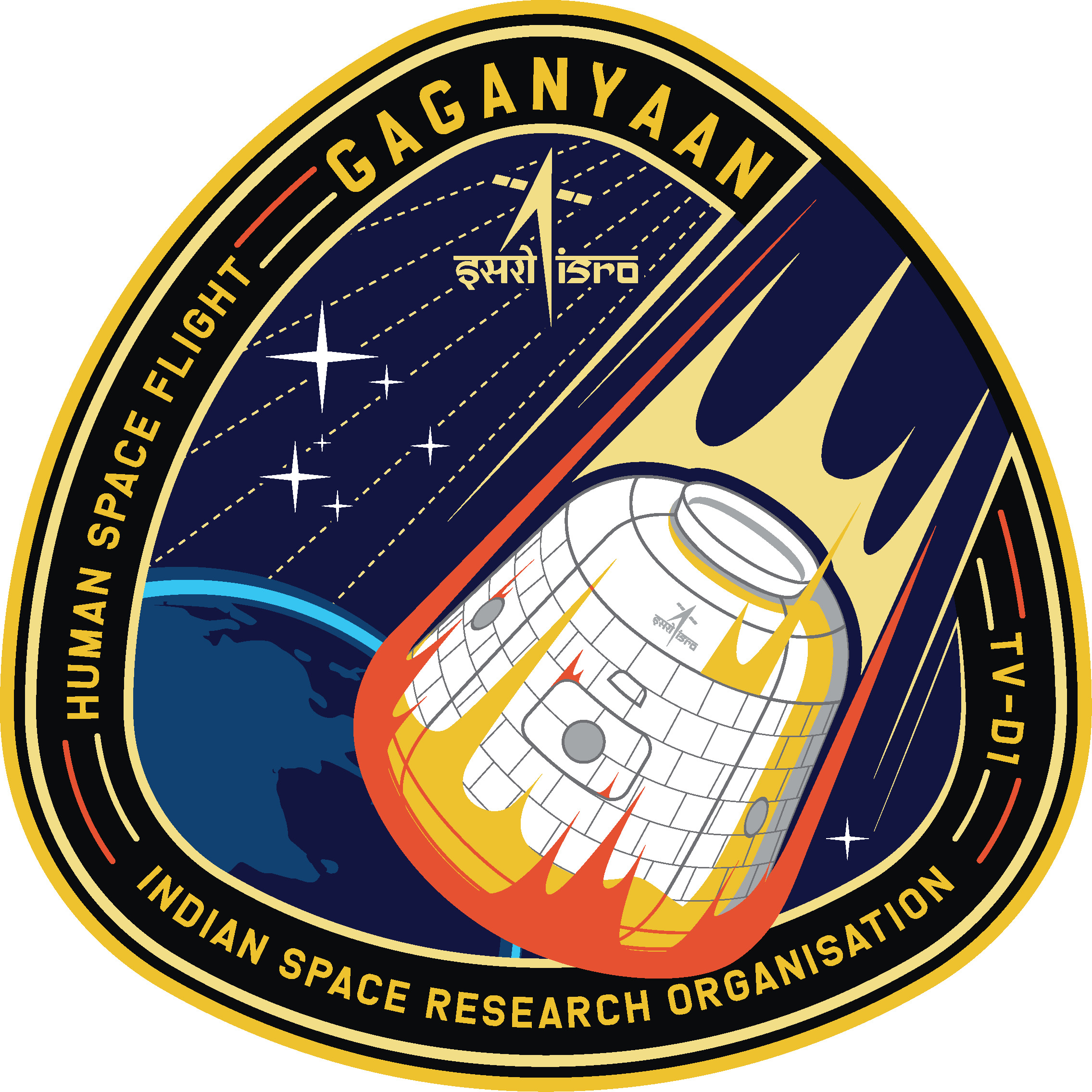
- Test Vehicle Abort Mission-1 Patch IHSP

Test Vehicle Abort Mission-1 (TV-D1) was a high altitude abort test performed as part of the Gaganyaan program, initially set to be held on 21 October 2023 at around 02:30 UTC (08:00 IST). Liftoff was delayed to 03:15 UTC due to weather issues, and five seconds before launch it was put on hold by the on-board computer due to an engine anomaly, as reported in ISRO's mission livestream. The launch occurred at 04:30 UTC, and the crew module successfully separated from the launch vehicle. The crew module was successfully recovered by the Indian Navy. India is the fourth country, after Russia, the United States, and China, to successfully test this technology.

== Background ==
In April 2022, it was proposed that both demonstration missions should have a depressurized crew module. On 10 August 2022 ISRO performed a successful static test of the Crew Escape System (CES). The crew module fairing and the high altitude abort engine were delivered by Hindustan Aeronautics Limited on 18 August 2022. In December 2022, the structural qualification test for the crew module fairing with grid fins was successfully completed for the TV-D1 configuration. In August 2023, the rocket was ready at Sriharikota and the test was scheduled for late September. TV-D1 is the first development flight from the Gaganyaan program. Gaganyaan-1, the first orbital test flight, is planned to take place in 2024.

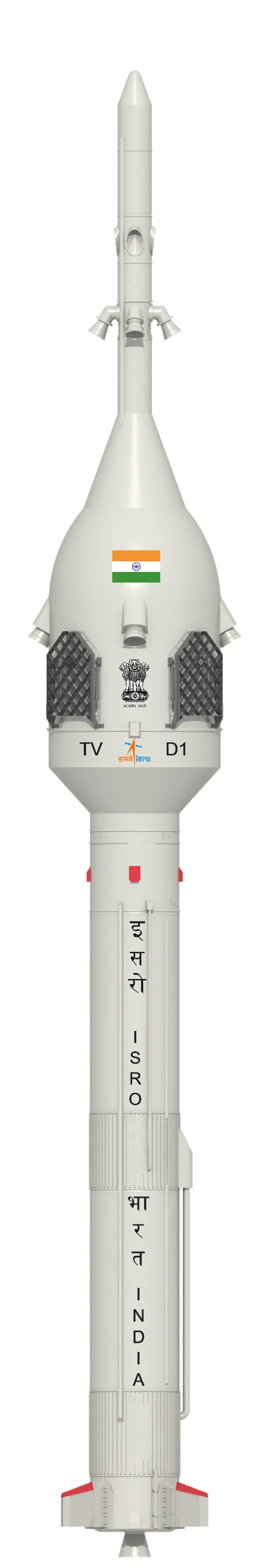
TV-D1

The crew module used for TV-D1, was an unpressurised version that had completed its integration testing. This unpressurised module was required to have an overall size and mass of an actual Gaganyaan crew module, and housed all systems required for deceleration and recovery, including a complete set of parachutes, recovery aids actuation systems, and pyros. The avionics systems operate in a dual-redundant mode for navigation, sequencing, telemetry, instrumentation, and power. The crew module in this mission was extensively instrumented to capture the flight data for evaluation of the performance of various systems. The crew module was planned to be recovered after touchdown in the Bay of Bengal using a dedicated vessel and diving team from the Indian Navy.

With a rocket based upon the GSLV L40 stage, TV-D1 was to be launched up to 11 kilometres (6.8 mi) above sea level, where an in-flight abort scenario would be initiated. The capsule was expected to then continue another 4–5 kilometres (2.5–3.1 mi). The mission aimed to test the CES's separation from the rocket, ability to maintain a trajectory leading to a safe distance, and eventual parachute deployment.

== Mission objectives ==
- Flight demonstration and evaluation of the test vehicle subsystems
- Flight demonstration and evaluation of the CES, including various separation systems
- Crew Module characteristics and demonstration of deceleration systems at higher altitude and its recovery

== Results ==
The launch occurred at 04:30 UTC, and was tracked by ground teams at Sriharikota. The crew module successfully separated from the launch vehicle and was recovered by INS Shakthi in the Bay of Bengal despite rough seas. ISRO plans to conduct further tests with the TV-D2 mission in 2025.

== Timeline ==
Sequence of flight events
Time	Event
TV Event
-3.4	Engine Ignition
+58.1	Pill Box Achieved
+58.5	Engine Cutoff
+60.9	TV-CES Sep
CES Event
+60.9	CMF•CSIA Sep
+60.9	CM•SM Sep
+60.9	HEM P+ Motor Ignition
+60.9	HEM P• Motor Ignition
+60.9	HEM Y+ Motor Ignition
+60.9	HEM Y• Motor Ignition
+61.5	CRID FIN-3 Deploy
+61.5	CRID FIN-4 Deploy
+61.6	CRID FIN-2 Deploy
+61.8	CRID FIN-1 Deploy
+90.9	CM•CES Sep
+90.9	CJM Ignition
CM Event
+0.4	Liftoff
+60.9	TV•(CES+CM) Sep
+90.9	CES•CM Sep
+96.2	APEX Cover Sep
+98.2	D-CHUTE Mortar Ign
+307.7	D-CHUTE Release
+307.9	Main Chute Deploy
+312.5	LT-UHF BEACON ON
+584.4	IMPACT SENSING

== Gallery ==
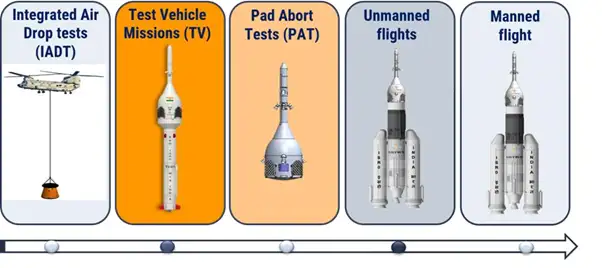
Gaganyaan development timeline

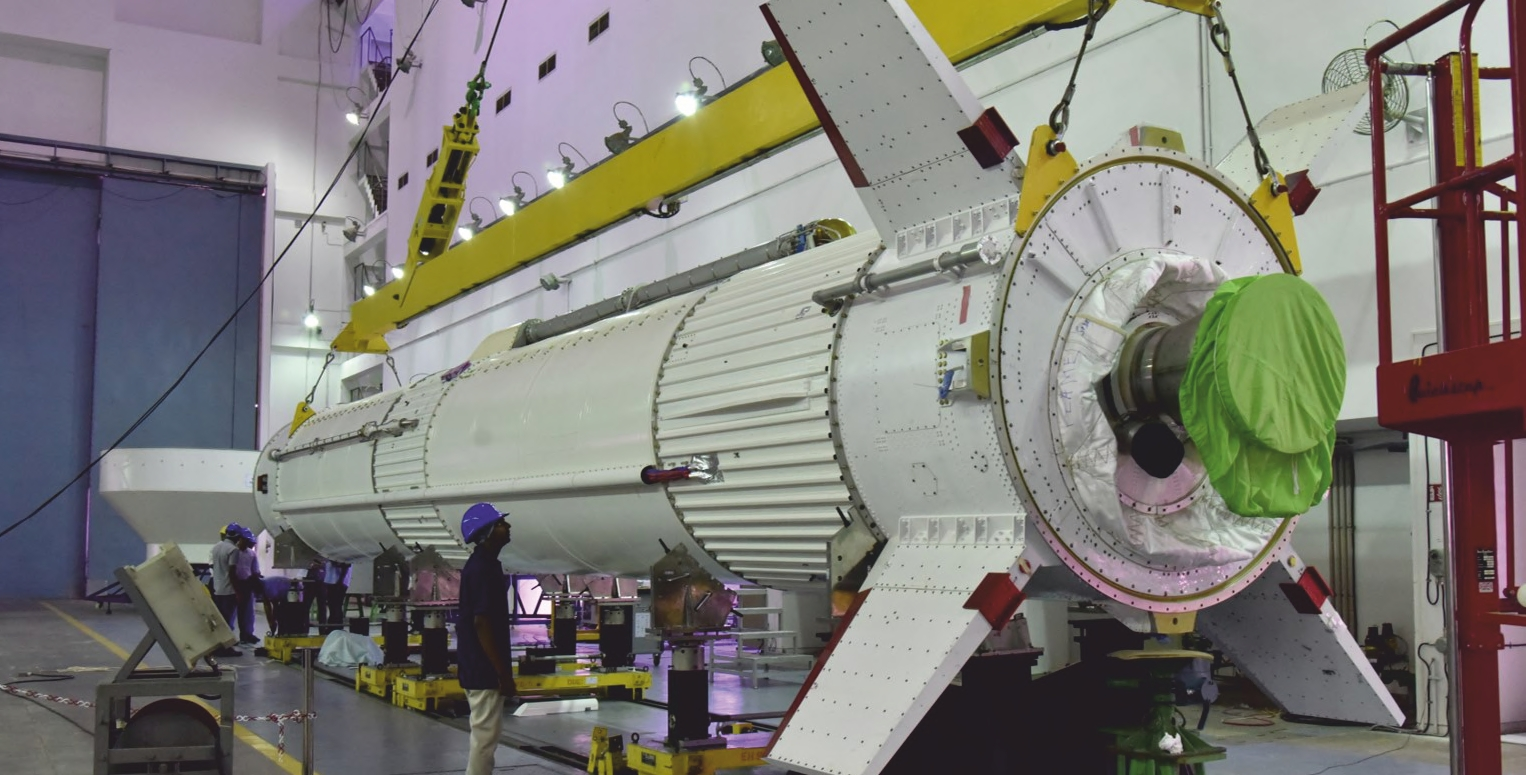
Gaganyaan Test Vehicle for TV-D1 abort test

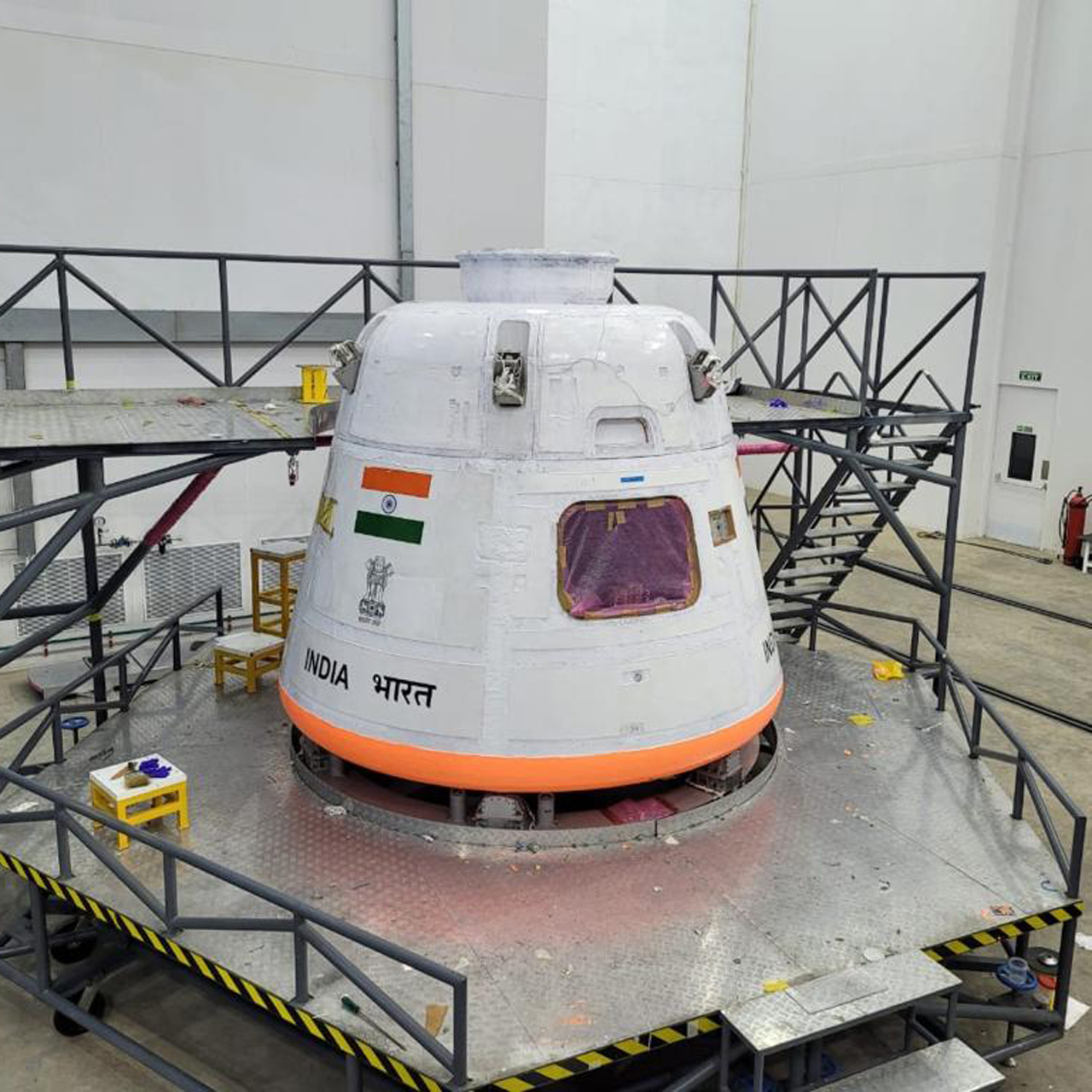
Gaganyaan TV-D1 test article

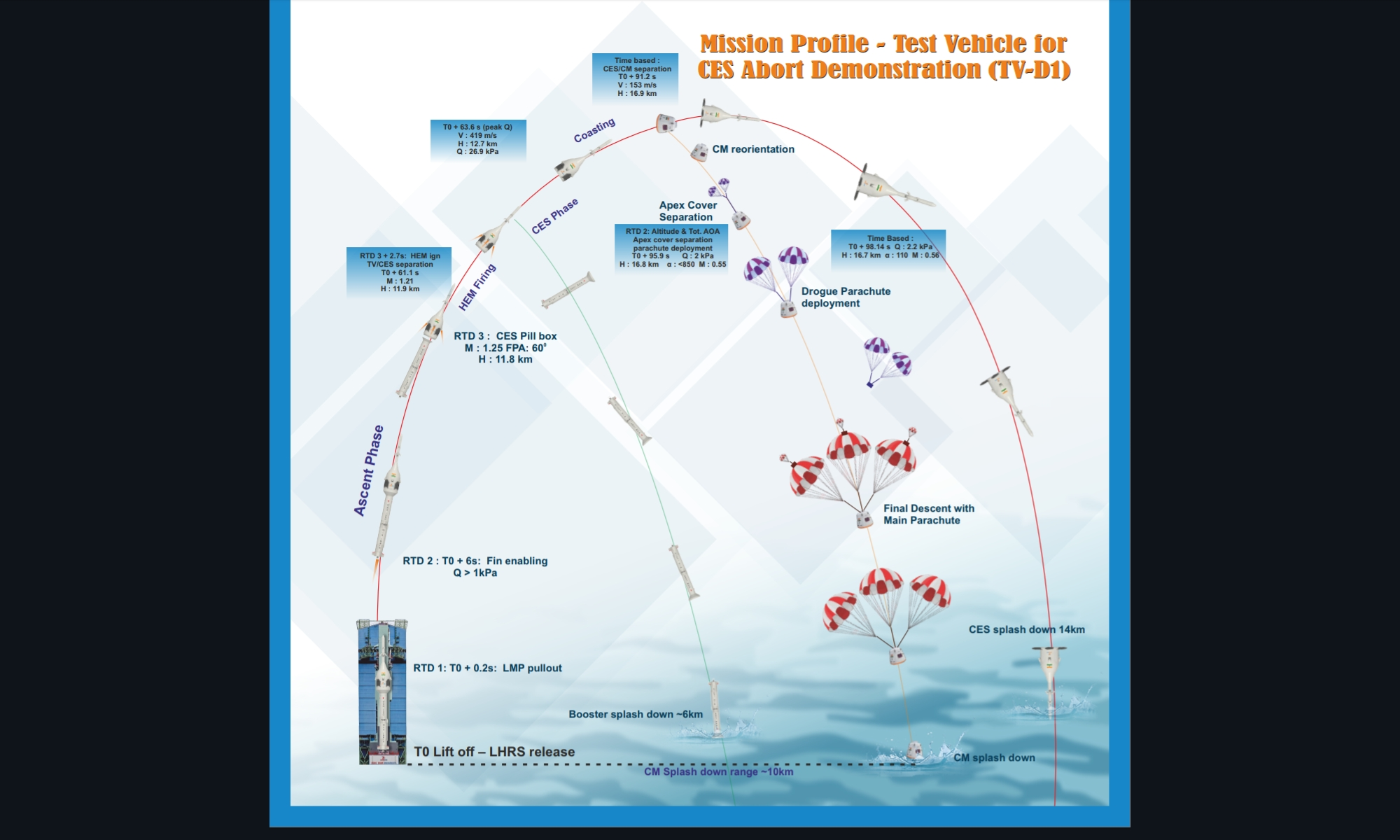
TV-D1 flight profile

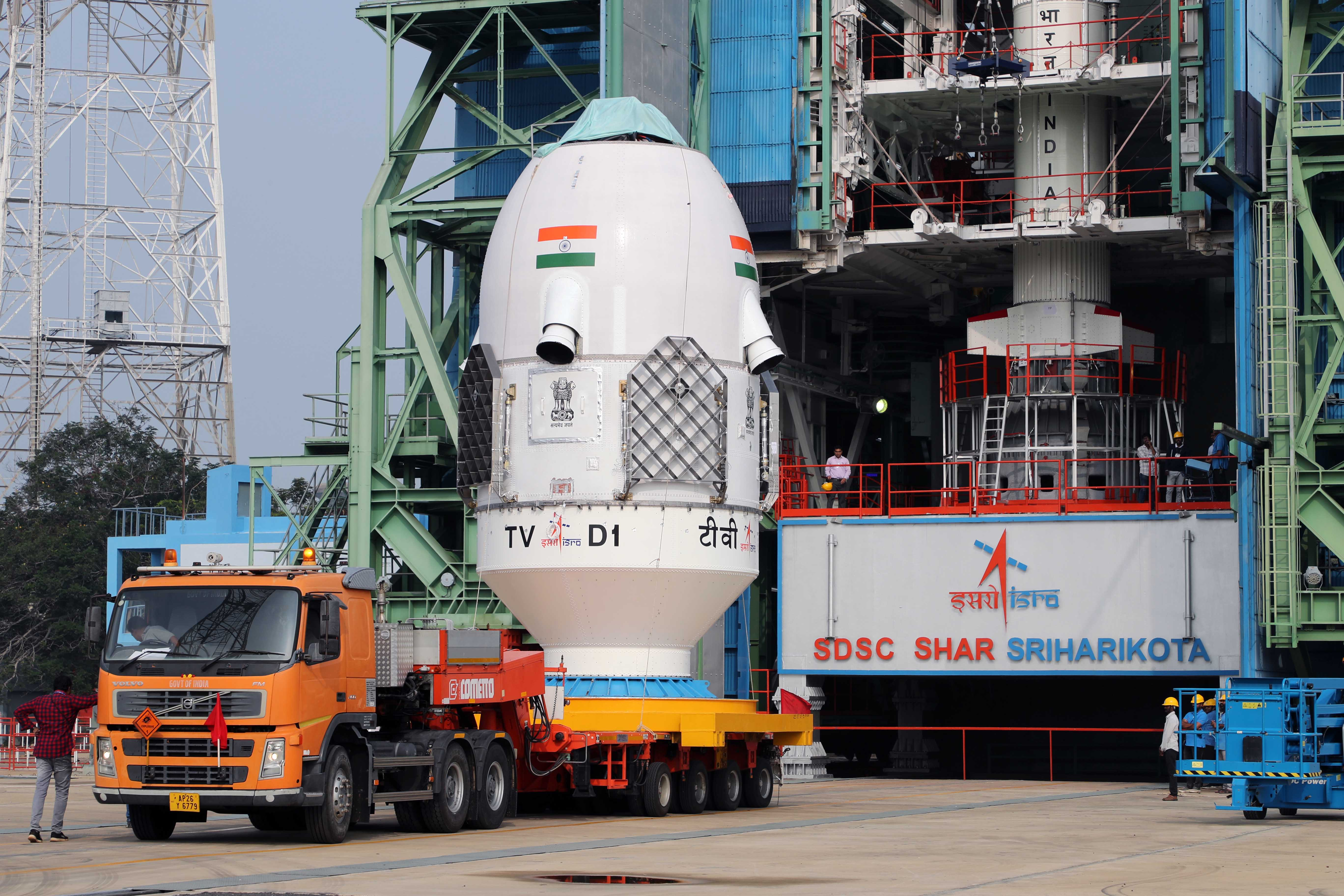
TV-D1 test article with aeroskirt housing gridfins

TV-D1 integration

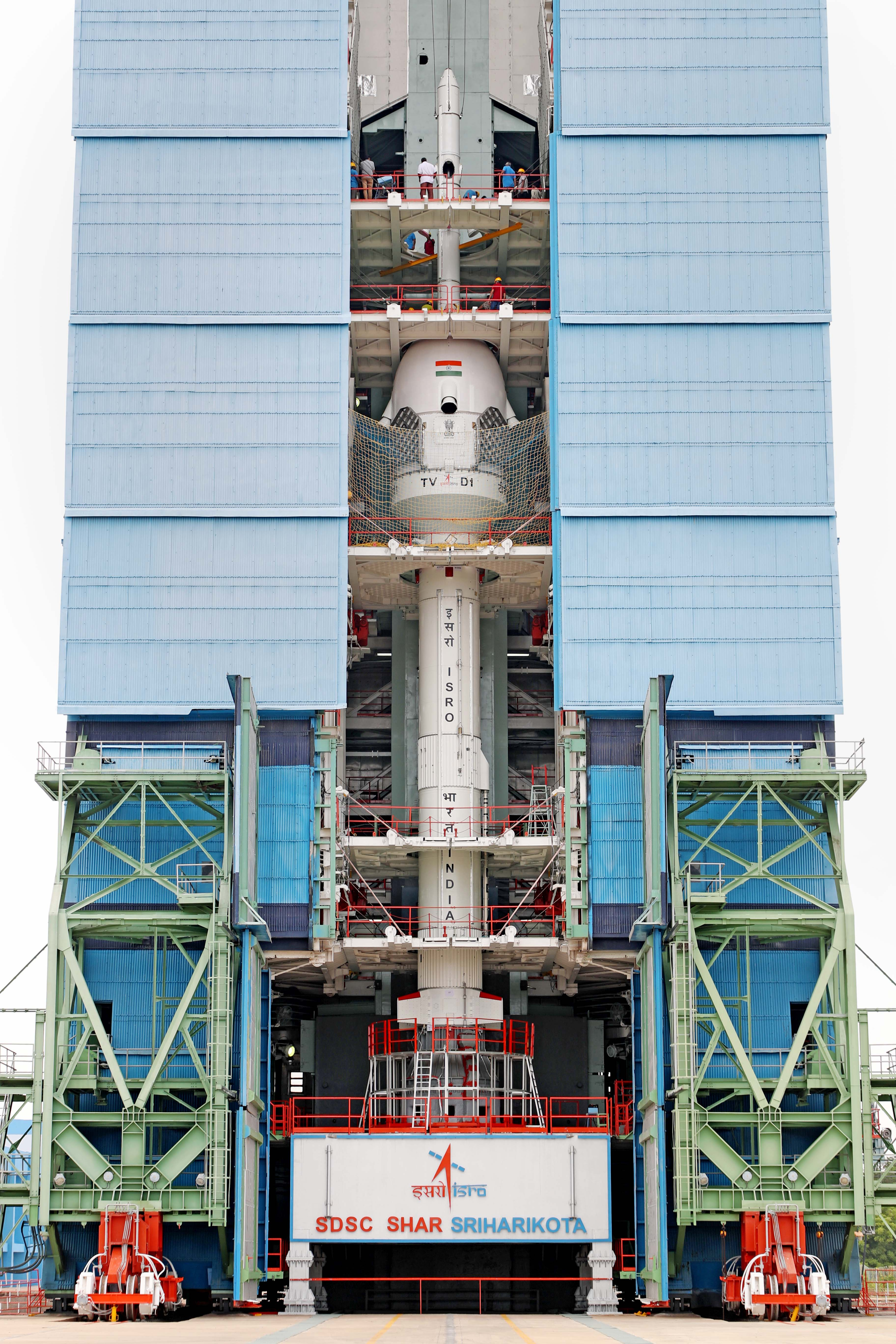
Stacking of TV-D1

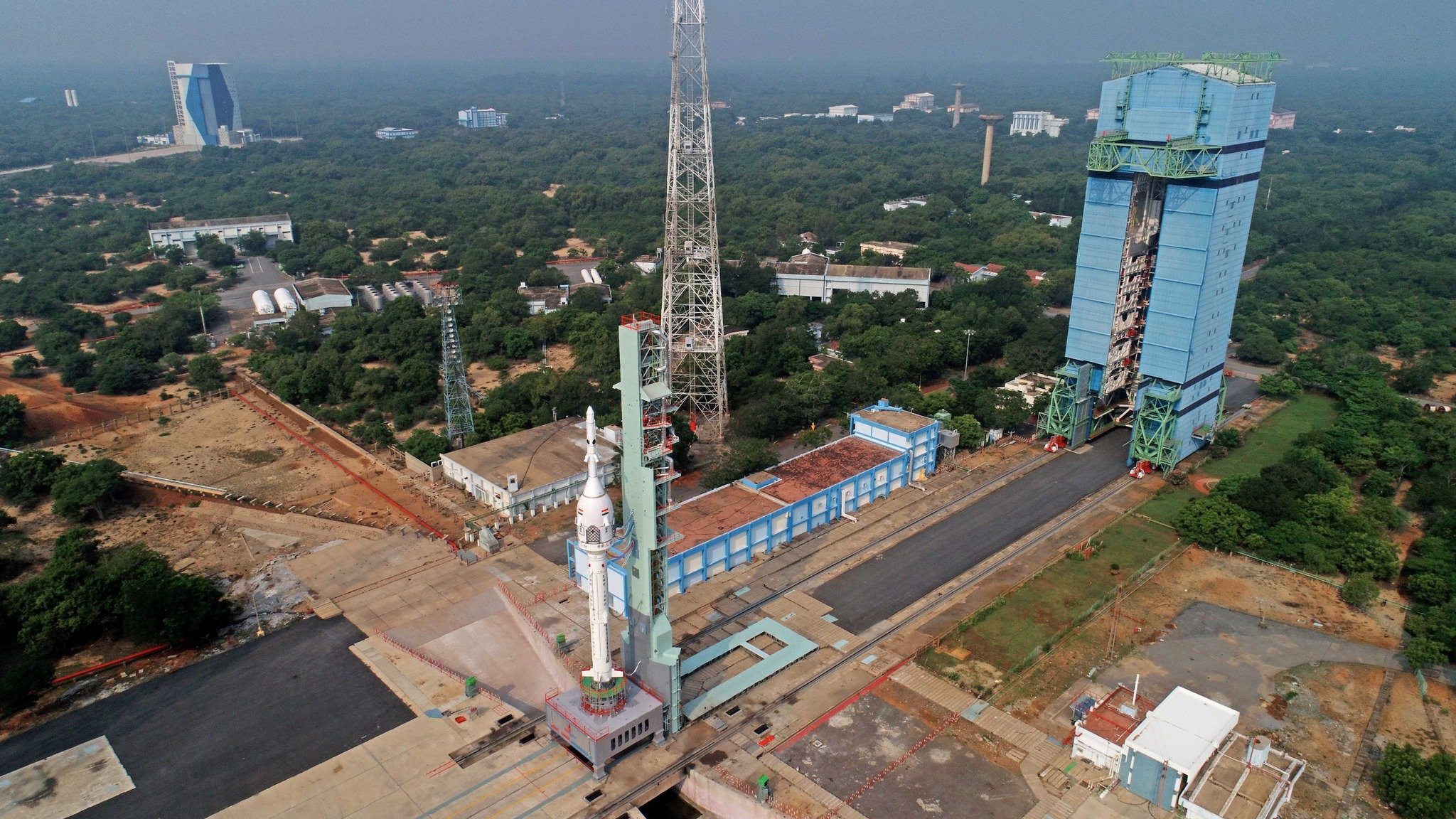
TV-D1 on pad

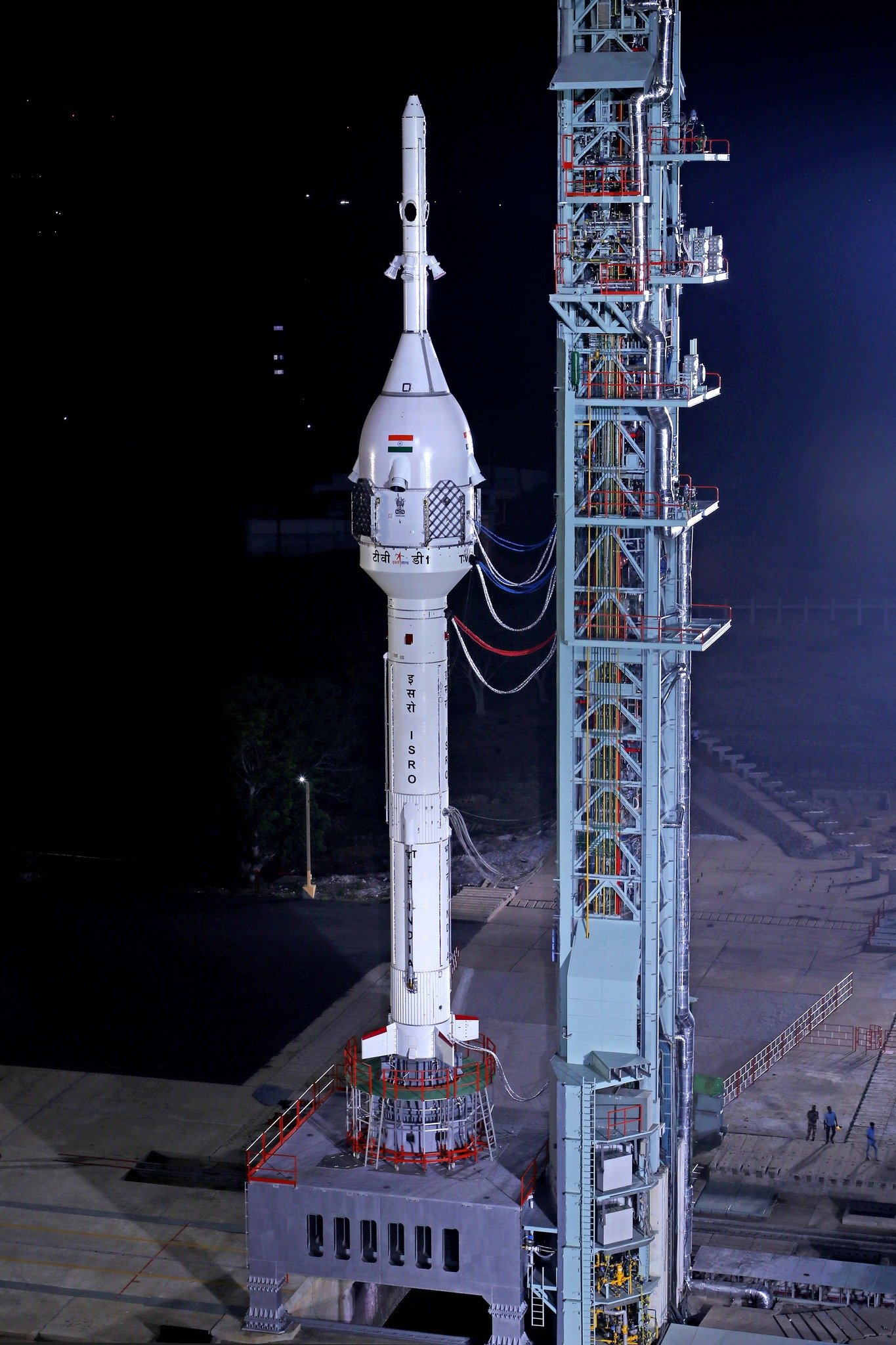
The Gaganyaan capsule, along with the escape booster on the launchpad

TV-D1 launch slow-mo

TV-D1 onboard video

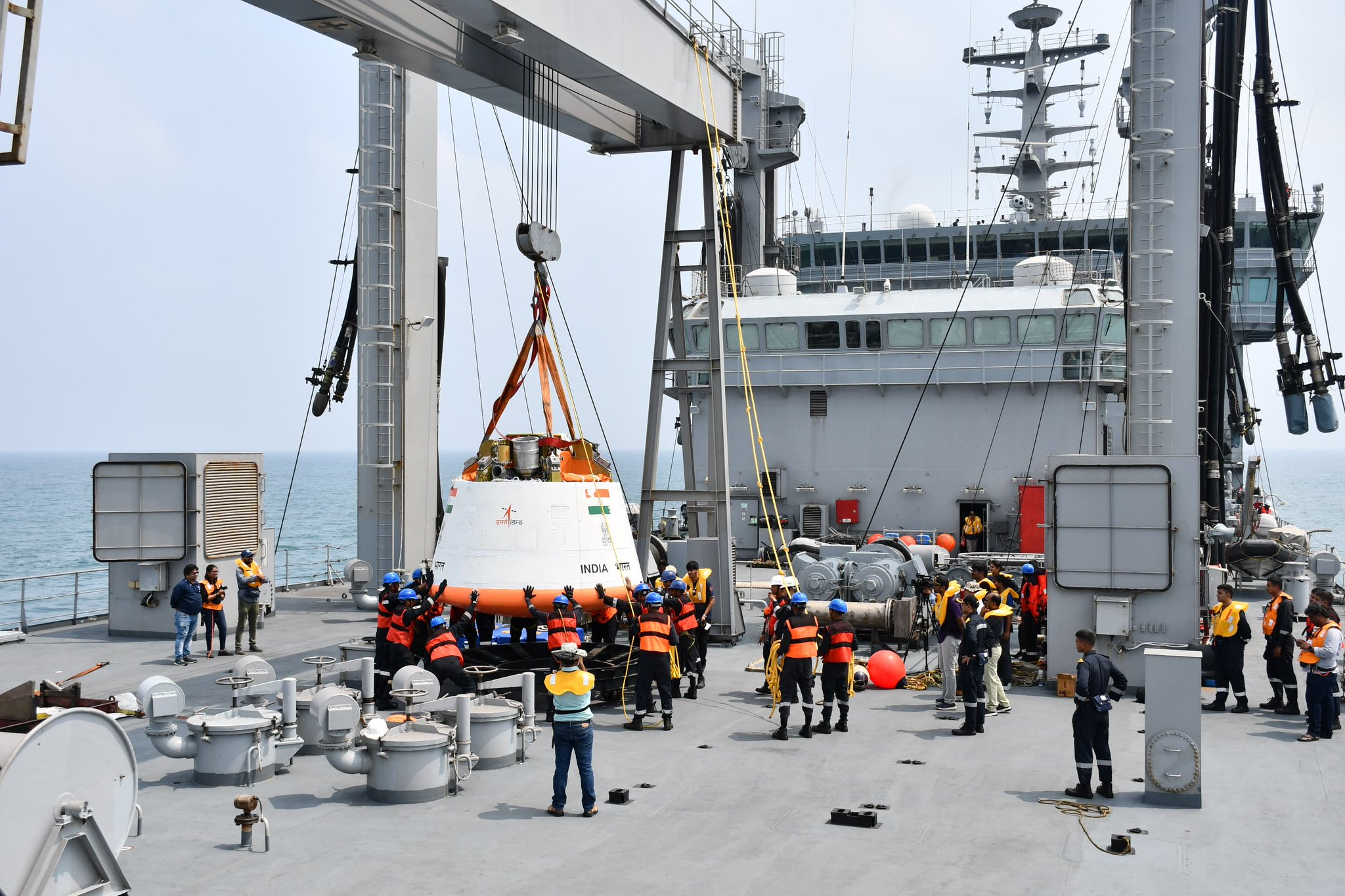
Gaganyaan TV-D1 capsule successfully secured on deck of INS Shakti (A57)

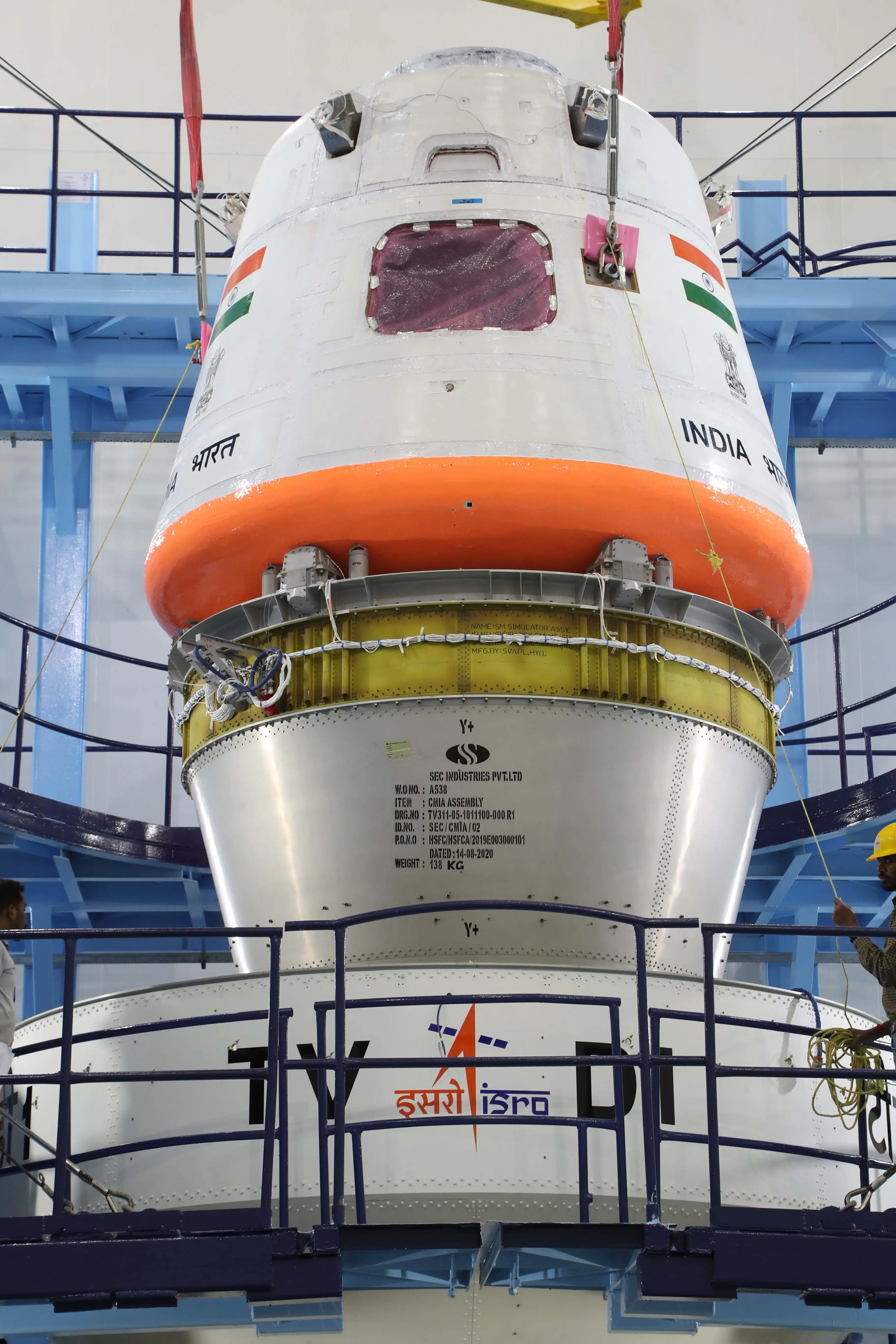

== See also ==
- Indian Human Spaceflight Programme
- Launch escape system

== Bibliography ==
- ANI (13 September 2022). "First trial for Gaganyaan to be done by end of 2023, or beginning of 2024: Jitendra Singh". Times of India. Archived from the original on 7 October 2022.
- Kumar, Chenthan (13 October 2022). "Gaganyaan: First abort test likely only in early 2023". Times of India. Archived from the original on 14 October 2022.
- Singh, Surendra (28 October 2022). "First test-flight of Gaganyaan mission in February: Isro official". Times of India. Archived from the original on 31 October 2022.
- "Will conduct 6 test launches before manned mission, building some Gaganyaan systems in-house to cut cost: Isro chief". Times of India. 5 January 2023. Archived from the original on 5 January 2023.
- Kumar, Chethan (25 February 2023). "Gaganyaan: First abort test moves a step closer; Isro receives simulated crew module structure assembly". Times of India. Archived from the original on 20 March 2023.
- Kumar, Chethan (23 June 2023). "'Isro to test Gaganyaan escape system in August'". Times of India. Archived from the original on 25 June 2023.
