= GBU-28 =

American laser-guided bunker busting bomb

Guided Bomb Unit‐28 (GBU‐28)
- Type: Laser-guided bunker busting bomb
- Place of origin: United States

Service history
- In service: 1991–present
- Used by: United States; Israel; South Korea
- Wars: Gulf War; Gaza war; Israel–Hezbollah conflict (2023–2024); 2024 Hezbollah headquarters strike; 2026 Iran war

Production history
- Designer: Albert L. Weimorts
- Manufacturer: Raytheon; General Dynamics Ordnance and Tactical Systems

Specifications
- Mass: 4,000–5,000 lb (1,800–2,300 kg)
- Length: 19 ft 1.3 in (5.824 m) overall; 13 ft 3 in (4.04 m) bomb body
- Diameter: 15 in (382 mm) main body; 16 in (407 mm) widest point
- Filling: Tritonal, AFX‐757 IM
- Filling weight: 675 lb (306.2 kg)
- Detonation mechanism: Impact, time delay
- References: Janes

The GBU-28 (Guided Bomb Unit‐28) is a 4,000–5,000-pound (1,800–2,300 kg) class laser-guided "bunker busting" bomb produced originally by the Watervliet Arsenal, Watervliet, New York. It was designed, manufactured, and deployed in less than three weeks due to an urgent need during Operation Desert Storm to penetrate hardened Iraqi command centers located deep underground. Only two of the weapons were dropped in Desert Storm, both by F-111Fs. One GBU-28 was dropped during Operation Iraqi Freedom. It was designed by Albert L. Weimorts.

The Enhanced GBU-28 augments the laser-guidance with inertial navigation and GPS guidance systems.

== Design and development ==
In August 1990, the U.S. military began planning an air offensive campaign against Iraq. Planners noticed that a few command and control bunkers in Baghdad were located deep underground to withstand heavy fire. Doubts were raised about the ability of the BLU-109/B to penetrate such fortified structures, so the US Air Force Air Armament Division at Eglin Air Force Base, Florida, was asked to create a weapon that could, and engineer Al Weimorts sketched improved BLU-109 variants. By January 1991, as the Persian Gulf War was well underway, it was determined that the BLU-109/B-equipped laser-guided bombs (LGB) would be unable to penetrate fortified bunkers deep underground.

The initial batch of GBU-28s was built from modified 8-inch (203 mm) artillery barrels (principally from deactivated M110 howitzers), but later examples are purpose-built with the BLU-113 bomb body made by National Forge of Irvine, Pennsylvania. They weigh 5,000 pounds (2,268 kg) and contain 630 pounds (286 kg) of tritonal explosive.

The GBU-28 C/B version uses the 5,000-pound BLU-122 bomb body, which contains AFX-757 explosive in a 4,000-pound (1,800 kg) casing machined from a single piece of ES-1 Eglin steel alloy.

The operator illuminates a target with a laser designator and the munition guides itself to the spot of laser light reflected from the target. When the GBU-28 hits the ground, a short-delay time fuze is activated which triggers detonation when it has penetrated deeply enough to completely destroy the target.

The bomb underwent testing at the Tonopah Test Range, Nevada, a test facility for United States Department of Energy funded weapon programs. An F-111F of the 431st Test and Evaluation Squadron based at McClellan AFB in California dropped the first GBU-28 at Tonopah on February 24, 1991. It proved capable of penetrating over 160 feet (50 m) of earth or 16 feet (5 m) of solid concrete; this was demonstrated when a test bomb, bolted to a missile sled, smashed through 22 feet (6.7 m) of reinforced concrete and still retained enough kinetic energy to travel a half-mile (800 m) downrange. The GBU-28 went from finalized design to first use in combat in only two weeks between 13 and 27 February 1991.

== Operational history ==
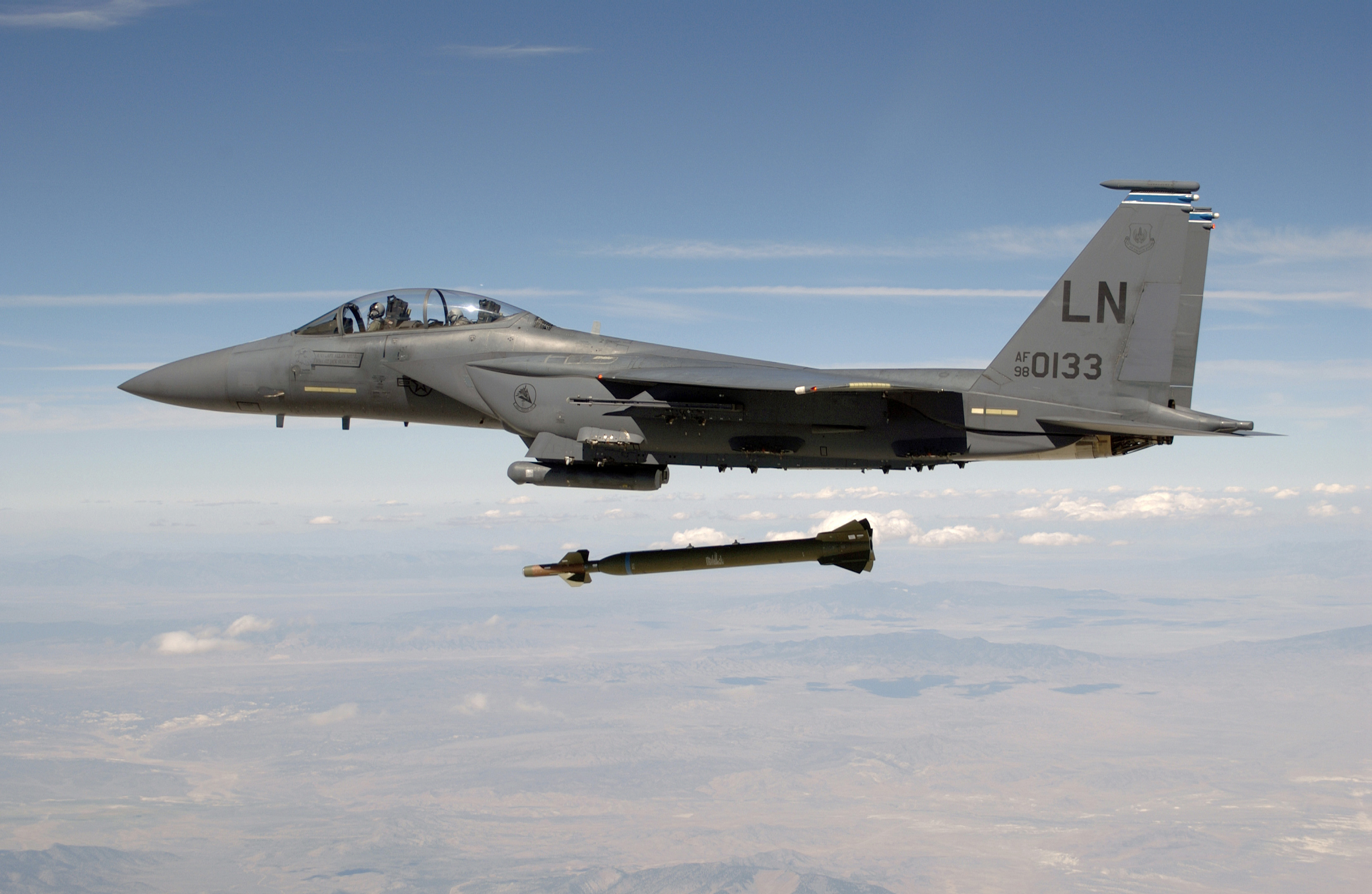
An F-15E of the 492d FS, 48th FW, releasing a GBU-28.

On the night of 27/28 February 1991, just hours before the ceasefire, two General Dynamics F-111Fs, loaded with one GBU-28 each, headed towards a target on the outskirts of Baghdad. The al-Taji Airbase, located 15 miles (24 km) northwest of the Iraqi capital, had been hit at least three times by GBU-27/Bs from F-117 Nighthawks, "digging up the rose garden". The first GBU-28 was dropped off-target due to target misidentification. The second GBU-28 was a direct hit and penetrated the thick reinforced concrete before detonating, killing everyone inside.

The bomb was used during the NATO bombing of Yugoslavia in 1999 by USAF F-15Es, notably against the Straževica command center in Belgrade, but without success.

The bomb was used during Operations Enduring Freedom in 2002 and Invasion of Iraq in 2003 by USAF F-15Es.

The first foreign sale of the GBU-28 was the acquisition of 100 units by Israel, authorized in April 2005. Delivery of the weapons was accelerated at the request of Israel in July 2006. Delivery was described as "upcoming" in a cable dated November 2009 which suggested that the weapon could be used against Iran's nuclear facilities. Fifty-five GBU-28s were delivered to Israel in 2009. There were unconfirmed reports that Israel used the GBU-28 during the 2008–2009 Gaza War.

In June 2009 United States agreed to sell the GBU-28s to South Korea, following the nuclear test conducted on 25 May 2009 by North Korea. The bombs were to be delivered between 2010 and 2014.

According to the Jerusalem Post on 23 December 2011 the US Justice Department announced that it had reached a settlement with Kaman Corp. which allegedly substituted a fuze in four lots of fuzes made for the bombs. Under the settlement, Kaman Corp. will pay the government $4.75 million. Israel raised concerns, it had also received GBU-28 bombs fuzed to prematurely detonate before penetration or at other times. In bombardment of Gaza in May 2021, referred to by the Israeli military as the Guardian of the Walls operation, the GBU-28 was used extensively.

In October 2021, the USAF completed assessments of the GBU-72 Advanced 5K Penetrator (A5K), a 5,000 lb (2,300 kg) penetrator bomb consisting of a BLU-138 penetrator warhead combined with a JDAM GPS guidance kit. In development since 2017, the GBU-72 is expected to cause significantly more damage against hardened, buried targets and is fitted with a more durable and efficient smart electronic fuse that can activate at a preprogrammed location. The Air Force plans to begin buying the weapon in 2022 to replace the GBU-28. Israel is also reportedly interested.

== See also ==
- GBU-72
