= Albert L. Weimorts Jr. =

American engineer and designer of conventional bombs

- Born: Albert Lee Weimorts Jr. 6 March 1938
- Died: 21 December 2005 (aged 67); Fort Walton Beach, Florida, U.S.
- Education: Mississippi State University
- Occupation: Engineer
- Known for: Inventing the GBU-43/B MOAB and the GBU-28

Albert Lee Weimorts Jr. (6 March 1938 – 21 December 2005) was an American engineer who was known for his design of some of the most powerful conventional bombs for the United States Armed Forces. Notably, he created the GBU-43, or "mother of all bombs", which is the largest non-nuclear bomb in the inventory of the US Armed Forces, and earlier conceived of the GBU-28, both for use in wars in the Middle East.

Weimorts died of brain cancer in 2005, before the first operational use of the MOAB, which occurred in 2017 in Afghanistan.
