= GBU-43/B MOAB =

American large-yield bomb

GBU-43/B Massive Ordnance Air Blast (MOAB)
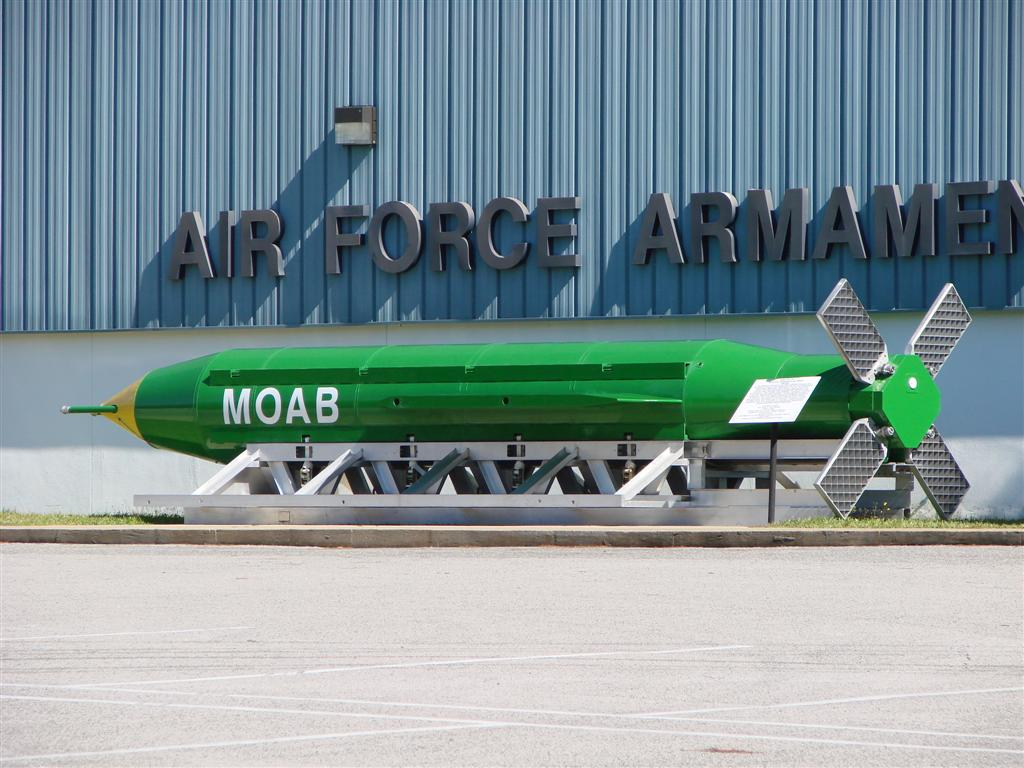
- GBU-43/B on display at the Air Force Armament Museum, Eglin Air Force Base, Florida. Note the grid fins.
- Place of origin: United States

Service history
- In service: 2003–present
- Used by: United States Air Force
- Wars: War in Afghanistan

Production history
- Designer: Albert L. Weimorts
- Designed: 2002
- Manufacturer: McAlester Army Ammunition Plant
- Produced: 2003
- No. built: 15

Specifications
- Mass: 21,715 lb (9,850 kg)
- Length: 30 ft 1.75 in (9.1885 m)
- Diameter: 40.5 in (103 cm)
- Filling: H-6
- Filling weight: 18,739 lb (8,500 kg)
- Blast yield: 11 tons TNT (46 GJ)

The GBU-43/B Massive Ordnance Air Blast (MOAB, /ˈmoʊ.æb/, colloquially given as the Mother of All Bombs) is a large-yield bomb, developed for the United States military by Albert L. Weimorts, Jr. of the Air Force Research Laboratory. It was first tested in 2003. At the time of development, it was said to be the most powerful non-nuclear weapon in the US military arsenal. The bomb is designed to be delivered by a C-130 Hercules, primarily the MC-130E Combat Talon I or MC-130H Combat Talon II variants. The bomb's name and nickname were inspired by Iraqi president Saddam Hussein's invocation of the "mother of all battles" (Umm al-Ma'arik) during the 1991 Gulf War.

The MOAB was first deployed in combat on the 13 April 2017 airstrike against an Islamic State – Khorasan Province tunnel complex in Achin District, Afghanistan.

== Design and development ==
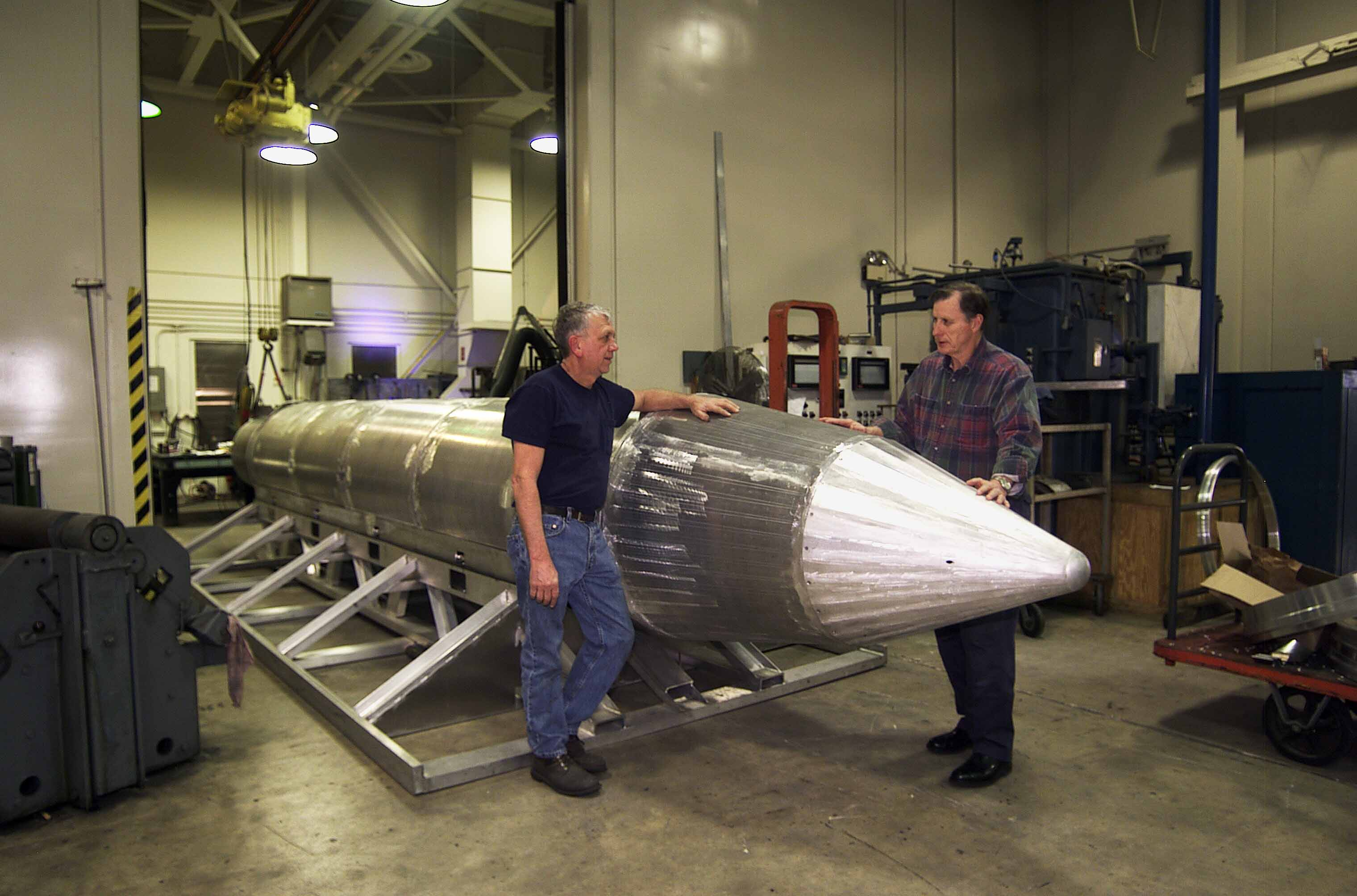
Al Weimorts (right), creator of the GBU-43/B MOAB, and Joseph Fellenz, lead model maker, look over the still unpainted prototype.

2003 test of the MOAB

The basic principle resembles that of the BLU-82 Daisy Cutter, which was used to clear heavily wooded areas in the Vietnam War. Decades later, the BLU-82 was used in Afghanistan in November 2001 against the Taliban. Its success as a weapon of intimidation led to the decision to develop the MOAB. Pentagon officials suggested MOAB might be used as an anti-personnel weapon, as part of the "shock and awe" strategy integral to the 2003 invasion of Iraq.

A GBU-43 is delivered from a C-130 cargo aircraft, inside which it is carried on a cradle resting on an airdrop platform. The bomb is dropped by deploying drogue parachutes, which also extract the cradle and platform from the aircraft. Shortly after launch, drogues are released and the bomb falls without the use of a retarding parachute. GPS satellite-guidance is used to guide the bomb to their target.

The MOAB is not a penetrator weapon and is primarily an air burst bomb intended for soft to medium surface targets covering extended areas and targets in a contained environment such as a deep canyon or within a cave system. High altitude carpet-bombing with much smaller 500-to-2,000-pound (230 to 910 kg) bombs delivered via heavy bombers, such as the B-52, B-2, or the B-1B, is also highly effective at covering large areas.

The MOAB is designed to be used against a specific target, and cannot by itself replicate the effects of a typical heavy bomber mission. During the Vietnam War's Operation Arc Light program, for example, the United States Air Force sent B-52s on well over 10,000 bombing raids, each usually carried out by two groups of three aircraft. A typical mission dropped 168 tons of ordnance, dropping the bombs over an area 1.5 by 0.5 miles (2,400 by 800 m) with an explosive force equivalent to 10 to 17 MOABs.

The MOAB was first tested with the explosive tritonal on 11 March 2003, on Range 70 located at Eglin Air Force Base in Florida. It was tested again on 21 November 2003.

Since 2003, 15 MOABs have been manufactured at the McAlester Army Ammunition Plant in McAlester, Oklahoma.

The Air Force has said the MOAB has a unit price of $170,000, but this is a historical unit cost made in the mid-2000s and various factors of the bomb's atypical development process have made exact cost estimation difficult. The Air Force Research Lab generated the value based on already existing parts such as bomb casing and metals, and since the bomb was built in-house, they did not pay for outside research or have standard procurement costs associated with it. MOAB was a "crash project" developed for use against an adversary with uncertain tactics on unfamiliar terrain, and so was an effort to meet an urgent need rather than a formal program. Should more bombs be ordered to be built, manufacturing would likely be started over with higher costs due to a lack of old parts, price inflation, and new design and testing.

== Operational use ==
Video showing the bomb in use in April 2017

On 13 April 2017, a MOAB was dropped on a cave complex operated by Islamic State – Khorasan Province (ISKP) in Nangarhar Province, Afghanistan. It was the first operational use of the bomb. Two days later, an Afghan army spokesman said that the strike killed 94 ISKP militants, including four commanders, with no signs of civilian casualties. However, an Afghan parliamentarian from Nangarhar province, Esmatullah Shinwari, said locals told him the explosion killed a teacher and his young son. Former US military official Marc Garlasco, who served in the George W. Bush administration, said that the US had not previously used the MOAB because of worries that it would inadvertently hurt or kill civilians. ISIS denied that any of its fighters were killed or injured.

== Similar weapons ==
During World War II, Royal Air Force Bomber Command used the Grand Slam, officially known as the "Bomb, Medium Capacity, 22,000 lb" 42 times. At 22,000 lb (10 t) total weight, these earthquake bombs were larger and heavier than the MOAB. However, half their weight was due to the cast high tensile steel casing necessary for penetrating the ground – up to 130 ft (40 m) – before exploding. The MOAB, in contrast, has a light 2,900 lb (1.3 t) aluminum casing surrounding 18,700 lb (8.5 t) of explosive Composition H-6 material.

The United States Air Force's T-12 Cloudmaker 44,000-pound (20 t) demolition bomb (similar in design to the Grand Slam), developed after World War II, carried a heavier explosive charge than the MOAB, but was never used in combat.

In 2007, the Russian military announced that they had tested a thermobaric weapon nicknamed the "Father of All Bombs" ("FOAB"). The weapon is claimed to have a blast yield equivalent to 44 tonnes of TNT (180 GJ), quadruple that of the American MOAB, but its specifications are disputed.

The MOAB is the most powerful conventional bomb ever used in combat as measured by the weight of its explosive material. The explosive yield is comparable to that of the smallest tactical nuclear weapons, such as the Cold War–era American M-388 projectile fired by the portable Davy Crockett recoilless gun. The M-388, a W54 nuclear warhead variant, weighed less than 60 pounds (27 kg).

== See also ==
- Earthquake bomb
- GBU-57A/B MOP, another very large current US bomb
