= GBU-72 =

American precision-guided bunker buster bomb

Guided Bomb Unit‐72 (GBU‐72)
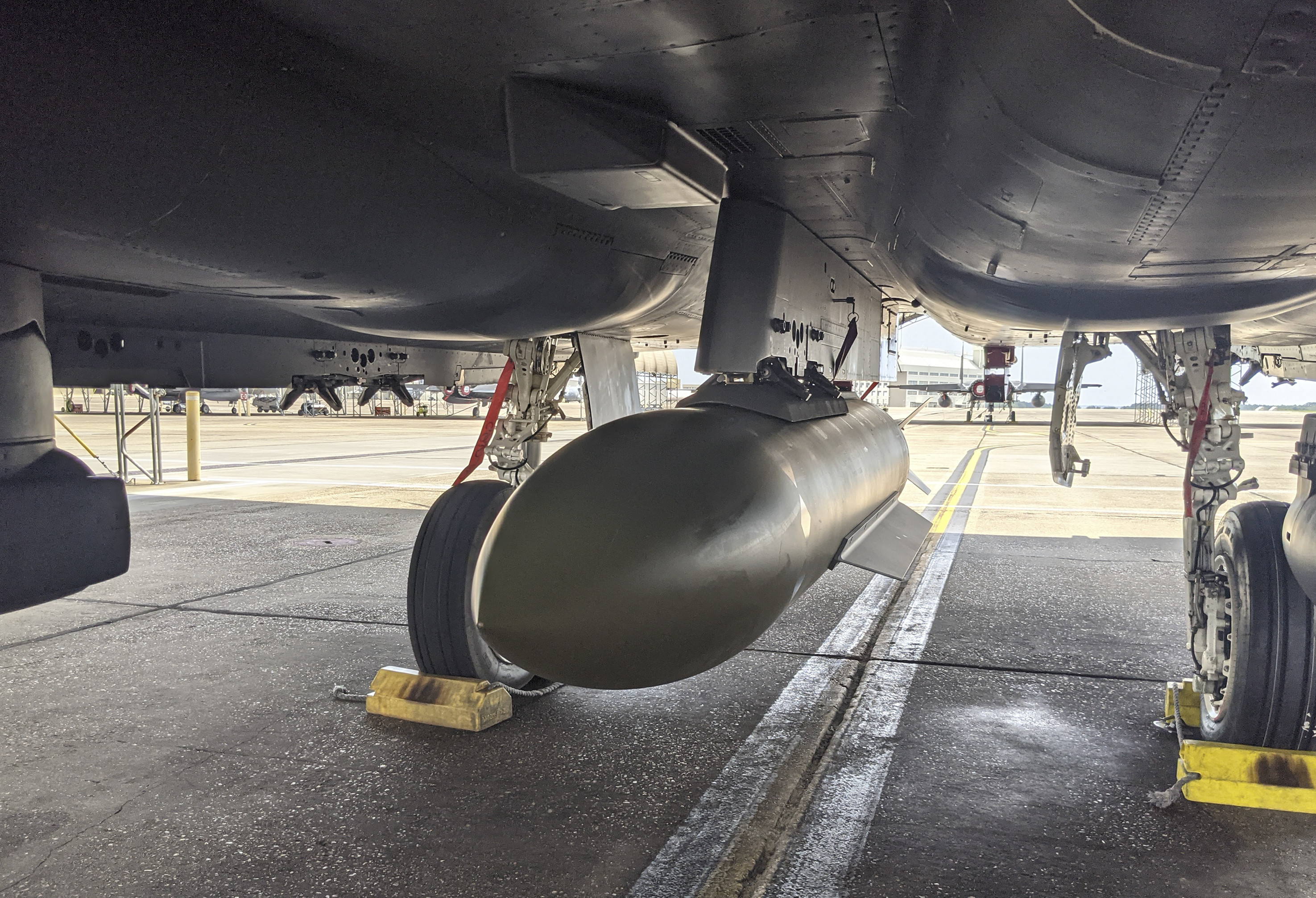
- A GBU-72B mounted on an aircraft at Eglin Air Force Base
- Type: Precision-guided bunker busting bomb
- Place of origin: United States

Service history
- In service: Since 2021
- Used by: United States Air Force
- Wars: Red Sea crisis; 2026 Iran war

Production history
- Designer: Boeing; Applied Research Associates

Specifications
- Mass: 5,000 lb (2,300 kg)
- Length: 15 ft 1 in (4.6 m) est.
- Diameter: 22 in (570 mm) est.
- Guidance system: GPS and INS
- Steering system: GBU-31/B JDAM tail kit
- Launch platform: B-1B, F-15E & F-15I
- References: Janes & The Telegraph

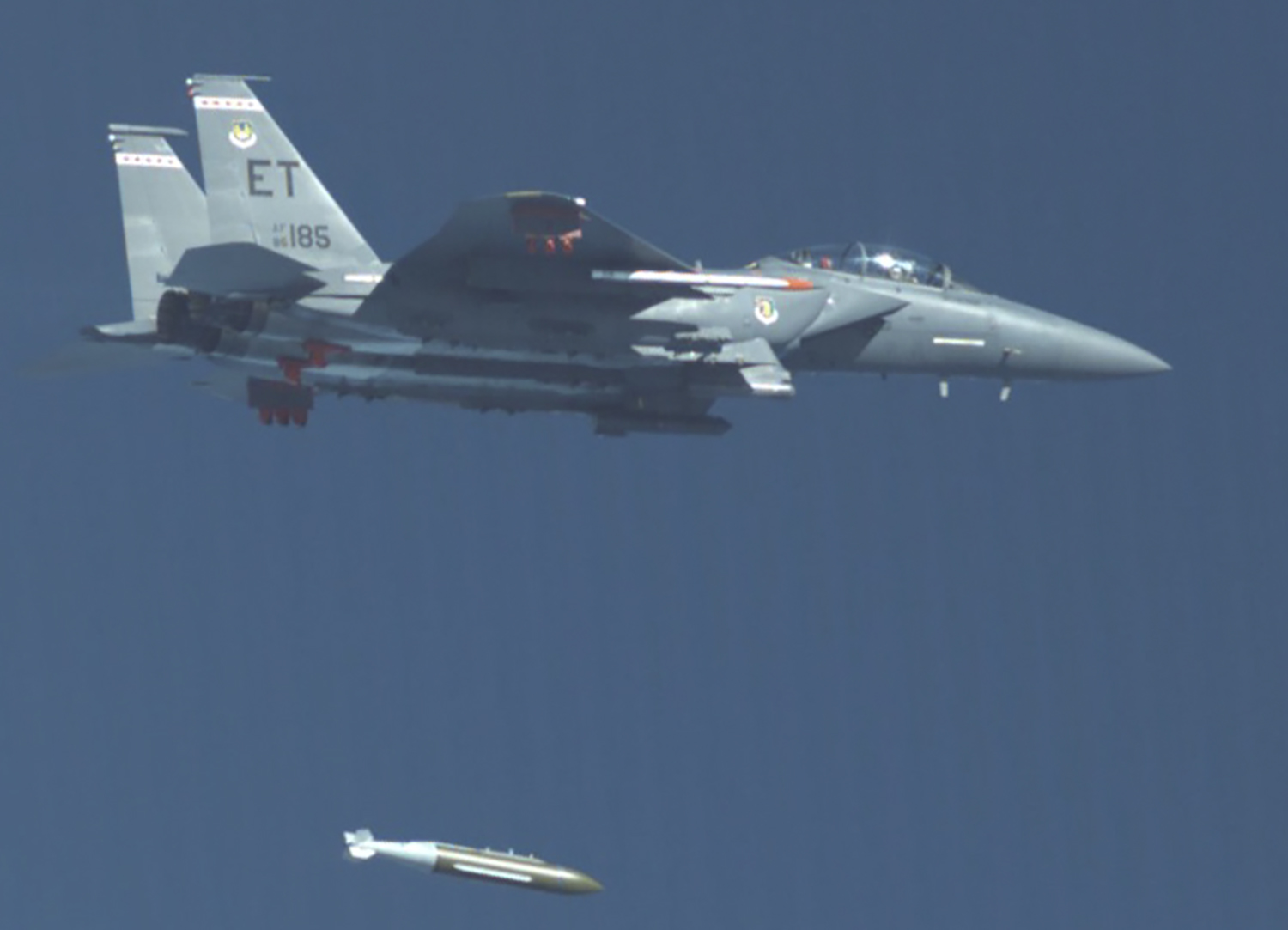
GBU-72/B Advanced 5K Penetrator being released by an F-15E Strike Eagle during a test by 96th Test Wing.

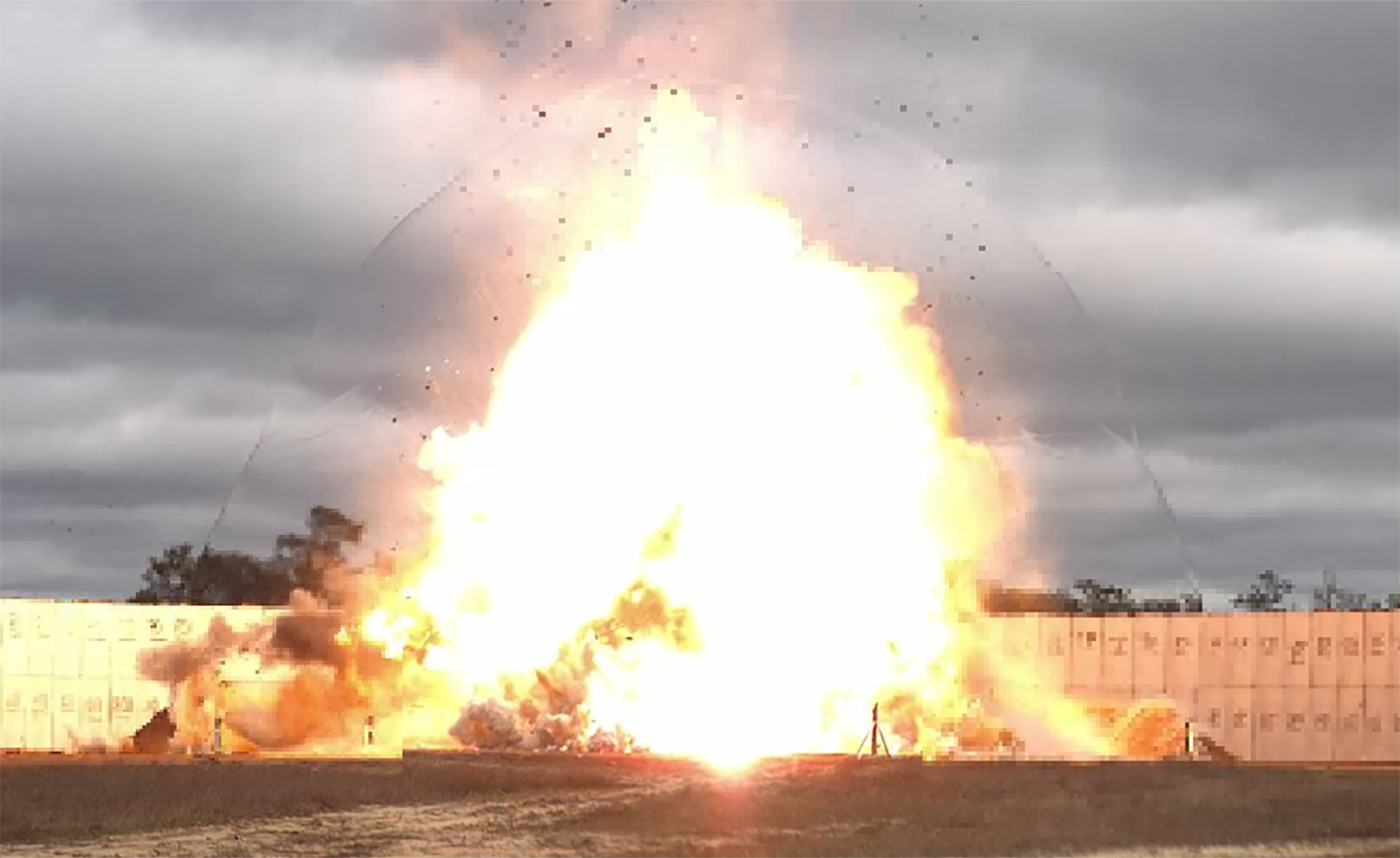
Blast of a GBU-72/B Advanced 5K Penetrator during a test by 96th Test Wing.

The Guided Bomb Unit‐72 (GBU‐72), also known as the Advanced 5K (A5K) Penetrator, is a bunker busting bomb developed in the United States.

== Description ==
The GBU-72 is a 5,000 lb (2,300 kg) class precision-guided bunker-busting bomb which uses a JDAM guidance kit.

The GBU-72 resembles an enlarged GBU-31/B JDAM fitted with a bunker-busting BLU-109 or BLU-137/B warhead. It is fitted with the GBU-31/B JDAM’s GPS and INS tail-mounted guidance kit and has long fins on either side of the bomb's underside.

No official data is available for how deep the GBU-72 can penetrate before exploding, although the weapon's program manager has been quoted as saying that its "lethality is expected to be substantially higher compared to similar legacy weapons like the GBU-28". The capabilities of the later versions of the GBU-28 remain classified, but the earliest versions could reportedly penetrate 150 ft (46 m) of earth and more than 15 ft (4.6 m) of reinforced concrete.

The GBU-72 can be dropped by the US Air Force's B-1Bs and F-15Es, and the Israeli Air Force's F-15Is.

== History ==
The evaluation of the GBU-72 at Eglin Air Force Base included ground-based tests such as detonating the bomb’s warhead inside barriers to measure its blast and other effects, and test flights planned by the 780th Test Squadron and carried out by the 40th Flight Test Squadron between July and October 2021 that included confirming "the weapon could safely release from the aircraft and validate a modified 2,000-pound joint-direct-attack-munition tail kit’s ability to control and navigate a 5,000-pound weapon."

The initial testing phase ended on 7 October 2021, when an 96th Test Wing McDonnell Douglas F-15E Strike Eagle released the GBU-72 (known as the GBU-72 Advanced 5K Penetrator) over the Eglin Air Force Base range. The program moved on to more JDAM integration test flights and developmental and operational testing in 2022.

In May 2024 it was reported that as part of joint American-British strikes during the Red Sea crisis, the US Air Force used a GBU-72 to destroy an underground Houthi facility in Yemen.

In September 2024 it was reported that the Israeli Air Force deployed up to ten GBU-72s on 27 September 2024 to kill Hezbollah's Secretary-General, Hassan Nasrallah, in his underground headquarters complex in Beirut. Subsequent reporting stated 2,000 lb (910 kg) class JDAM-equipped BLU-109 bunker-busting bombs were likely used.

In March 2026, multiple media outlets reported that the United States Air Force employed GBU-72/B in strikes against hardened Iranian anti-ship missile sites near the Strait of Hormuz during the Iran-war. United States Central Command confirmed the use of 5,000-pound class penetrator munitions in the operation, but did not specify the weapon system. Some reports described the strikes as the first combat use of the GBU-72/B, although earlier unconfirmed reports had suggested possible use in Yemen in 2024.

== See also ==
- GBU-28
- GBU-57A/B MOP
