= Grid fin =

Type of flight control surface

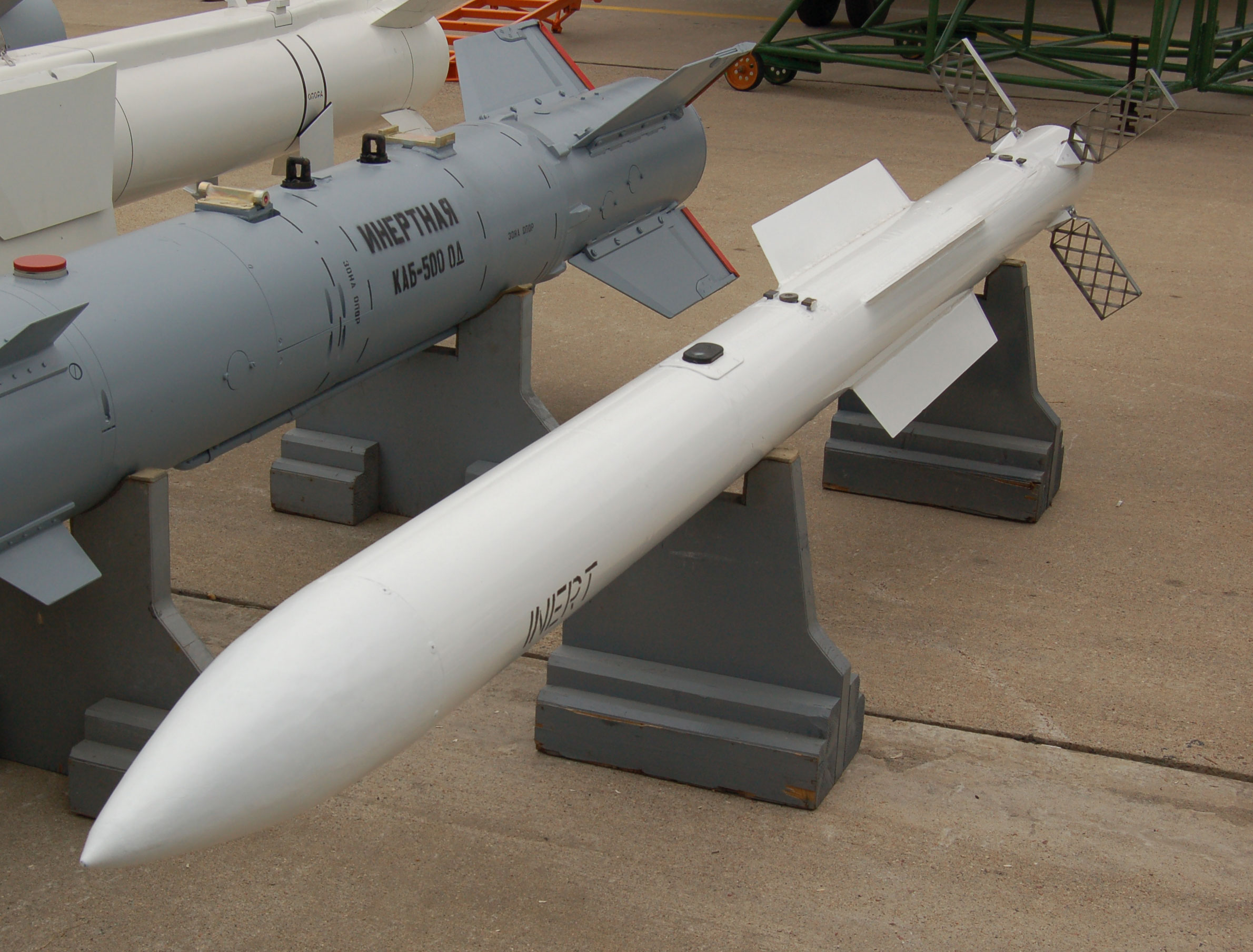
The Vympel NPO R-77 is a beyond-visual-range missile that uses grid fins. The gray KAB-500 OD guided bomb on the left of the image has conventional "planar" tail fins.

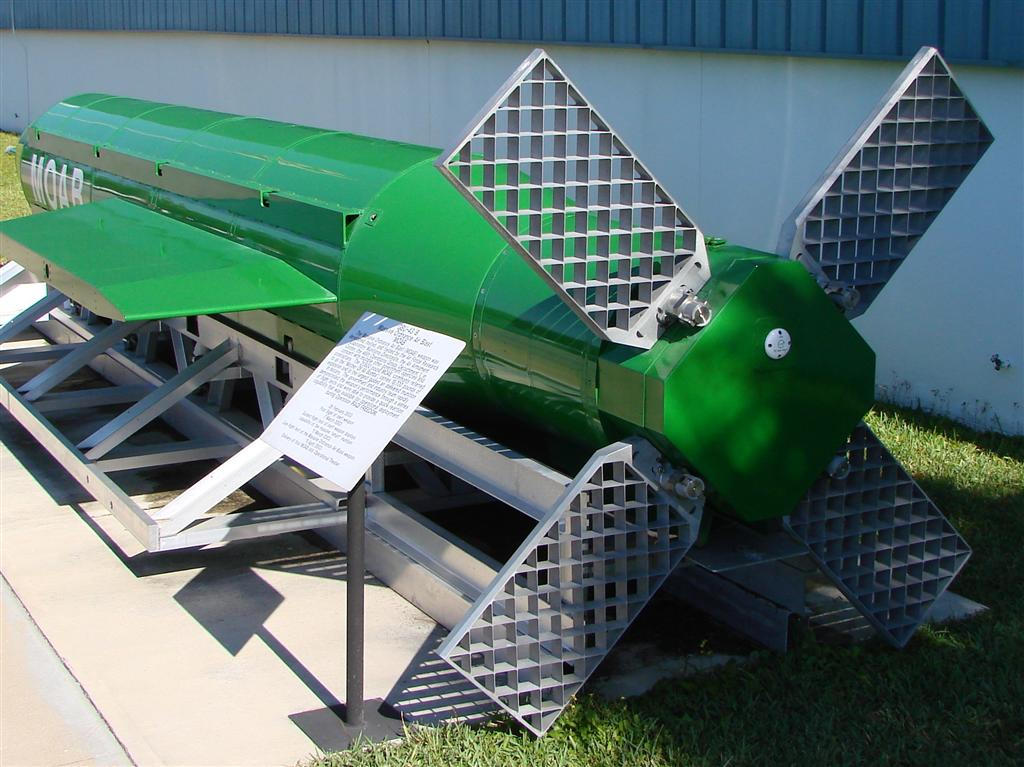
Closeup of MOAB grid fins

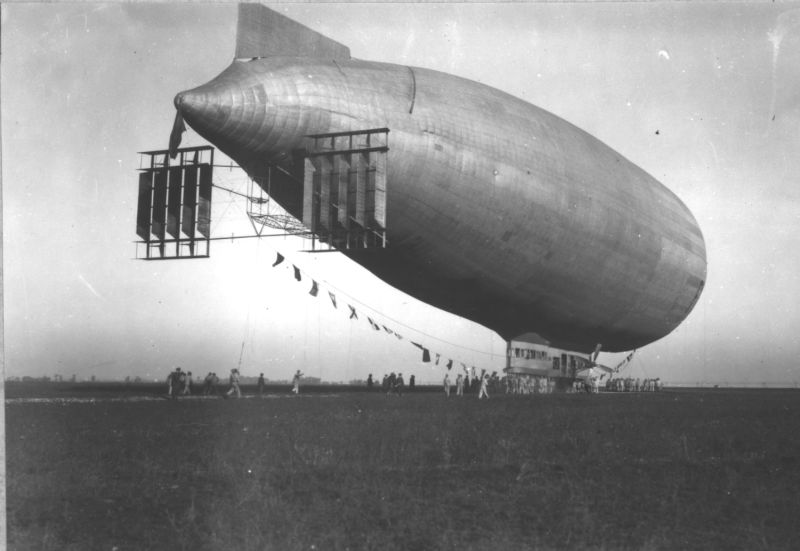
F6 Forlanini Airship grid fins

Grid fins (or lattice fins) are a type of flight control surface used on rockets and bombs, sometimes in place of more conventional control surfaces, such as planar fins. They were developed in the 1950s by a team led by Sergey Belotserkovskiy and used since the 1970s in various Soviet ballistic missile designs such as the SS-12 Scaleboard, SS-20 Saber, SS-21 Scarab, SS-23 Spider, and SS-25 Sickle, as well as the N-1 (the intended rocket for the Soviet moon program). In Russia, they are thus often referred to as Belotserkovskiy grid fins.

Grid fins have also been used on conventional missiles and bombs such as the Vympel R-77 air-to-air missile; the 3M-54 Klub (SS-N-27 Sizzler) family of cruise missiles; and the American Massive Ordnance Air Blast (MOAB) large-yield conventional bomb, and on specialized devices such as the Quick-MEDS delivery system and as part of the launch escape system for the Soyuz spacecraft.

In 2014, SpaceX tested grid fins on a first-stage demonstration test vehicle of its reusable Falcon 9 rocket, and on December 21, 2015 they were used during the high-velocity atmospheric portion of the reentry to help guide a commercial Falcon 9 first stage back to land for the first successful orbital booster landing in spaceflight history.

The 1st stage of the private Chinese company i-Space's Hyperbola-1 rocket appeared on July 25, 2019 to be equipped with steerable grid fins for attitude control.

On July 25, 2019, China launched a modified version of Long March 2C which featured grid fins atop the first stage for controlled re-entry of the spent rocket stage away from people in nearby towns and cities.

== Design characteristics ==
Conventional planar control fins are shaped like miniature wings. By contrast, grid fins are a lattice of smaller aerodynamic surfaces arranged within a box. Their appearance has sometimes led them to be compared to potato mashers or waffle irons.

Grid fins can be folded, pitched forward (or backwards), against the cylindrical body of a missile more directly and compactly than planar fins, allowing for more compact storage of the weapon; this is of importance where weapons are launched from a tube or for craft which store weapons in internal bays, such as stealth aircraft. Generally, the grid fins pitch forward/backward away from the body shortly after the missile has cleared the firing craft.

Grid fins have a much shorter chord (the distance between leading and trailing edge of the surface) than planar fins, as they are effectively a group of short fins mounted parallel to one another. Their reduced chord reduces the amount of torque exerted on the steering mechanism by high-speed airflow, allowing for the use of smaller fin actuators, and a smaller tail assembly overall.

Grid fins perform very well at subsonic and supersonic speeds, but poorly at transonic speeds; the flow causes a normal shockwave to form within the lattice, causing much of the airflow to pass completely around the fin instead of through it and generating significant wave drag. At high Mach numbers, grid fins flow fully supersonic and can provide lower drag and greater maneuverability than planar fins.

== Application in reusable launch vehicles ==
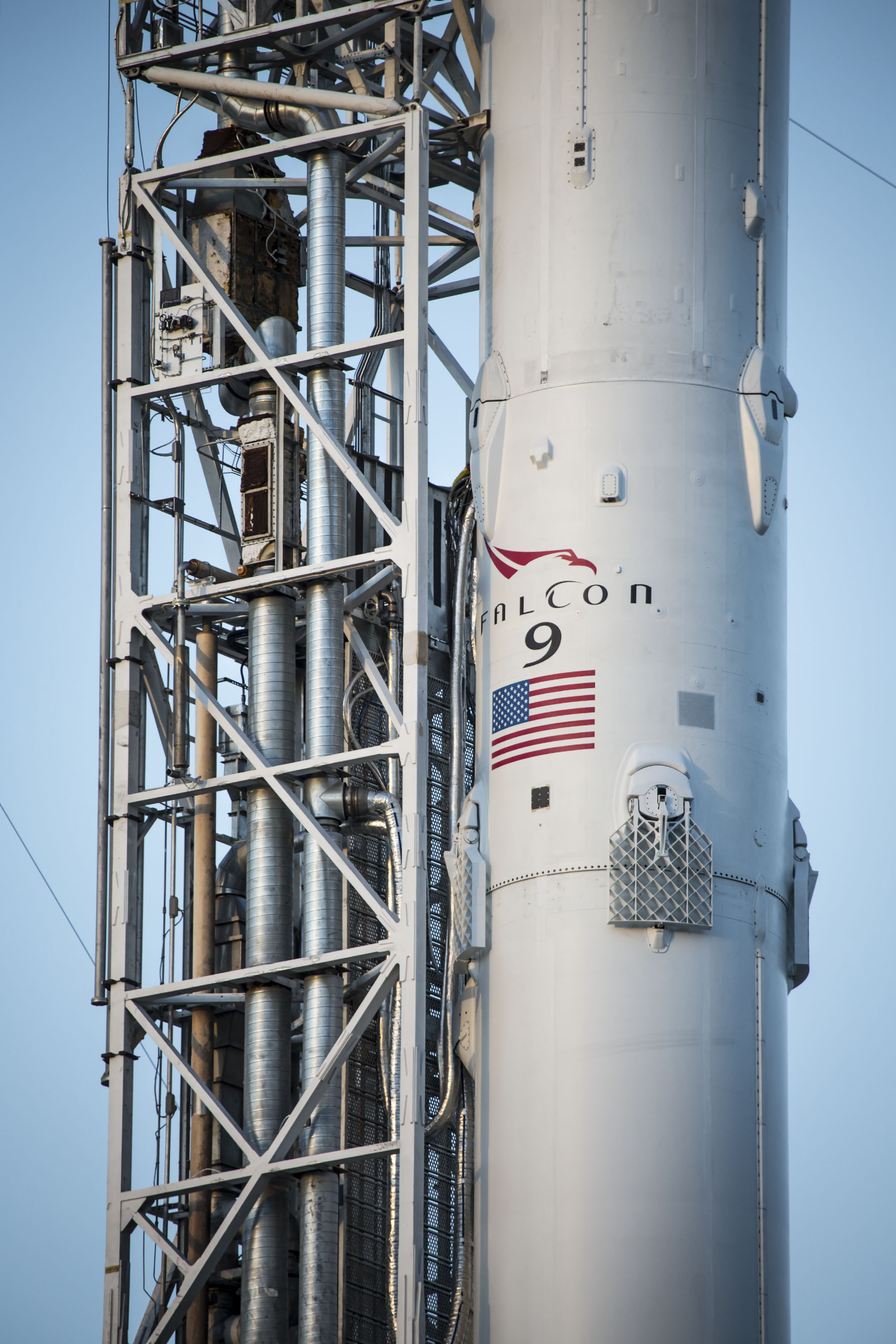
Initial design aluminum grid fins on the Falcon 9 v1.1 launch vehicle, undeployed. February 2015.

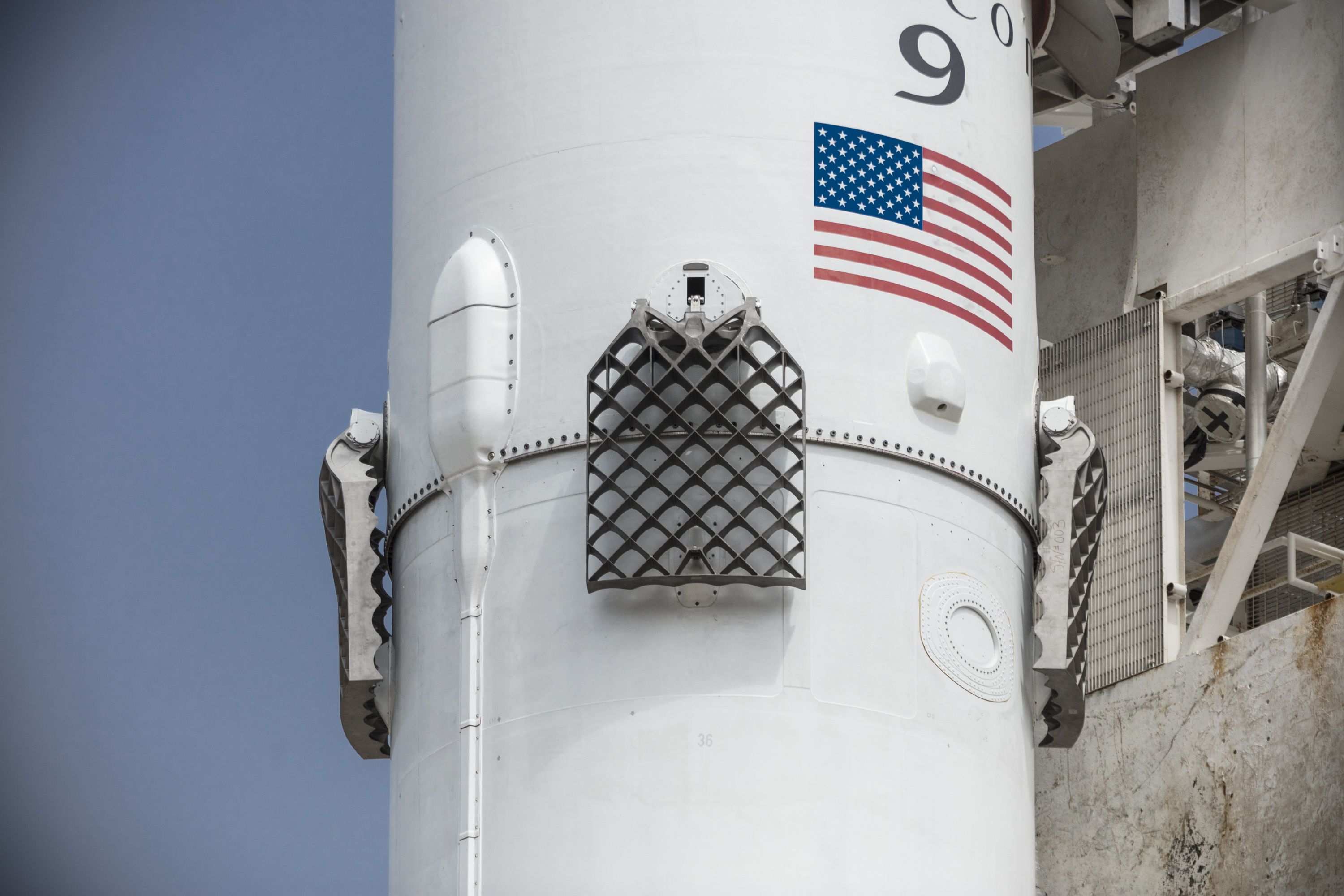
New design titanium grid fins on the Falcon 9 Full Thrust, undeployed. June 2017

Grid fins are used on the SpaceX Falcon 9 rocket for increased precision and accuracy in control of the landing location for reusable launch vehicles. It therefore helps the rocket to land on the landing pad or on the autonomous spaceport drone ship more precisely with good accuracy. The grid fin development effort is a part of the SpaceX reusable launch system development program that has been underway since 2012. The first hypersonic flight test with grid fins was in February 2015, and grid fins were subsequently used on all reusable Falcon 9 experimental test landings and, eventually, after December 2015, an increasing number of successful first stage landings and recoveries.

Iteration on the design of the Falcon 9 grid fins continued into 2017. SpaceX CEO Elon Musk announced in early 2017 that a new version of the Falcon 9 grid fins would improve reusability for the company's vehicles. Falcon 9 Block 5 introduce new cast and cut titanium grid fins. Musk had noted the original Falcon 9 grid fins were made from aluminum. The fins experience temperatures near their maximum survivability limits during reentry and landing, and so the aluminum fins were coated with an ablative thermal protection system. Some aluminum grid fins had caught fire during the entry and landing sequence. The grid fins were replaced with titanium versions, which enabled greater controllability to the rocket and increased the payload to orbit capability by allowing Falcon 9 to fly at a higher angle of attack. The larger and more robust titanium grid fins are left unpainted and were first tested in June 2017. They are used on all reusable Block 5 Falcon 9 first stages since late 2017.

== Gallery ==
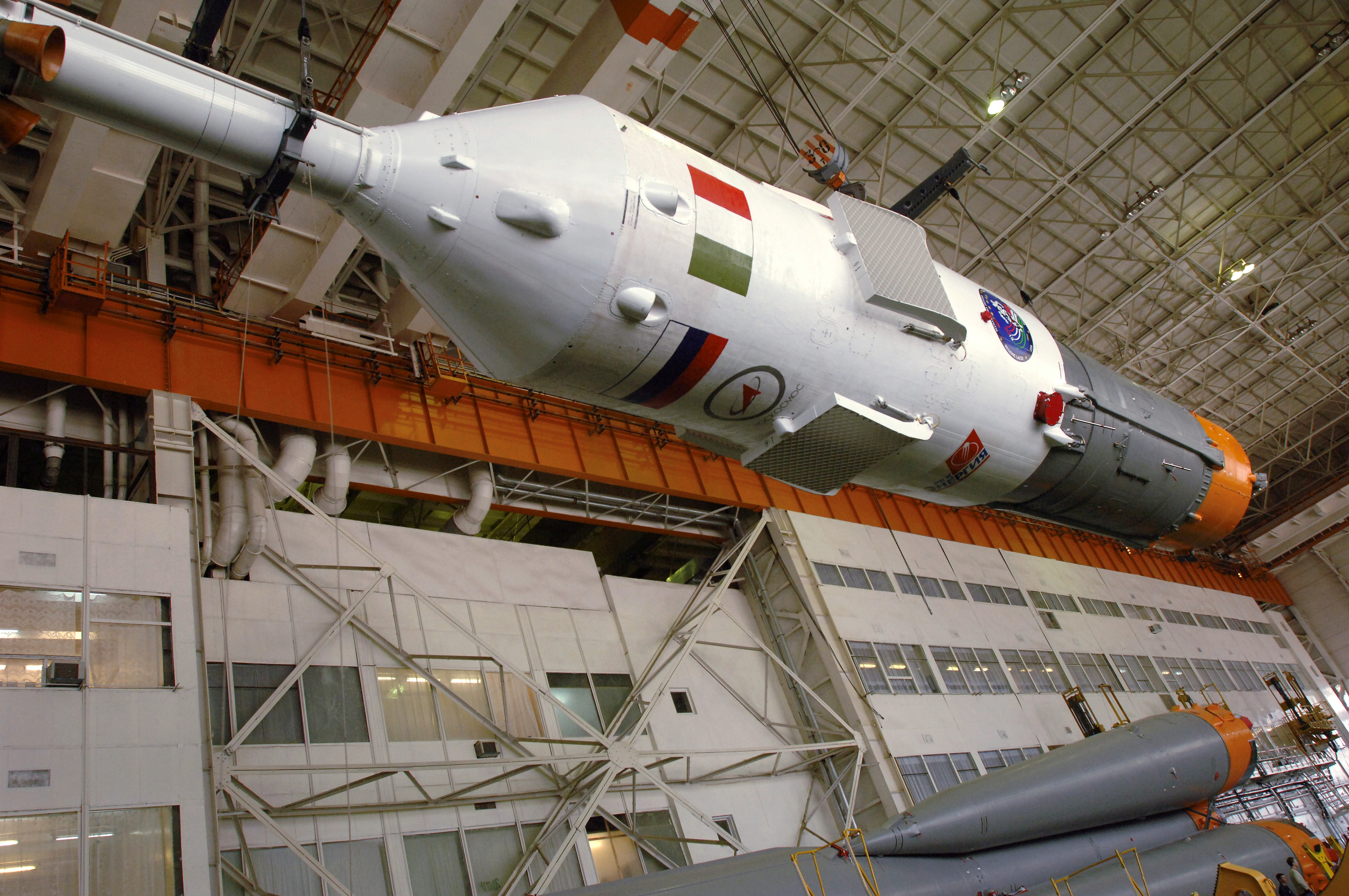
Grid fins (here folded against the payload fairing) are part of the launch escape system of Soyuz spacecraft.

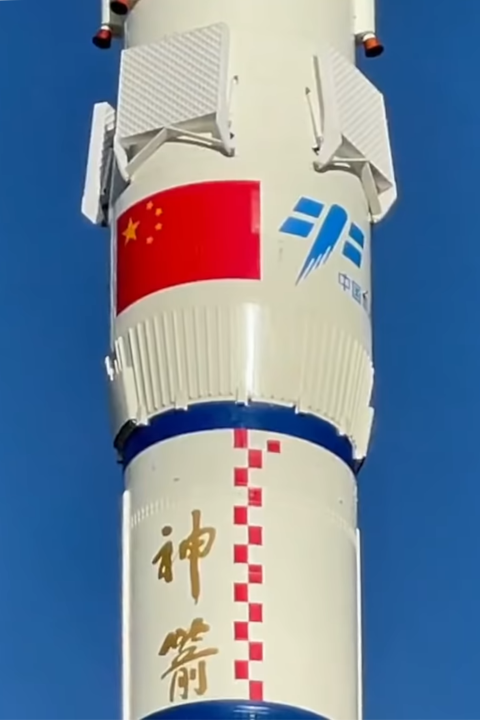
Folded grid fins on Long March 2F designed to ferry crewed Shenzhou spacecraft.

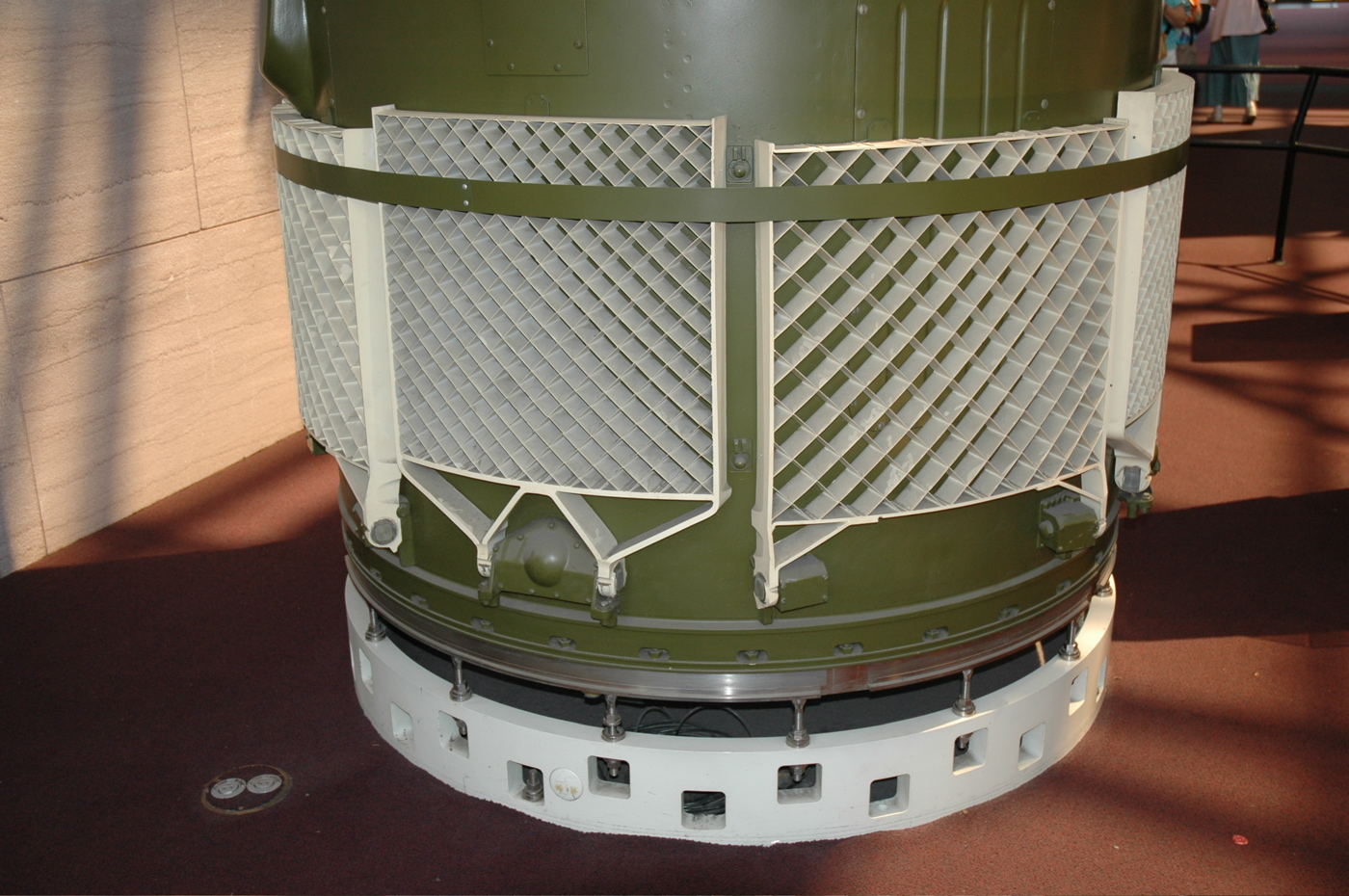
Grid fins stowed against the base of an SS-20 ballistic missile

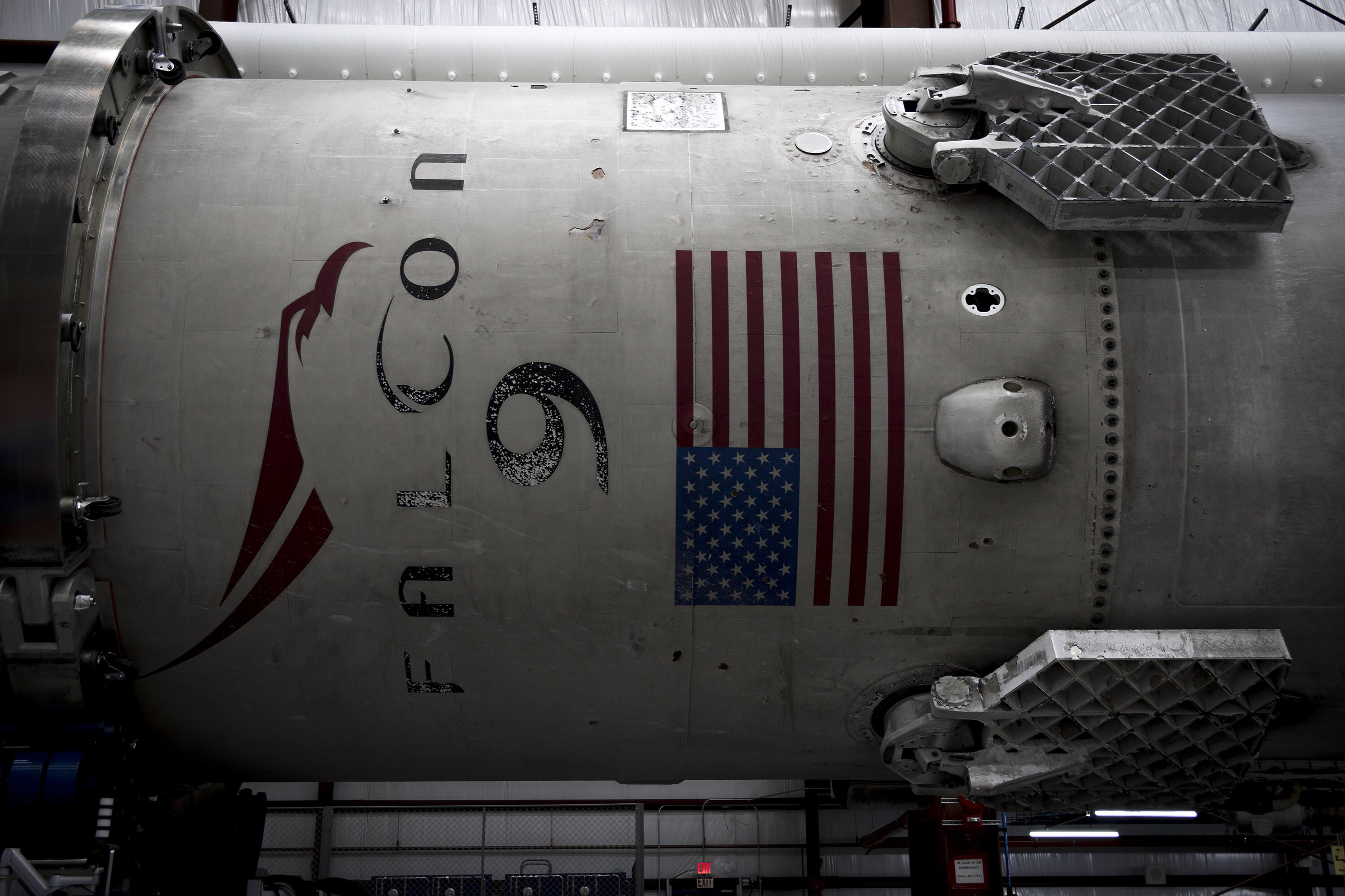
Grid fins on a SpaceX Falcon 9 rocket. They guide the rocket's first stage during landing.

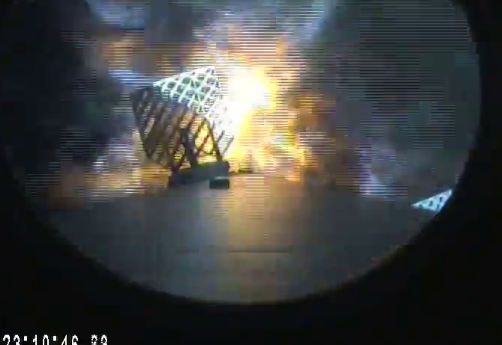
First test of grid fins by SpaceX during a Falcon 9 controlled-descent test on 11 February 2015.

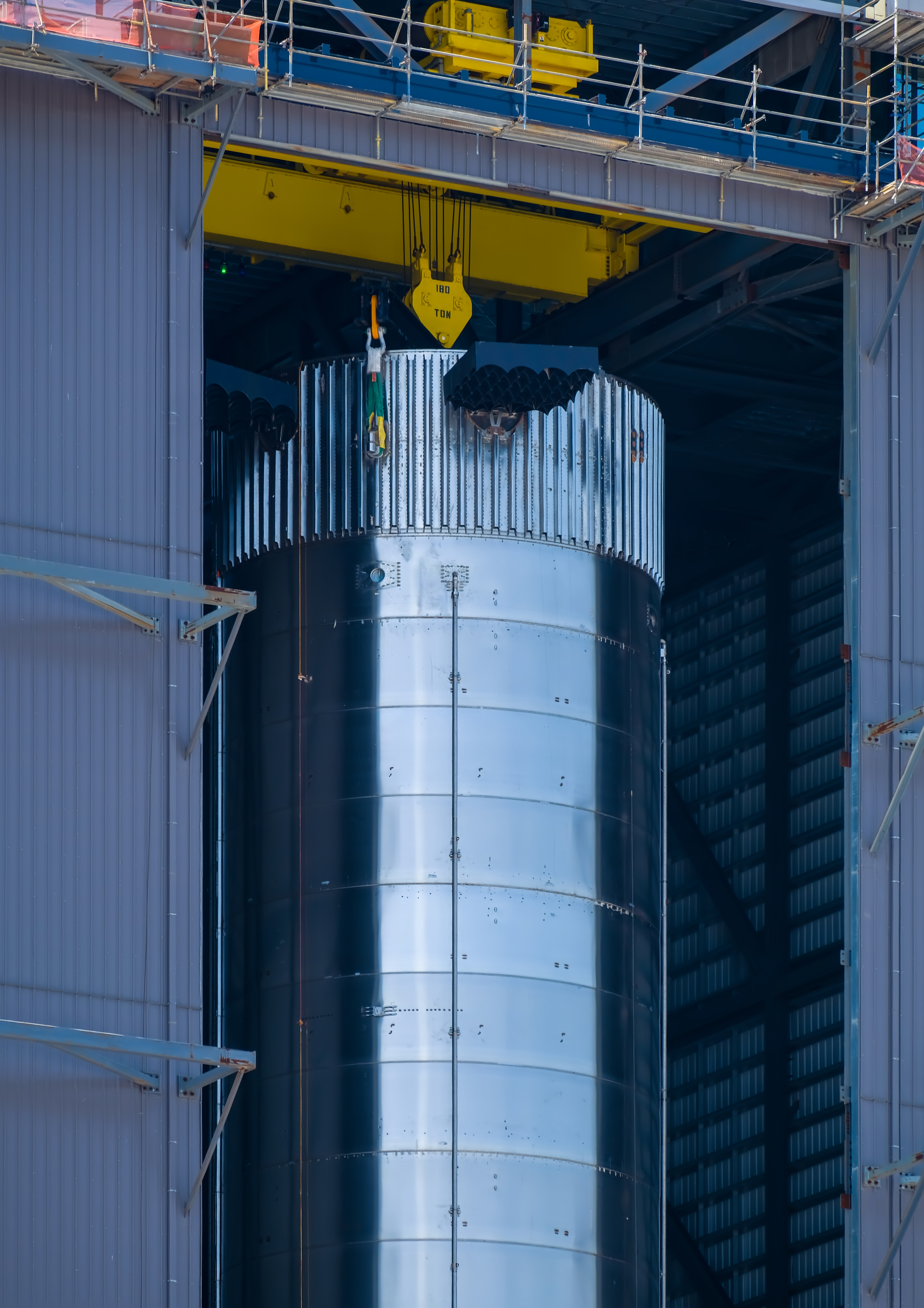
Grid fins deployed Super Heavy Booster Section of the SpaceX Starship
