= History of Eglin Air Force Base =

Eglin Air Force Base, a United States Air Force base located southwest of Valparaiso, Florida, was established in 1935 as the Valparaiso Bombing and Gunnery Base. It is named in honor of Lieutenant Colonel Frederick I. Eglin, who was killed in a crash of his Northrop A-17 pursuit aircraft on a flight from Langley to Maxwell Field, Alabama.

Eglin was the home of the Air Armament Center (AAC) and is one of three product centers in the Air Force Materiel Command (AFMC).

== Creation ==
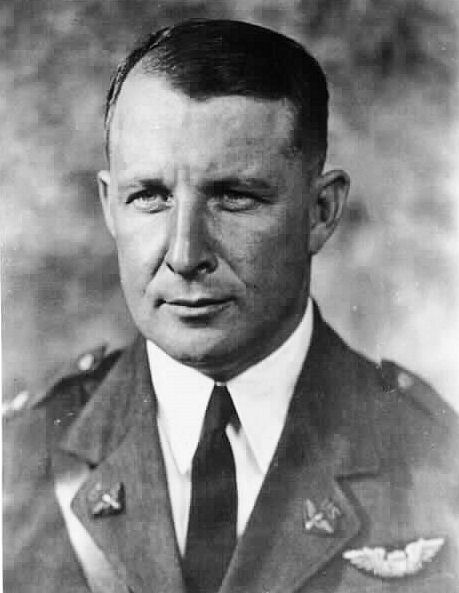
Frederick I. Eglin

Valparaiso Airport was created in 1933, when an arrowhead-shaped parcel of 137 acres (55 ha) was cleared for use as an airdrome.

Two unpaved runways, with a supply house at their intersection, were in use by 1935. "On 1 March 1935, application was made for a FERA grant to pave the runways and to build an office, a barracks 30 by 120, a mess hall and kitchen, and an oil storage building..."

On 4 August 1937, it was named Eglin Field in honor of Lt. Col. Frederick I. Eglin (1891–1937).

A ceremony was held in June 1939 for the dedication and unveiling of a plaque honoring Valparaiso, Florida banker and businessman James E. Plew, as founder of Eglin Field. Embedded in the stone gate to the airfield, the plaque read "In memory of James E. Plew, 1862–1938, whose patriotism and generosity made this field possible."

Captains Delmar T. Spivey and George W. Mundy, 23d Composite Group, Maxwell Field, Alabama, flew two Curtiss YP-37s to Eglin Field for engine testing in December 1939, the first of thousands of service tests.

The Army Air Corps sought to increase gun capacity on existing planes, and contracted on 23 August 1939 for two P-36A Hawk conversions: an XP-36D, 38-174, with two .50-caliber guns in the nose and four .30-caliber wing guns, along with the XP-36E, 38-147, which had eight .30-caliber guns in the wings, like British fighters. Both were at Wright Field by October, and after tests at the Eglin proving ground, the XP-36D’s armament was chosen for the future Curtiss XP-46 and P-40B Warhawk types.

== World War II ==
World War II showed the need for a proving ground for aircraft armament at Eglin. In May 1940, President Franklin D. Roosevelt transmitted to congress a letter, with his approval, from Budget Director Harold D. Smith, asking an appropriation of US$76,750 (equivalent to $1,763,792 in 2025) to purchase 24,111 acres (9,757 ha) of private land within the Choctawhatchee National Forest boundary. The U.S. Forestry ceded to the War Department the Choctawhatchee National Forest on 18 October 1940. Hunters had to be reminded regularly that the base reservation was now off-limits in 1941–1942 and there was some local resentment at the handover. On 15 May 1941, the Air Corps Proving Ground (later the Air Proving Ground Command, on 1 April 1942) was activated, and Eglin became the site for gunnery training for Army Air Forces fighter pilots, as well as for aircraft testing. The 23rd Composite Group moved from Orlando to Eglin Field, 1 July 1941. It comprised the 1st Pursuit Squadron, the 54th Bombardment Squadron (M), the 24th Bombardment Squadron (L), the 54th School Squadron, the 61st Air Base Group, and the 3rd Gunnery and Bombing Range Detachment.

On 16 August 1940, the Okaloosa News-Journal, Crestview, Florida, said that the Southern Bell Telephone Company was placing a line to connect the Eglin Field Army headquarters to the company line at Holt, Florida. The newspaper also said that President Franklin Roosevelt had approved a plan on 14 August for a Works Projects Administration (WPA) project for improvements at Eglin. A Civilian Conservation Corps (CCC) camp was erected at Valparaiso, Florida, from November 1940 for the CCC workers engaged in base construction.

On 1 October 1940, the installation was named the Eglin Field Military Reservation due to its importance to the Air Corps. Work on Auxiliary Field 1 began 27 November 1940. Clearing and grading for Auxiliary Field No.2 began 9 January, Auxiliary Field No. 3 on 23 January, and $800,000 (equivalent to $17,511,312 in 2025) allocated for the grading and paving of fields 1, 3, 5, and 6 on 24 April 1941. The Louisville and Nashville Railroad laid a siding in Crestview, Florida, for oil tankcars supplying the Asphalt Products Company for the paving job of the new airfields. Trucks operated round the clock to offload the tankcars.

Congressman Robert L. F. Sikes of Crestview in mid-April 1941 announced appropriations for construction and installation of water, sewage, electrical facilities, sidewalks, roads, fences, parking areas, landscaping and for the construction of a sewage disposal plant. Submitted to the WPA headquarters in Washington, D.C., in late March, the request received presidential approval in April. Work continued apace on some projects on a 24-hour-a-day basis. Nearly $20 million was spent on construction at Eglin from 1941 to 1944.

A housing shortage was partially eased by the construction of 100 units of the Plew Heights Defense Housing Project near Valparaiso for civil service employees and enlisted personnel. The Federal Works Agency, Division of Defense Housing, awarded the contract for the task to the Paul A. Miller Construction Company of Leesburg, Florida, on 5 May 1941, with construction beginning on 8 May. The 11 November 1941 deadline for completion was beaten by almost a month.

Eglin Field was designated as the Air Corps Proving Ground on 19 May 1941. The Air Proving Ground Command was activated on 1 April 1942.

In June 1941, the Officers Club of Eglin Field arranged to take over the Valparaiso Inn, Valparaiso, Florida, erected in 1924 by James E. Plew, as the "O Club". Doolittle Raiders would later lodge here during their training at Eglin. A recreation center for enlisted men was opened in Crestview on Saturday 21 June 1941, through the efforts of the Community Recreation Council, the Works Progress Administration, and the Okaloosa Progressive Association.

In November 1941, the 97th Engineer Battalion, "consisting of approximately 1,000 colored troops under the leadership of white officers," were transferred from Camp Blanding, Florida, to Eglin Field. The battalion, under the command of Maj. Benjamin C. J. Fowlkes, made up largely of Selective Service trainees, and activated 1 June 1941, was "engaged in clearing ranges and auxiliary flying fields and also in constructing and maintaining roads on the huge Eglin Field Reservation." The unit was expected to return to Camp Blanding upon completion of its task.

A new United Services Organization (USO) recreation facility for enlisted men opened in Valparaiso in February 1942, with the first formal dance held on Friday 27 February.

On 10 March 1942, the first test flight of a second batch of Kettering-General Motors A-1 flying bombs was conducted at Eglin Field but crashed.

=== Doolittle Raiders ===
Eglin was the primary training location for the Doolittle Raid on the Japanese mainland. The 24 crews selected and led by Lieutenant Colonel James "Jimmy" Doolittle picked up modified North American B-25B Mitchell medium bombers in Minneapolis, Minnesota, and flew them to Eglin beginning on 1 March 1942. "9–25 March: Lieutenant Colonel James Doolittle and a B-25 detachment of 72 officers and 75 enlisted men from Lexington County Airport, Columbia, South Carolina, were at Eglin Field in rehearsals for the Tokyo raid."

=== Wartime testing ===
Operational suitability tests were conducted with a pair of P-38F Lightnings, 41-7536 and 41-7612, between 7 August 1942 and 26 January 1943.

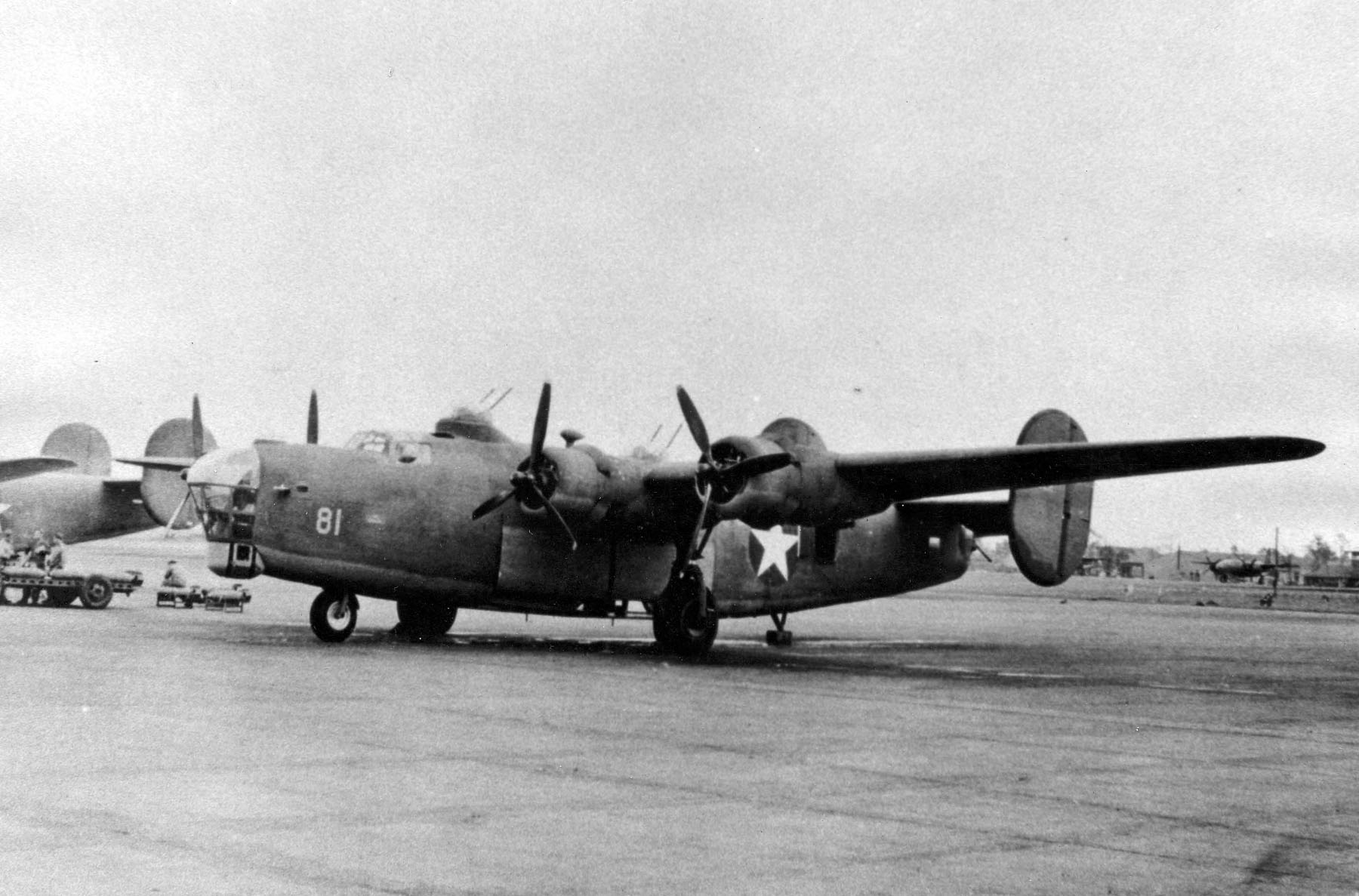
Sole XB-41 gunship conversion, for role already being disproved by YB-40s over Europe. Wide-chord propellers have not yet been installed in this photo.

On 29 January 1943, the sole XB-41, a conversion of a Consolidated B-24D Liberator, into a gunship, was delivered to Eglin Field. Guns were added which brought the total armament to fourteen 0.50-inch machine guns. Tests indicated that the center of gravity was improperly located, making the aircraft unstable. On 21 March 1943, the Army declared the XB-41 as being operationally unsuitable, and plans for thirteen YB-41 Liberator conversions were cancelled. Consolidated worked on the prototype, equipped the aircraft with wide-blade propellers and subjected the plane to a weight-reduction program. On 28 July 1943, the XB-41 was returned to Eglin for more tests.

Testing of the first B-25 Mitchell armed with 75-millimetre (3.0 in) cannon was completed by the Air Proving Ground Command on 26 March 1943. It had first flown 2 October 1942. B-25C-1, 41-13296, c/n 82-5931, the final airframe of the -1 production block, was modified as the XB-25G prototype, fitted with a 75-mm M4 cannon which was 9.5 feet (2.9 m) long. The transparent nose was replaced with a shortened armored solid nose that reduced overall length to 51 feet (16 m). The cannon was mounted in a cradle in the lower left-hand side of the nose, which extended underneath the pilot's seat with a spring mechanism forming part of the gun mount to take up the 21-inch (530 mm) recoil. The cannon-armed Mitchell would enjoy success in the Southwest Pacific theatre.

On 25 April 1943, the first women arrived at Eglin, comprising two officers and 149 enrolled members as part of the 118th WAAC Post Headquarters Company.

In June 1943, in-flight refueling trials were conducted at Eglin with a Consolidated B-24D Liberator modified as a tanker and a Boeing B-17E Flying Fortress as a receiver aircraft by Pennsylvania Central Airlines with the assistance of Flight Refuelling Limited engineers from the United Kingdom. The B-17 received the fuel through a grapple system mounted in the tail gunners position.

=== Worst accident ===
On 12 July 1943, Eglin suffered its worst loss of life when 17 personnel were killed in an explosives test at ~1700 hrs. Wartime censorship and the fact that 15 of the 17 were airmen of the African-American-staffed 867th Aviation Engineering Battalion contributed to the accident receiving virtually no publicity. The identities of the dead, including the two white officers supervising, were never released, and only one small newspaper article was published mentioning the incident. A documentary, The Eglin 17, debuted at the 2009 African American Heritage Month luncheon at the Eglin Air Force Base Officer's Club on 18 February 2009, providing the story of the forgotten accident. "The cause and circumstances surrounding the incident remain 'clouded in mystery,' according to the documentary," although Lt. Col. Allen Howser (Ret.), featured in the documentary, recalled that it was part of an exercise to test fire a newly acquired explosive.

=== Additional testing ===
Thirteen YP-61 Black Widow night fighter service test models were delivered to the Army's Material Command between August and September 1943. The first of three YPs delivered to the Air Proving Ground Command at Eglin Field arrived in the first week of September for operational suitability tests.

For the P-61 Black Widow night fighter, the National Research Committee conducted tests on various paint schemes. Three aircraft were used, one in standard olive drab and grey, one in matte black as used by the British and the Germans, and one in gloss black. These were flown through a barrage of searchlights over Fort Barrancas where the olive drab and matte black planes were easily spotted. They did not spot the glossy black paint scheme. The searchlights had failed to detect it.

By late 1943, Maj. Gen. Henry H. Arnold directed Brig. Gen. Grandison Gardner's electronic engineers at Eglin Field, Florida, to outfit war-weary bombers with automatic pilots so that they could be remotely controlled. This was the preliminary work for the Operation Aphrodite flying bomb drone missions in Europe in 1944.

When the Army Air Force reestablished the all-black 477th Bombardment Group (Medium) to train in North American B-25 Mitchells in January 1944, "The leaders of the Army Air Corps [sic] and the War Department had no more interest in black pilots commanding bombers than there had been in the program that put African-Americans into the cockpits of sleek fighter aircraft. The 477th Bombardment Group was formed because of an undiminished public pressure exerted by African-American leaders, newspapers, unions, and civic groups." Gunners were trained at Eglin Field. The group "experienced some of the most bitter racism of any of the black units ever formed, constantly confronted with bigotry, segregation, and frustration from its activation to war's end. Between May 1944 and June 1945, the 477th endured thirty-eight unit moves." The effect was devastating to the success of the training program. This would culminate in the Freeman Field Mutiny in April 1945. African-American Colonel Benjamin O. Davis, Jr. replaced archly-bigoted Colonel Robert R. Selway as commanding officer at the 477th, on 1 July 1945, then located at Freeman Field, Indiana.

Charles Lindbergh accompanied a flight from Eglin Field on 21 January 1944, in an experimental B-29, which arrived at the base for tests.

A single vertical tail was tested on a Consolidated B-24D Liberator flown with a Douglas B-23 Dragon fin on 6 March 1943. Then the XB-24K, a B-24D-40-CO, 42-40234, modified by Ford, was flown 9 September 1943, with a high single tail fin, R-1830-65 engines, and Convair nose turret. Improvements in flight handling and field of fire for the rear guns was so great that the Eglin Field Proving Ground recommended on 26 April 1944, that all future B-24s be ordered with single tails.

"In January 1944, Eglin became an important contributor to 'Operation Crossbow,' which called for the destruction of German missile launching facilities. Thousands worked around the clock for 12 days to construct a duplicate German V-1 facility. Subsequent bombing runs against this copycat facility taught Army Air Forces tacticians which attack angles and weapons would prove most effective against the German launchers." The site was created using hundreds of aerial photos of V-1 facilities that Gen. Carl A. Spaatz, commander of Allied air forces in England, and Lt. Gen. Doolittle, commander of the Eighth Air Force, had called for "a technical and tactical inquiry into the means, methods, and effectiveness of attacks." Gen. Arnold witnessed a test on 15 February. "Medium- and high-level bombing missions conducted on simulated V-1 targets proved conclusively that V-1 targets were indeed hard to hit. Fragmentation bombs seemed to be the most effective."

In February 1944, tests were conducted with M-69 Incendiary cluster bombs against a crude replica Japanese wooden community-style target erected on a range. Various fusing delays were investigated. Lee J. Cobb, portraying an Army Air Force briefing officer, narrated one of the film reports on the project. Concrete and reinforced concrete roofs were much less likely to be penetrated by the six-pound M-69s.

On 24 March 1944, the second of only two Vultee XP-54 experimental fighters made its only flight, a 20-minute hop from Downey, California, to San Bernardino Army Air Field, California, for USAAF acceptance, but suffered a failed Lycoming engine en route. The P-54 project was canceled and the airframe grounded to support the first prototype at Wright Field, Ohio. The swiveling nose of the airframe was sent to Eglin Field for armament tests, although the weapons were never fired in the air.

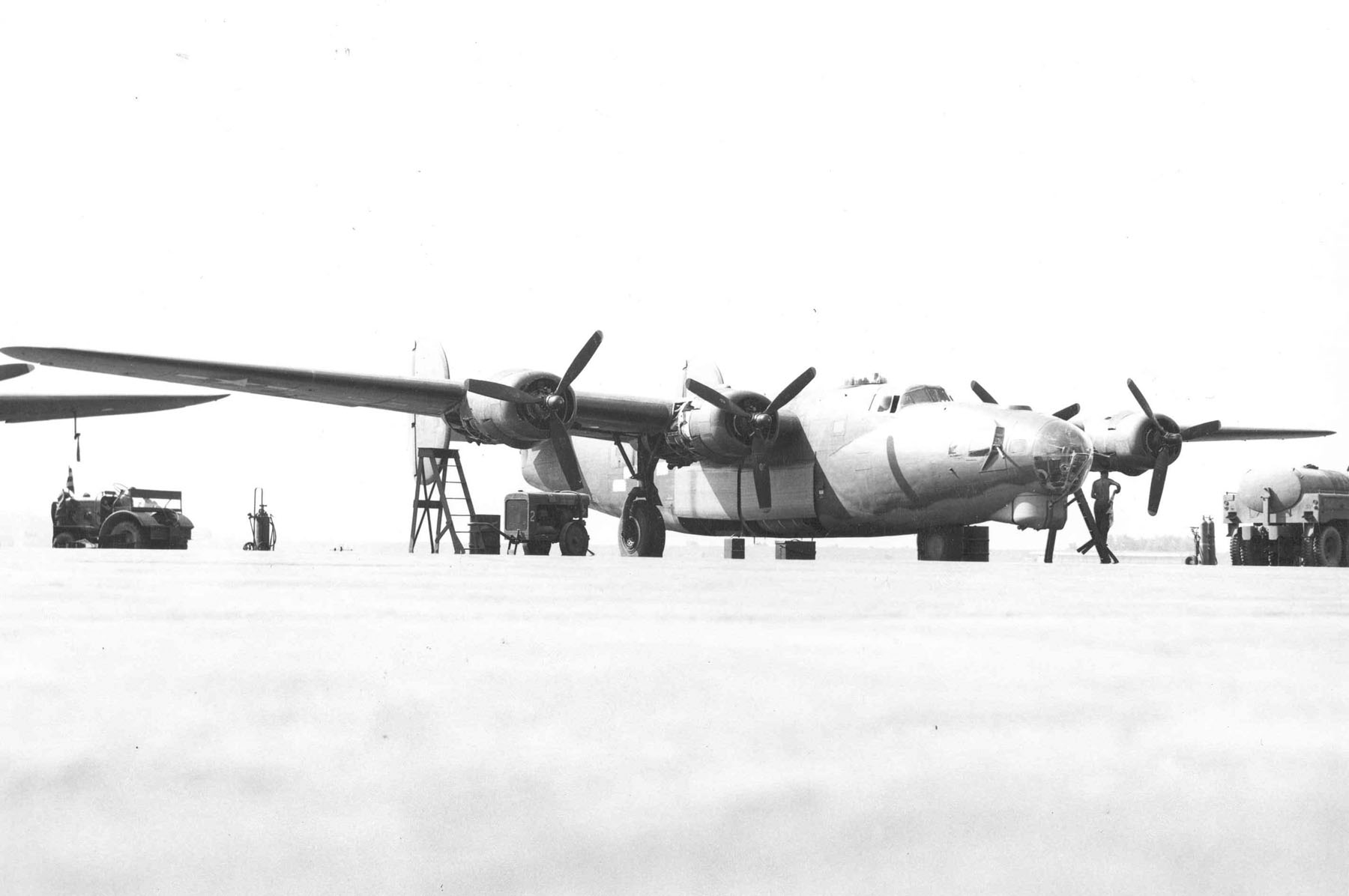
Experimental B-24J 42-73130, with B-17G nose section, containing chin turret, grafted on; modification not adopted for production

From March 1944, the Wright Field, Ohio, Weight Reduction Committee, working to improve performance and crew accommodations in the B-24 Liberator, proposed mating a B-17 Flying Fortress nose to a B-24, with the Air Materiel Command assigning the experiment a First Priority Project rating on 25 May 1944. During a brief check-out flight on 6 July by the Flight Section of Materiel Command at Wright Field, with a gross takeoff weight of 56,000 pounds (25,000 kg) and after speed, power and stability tests at 10,000 feet (3,000 m) the test crew concluded the aircraft performance was "essentially the same as other B-24 airplanes", but with an airspeed "apparently 8.5 mph (13.7 km/h) faster". The Eglin test report considered the modified aircraft "operationally unsuitable".

On 11 August 1944, an Army Air Force plane accidentally dropped a bomb on the Cosson family home on the edge of the Eglin Range, killing four and injuring five. In June 2010, Walton County officials commemorated the loss with a plaque to mark the area as an historic site.

The first JB-2 launch at Eglin took place on 12 October 1944. Eglin would continue JB-2 tests through 1946 to improve launch and guidance, including remote launchings from B-17s and B-29s.

The sole Northrop JB-1A Bat, nicknamed "Thunderbug" due to the improvised General Electric B-1 turbojets' "peculiar squeal", a jet-propelled flying wing spanning 28 feet 4 inches (8.64 m) to carry 2,000 pounds (910 kg). bombs in pods close to the engines, made its first powered, but unmanned, flight from Santa Rosa Island on 7 December 1944, launching from a pair of rails laid across the sand dunes. It climbed rapidly, stalled, and crashed 400 yards from the launch point. Makeshift B-1 turbojets did not live up to expectation, so JB-1s are completed with pulsejet power as JB-10s.

=== Bouncing bomb tests ===
The success of the Royal Air Force using Barnes Wallace's bouncing bombs in the dam busting missions of Operation Chastise on 16–17 May 1943, led the USAAF to investigate using similar tactics. After initial testing with a modified A-26 in January 1945 which was adapted at the Vickers experimental facility at Foxwarren, near Esher, Surrey, to drop the RAF spherical 35-inch (890 mm) Highball casing, with [an overall weight] of 950 pounds (430 kg), twenty-five Speedee bomb casings (the American nomenclature for the Highball) were sent to the U.S. On 28 April 1945, A-26C-25-DT Invader, 43-22644, assigned to the 611 Base Unit at Wright Field, Ohio, departed Eglin for a low-level test drop on Water Range No. 60 in the Choctawhatchee Bay S of Lake Lorraine. Dropped at low altitude (~10 feet), the weapon skipped back into the aircraft, completely knocking off the tail unit causing the bomber to nose over instantly and crash into the bay 3 miles (4.8 km) NE of Fort Walton, Florida. Following this accident, the Army Air Force dropped its interest into this attack method.

=== Late war testing ===
On 30 June 1945, the third of 75 Lockheed P-38M-5-LO Lightning night fighter conversions arrived at Eglin Field from the Lockheed Dallas Modification Center for Operational Suitability Testing. For the next two months the P-38M-5 was flown against a standard P-38L-5-LO and a somewhat "test-weary" P-61B Black Widow. It was found to be operationally suitable as a night fighter as far as airplane performance and characteristics were concerned. Compared to the P-38L-5, the M's handling qualities and flying characteristics had not been materially affected, though its top speed was about 15 miles per hour (24 km/h) lower. The Eglin tests found the P-38M superior to the P-61B in speed at altitudes, rate of climb, operational ceiling, and ease of flying at high speeds. The fixed armament of the Lightning limited its effective attack approach to a level stern approach. "In all-around effectiveness the P-38M would probably be superior to the P-61B because its performance would enable it to intercept enemy airplanes which the P-61B is incapable of intercepting. Against enemy types which both airplanes are capable of intercepting, the P-61B would probably prove more effective because of its superior equipment and armament arrangement."

At the time of the design of the super-heavy intercontinental Convair B-36 Peacemaker bomber in the mid-1940s, Eglin Field had one of only three runways in the world capable of withstanding the landing gear footprint of the original 110-inch (2,800 mm) single tire main gear design of the fully loaded bomber (concrete at least 22 inches (560 mm) thick). The B-36 would undergo a redesign for a four-wheel main gear bogie with 56-inch (1,400 mm) tires to reduce this operational constraint and allow B-36s to operate from runways able to support Boeing B-29 Superfortresses. (The other two runways were at the Convair plant at Fort Worth, Texas, and at Fairfield-Suisun Field, California.)

== Post-war era ==
Boeing B-29 Superfortress 42-6413, was sent to the Eglin Proving Ground for tests on 31 August 1945. After the war, Eglin became a pioneer in developing the techniques for missile launching and handling; and the development of drone or pilotless aircraft beginning with the Republic-Ford JB-2 Loon, an American copy of the V-1. The 1st Experimental Guided Missiles Group was activated at Eglin Field, Florida, on 6 February 1946, operating out of Auxiliary Field 3. Pursuant to an order from the War Department, dated 25 January 1946, the Commanding General of the Army Air Forces Center at Eglin Field was directed to activate the Headquarters, 1st Experimental Guided Missiles Group, the 1st Experimental Guided Missiles Squadron and the 1st Experimental Air Service Squadron. The total authorized strength for the three organizations was 130 officers, one warrant officer and 714 enlisted men. Eglin's commander was directed to supply manpower for the units from his own resources, but, given the recent postwar demobilization, his ability to do so was extremely limited. Operations were conducted out of Auxiliary Field 3 (Duke Field). On 13 January 1947, a successful drone flight from Eglin to Washington, D.C. was conducted utilizing a QB-17 Flying Fortress. A QB-17G, 44-85648, was utilized in a ditching test program at Eglin in 1948 when it was landed in the water by radio control. Ironically, although nine of the approximately 43 surviving intact B-17s in the world were assigned to the 3200th and 3205th Drone Groups at Eglin, the example displayed at the Air Force Armament Museum is not one of them, having been a former U.S. Navy PB-1W patrol model.

In 1946, extensive tests were done on Razon guided bombs by the Air Proving Ground Command, "contemplating using the missile aboard all-weather bombers. Nothing materialized, however, until the Korean War when the Far East Air Forces ordered and used the Tarzon, a Tallboy-Razon combination."

On 31 March 1946, the Air Proving Ground Command completed the tactical suitability test of the Hughes JB-3 Tiamat, Project MX-570, an air-to-air missile. Program canceled post-war due to other more promising types being developed.

Between mid-1946 and 11 December 1946, the Army Air Force evaluated the third of the three Boeing XF8B Navy fighter prototypes, BuNo 57986, at Eglin as a potential fighter-bomber, but nothing came of the idea, it being found to be inferior in the rôle to the P-47 Thunderbolt already in service.

Lt. Col. Ashley C. McKinley, because of his experiences in ferrying aircraft to the Soviet Union, suggested in 1943 that all aircraft and equipment be operable at temperatures as low as −65 °F (−54 °C) and that a refrigerated hangar be erected at Eglin AFB to produce such an environment under controlled conditions. Since testing in Alaska was expensive and had produced only meager results, Col. McKinley reasoned that testing under controlled conditions would be far superior in useful results and up to ten times more economical. The Climatic Laboratory finished construction on 24 May 1947. Initial costs were estimated at nearly $2,000,000. The actual cost, at the end of construction, had risen to $5,500,000, indicative of the many problems encountered by the designers and builders. Testing began in May 1947. The first items tested included the Fairchild C-82 Packet, Boeing B-29 Superfortress, Lockheed F-80, North American P-51, Lockheed P-38, and the Sikorsky H-5D helicopter.

The 1st Experimental Guided Missiles Group, apart from receiving nationwide attention for completing the drone flight from Eglin to Washington D.C. on a simulated bombing mission, the Group received little notice in its own right. Without higher supply and personnel priorities, very little else could be accomplished. The situation began to change in March 1947, when the Group moved to Eglin's main base and received its first series of test projects. The Group was given the JB-2 and it got involved in VB-6 Felix, VB-3 Razon, and VB-13 Tarzon guided bomb activities.

On 26 July 1947, President Harry S Truman signed the National Security Act of 1947 which restructured the military and intelligence services into the Department of Defense. With this, the Army Air Forces became the independent Department of the Air Force, effective 18 September 1947.

January 1948 was the first month without an aviation accident since the base was founded. Total flying hours for the month were 3,725, "an unusually high number for the Proving Ground," said Lt. Gerald E. Gibson, aircraft safety officer for the base. A six-month fatality-free period came to an end on 9 April 1948 when a pilot was killed in a P-51D Mustang crash N of Crestview, Florida.

The first production Convair B-36A heavy bomber, B-36A-1-CF Peacemaker, 44-92004, c/n 1, officially accepted by the USAF in May 1948, was delivered on 18 June 1948 to the Air Proving Ground Command to undergo extensive testing.

A Boeing C-97 Stratofreighter was assigned at Eglin for tests from 1948 onward and made two flights to Alaska and two trans-Atlantic crossings to the British Isles by July 1950.

On 31 October 1948, the 3201st WAC Squadron was redesignated the 3201st WAF Squadron, 3201st Air Base Group, following the establishment of women as an integrated part of the U.S. Air Force on 30 June of that year. The first commander was 1st Lt. Bertie S. Roberts, assuming command on 5 November 1948.

On 7 November 1948, the second prototype of the Republic Republic XR-12-RE Rainbow reconnaissance design, 44-91003, crashed at 1300 hrs. while returning to Eglin from a photographic suitability test flight on its second test flight at the base by the Photo Test Squadron of the 3200th Proof Test Group. Unable to maintain control after the number 2 (port inner) engine exploded, the pilot ordered the crew to bail out. Five of the seven crew escaped safely and were rescued by Eglin crash boats and helicopters. Airframe impacted two miles (3 kilometers) south of the base, in the Choctawhatchee Bay. Although further testing of the first prototype was conducted (at Aberdeen Proving Grounds, Maryland), an order for an additional six was cancelled.

The sole remaining Hughes XR-11 reconnaissance aircraft prototype, 44-70156, arrived at Eglin in December 1948 from Wright Field, Ohio, to undergo operational suitability testing through July 1949 but a production contract for 98 was cancelled. The airframe was transferred to Sheppard AFB, Texas, on 26 July 1949 for use as a ground maintenance trainer by the 3750th Technical Training Wing, and was dropped from the USAF inventory in November 1949.

In early 1949, Air Materiel Command assigned North American F-86A-1-NA Sabre, 47-608, to Eglin for cold weather testing in the climatic hangar.

Between 2 February and 6 March 1949, the Air Proving Ground conducted tests in conjunction with Wright-Patterson AFB to determine if the Republic F-84D Thunderjet had improved shortcomings in earlier models of the fighter. These concluded that the F-84 range, acceleration, versatility, load carrying ability, high altitude climb, and level flight speed exceeded that of the Lockheed F-80 Shooting Star. The F-84 was inferior to the F-80, however, in shortness of takeoff roll, low altitude climb, and maneuverability.

In the spring of 1949, the 3200th Proof Test Group tested launching Republic-Ford JB-2s from the wings of B-36 bombers at Eglin AFB. About a year later, JB-2s were tested as aerial targets for experimental infrared gunsights.

Realizing the necessity of testing and evaluating the B-36 Peacemaker's APG-3 radar tail turret system, Headquarters, United States Air Force, directed the 7th Bomb Wing to undertake testing. The APG-3 was a radar airborne gun sighting system that provided for aircraft detection and automatic fire control of the tail-turret guns, designed to detect and automatically track targets up to 5,000 yards in range on fighter-type aircraft. However, it was possible to extend that search range temporarily on fighters. After a particular target had been selected by the gunner-radar operator, the system automatically tracked the target within its angular limits in both range and direction. Also, the system automatically directed and pointed the gun turret in the correct firing position. The only mechanical function of the gunner was the activation of the firing mechanism when the target was in effective firing range. One B-36B, 44-92042, of the 26th Bomb Squadron, 11th Bomb Group, was modified for testing as the right gun on the APG-3 was removed and a 35 mm Vitarama camera installed in lieu of the turret. The first mission was flown on 25 October 1949, over Eglin AFB Gunnery Range, at 25,000 feet (7,600 m). Three passes were made on the tail position by two Lockheed F-80 Shooting Stars. Following those passes the APG-3 radar system failed. The malfunction of the radar system was due to low voltage transmitted to the modular and to an antenna tilt motor failure.

On 1 November, the wing flew its second APG-3 Tail Turret System evaluation test. A total of 12 passes were made in the Eglin AFB Gunnery Range by two F-80 jet fighters at 25,000 feet (7,600 m). Both fighters and the B-36B assigned to the 26th Bomb Squadron, 11th Bomb Group, staged out of Eglin AFB. The next day, a fighter intercept gun-camera mission was flown on 2 November, out of Carswell AFB, Texas, in a B-36B of the 7th Bomb Group. Two North American F-82 Twin Mustang fighters from Bergstrom AFB, Austin, Texas, intercepted the bomber at 25,000 feet (7,600 m) in the vicinity of Austin. The purpose of the mission, as in any gun-camera mission, was to provide "tracking" and "framing" experience for the B-36 gunners. Also, it provided experience in interception for the fighter pilots. A third test of the APG-3 system was flown out of Eglin AFB on 7 November. A total of 18 passes were made by two F-80s on the bomber at 15,000 feet (4,600 m).

On 15 December 1949, Johnson Hall, home of Headquarters Air Proving Ground Center, was named for Maj. Simon H. Johnson, Jr., deputy commanding officer of the Eglin AFB, Florida, fighter section, who was killed on 11 May 1948 when his Republic P-84 Thunderjet disintegrated during an air demonstration at Range 52 on the Eglin reservation, in front of some 600 witnesses. Johnson was also serving as the acting commanding officer, operations officer, and test pilot for the Eglin fighter section at the time of his death.

== Early Cold War ==
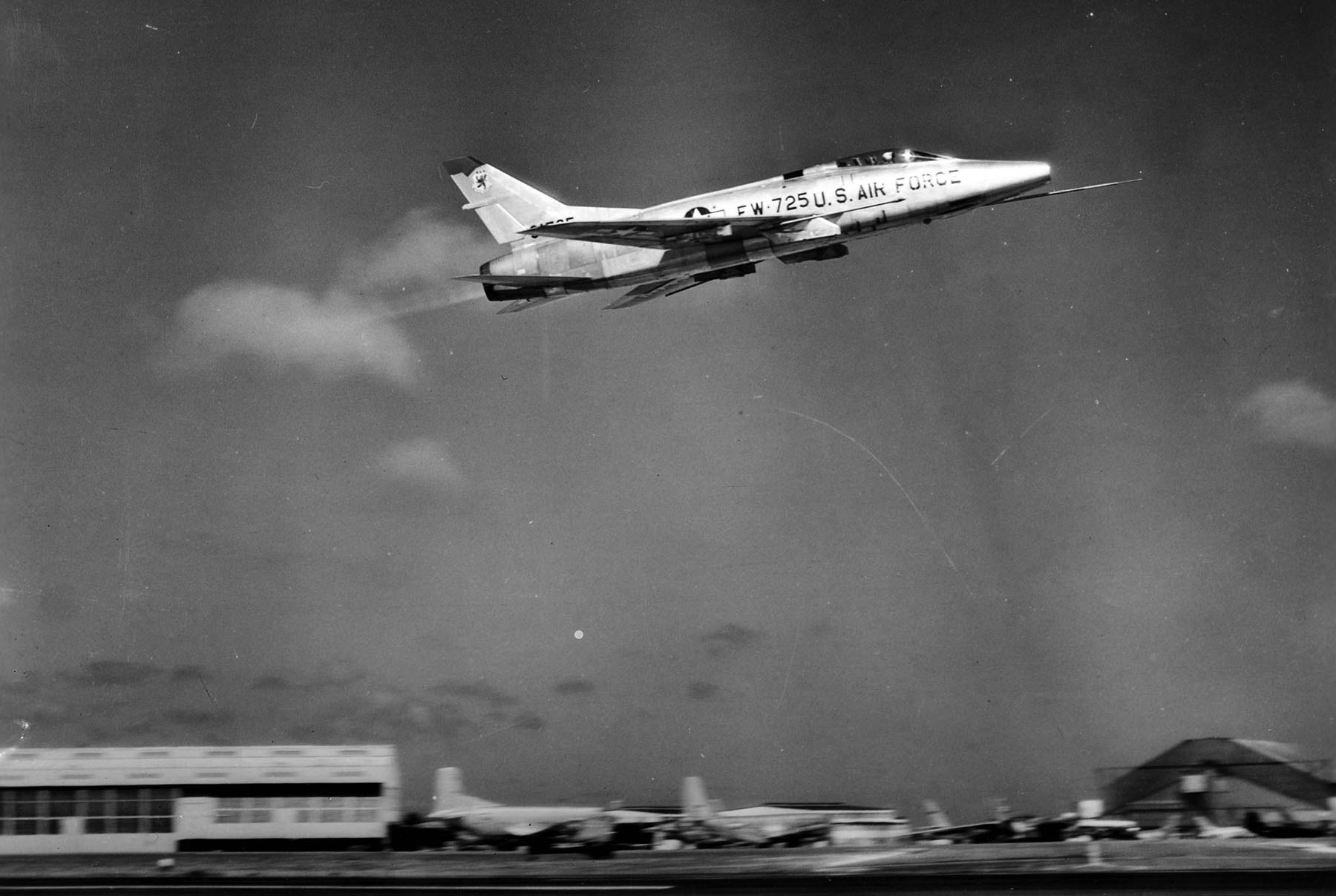
A U.S. Air Force North American F-100C Super Sabre jet takes off from Eglin Air Force Base. Note the Air Proving Ground griffin badge ("Proof by Test") on the vertical fin. The McKinley Climatic Laboratory is at the right rear of the photo.

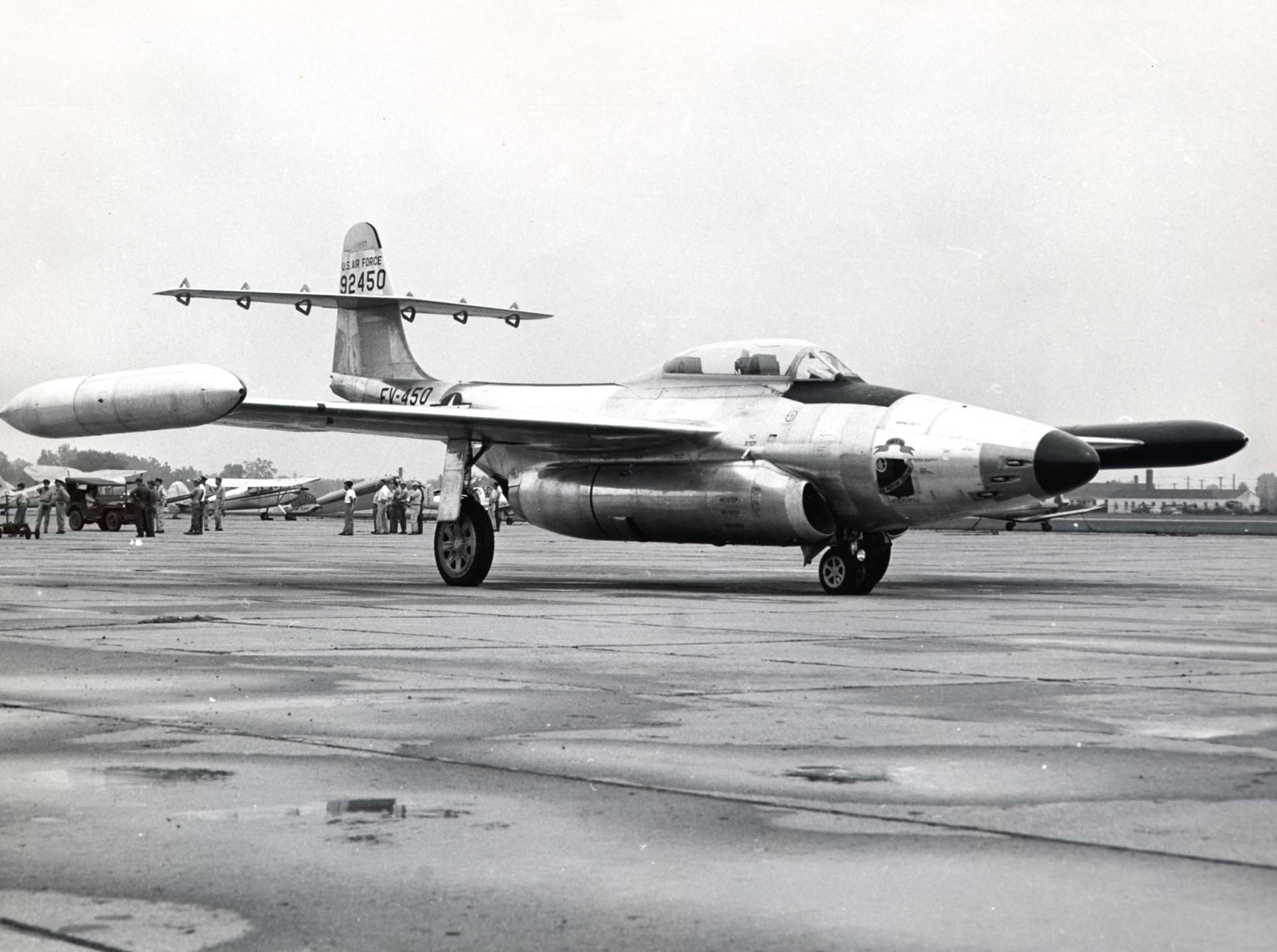
USAF Northrop F-89B Scorpion, 49-2450, of the 3203d Test and Evaluation Group, sits on the ramp at Eglin Air Force Base.

The Main Base public address system, known as the "giant voice", first conceived in 1946 and installed by the communications maintenance division of the Mobile, Alabama Air Material Area, went into operation in February 1950 with preliminary testing completed by 15 February. "The new PA system, situated in the Johnson Hall information booth, resembles an instrument panel from some Buck Roger's [sic] space ship. Two record turn tables are available for the transmission of transcribed bugle calls, and appropriate music. A telephone extension running to the commanding general's office will enable him to make special addresses to Eglin personnal [sic]. The third method of transmitting announcements and emergency bulletins is the microphone connection to the control console. Four amplifier speakers are located in clusters at each of the seven sites. Designed to saturate the area, the speakers are installed at the radio base maintenance shop, guided missiles headquarters, headquarters air proving ground, the motor pool area, the maintenance and supply area, the boat squadron area, in the Plew Heights housing area, and a direct connection to the station hospital's public address system." The system is now used to broadcast lightning warnings after an airman was struck while out on a ramp and killed.

"At Eglin, the 1st Guided Missiles Squadron was assigned air-to-surface missiles and guided bombs (e.g., Tarzon) and the 2nd Guided Missiles Squadron worked with surface-to-surface missiles and aircraft drones. During the first ten months of its existence, the 550th Guided Missiles Wing also continued its predecessor's earlier preparations to support Project Greenhouse with drone aircraft, but additional drones and personnel were assigned to other Air Proving Ground units during this period as well. By January 1950, the Air Proving Ground decided this piecemeal operation ought to be consolidated, and it recommended the establishment of a separate and permanent drone squadron. Personnel from the 2nd Guided Missiles Squadron were subsequently transferred to a new unit – the 3200th Drone Squadron, 3200th Proof Test Group – in May 1950. While the 3200th Drone Squadron remained under the 550th for administrative purposes, its operations were essentially divorced from the 550th's missile activities when the 3200th moved to Auxiliary Field 3. The 2nd Guided Missiles Squadron was placed on inactive status after the transfer, but it was revived at Holloman Air Force Base on 25 October 1950 when the 550th's detachment out there was discontinued. As the 2nd Guided Missiles Squadron Commander at Holloman, Captain John A. Evans inherited the old detachment's manpower and gained 40 airmen from other Wing resources. This brought the Squadron's strength to 17 officers and 114 airmen (out of the 550th's total complement of 201 officers and 816 airmen)."

By March 1950, the 550th Guided Missiles Wing, comprising the 1st and 2nd Guided Missile Squadrons, had replaced the 1st Experimental Guided Missiles Group. The 2nd Guided Missile Squadron, SSM, had 62 pilots manning 14 B-17s, three B-29s, and four F-80 Shooting Stars, yellow-tailed drone aircraft used in the role of testing guided missiles. In 1949, the 2nd GMS tallied 3,052 flight hours without mishap and secured the green and white pennant denoting safety supremacy for USAF B-17 type aircraft for the fourth straight time, gaining permanent possession of the three-starred flag. The 550th GMW played a prominent part in the spring of 1949 in the aerial filming of "Twelve O' Clock High", filmed in part at Eglin AFB. The 2nd GMS flew B-29s in Operation Banshee before switching to B-17s. Seven Flying Fortresses were joined by another seven in November 1948, bringing the squadron complement up to 14 mother and drone Forts. DB-17P, 44-83559, assigned to both the 3200th and 3205th Drone Squadrons at Eglin between 22 June 1950 and May 1958, was dropped from the inventory to become a display aircraft at Patrick AFB, Florida. Flown to Offutt AFB, Nebraska, in May 1959, it is now on exhibit at the Strategic Air and Space Museum, Ashland, Nebraska.

A large hump-backed steel hangar, the "Butler Hangar", 160 feet (49 m) X 130 feet (40 m), transported from Trinidad, was erected at Auxiliary Field 3 between 1 April and ~10 July 1950, by personnel of Company 'C', 806th Aviation Engineering Battalion, under Capt. Samuel M. Cable, and the men of the 550th Guided Missiles Wing. Project Officer was Capt. Clarence A. Ebbert of the Air Proving Ground Command Installations Division. An additional four feet of roof clearance was added to accommodate B-17s in the 21,000-square-foot (2,000 m^{2}) structure. Concrete block buildings, 160 feet (49 m) X 40 feet (12 m), were erected on the flanks of the hangar. Concurrently, the 8,000-foot- (2,400 m)runway was widened to 100 feet (30 m) and additional parking ramps were constructed, with 117,327 cubic yards of dirt excavated. The new ramps and runway expansion consisted of asphalt over a crushed shell base.

In 1950, the Air Force Armament Center was established at Eglin. After the start of the Korean War, test teams moved to the combat theater for testing in actual combat. In 1957, the Air Force combined the Air Proving Ground Command and the Air Force Armament Center to form the Air Proving Ground Center. In 1968, the Air Proving Ground Center was redesignated the Armament Development and Test Center to centralize responsibility for research, development, test and evaluation, and initial acquisition of nonnuclear munitions for the Air Force.

The North American T-28A Trojan arrived at Eglin in mid-June 1950 for suitability tests as an advanced trainer by the 3200th Fighter Test Squadron, with consideration given to its transition, instrument, and gunnery capabilities.

The Fledgling's Roost nursery opened on base on 30 June 1950, staffed by a practical or registered nurse and volunteers, and offered military and civilian families assigned to the Air Proving Ground space for up to 80–90 children, 8 a.m. to midnight, and 3 a.m. on special occasions. The establishment of this project was supported by base commander Col. M. C. Woodbury and the various wives clubs on base.

A 40-lot trailer court opened on base at Postl Point in early July 1950. Proposed in April by Col. M. C. Woodbury, deputy commander of the Air Proving Ground, Col. E. W. Moore, deputy of material, and Lt. L. F. Strain, of budget and fiscal, site preparation was delayed until June by planning for the visit to Eglin by President Harry S Truman on 22 April.

At the outbreak of the Korean war, the only light bomber in the Air Force inventory was the obsolete B-26 Invader, which was marginally effective during daylight but unsuitable for night combat. "After considering a number of proposals and evaluating several aircraft, the Air Proving Ground Command recommended that the United States manufacture the English Electric Canberra jet bomber used in the Royal Air Force. The Air Force Senior Officers Board approved the proposal and recommended that the aircraft go directly into production to provide a night intruder capability at the earliest possible date. The Canberra, designated the B-57 entered the Air Force inventory as an off-the-shelf aircraft without experimental or test models. On 2 March 1951, Air Force Headquarters told the Air Materiel Command—later the Air Force Logistics Command—to negotiate a contract with the Glenn L. Martin Company for the production of 250 B-57 aircraft for use in the Korean War."

The Convair XB-46 concluded its test program at Eglin Air Force Base, arriving from Wright-Patterson Air Force Base, Ohio, on its last flight, in July 1950. Its pneumatic landing gear and brake system was tested under the coldest conditions in the large climatic facility there. Most aircraft used hydraulic or electrical systems. When this concluded in November 1950, the Air Force no longer had need for it, a fact acknowledged in the press as early as August, and on 13 January 1951 the nose section was sent to the U.S. Air Force Museum at Wright-Patterson Air Force Base, Ohio. The rest of the airframe was scrapped 28 February 1952.

Assault transport evaluations were done in the second half of August 1950, involving a modified Fairchild C-82 Packet, the Chase C-122 and C-123 Avitrucs, the Northrop C-125A Raider, and two gliders, the Chase XG-18A and Chase XG-20. Tests included short-field approaches over 50-foot (15 m) obstructions, and operational abilities over rough, unprepared fields and roads with simulated full loads. Initial landing tests were conducted at the municipal airport at Crestview, Florida. " 'The assault transport airplane was developed as a replacement for the glider to be used as the vehicle for delivering ground force troops and equipment into an airhead assault area,' asserted Capt. H. A. Lyon, Eglin project officer. 'We are primarily interested in which airplane does this job best, and determining if the assault transport can match the landing performance of the glider under the worst conditions of rough terrain operation.' "

The first Convair B-36D Peacemakers accepted by the Air Force, in August 1950, were sent to Eglin AFB for testing.

On 12 September 1950, a 26th Bomb Squadron, 11th Bomb Group, 7th Bomb Wing, Eighth Air Force, B-36D, 49-2653 (the first D model in the wing) took part in the first D-model gunnery mission. It was a test evaluation mission flown over the Eglin AFB Gunnery Range, Florida at 24,000 feet (7,300 m). During the mission seven malfunctions of various types occurred before the plane returned to Carswell AFB, Texas. Just over a week later, on 20 September, three B-36Ds (436th, 492d and 9th Bomb Squadrons) of the 7th Bomb Group participated in an exact profile of the war plan. The mission consisted of a night attack on Fort Worth with additional training accomplished by making a simulated bomb run over Birmingham, Alabama. Also, the aircraft conducted a live firing over the Eglin AFB Gunnery Range, Florida, before recovering at Carswell.

In January 1951, control of the armament test center, located at Eglin, was transferred from Air Materiel Command headquarters at Wright-Patterson AFB, Ohio, and assigned to the Air Proving Ground. The APG also reassumed control of the 320_ (?) Chemical and Ordnance Test Group which had squadrons at the Aberdeen Proving Grounds, Maryland, and the Army chemical center at Edgewood, Maryland.

The sole prototype of the Fairchild XC-120 Packplane, 48-330, c/n 10312, a design with a detachable pod for the cargo converted from a C-119B, was tested at Eglin AFB in 1951, although no production orders followed. Project abandoned in 1952.

In 1951, as part of testing of aircraft for Strategic Air Command Escape and Evasion missions, the prototype USAF Douglas YC-47F "Super DC-3" conducted short-field landings with and without a drogue chute as well as RATO (rocket-assisted take-off) tests from rough terrain at Eglin Air Force Base.

"A B-29 assigned to the 581st Air Resupply Squadron, 580th Air Resupply and Communications Wing (ARCW), based at Mountain Home AFB, Idaho, conducted trials at Eglin AFB, during the summer of 1951 to determine if the aircraft could be used to extract personnel utilizing the prototype Personnel Pickup Ground Station extraction system. The test aircraft was modified with a 48-inch diameter opening in place of the aft-belly turret and with an elongated tailhook at the rear of the aircraft. The system was similar to the one adopted in 1952 by Fifth Air Force for the Douglas C-47 Skytrains of the Special Air Missions detachment in Korea. The tests proved technically feasible, but the project was dropped for the B-29 aircraft due to aircraft size and safety considerations of flying it so close to the ground."

"While missile testing continued in 1950 and 1951, the Air Force reorganized the oversight of its research and development program under the auspices of a new major agency – the Air Research and Development Command (ARDC). The new command was activated on 23 January 1950 with Major General David M. Schlatter as its commander. By April 1951, Wright-Patterson's research and development agencies, various laboratories, Edwards Air Force Base and Holloman Air Force Base had been transferred from Air Materiel Command to ARDC. By the end of 1951, ARDC's principal field components included the Wright Air Development Center at Wright-Patterson Air Force Base, the Air Force Flight Test Center at Edwards Air Force Base, the Air Force Armament Test Center at Eglin, and the Air Force Missile Test Center at Patrick Air Force Base (about 15 miles south of Cape Canaveral). The Holloman Air Development Center was established at Holloman Air Force Base in 1952."

On 10 July 1951, a special training mission was flown by B-36D Peacemakers of the 11th Bombardment Wing, 19th Air Division, out of Carswell AFB, Texas, including a high altitude penetration of Eglin AFB, utilizing F-84 fighter escort from the 12th Fighter-Escort Wing, Bergstrom AFB, Texas. On that date, nine B-36s took part escorted by 18 F-84 fighters. The bombers flew out of Carswell south to Port Arthur, Texas. At Port Arthur the bombers picked up their escort fighters and headed east to Florida reaching the Eglin Range. Several F-86 fighters from Eglin AFB intercepted the bombers en route to targets in the area. Completing the scheduled mission the bombers returned to Carswell and the escort fighters recovered at Eglin AFB, returning to Bergstrom AFB the next day.

In the summer of 1951, a B-36 crew on a training mission out of Carswell AFB, Texas, to the Eglin AFB bombing range in the Gulf of Mexico was to drop an unarmed obsolete nuclear gravity bomb, likely a Mark 4, on a water target. Due to past mechanical problems, the bombardier was briefed to open the bomb bay doors at the Initial Point (IP). Although the bomber's bombing navigation radar was still in the navigation mode, the bomb dropped unexpectedly when the bay doors were opened, and the 5,000 lb (2,300 kg). of high explosives in the weapon burst in the air over a non-designated target area. An intensive investigation concluded that a corroded D-2 switch, a hand-held bomb release switch, was found to be in the "closed" position and the bomb was dropped through equipment malfunction.

On 22 August 1951, the 11th Bombardment Wing, 19th Air Division, Carswell AFB, Texas, conducted its first B-36F gunnery test over the Eglin AFB Gunnery Range, Florida. Results of the test were satisfactory.

On 11 October 1951, the 11th Bombardment Wing conducted a unit simulated combat mission out of Carswell AFB using three B-36Fs (9th, 436th and 492nd Bomb Squadrons). The mission was flown in the Eglin AFB Range, Florida. All three aircraft completed the mission as scheduled and returned to Carswell on 12 October.

In 1951–1952, some of the non-combat-capable Boeing B-47A Stratojets (delivered without operational equipment) were assigned to the Air Proving Ground Command, two of which were utilized to test the Emerson A-2 and General Electric A-5 fire-control systems.

On 28 March 1952, 12 7th Bomb Wing B-36s, four each from the 9th, 436th and 492d Bomb Squadrons, flew a unit simulated combat mission in the Eglin AFB Range, Florida. All aircraft recovered at Carswell AFB, Texas, on 29 March.

Building 100 on the flightline is named the Audette Airborne Systems Building. A dedication plaque at the front entrance reads: "In memory of Lieutenant Colonel Leo R. Audette, United States Air Force – in recognition of his contribution in the development of airborne electronics systems – who on 25 August 1952, while a member of this command, gave his life while participating in operations which advanced the development of these systems." His aircraft was F-86D-1-NA Sabre, 50-469.

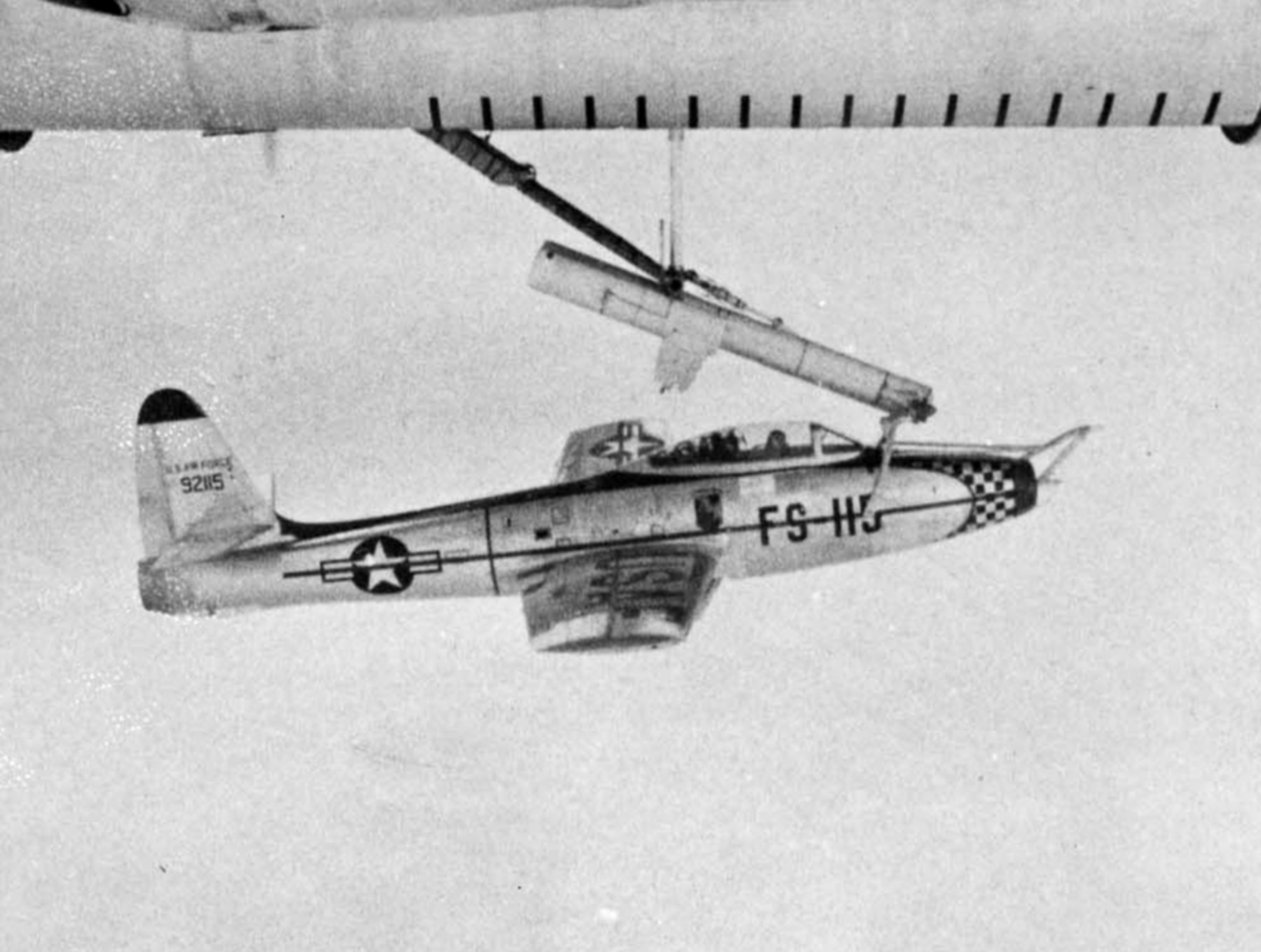
EF-84E Thunderjet on FICON trapeze

In 1953, under the FICON project, the Convair GRB-36F, 49-2707 and Republic EF-84E Thunderjet, 49-2115, was sent to Eglin Air Force Base where 170 airborne launches and retrievals were subsequently performed.

The Piasecki H-21 Workhorse twin-rotor helicopter, which entered service in 1952, underwent operational suitability tests at Eglin AFB from May 1953. On 17 November 1953, a YH-21-PH deployed to Thule AFB, Greenland, from the Air Proving Ground Center, crashed, killing two crew. "The helicopter and a sister craft left Eglin on the first leg of the 4,000 mile flight to Thule AFB on 17 August and arrived there on 14 September. The purpose of the flight was to continue the Air Proving Ground operational suitability testing of the YH-21 which began last May and included tests in Eglin's climatic hanger [sic] as well as temperate or warm weather testing. Arctic testing at Thule Air Force Base was scheduled to be completed by December 1."

In the summer of 1953, the fifth Martin B-57A-MA Canberra, 52-1422, was sent to Eglin for climatic testing.

The first two production B-61A Matador missiles arrived at Eglin in September 1953, under the control of the 6555th Guided Missile Squadron, out of Patrick Air Force Base, Florida, for climatic testing, although instrumentation and pre-test check-outs kept the actual cold-weather tests from beginning until November.

Between 7 October and 21 October 1953, nine tests were conducted of the downward firing ejection seat of the Boeing B-47 Stratojet by the Air Proving Ground, utilizing a TB-47B (a modified B-47B) from the Wright Air Development Center, Wright-Patterson AFB, Ohio, at an altitude of 10,000 feet and various speeds. A second series of tests was also conducted beginning 8 July 1954 after refinements to the system. These tests were depicted in the film On the Threshold of Space, shot at Eglin in 1955.

Bell XGAM-63-BC Rascal, 51-17598, c/n 18, delivered 23 December 1953, was sent to Eglin AFB for testing in the climatic laboratory, then was transferred to the Air Test Center on 19 March 1955.

In 1954, North American F-86F Sabres of the Tactical Air Command's 612th Fighter-Bomber Squadron, assigned at Alexandria AFB, Louisiana, participated in Night Owl, an Air Proving Ground Command project to determine the feasibility of using fighter bombers at night. "The F-86Fs convinced the Night Owl observers of their effectiveness. Moreover, necessary modifications would not affect the aircraft daytime capabilities. Pilot training, if closely monitored, also should present no problem. TAC considered the positive results of Night Owl the greatest single development in night operations since the end of WW II."

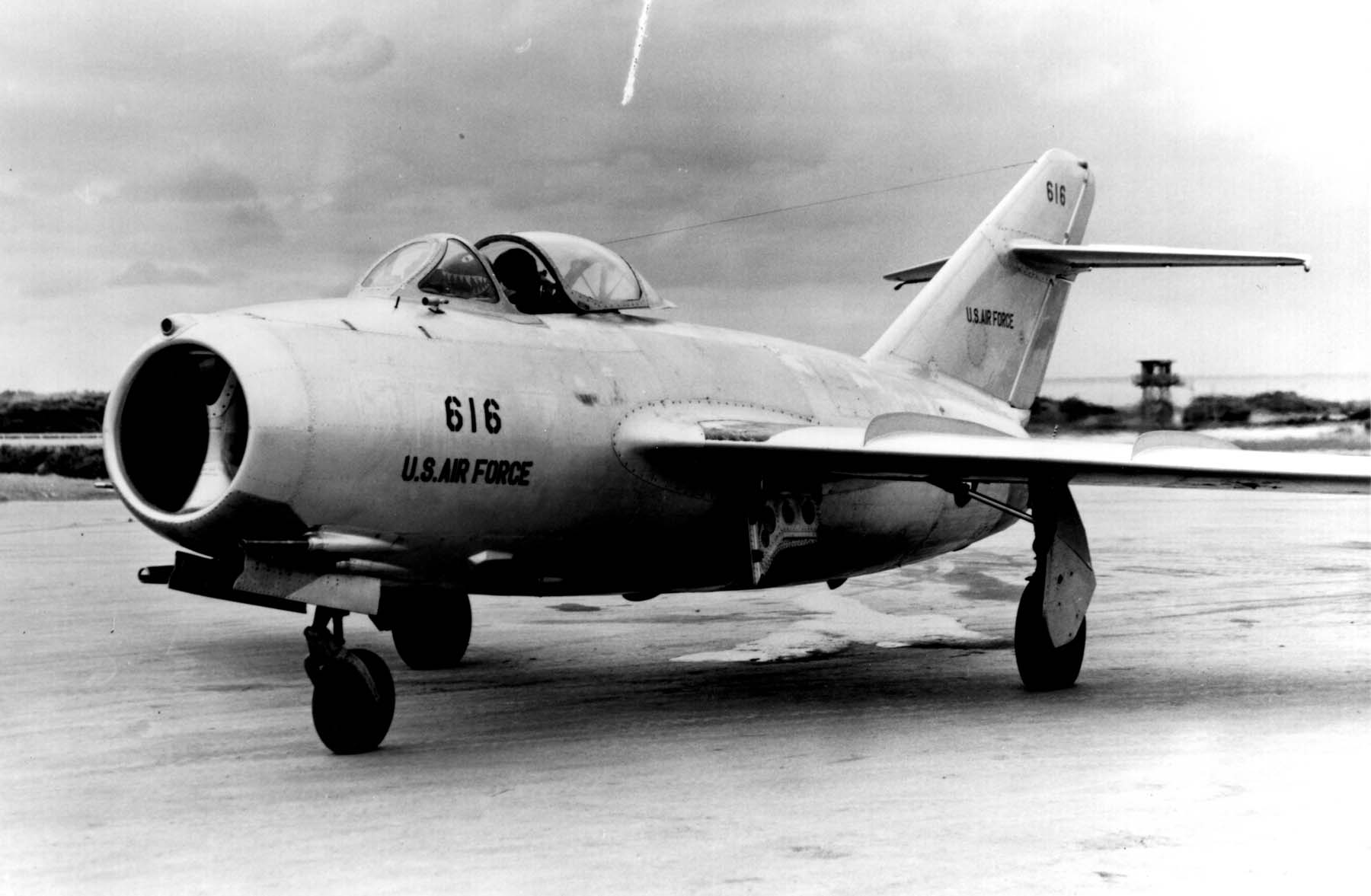
The MiG-15bis delivered by a defecting North Korean pilot that would be tested at Eglin AFB

From March to October 1954, the Korean People's Air Force Mikoyan-Gurevich MiG-15bis was tested at Eglin AFB. Flown to Kimpo Air Base, South Korea, from Sunan Air Base near Pyongyang by defecting North Korean pilot Lt. No Kum-Sok on 21 September 1953, this, the first MiG-15 to fall into Western hands, was flown extensively in comparisons with the B-36, B-47, F-84 and F-86 before returning to Wright-Patterson AFB, Ohio, in October. In February 2004, while a guest at Eglin Air Force Base, No Kum-Sok was offered the opportunity to fly in a MiG-15UTI operated by the Red Star Aviation Museum during the annual convention of the Classic Jet Aircraft Association. After the flight, his first in a MiG since the day he defected, he commented "It is a fast, fast car".

In mid-1954, problems with the Allison J-35 jet engines equipping the first 48 Northrop F-89 Scorpions produced negatively affected the Air Proving Ground test program for the new night fighter, with both the F-89A and F-89B models concurrently undergoing operational suitability tests at Eglin. Modified J-35-A-21A engines would replace the initial versions.

North American F-100A Super Sabre, 53-1538, arrived at Eglin on 15 August 1954 to undergo cold-weather testing in the Climatic Hangar under the auspices of the Wright Air Development Center. The Air Force Operational Test Center of the Air Proving Ground Command at Eglin expected to receive six F-100s soon for operational suitability testing. Also, this date, the Air Proving Ground Center received its first F-105 Thunderchief for armament and fire control system testing.

The 48th Air Rescue Squadron was assigned to Eglin AFB from 10 Jan 1955 to 7 Feb 1969, operating SA-16 Albatrosses (1955–1968), H-19 Chickasaws (1954–1963), SC-54 Rescuemasters (1956–1965), HH-43 Huskies (1963–1965, 1966–1968), HC-130 Hercules (1965–1969), Sikorsky CH-3s (1966–1969), and Sikorsky HH-53s (1966–1969).

A RCAF Avro Canada CF-100 Canuck arrived at Eglin AFB in mid-January 1955 for cold-weather tests in the climatic hangar. A seven-man RCAF team, headed by Flight Lieutenant B. D. Darling, which had previously conducted tests at Namao Air Base, Alberta, are part of the climatic detachment of Central Experimental and Proving Establishment. Tests were to begin in February.

A factory-fresh Convair VC-131D Samaritan arrived at Eglin AFB on 17 February 1955, to join the Air Proving Ground's diversified aircraft inventory. Piloted by Capt. Millard V. C. Cooper, flight instructor of the 3201st Base Flight Squadron, the passenger craft arrived after a seven-hour flight from the plant in San Diego, California.

The 1955 Warner Bros. film The McConnell Story, about Capt. Joseph C. McConnell, Jr., the top American ace of the Korean War, included footage of a Sikorsky H-19 rescuing a downed B-29 crew in that conflict, while under heavy fire. A Chickasaw was furnished by the 48th Air Rescue Squadron, Eglin AFB, for seven days of filming at Alexandria AFB, Louisiana, in February 1955.

Sikorsky YH-5A, 43-46620, one of 26 ordered in 1944, is on display at the National Museum of the United States Air Force at Wright-Patterson AFB near Dayton, Ohio. It was obtained from Eglin Air Force Base, in March 1955.

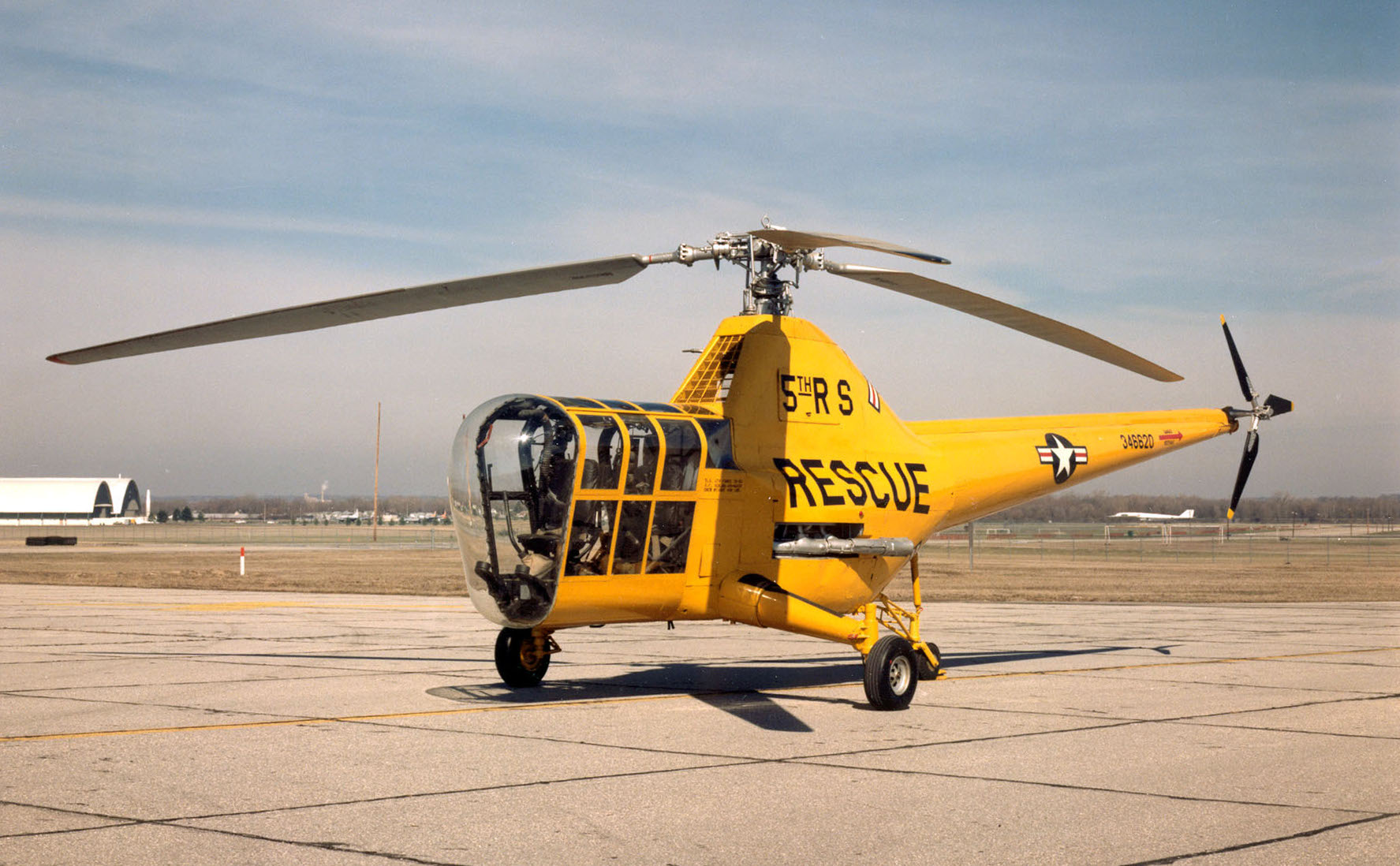
Sikorsky YH-5A preserved at the National Museum of the United States Air Force which was last assigned at Eglin AFB

The 17th Bomb Wing (Light) of the Far East Air Force, based at Miho Air Base, Japan, was reassigned to Tactical Air Command and moved to Hurlburt Field in March 1955, Maj. Gen. Patrick W Timberlake, commander of the Air Proving Ground, announced 9 March 1955. The first 13 B-26 Invaders arrived on the first weekend of April 1955, with 26 more due to arrive over the next few days on the last leg of their reassignment from Japan, via Waco, Texas. All 48 of the wing's bombers were expected by month's end.

The 37th Bomb Squadron, reactivated at Pusan, Korea on 10 May 1952 during the Korean War and equipped with B-26 Invaders, moved to Miho, Japan, from circa 9 October 1954 to circa 19 March 1955, then transferred to Eglin AFB, administratively assigned at Hurlburt Field on 1 April 1955. Reequipped with the B-66B Destroyer in 1956, the unit deployed to ReAF Alconbury, England, on 11 May 1958. Returning to Eglin on 12 May 1958, the unit was inactivated 25 June 1958.

Three QF-80 Shooting Star drones of the 3205th Drone Group, Duke Field, were exposed to close-in effects of the MET (military effects test) of the Operation Teapot nuclear test at the Nevada Test Site on 15 April 1955. Remotely controlled and positioned to receive calculated degrees of blast and heat, the official evaluation of the unmanned drones was described as successful and according to plan by operations officials. Pre-mission estimates expected the loss of two of the drones in the blast. Droppable data collection pods were carried for helicopter recovery. All three drones survived the initial blast effects although two were seriously damaged. One was crash landed by its director aircraft on a dry lake bed near Indian Springs AFB. The second distressed drone was lost in the mountains when it went out of control. The third drone was landed at Indian Springs according to plan.

King Hangar was built in 1955 and named for test pilot, Maj. Lyle R. King, assistant chief of weapons and missiles branch directorate of test operations of the Air Force Armament Center at Eglin, who was killed in the take-off crash of North American EF-86D-5-NA Sabre, 50-516 at Eglin on 22 September 1954. The King Installations Building was dedicated on 5 May 1955. The hangar is considered a historical Korean War-era facility. Bob Hope performed in King Hangar.

In mid-1955, a heavily modified JB-17G Flying Fortress, operated by Pratt & Whitney as an engine testbed for their T34 Turbo Wasp with the huge fifth engine mounted in the nose of the former bomber (Boeing Model 299Z), was present for a base open house on 21 May and made several passes over the flightline with all four reciprocating engines shut down and powered solely by the turboprop. It is unclear whether the design underwent tests at Eglin, however.

Also present at the 21 May 1955 open house was a production model Boeing B-52 Stratofortress, newly arrived from the factory on 9 May, to begin 18 months of operational suitability trials. The bomber arrived for a flypast of the stands as the highlight of the Firepower Demonstration of the 20th Joint Civilian Orientation Conference "at precisely 2:59, four hours and twenty five minutes after it started its 2,220 mile flight from Seattle, Washington."

Consolidated RB-36D-1-CF Peacemaker 44-92090, c/n 87, ordered as part of a production for thirty-four B-36C-1-CF bombers in August 1944; B-36C program cancelled summer of 1948; reordered as B-36B but built as RB-36D; to Convair Aircraft Corporation, Carswell AFB, Fort Worth, Texas, 2 August 1954, for conversion to GRB-36D-1-CF. modified as a carrier for the FICON (FIghter CONveyer) project. Fitted with a trapeze to carry and recover a Republic RF-84K Thunderflash parasite fighter in its bomb bay. To the 3243rd Test Group, 3200th Test Wing, Air Proving Ground Center, Eglin AFB, 2 August 1955. Used for the Phase VII Operational Suitability Test of the FICON system, Operational Test Center, Eglin AFB, through December 1955. Airframe to MASDC 3 July 1956 and scrapped there.

The F-86K Sabre underwent operational evaluation and testing at Eglin in 1955. Six of the all-weather fighter-interceptors, selected by the NATO countries for the air defense rôle, began five months of tests from 15 July. One of these suffered engine failure and explosion on 16 August 1955, crashing NW of Holt, Florida, the pilot successfully bailing out.

From mid-1955, the fire control system for the F-105 Thunderchief was tested at Eglin on a modified RF-84F-1-RE Thunderflash, 51-1835, with bomb drop tests concluded by 1 December 1956. Fifty percent of all drops made on the ranges were within 500 feet CEP, and 75% were within 700 feet CEP. An F-84F was also used for stringent component testing.

During August 1955, three C-123B Providers underwent 60 takeoff and landing tests from unimproved ground with loads from empty to 51,350 lb gross. Landing rolls ranged from 700 to 950 feet, while takeoff rolls ranged from 1080 to 2168 feet. Primary test craft was C-123B-3-FA, 54-559, c/n 20008, which eventually went to the Republic of Vietnam Air Force.

Wright Air Development Center delivered a B-47 with Doppler-augmented K-system to the Air Force Armament Center, in July 1955, for tests aimed principally at the MA-6A bombing system. The test installation also contained provisions for automatic crosshair-laying, semi-automatic fix taking, and dead reckoning navigation. The first flight at Eglin on 22 July 1955 revealed that the Doppler set caused "wander" in the wind values calculated by the D-system, a condition which made the equipment completely unsatisfactory for bombing. General Precision Laboratories went to work on the APN-81, and Sperry on the computers already modified by International Business Machines, in an attempt to resolve the difficulties. By July 1956, the Doppler tie-in was at last working satisfactorily during test flights.

Scenes for the film On the Threshold of Space were shot at Eglin in mid-September 1955, depicting ejection seat tests from a B-47 Stratojet over the Gulf of Mexico. The identity of the B-47 used in the film is unknown as the tail number was covered by a broad black tailband for security reasons of the early Cold War era. Flightline shots were conducted on 19 September with scenes in the Gulf with Eglin crash boats filmed on 20 September.

Testing of the North American F-100C Super Sabre by the Air Force Operational Test Center began in mid-October 1955, with five of six slated for evaluation arriving at Eglin AFB by the end of September. These were undergoing acceptance inspection and having special instrument equipment installed at month's end.

Convair F-102A-15-CO Delta Dagger, 53-1802, arrived at Eglin AFB and entered the climatic laboratory for cold testing under the auspices of the Wright Air Development Center in October 1955. The Air Force Operational Test Center was scheduled to conduct operational suitability tests on the F-102 with Lt. Col. Louis E. Andre as project officer.

On 11 October 1955, 7th Bomb Wing B-36H-1-CF Peacemaker, 50-1085, c/n 197, flew from Carswell AFB, Texas, to Eglin AFB, to take part in a firepower demonstration.

The first of four McDonnell F-101A Voodoos arrived at Eglin AFB on 25 October 1955 for operational suitability tests by the APGC's Air Force Operational Test Center, with the other three due within a few weeks.

The B-52 Stratofortress that arrived at Eglin AFB in May 1955, underwent all-weather testing in the climatic hangar at the base, and then was prepared from November 23 for an "accelerated phase" of the operational suitability testing with the "Arctic Testing Phase", deploying from Eglin AFB to Eielson Air Force Base for tests slated to last until March 1956, including aerial refuelling, polar navigation, and bombing. "Special radio and navigational equipment have been installed in the aircraft to aid in navigation through polar areas where the effect of magnetic variation makes use of magnetic compasses impossible. As with all Air Force 'winterized' aircraft, the upper surfaces of the arctic bound 'Stratofortress' have been painted red to facilitate rescue in the event of an emergency landing. Portions of the towering tail, which is as tall as a five story building, have also been given a coat of red."

Contracts for constructing a new 12,000-foot (3,700 m) runway, 32/14, were awarded in late November 1955 to R. B. Tyler and Hyde Construction Co. of Jackson, Mississippi, whose $3,191,577 bid was the lowest received for the project, said Col. Walter W. Woodard, deputy chief of staff for material for the Air Proving Ground Command. The new runway will connect with the existing north-south runway at its south end, and head northwest from that point. The new runway will be 300 feet (91 m) wide, with a parallel taxiway, 12,000 feet (3,700 m) X 150 feet (46 m). One thousand feet of the new runway at each end will be constructed of 12-inch-thick (300 mm) cement concrete, with the remainder and taxiways of asphaltic concrete. The intermediate area's surface depth will be total four inches (102 mm) combined of asphaltic concrete binder and surface materials. Underlying will be a sub-base of oyster shells seven to eight inches (203 mm) deep, with a 79-foot (24 m) strip in the center of the runway further reinforced by an additional four-inch (102 mm) deep stabilized sub-base. Emergency overruns of 150 feet (46 m) will be at the ends of the new facility. The contract includes clearing and grubbing of 877 acres (3.55 km^{2}) of reservation as well as relocation of a section of the base railroad main line and the ammunition area spur. Some parking aprons and connecting taxiways are also part of the project, which will be supervised for the Mobile District, U.S. Army Corps of Engineers by Resident Engineer James K. Glennon. Work commenced on 15 December 1955. The runway was expected to be completed in January 1957. "The use of barges for delivery of materials is being used extensively. Oyster shell is being dredged from Choctawhatchee Bay and delivered to Garnier Bayou by barge. Gravel is also being delivered by barge to Weekly Bayou on Eglin Main Base. From the above barge delivery points, the materials are then hauled by truck to the construction site. Slag for manufacture of asphaltic concrete is shipped from Birmingham, Ala., and cement concrete will be shipped by rail from the Ideal Cement Company, Mobile, Ala."

The Air Munitions Development Laboratory was reassigned from the Wright Air Development Center at Wright-Patterson AFB, Ohio, to the Air Force Armament Center at Eglin by Headquarters Air Research and Development Command in December 1955. The responsibility for development of guns, bombs, rockets, fuses, guided missile warheads and other related equipment in the armament field was transferred from the Dayton, Ohio facility at this time. Work on nuclear weapons was not included in this mission.

Construction of 500 family homes to be erected S of the Eglin Homes development close to the West Gate, along the Choctawhatchee Bay, E of Ben's Lake, was announced in January 1956 by Major General Robert W. Burns, Air Proving Ground Commander. Authorized by the Department of Defense, the "dwellings will be constructed under the provisions of Title VIII of the National Housing Act and are commonly called 'Capehart housing'. The project will be financed by funds sponsored by the Federal Housing Authority. Title VIII housing differs basically from Wherry Act communities in the financing arrangements. Funds for Wherry projects were provided by a civilian sponsor who owned and operated the development. Title VIII houses are owned by the government but built by funds borrowed from commercial finance sources." Seventeen double units will border the east shore of Ben's Lake S of the present Wherry houses. About two dozen additional units will border the Choctawhatchee Bay E of Ben's Lake. The contract for the construction of the 500 housing units was awarded to the Centex Construction Company of Dallas, Texas, it was announced on Tuesday 5 June 1956. The amount of the contract was $6,433,865. Construction of the project was begun on 27 July 1956, with Maj. Gen. Robert W. Burns, Commander of the Air Proving Ground Command, turning the first spadeful of soil.

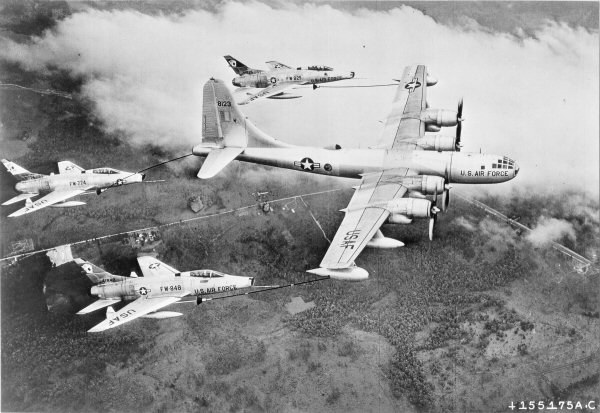
A USAF KB-50D of the Air Proving Ground Command at Eglin AFB, Florida, carrying out the first triple-point refueling operation with three F-100Cs in 1956

The fifth production C-130A Hercules, 53-3133, c/n 3005, was delivered to the 3206th Test Wing at Eglin in January 1956 for testing in the climatic hangar, under the auspices of the Wright Air Development Center, Wright-Patterson AFB, Ohio. Senior project officer for the tests was Maj. Samuel B. Brown, with Capt. Russell M. Bobyna as assistant project officer. J. A. White of the 3206th Test Wing was project engineer. Project officer from the Air Research and Development Command for the climatic hangar testing was 1st Lt. Perry E. Amidon. It was joined in July 1956 by JC-130A, 54-1623, c/n 3010, the tenth production Hercules, for the Air Force Operational Test Center's 3244th Test Group (Transport and Equipment). Ten members of the project team for the operational suitability tests completed familiarization and training courses at Lockheed's Marietta, Georgia plant in April 1956.

The McDonnell F-101A Voodoo began 18 months of operational suitability testing at Eglin AFB from January 1956 by the Air Force Operational Test Center.

On 3 January 1956, GAM-63-BC Rascal, 53-8208, c/n 73, delivered 30 December 1955, arrived at Eglin AFB, transported by a JB-50D Superfortress bomber, for on job training (OJT) of personnel, followed on 1 May 1956 by GAM-63-BC, 53-8209, c/n 74, delivered 30 March 1956, and on 30 November by 53-8230, c/n 95, delivered 29 November, all in the same capacity.

The first operational launch of a Ryan Q-2A Firebee drone at Eglin AFB was made on 14 January 1956, following operational suitability testing by the APGC's Air Force Operational Test Center. Launched in flight from the wing of a Douglas DB-26C Invader, the drone flew a controlled flight pattern over the Eglin water ranges over Gulf of Mexico before deploying a parachute for recovery by a boat of the 3201st Boat Squadron. It was rinsed with fresh water and returned to Eglin for overhaul and preparation for future flights, the first time a Firebee had been recovered from a water area. "Overall command of the mission was in AFOTC's 3241st Test Group (Interceptor), commanded by Colonel Thomas D. DeJarnette. Captain Alexander J. Bobrowski of the 3241st Test Group served as project officer. The drone was controlled under the supervision of Lieutenant Colonel Charles C. Woolwine, Commander of the 3205th Drone Group." Local boaters were warned that Firebee tests would continue over water ranges 32 through 45, Warning Area 151, off Santa Rosa Island, 15 to 60 miles offshore, with drone launches occurring from a point approximately 20 miles offshore.

"A project team from the Air Force Operational Test Center left Eglin Air Force Base Sunday [15 January] for Eielson Air Force Base, Alaska to conduct the Arctic Testing Phase of the testing of the North American F-100C 'Super Sabre'. Major John J. Innis, project officer, and Captain Roscoe B. Tanner, assistant project officer, both of AFOTC's 3243rd Test Group (Fighter) flew the two aircraft to Alaska. A maintenance crew of 17 men from the 3243 Test Squadron (Electronics Maintenance) is accompanying the project to Eielson. Oscar F. Niedermann and Hugh Curtis, technical representatives from North American Aviation and Continental Aircraft Corporations are also part of the teams. During the Arctic test phase, which is expected to last from six weeks to three months, the project team will evaluate the operational suitability of the 'Super Sabre' in sub-zero temperatures. In an effort to determine maintenance problems peculiar to this climate, the ground crews will change the engine in one of the aircraft at 30 degrees below zero. The project will be supported by two transport aircraft, a Douglas C-124 'Globemaster' and a Fairchild C-123B 'Avitruck'. The C-123B, which recently was given operational suitability testing at AFOTC, will also undergo Arctic phase testing while at Eielson. The two F-100Cs, will be integrated into the Alaskan Air Defense system during the duration of the test."

In mid-February 1956, two Convair F-102A Delta Daggers and one Northrop F-89H Scorpion arrived at Eglin AFB to undergo operational suitability testing by the 3241st Test Group (Interceptor) with tests beginning in March 1956. Testing of the F-102A began in the first week of April under senior project officer Maj. Robert T. Goetz. It was expected that the AFOTC would conduct operational suitability tests on the TF-102 proficiency trainer version of the Delta Dagger in the near future.

Two Douglas RB-66B Destroyers arrived at Eglin AFB the first week of March 1956 for operational suitability testing, flown in from Norton AFB, California, by Lt. Col. Henry J. Walsh and Capt. Edward A. Kayworth of the 3245th Test Group of APGC's Air Force Operational Test Center. "These new aircraft include modifications which were made as a result of an operational suitability test performed on the RB-66B last summer and fall. During these tests the RB-66B was used to determine the efficiency of standard U. S. Air Force reconnaissance cameras in high-speed jet aircraft. In performing this mission the plane took part in Exercise 'Sagebrush,' the joint Air Force – Army maneuver held in Louisiana late last year." "Col. Walsh, chief of the Light Bomb Branch of the 3245th Test Group (Bombardment), had as his navigator Lt. James L. Hicks, and as gunner T/Sgt. William W. Brown. Capt. Kayworth, who will act as senior project officer for the tests had Cap. [sic] J. D. Vaughn and T'Sgt. Walter L. Bryant as his crew. All are assigned to the Air Force Operational Test Center, commanded by Col. John A. Hilger."

Two Douglas B-66 Destroyers arrived at Eglin AFB in the last week of March 1956 to undergo operational suitability testing by the 3245th Test Group (Bombardment) of the AFOTC, flown to Eglin from George AFB, California. Maj. Robert R. Hull piloted one plane, with Capt. Archie M. Rackwell as co-pilot, and T/Sgt. D. Richards as gunner. The other was piloted by Lt. Col. Henry J. Walsh, Chief of the Light Bomb Branch of the 3245th Test Group, with Lt. James L. Hicks as co-pilot. Gunner was T/Sgt. Walter L. Bryant. All were assigned to the Air Force Operational Test Center.

In March 1956, four RCAF Avro Canada CF-100 Canucks began tests at Eglin AFB for comparative armament trials, flown by USAF crews. The operational suitability tests, dubbed Project Banana Belt, were carried out by the 3241st Test Group (Interceptor) of the APGC's Air Force Operational Test Center, in conjunction with a project team from the Royal Canadian Air Force. Project officer for Banana Belt is Capt. Philip B. Porter of the 3241st, and Squadron Leader Philip E. Etienne, RFC, of the RCAF's 445th All-Weather Interceptor Squadron, is Officer Commanding of the Canadian detachment. The CF-100 Mark IV first arrived at Eglin AFB in January 1956.

On 7 May 1956, the Air Proving Ground Command hosted a two-hour firepower demonstration at Range 52 before some 5,000 guests representing governments and military units from Latin America, Canada, Cuba, and air attaches of 52 countries, as well as 70 members of the Joint Civilian Orientation Conference. Maj. Gen. Robert W. Burns, commander of APGC, was host. The Thunderbirds performed as part of the event. Flying demonstrations and weapons delivery by F-89 Scorpions, F-94 Starfires, F-100 Super Sabres, and CF-100 Canucks, and the new F-102A Delta Dagger were included, as was an appearance by a Lockheed EC-121. Four F-100s made supersonic runs from 43,000 feet which shook the viewing stands. "Parked aircraft that had outlived their usefulness were attacked by jet fighters using firebombs, cannon and high-velocity rockets." An F-100 demonstrated the new "toss-bombing" technique. A flight of four F-86H Sabres delivered a napalm attack against a concrete simulated factory building. B-47 Stratojets dropped bombs of various sizes and were shown refuelling from aerial tankers. The new B-52 Stratofortress and the B-36 Peacemaker were also demonstrated, with the latter dropping five 100-pound bombs at the shortest interval, "blanketing an area more than 8,000 feet in length."

Three North American F-100D Super Sabres arrived at Eglin AFB at the end of May 1956 for operational suitability testing by the 3243d Test Group, Air Force Operational Test Center. Maj. Daniel D. Hagarty headed the project.

On 26 June 1956, a "1,000-pound bomb was dropped by accident somewhere near the city limits of Niceville Tuesday. The bomb did not explode. First word of the bomb drop was received by City Manager Vernon E. Peeples in a telephone call from Eglin Air Force Base, he informed the city council Tuesday night. Airmen spent the day searching for the bomb but had not located it by nightfall, he added. The bomb was dropped through accident near Field Two and traveled three or four miles in the air, Peeples was informed."

On 26 June 1956, an F-89H Scorpion downed a remote-controlled target QB-17 Flying Fortress over the Eglin water ranges with a Hughes GAR-1 Falcon, "the first time the missile has been employed to destroy a target ship in a simulated air defense environment." Lt. Col. Louis E. Andre, Jr., from the 3241st Test Group, Interceptor, of AFGC and his radar observer, Squadron Leader George T. E. Richards of the Royal Air Force, were credited with the kill. The Falcon is designed to be launched by the F-89H and the F-102A Delta Dagger interceptors. "The missile as well as the Scorpion and the F-102A are presently undergoing operational suitability testing at the Air Force Operational Test Center."

An F-102A Delta Dagger downed a remotely controlled QB-17 Flying Fortress over the Eglin water ranges with a Hughes GAR-1 Falcon on 30 June 1956, announced Air Proving Ground Commander Maj. Gen. Robert W. Burns, the second drone to fall prey to the air-to-air missile within a week at the APGC.

In the last week of June 1956, a new maximum-minimum airspeed indicator was installed in a Boeing B-47 Stratojet to undergo operational suitability testing. "The new instrument, resembling the standard type indicator, differs in that it will determine the stall speed of an aircraft at any specific time. It will also compute the approach speed of the aircraft to aid the pilot in attaining proper speeds for landing. In the past, with the standard type indicator, pilots have had to determine the approach speed of the aircraft through a mental process of totaling the weight of the fuel load and the operating weight of the aircraft to arrive at the gross weight. This was then applied to a chart to determine the proper approach speed of the aircraft. This method, using the standard indicator, left room for error. With the high speed aircraft of today, pilots must be accurate in determining the speed in order to prevent stalling or approaching the landing strip too fast. The new maximum-minimum air speed indicator is designed to prevent errors that might be made by mental calculations of the pilot. The testing of the new indicator is under the supervision of Major Oliver D. Taylor, 3245th Test Group (Bombardment), Air Force Operational Test Center."

Tests of M-112 and M-123 photoflash cartridges, as well as a 165-pound photoflash bomb were conducted over Eglin ranges using Republic RF-84F Thunderflash and Douglas RB-66B Destroyers from 31 July 1956 through the late fall. Air Force Operational Test Center Project Officers for the tests were Capt. Thomas R. Pratt of the 3244th Test Group (Transport and Equipment) and Capt. Robert W. Meade of the 3243d Test Group (Fighter).

In September 1956, B-57E-MA Canberra, 55-4244, was assigned to the Air Force Operational Test Center at the Air Proving Ground Command, Eglin AFB, becoming a JB-57E for test missions. In December 1957, it transferred to the Air Proving Ground Center, Air Research and Development Command, at Eglin, reverting to a B-57E in October 1967, and finally to the Armament Development and Test Center of Air Force Systems Command in November 1968. Retired and dropped from the inventory in December 1969, it was sent as an exhibit to what is now the Strategic Air and Space Museum, Ashland, Nebraska.

On 27 September 1956, one of the first production Lockheed F-104A-LO Starfighters arrived at Eglin AFB for cold-weather tests in the Air Proving Ground Commands' Climatic Projects Laboratory, with testing due to begin in October under the auspices of the Wright Air Development Center, Wright-Patterson AFB, Ohio.

In October and November 1956, a Cinerama motion picture Search for Paradise, directed by Otto Lang, and produced by Lowell Thomas, was filmed in part at Eglin AFB under the working title of Search for Shangri-La. The film "tells the story of a veteran officer, who wants 'out' but finds, after searching the world for a 'Shangrila,' [sic] that the U. S. Air Force is 'it.'"

"Some of the action-packed events captured at Eglin include F-100 'Super Sabres' breaking the sound barrier, in-flight refueling of B-47 'Stratojet' medium bombers, landings and mass fly-bys of the latest operational U. S. Air Force aircraft. Hollywood stunt flyer and combat veteran Paul Mantz, was contracted by Stanley Warner to fly his specially built B-25 in filming a number of aerial sequences. The Cinerama camera can be placed in the nose or tail gunnery slot of the World War II aircraft to film the panorama called for in this latest 'wide-curved' screen production." Release by Stanley Warner, Inc., was expected in the spring of 1957.

For thirty days, beginning 1 November 1956, a combined test of elements of the Air Force Operational Test Center, Air Defense Command, Air Materiel Command, Air Research and Development Command, and Strategic Air Command dubbed Project Plymouth Rock, tested the capabilities of Lockheed RC-121 Warning Stars of the 551st Airborne Early Warning and Control Wing, Otis AFB, Massachusetts. The RC-121s flew picket patterns along the east coast of the United States 24 hours a day while attempting to detect aircraft of the Eglin-based AFOTC playing the part of "enemy" attacks on the boundaries of the U.S. The tests were under the supervision of Senior Project Officer Maj. R. L. Wood of the 3241st Test Group (Interceptor) of the Eglin-based Operational Test Center, with Capt. Phillip B. Porter, Operations Officer, and Maj. A. W. Gramzinski, who collected and analyzed data compiled during the tests. The 3245th Test Group (Bombardment) supplied a Boeing B-47 Stratojet and a Boeing KC-97 Stratofreighter as target aircraft. Other target aircraft were supplied by Strategic Air Command and interceptors by Air Defense Command.

A third QB-17 drone kill was achieved by a Hughes GAR-1 Falcon fired from a F-102A Delta Dagger of the 3201st Test Group (Interceptor), flown by Maj. Robert T. Goetz on 1 November 1956 over the Eglin water ranges. The drone had been previously damaged by an earlier hit during the same mission, fired by Capt. William T. Quirk. Goetz had been credited with one of the two QB-17 kills during June 1956.

Three F-102A Delta Daggers were deployed to Eglin AFB in December 1956 for GAR-1D Falcon missile firing trials. Of 20 GAR-1Ds launched at targets, only one achieved a hit. The Air Force halted GAR-1D production and temporarily removed the weapon from the inventory while deficiencies were corrected, with additional tests in February 1957 rating the missile as satisfactory.

Two Northrop F-89J Scorpions arrived at Eglin AFB in mid-December 1956 from the Northrop Aircraft Corporation facility at Palmdale, California to undergo employment and suitability testing by the 3241st Test Group (Interceptor) of the AFOTC. The first of the two aircraft to arrive was piloted by Capt. Edward J. Slown with Capt. Clayton D. Modeas radar observer. The other 'J' was flown by Lt. Col. Max E. Wolfson with Capt. Phillip B. Porter as radar observer. "Senior Project Officer for testing the F-89J is Capt. Daniel Andre of the 3241st Test group (Interceptor)."

Bids for a new control tower to be located near the southwest end of the old abandoned NE-SW runway at Eglin AFB were announced by Col. Walter W. Woodward, Deputy Chief of Staff for Material, Air Proving Ground Command, to be received by the Mobile District Office, Corps of Engineers, by 15 January 1957. The site is ~2,000 feet N of the center line of the new runway and 2,000 feet W of the existing runway. The height of the observation deck from the ground will be 62 feet, two inches. It was anticipated that the new tower would be completed in late summer or early fall.

In 1957, the Okaloosa County Air Terminal opened on Eglin Air Force Base in building 89 with 3 personnel (Airport Manager, Security and Administrative Support). Southern Airways was the only air carrier, from 3 September, operating Douglas DC-3s, and, from 1961, Martin 4-0-4s. The last Southern DC-3 was retired on 31 July 1967. The 4-0-4s would serve Eglin until 1973. The airport code of VPS was assigned for the traditional identifier of Valparaiso Airport.

Work began on new missile launching facilities on Santa Rosa Island at site A-15, south of Hurlburt Field, in March 1957, the planning for which dated to October 1955, to accommodate the testing of the new IM-99 Bomarc surface-to-air missile. By 1958 the site hosted missile ground testing and personnel training facilities by the 4751st Air Defense Missile Wing of the Air Defense Command, activated on 15 January 1958 (another source gives the date as 27 February 1958) to supplement Bomarc testing done at Patrick AFB, Florida. Launchers were constructed so that Bomarcs could be fired into what became known as the Eglin Gulf Test Range. The first Santa Rosa Bomarc was launched 15 January 1959. Launch tests were conducted against QF-80s, QB-47H Stratojets and KDBU (Regulus II) drones.

In the last week of March 1957, a Douglas C-133A Cargomaster arrived at the Air Proving Ground Command "to undergo adverse weather testing in the Air Force Operational Test Center's Climatic Hangar." Project Officer for the climatic testing was Capt. J. C. Shive, from the Wright Air Development Center, Wright-Patterson AFB, Ohio. The Air Force Operational Test Center was scheduled to conduct employment and suitability tests starting in October 1957, headed by Maj. James M. Myers of the 3244th Test Group (Transport and Equipment), to be run in the Military Air Transport Service environment. The project team was slated to make a number of trans-Atlantic flights in the C-133A from Dover AFB, Delaware, to determine the suitability of the Cargomaster to haul heavy cargo loads over long distances.

The week of 1 April 1957 a Lockheed C-130 Hercules from the Air Force Operational Test Center at Eglin Air Force Base became the first turbo-prop aircraft to carry U.S. mail across the Atlantic. The C-130 was on its way to Evreux, France, where it was to be put through another phase of Employment and Suitability Testing by AFOTC. Stopping at Dover, Delaware, on the first leg of the Atlantic crossing, the Hercules took on 4,800 pounds of mail for servicemen overseas.

In May 1957, four F-102 Delta Dagger squadrons participated in Operation Fast Draw at Eglin AFB for further evaluation of the interceptor and its MG-10 fire control system. The GAR-1D Falcon performance once again rated satisfactory, validating the F-102’s capability for continental air defense. As a result, the GAR-1D re-entered service in mid-1958.

In March 1957, the last F-51 Mustang in USAF service, F-51D-30-NA, 44-74936, retired to the Air Force Central Museum from the West Virginia Air National Guard in late 1956, was pulled out of "mothballs" and flown to Eglin AFB to "appear in the Aerial Firepower Demonstration to be conducted by the Air Proving Ground Command on May 6. The May 6 demonstration will celebrate the Golden Anniversary of the U. S. Air Force. The F-51 will participate in a pageant of U. S. airpower which will highlight the developments in combat aircraft from the open-cockpit by-planes [sic] of World War I to the ultrasonic fighters of the present. The F-51 was flown to Eglin from the Air Force Museum in Dayton, Ohio, by Lt. Col. Walter A. Rosenfield, Jr. It will be flown in the Aerial Firepower Demonstration by Capt. Ralph P. Clark, with Major George N. Metcalf as an alternate pilot. The Crew Chief for the 'Mustang' is Technical Sergeant Harry P. Grizzle. Col. Rosenfield, Capt. Clark, and Sgt. Grizzle are members of the Air Force Operational Test Center at Eglin, and Major Metcalf is assigned to Air Proving Ground Headquarters. All have had prior experience with the F-51."

A 7th Bomb Wing B-36 was flown to Eglin AFB, on 24 May 1957 for static display.

After ten years of service, primarily for electronic testing, the first B-50A-1-BO Superfortress, 46-002, reclassified as an EB-50A in March 1949, and then as a JB-50A in January 1956 for testing of special instrumentation, concluded its career by verifying a stellar monitoring inertial bombing system and was then salvaged at Eglin on 12 July 1957.

The Low Altitude Bombing System (LABS), or toss bombing, tactic was first made public in front of a crowd of 3,000 including 11 state governors on 7 May 1957 at Eglin AFB, when a B–47 Stratojet entered its bombing run at low altitude, pulled up sharply (3.5 g) into a half loop, releasing its bomb under computer control at a predetermined point in its climb, then executed a half roll, completing a maneuver similar to an Immelmann turn or Half Cuban Eight. The bomb continued upward for some time in a high arc before falling on a target which was a considerable distance from its point of release. In the meantime, the maneuver had allowed the bomber to change direction and distance itself from the target. The development of this system at Eglin dated to at least mid-1955 under Project Back Breaker. The unintended consequence of this tactic would be a series of crashes by B-47s in early 1958 caused by stress-induced cracks which caused the bombers to shed their wings. A fleet-wide inspection and repair program known as Milk Bottle was begun in May 1958 which led to no fewer than nine Technical Orders, with most aircraft cycled through the program by October 1958.

From 5 to 10 October 1957, one 7th Bomb Wing B-36 participated in a firepower demonstration at Eglin AFB, Florida.

The first inventory-accepted production GAM-63 Rascal missile was assigned to Eglin AFB on 30 October 1957, with Category II testing running into mid-1958. It was delivered from the Bell Aircraft Company plant at Wheatfield, New York, on board a JB-50D Superfortress modified as a Rascal transporter. Two bombers were used in this capacity, 48-069 and 48–126. Despite a cover article and glowing account in the July 1958 issue of Popular Science magazine (Vol. 173, No. 1) of a recent successful test by a DB-47 which flew from Eglin to Holloman AFB, New Mexico, to launch the Rascal, this was the exception. Out of 65 tests, all others either were cancelled or were outright failures.

The Eglin Aero Club was founded in 1958.

In 1958, the 3215th Drone Squadron from Eglin's Air Proving Ground Center deployed to Cape Canaveral to provide the target drones for the IM-99 Bomarc test program. On 5 December 1958, the squadron was discontinued, but it was succeeded by the 3205th Drone Group, Detachment #1, which continued flying drone targets for BOMARC tests well into 1959. Once the IM-99A portion of the program was completed, drones were no longer required. Detachment #1 departed for Eglin on 8 June 1959.

Unreported at the time, the military planned a live nuclear test in the Gulf of Mexico in mid-1958 involving Nike Hercules and Genie missiles. "The Pentagon scheduled a Nike-Hercules operational exercise and a second full-fledged Genie test to take place over the Gulf of Mexico in 1958. However, President Eisenhower halted the operation a week before it occurred following two Oval Office meetings with senior military and civilian officials. From the outset, the AEC opposed the operation. AEC Chairman Lewis Strauss 'questioned the possible adverse public reaction'" if the operation went ahead. Nonetheless, the Army prepared to have a Nike-Hercules battery at Eglin Air Force Base's Santa Rosa Island launch two missiles over the Gulf, each with different version of the W-31 nuclear charge, at a formation of three obsolete Air Force F-80 fighters converted into drones. In the same exercise, the Air Force intended to have interceptors fire Genies at other unmanned aircraft. Both the Army and Air Force were to make use of airspace '25 nautical miles (46 km) horizontal distance from the nearest populated area' which had been a military training area for years and was routinely used to test Air Force weapons (albeit never nuclear arms). On June 27, 1958, Lewis Strauss, Secretary of State John Foster Dulles and others discussed the Eglin operation with President Eisenhower. Strauss emphasized his belief that what he considered unnecessary tests of production nuclear arms might imperil future test activities he thought which were central to the AEC's mission. Dulles and his deputy, Christian Herter, expressed concern that neighboring nations might react poorly to the operation. Eisenhower decided that if the governments of Cuba or Mexico objected, 'the matter would have to be reconsidered.' A month later, as test preparations proceeded, another White House meeting was convened. Dulles reported to Eisenhower that 'consultations' with Cuba and Mexico led him 'to recommend strongly' that the nuclear operation be moved to the Pacific. The president then 'approved transfer or cancellation' of the operation but requested 'some study of some combination of activities to accomplish the same objectives.' While the military moved to continue the operation in Florida with conventional rounds, Public Health Service officials contacted their state-level counterparts, informed them of the nuclear test halt, expressed appreciation for 'complete cooperation,' and asked them to 'forget our activities in the area.' The request was heeded. There is no evidence that the 1958 test arrangements became known at the time."

The eleventh YB-58A-1-CF Hustler, 55-670, c/n 11, first flown on 26 June 1958, was placed in the climatic test chamber at Eglin AFB on 7 August 1958 and removed in September 1958.

The first F-105B Thunderchiefs to reach an operational unit were delivered to the 335th Tactical Fighter Squadron of the Tactical Air Command's 4th Fighter Wing at Eglin in August 1958.

On 1 December 1958, the 4135th Strategic Wing of the Second Air Force, Strategic Air Command, flying the B-52 Stratofortress and KC-135 Stratotanker, was assigned to Eglin. The wing was reassigned to the Eighth Air Force, 822nd Air Division on 1 January 1959. A five-pronged concrete Christmas-tree alert ramp was constructed at the west end of runway 32/14 as Taxiway 3 to accommodate the eight-engined bombers. All the buildings of the SAC Alert area were erected between 1958 and 1961. The Crew Readiness, or "Alert" Building, was completed and in use by the end of January 1960. Buildings 1343, 1344 and 1345 were built as B-52 service nose bays, while 1339 was a fuel system "nose dock", so-named because only the nose and wings fit inside. This fuel cell maintenance hangar would be demolished on 13 December 2011 by general contractors, the Army Corps of Engineers, and base civil engineers to be replaced by an F-35 fuel cell maintenance hangar with three aircraft bays.

From the late 1940s through the mid-1960s, Eglin played host to annual Fire Power Demonstrations on its extensive test ranges. President Harry S Truman attended one such event on 22 May 1950, as did President John F. Kennedy on 4 May 1962. RB-36D-1-CO Peacemaker, 44-92088, was demonstrated at Eglin for Truman's visit.

In the mid-late 1950s, the fifth and last B-66A-DL Destroyer all-weather photo reconnaissance variant, 52-2832, modified to a JRB-66A, served at Eglin with the 3206th Test Wing and the 3201st Air Base Wing. It would be transferred to the U.S. Navy at Davis-Monthan AFB, Arizona, on 20 February 1960.

Category II testing of the F-101B Voodoo was completed at Eglin on 15 March 1959.

On 23 April 1959, a B-52 launched the first flight test of a prototype GAM-77 Hound Dog A missile at Eglin AFB.

Testing of the General Electric APN-115 navigational radar system took place at Eglin from mid-1959 utilizing a JRB-57 Canberra.

GAR-4A Falcon missile trials with F-106 Delta Darts were conducted at Eglin AFB in June and July 1959.

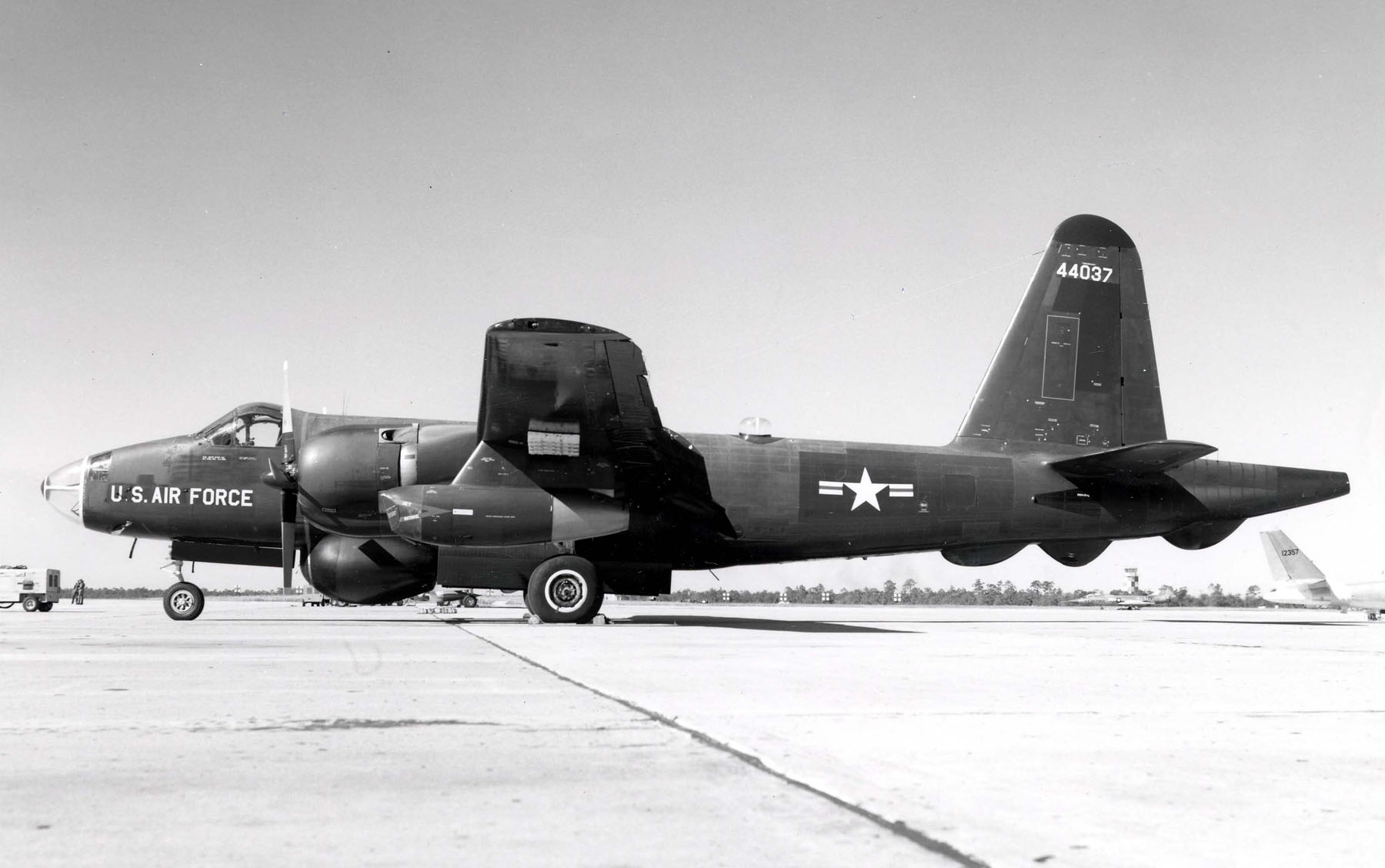
RB-69A, 54-4037, of the CIA in USAF markings on the Eglin AFB flightline, following a ferry flight from the Lockheed plant at Burbank, California.

Beginning 1 August 1959, P2V-7U Neptune, BuNo 135612, c/n 7047, as an RB-69A, 54-4037, acquired by the Central Intelligence Agency under Project Cherry, was sent to Eglin AFB for testing aircraft performance at low level and under adverse conditions. A CIA document indicates that 200 hours of testing were planned, including tests with the Skyhook system. The names of two agency personnel involved in the tests were redacted. For a time in the 1960s–1970s, the CIA had "front" offices in Shalimar, Florida. This office may have been involved as a test project office for the Lockheed U-2, with whom Fort Walton Beach resident, World War II exile Polish pilot, and CIA officer, Ksawery Wyrożemski was involved.

The first operational Strategic Air Command GAM-77 Hound Dog A missile, 59-2794, arrived at Eglin AFB in December 1959 to equip the 4135th Strategic Wing, operating B-52G Stratofortresses out of the base.

== The 1960s ==
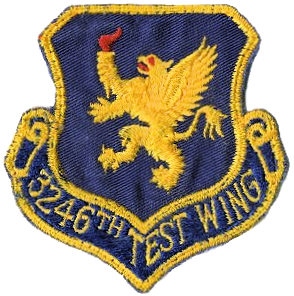
3246th Test Wing Emblem

On 14 January 1960, Eglin AFB conducted the first test launch of a rocket-borne transmitter.

The first production Republic F-105D Thunderchief, F-105D-1-RE, 58-1146, c/n D-1, began an intensive flight test program at Eglin during the last week of January 1960. It arrived from Farmingdale, New York on 22 January, flown by Republic test pilot Don Seaver. The first Air Proving Ground Command pilot to fly the airframe was Maj. Kenneth L. Skeen, project pilot for the APGC's Directorate of Tactical Systems Test.

The first GAM-77 Hound Dog missile assigned to the Strategic Air Command was carried aloft for the first time on 29 January 1960, aboard a B-52G-75-BW Stratofortress, 57-6472, c/n 464177, of 4135th Strategic Wing, commanded by Capt. Jay L. McDonald. The strategic missile was carried on the port underwing pylon during the flight that lasted more than four hours. The Eglin crew made the first Air Force launch of the type at 1950 hrs., over the Atlantic Missile Range, all previous launches having been made by contractor crews flying B-52s. A second Hound Dog was launched several hours later. On board the B-52 during the two launches was Gen. A. J. Russell, Commander of the 822d Air Division with headquarters at Turner Air Force Base, Georgia. Directing the mission from the Missile Control Center at Cape Canaveral was Lt. Col. William T. Wilborn, Test and Evaluation Director for the SAC Project Office at Eglin. Another operational test of the GAM-77 Hound Dog took place over the Eglin water range on 31 March 1960 when a B-52G of the 4135th Strategic Wing, commanded by Capt. Jay L. McDonald, launched the missile from a point near Tampa, Florida, at 1347 hrs. CST, which then flew several hundred miles NW to hit a target in the Gulf of Mexico off the northwest Florida coast. This test followed a series of successful flights over the Atlantic Missile Range at Cape Canaveral as well as on the test ranges of Eglin.

An IM-99A Bomarc was fired from Santa Rosa Island by the 4751st Air Defense Missile Wing at 1503 hrs., 26 February 1960, targeting a QF-80 drone flying above 30,000 feet over the Eglin Gulf Test Range. "A spokesman for the Wright Air Development Division, which manages the Bomarc program for the Air Research and Development Command said the objective in the firing was to test some recently modified missile supported equipment."

The first GAM-72 Quails began to join the 4135th Strategic Wing at Eglin AFB on 27 February 1960.

On 11 April 1960, a 4135th Strategic Wing B-52 crew, commanded by Capt. Jay L. McDonald, took off from Eglin AFB, carrying two operational Hound Dogs, made a 20-hour, 30-minute flight to the North Pole and back, and on 12 April, launched a Hound Dog missile over the Atlantic Missile Range. This test, called Operation Blue Nose, verified the ability of the B-52 and missile to operate in temperatures as low as 75 degrees below zero. North American Aviation, Inc., Space And Information Systems Division / Strategic Air Command documentary "Operation Blue Nose", written and directed by Ernest Frankel.

Testing continued with the Bomarc B model. Designated the IM-99B, this missile underwent its inaugural service test on 13 April 1960.

In May 1960, the obsolete control tower at Eglin's Main base, a glass-enclosed cab, 15 feet square, supported by steel legs about 50 feet long, with steel cross-bracing, ladders and hand rails, was offered for sale to the highest bidder, announced by the U.S. Army District Engineer at Mobile, Alabama. The structure, offered on an as-is, where-is basis, was to be removed from the site not later than August 12.

The final flight in the Category II testing of the F-105B Thunderchief was flown by members of the 335th Tactical Fighter Squadron at Eglin AFB on 31 May 1960. Lt. Col. Robert R. Scott, Commander of the 335th, stated that the year-long tests were completed successfully and on schedule. In Cat II testing, the aircraft, its subsystems and components are evaluated under closely simulated tactical conditions. The F-105B then moved into Category III testing under actual combat conditions by the Tactical Air Command. The 335th TFS remained at Eglin for similar testing of the F-105D.

On 8 June 1960, the first SAC launch of an GAM-72 Quail decoy was made by a B-52G of the 4135th Strategic Wing, operating out of Eglin.

On 14 June 1960, Air Force Secretary Dudley C. Sharp announced in Washington, D.C., that testing and development of the Douglas GAM-87 Skybolt air-to-surface ballistic missile had been assigned to Eglin AFB. "While preliminary activity will start immediately at Eglin on the Sky Bolt [sic] project, the program is not expected to reach full scale for at least a year or two." Ultimately, however, a series of test failures and the development of submarine-launched ballistic missiles (SLBMs) eventually leads to its cancellation in December 1962.

A Nike-Asp sounding rocket was launched from Eglin Air Force Base on 27 June 1960 at 1410 hrs. with an X-ray detector on board to measure ambient electronic and ionic fields, reaching an altitude of 160 miles, but failed to return any useful data.

From July 1960, a Canadair CP-107 Argus of the Royal Canadian Air Force underwent hot weather testing at Eglin AFB. "Since the Canadian climate is comparatively cool, even in mid-summer, a team of 35 RCAF officers and airmen have come to Eglin for six weeks to evaluate the performance of their four-engined Argus patrol craft in a hot-weather environment. Squadron Leader Garnet W. Ovans pointed out they could have tested the Argus in a much warmer location, 'but we picked Eglin because it also had the necessary humidity range, and especially because of the extensive testing facilities here. The APGC project officer for the test of the Argus is Major Charles E. Dougan, of the Directorate of Strategic Systems Test. While at Eglin, the 35-man RCAF crew will collect high-temperature performance data on the Argus, including fuel consumption rates, takeoff and landing distances, maintenance techniques, and functional checks of the armament systems."

The first production GAM-72 Quail missile was delivered to the 4135th Strategic Wing at Eglin on 13 September 1960. Initial operational capability was reached on February 1, 1961, when the first squadron of the 4135th Strategic Wing was equipped with the GAM-72A.

The Development Projects Division, the Central Intelligence Agency's air arm, operated out of Eglin in support of Operation Pluto, the ill-fated Bay of Pigs Invasion, in 1960-1961. A temporary C-54 Skymaster unit, the 1045th Operational Evaluation and Training Group, Headquarters Command, Eglin AFB, as the Air Force designated it, but which was a DPD operation, was temporarily based at Eglin's Auxiliary Field Three (Duke Field) from late 1960 to June/July 1961. “There was a total of about 20 Polish airmen at Eglin at the time, all of them 'employed' by Lockheed, so there should be enough of them to form at least two crews.” The DPD operated independently of "the organizational structure of the project, in which it had a vital, central role, including air drops to the underground, training Cuban pilots, operation of air bases, the immense logistical problems of transporting the Cuban volunteers from Florida to Guatemala, and the procuring and servicing of the military planes."

On 16 December 1960, the Semi Automatic Ground Environment (SAGE) facility at Gunter AFS, Alabama, controlled two BOMARC-B missiles launched from Eglin AFB, and directed their interception of a QB-47 drone flying at 500 mph (800 km/h) at 30,000 feet (9,100 m).

Category II testing of the instrument displays, fire-control and navigation systems of the F-105D Thunderchief was conducted at Eglin between 26 December 1960 and 31 October 1961 by the 335th Tactical Fighter Squadron.

In 1961, Southern Airways began acquiring 22 40-seat Martin 4-0-4s from Eastern Airlines to augment its DC-3 fleet.

One squadron of the B-52G equipped 4135th Strategic Wing at Eglin was declared Operational with the Quail missile, by SAC Headquarters on 1 February 1961, the first B-52 unit to obtain this status.

In an experiment conducted at Eglin AFB, on 23 February 1961, the direct measurement of atmospheric densities between the altitudes of 70 miles (110 km) and 130 miles (210 km) was accomplished for the first time.

On 8 March 1961, the first launch of an Astrobee 1500 rocket took place at 17:53 GMT, from an Eglin site, on an ionosphere mission – apogee was 267 miles (431 km).

In 1961, four Fiat G.91s were delivered to the U.S. aboard Douglas C-124s for evaluation. Two Two G.91R-1's were placed at the disposal of technicians of the U.S. Army at Fort Rucker, Alabama, and two G.91R-3's were delivered to the U.S. Air Force at Kirtland Air Force Base, New Mexico. One G.91R-3 was sent to the climatic laboratory at Eglin for a series of tests. Instrumentation was installed on the aircraft to record all the information related to the airframe and the engine.

On 17 August 1961, the BOMARC-B missile completed a critical profile flight by destroying a QB-47 drone at a minimum range of 50 nautical miles (93 km) and 5,000 feet (1,500 m) in altitude.

On 19 September 1961, a Bomarc B launched from Eglin, and controlled from a Semi Automatic Ground Environment (SAGE) facility at Gunter AFS, Alabama, intercepted a supersonic Regulus II drone off the Florida coast at a seven-mile (11 km) altitude, 250 miles (400 km) from the launchpoint. The Bomarc successfully executed a 180-degree turn to make the intercept. Another source lists the launch date as 19 September 1962.

Combat Evaluation Launches of the GAM-77 Hound Dog began at Eglin AFB on 18 December 1961, by elements of the B-52G equipped 4241st Strategic Wing at Seymour Johnson AFB, North Carolina.

In early 1962, Eglin was considered as one of the possible launch sites for the Little Joe II ballistics test for the Apollo program, although the U.S. Army's White Sands Missile Range was eventually selected in late spring due, in part, to the simplified recovery on a land versus a water range.

The ninth F-102A Delta Dagger, F-102A-15-CO, 53-1799, one of only 25 short-tail models built, was retired at Eglin in 1962 and placed on display in Fort Walton Beach. Donated back to the infant Armaments Museum in 1975, it was found to be too badly corroded after 13 years in Gulf sea air for preservation.

Between 22 January and 2 March 1962, the U.S. Army Quartermaster Research and Engineering Command conducted a human factors study of QMC clothing and equipment during cold weather tests of the Pershing missile in the Climatic Laboratory at Eglin AFB. Quartermaster participation in the test was at the request of the Army Ordnance Missile Command, with compatibility tests conducted at temperatures of 0, −25, −45, and −65 °F (−54 °C). The artillery test team consisted of a commanding officer and 15 enlisted men, all from the Army Ordnance Missile Command, Redstone Arsenal, Alabama.

In the early 1960s, the Air Force investigated the conversion of the Cessna T-37 jet-powered primary trainer for counterinsurgency missions. The project was intended to provide an inexpensive aircraft for the U.S. export market. In 1962 two T-37Bs, 62-5950 and 62-5951 were modified and tested at Eglin Air Force Base. The aircraft retained the T-37's Continental J69 engines, but since gross weight increased to accommodate the ordnance and attack avionics, the aircraft was underpowered and performed poorly.

The USAF Special Air Warfare Center was activated 27 April 1962, with the 1st Combat Applications Group (CAG) organized as a combat systems development and test agency under the SAWC. The 1st CAG concentrated on testing and evaluation of primarily short-term projects which might improve Air Force counter-insurgency (COIN) operations. The Special Air Warfare Center, located at Hurlburt Field, undertook to develop tactical air doctrine while training crews for special air warfare in places like Southeast Asia. By mid-1963, SAW groups were in Vietnam and Panama.

On 4 May 1962, President John F. Kennedy visited Eglin for an airpower tour. The 4080th Strategic Reconnaissance Wing, Laughlin AFB, Texas, dispatched a Lockheed U-2A, piloted by Rudolf Anderson for static display. Although Kennedy's motorcade only drove past the spy plane without stopping, Anderson later briefed the president, accompanied by Generals Curtis E. LeMay, Thomas S. Power, and Secretary of the Air Force Eugene M. Zuckert, on the spy plane's capabilities. Also on display for the president's firepower demonstration was B-58A-10-CF Hustler, 59-2460, of the 43d Bombardment Wing. Also on display for the presidential visit was F-105B-20-RE Thunderchief, 57-5836, fully loaded with 26 X 500 lb. bombs. Footage of the president's arrival.

After a three-year testing program, on 10 May 1962, a U.S. Air Force Bomarc A launched from Eglin AFB, Fla., intercepted a QF-104 Starfighter drone 150 miles (240 km) away. 1365th Photo Squadron report "Starfighter To Be Drone", Eglin AFB, Florida, 1961.

An RM-86 Exos sounding rocket was successfully launched over the Eglin Gulf Test Range to an apogee of 227 miles (365 kilometres) on 3 August 1962 for the Air Force Cambridge Research Laboratories. The mission was described as Bipolar Probe ionospheric research.

On 19 September 1962, a Bomarc B launched from Eglin, and controlled from Gunter AFB, Alabama, intercepted a supersonic Regulus II drone at a seven-mile (11 km) altitude, 250 miles (400 km) from the launchpoint. The Bomarc successfully executed a 180-degree turn to make the intercept.

During the Cuban Missile Crisis in October 1962, F-104C Starfighters of the 479th Tactical Fighter Wing from George AFB, California, were deployed to Eglin as part of the immense build up of military strength and material in the State of Florida in preparation for possible military action. The 4135th Strategic Wing, Strategic Air Command, Alert crews at Eglin were placed on airborne alert priority with two Eglin B-52s on 24-hour flights within cruising range of Russia. Flights of 24 hours, more than double the usual ten-hour missions, were refueled by KC-135 tankers. Following the end of the crisis, the SAC crews returned to their usual routines. Ready Force, A Company, of the 82d Airborne Division, U.S. Army, was deployed to Eglin from Fort Benning, Georgia, for a possible jump into Havana to seize the airport.

Testing of specialized U.S. Navy equipment intended for use in the unsuccessful Operation Coldfeet salvage of Soviet drift station equipment (as a Navy undertaking) in the Arctic in late 1962-early 1963 was conducted in the Climatic Laboratory post-September. Eventually a CIA proprietary company carried out the mission in late May-early June 1963.

Minnesota Honeywell Corporation conducted flight tests on an inertial guidance sub-system for the later-cancelled X-20 Dyna-Soar project at the base utilizing an NF-101B Voodoo, beginning in January 1963, and completed by August 1963. QB-47E Stratojets and QF-104A Starfighters were operated by the 3205th Drone Director Group through the late 1960s (QB-47s) in support of such programs as the testing of the IM-99 Bomarc interceptor missile, and into the 1970s (QF-104s).

The USAF Tactical Air Warfare Center was activated on 1 November 1963. It would be re-designated as the USAF Air Warfare Center on 1 October 1991.

Three SC-54 Rescuemasters and an HU-16 Albatross of the 48th Rescue Squadron deployed from Eglin to Grand Turk Island with a contingent of some 40 squadron personnel supporting four pararescuemen who jumped from SC-54s to recover four camera cassettes, and sight and mark a fifth, from the launch of Apollo mission SA-5 with launch vehicle AS-105 at 1625 hrs. GMT, 29 January 1964, the first launch of a Block II Apollo with a live second stage. Two other Eglin-based HU-16s were flown to Patrick Air Force Base, Florida, for alert missions during this launch.

A large AN/FPS-85 Space Track Radar was constructed at Site C-6, ~35 miles (56 km) E of Eglin main base, from October 1962, with Bendix as the primary contractor. Testing was scheduled for May 1965, but four months before, the building and all the equipment were destroyed in a fire caused by arcing electrical equipment. Rebuilt, this was the first phased-array radar system especially designed to detect and track objects in space. The physical structure of the system was 13 stories high, and the radar contained 5,134 transmitters and 4,660 receivers and utilized three computers. The Air Force took ownership of the site in September 1968 with the 20th Surveillance Squadron as the primary operator. Initially charged with tracking objects in Earth's orbit, new software installed in 1975 allowed tracking of submarine-launched ballistic missiles. This became the unit's primary mission, while continuing to perform space tracking. The AN/FPS-85 played an active role in America's space program. From 1971 to 1984, the 20th SURS was the site of the Alternate Space Surveillance Center. It provided computational support to the Space Surveillance Center at Cheyenne Mountain AS, Colo. If the need arose, the squadron could assume command and control for worldwide space track sensors. Space operations began in February 1969. Initially designed to track satellites, new software installed in 1975 enabled the unit to track submarine-launched ballistic missiles, or SLBMs. This became the unit's primary mission, while space surveillance became secondary. From 1971 to 1984 the 20 SURS served as the Alternate Space Surveillance Center, providing computational support to the Space Surveillance Center at Cheyenne Mountain AS, Colorado. If the need arose, the squadron could assume command and control of worldwide SSN. In 1979, the 20 SURS was renamed the 20th Missile Warning Squadron, or 20th MWS, and four years later, with inactivation of Strategic Air Command, the squadron was transferred to Air Force Space Command. During this time, the AN/FPS-85 was the proving ground for development of phased array radars designed specifically for early warning of SLBM attacks. These PAVE Phased Array Warning System radars assumed missile warning responsibilities from the 20th MWS and in 1987, the unit returned to its original mission of space surveillance with a corresponding name change to the 20th Space Surveillance Squadron. In February 2003, the unit was again re-designated, this time as the 20th SPCS. In October 2004, a detachment was activated under the 20th SPCS at Dahlgren, Virginia, and the unit assumed control of the U.S. Navy's AN/FPS-133 Space Surveillance Radar Fence and the Alternate Space Control Center.

A low security Federal Prison Camp was established under a maintenance contract with the Air Force, located at the old Niceville Road Prison where German POWs had been incarcerated during World War II, from November 1962. The camp moved to a 28-acre (110,000 m^{2}) compound at Auxiliary Field 6 in November 1969, and served as a minimum security facility for non-violent offenders. It would gain the nickname "Club Fed". The facility was closed in 2006 as a cost-cutting measure, with most of the prisoners transferred to the Pensacola Federal Prison Camp, Saufley Field, at NAS Pensacola in December 2005. Watergate conspirator E. Howard Hunt, former Maryland Governor Marvin Mandel, and fashion maven Aldo Gucci (tax evasion) were among those who served time at Eglin.

The 39th Bombardment Wing, Heavy, was activated on 15 November 1962 at Eglin AFB as a Strategic Air Command B-52G Stratofortress bombardment wing. It was assigned to SAC's 822d Air Division at Turner AFB, Georgia. The 39th BW was a redesignation of the former 4135th Strategic Wing which was inactivated on 1 February 1963 and the unit redesignated in order to retain the lineage of the combat units and to perpetuate the lineage of many currently inactive units with illustrious World War II records. The wing's 62d Bomb Squadron flew B-52G's which it acquired from the 301st Bomb Squadron.

As a preliminary step towards the AC-47 Spooky gunship program (retroactively Gunship I), under Project Tailchaser C-131B Samaritan, 53-7820, was given a gunsight for the side window, but instead of guns it had cameras in the cargo area. In 1964 the C-131 was ferried to Eglin AFB and a General Electric SUU-11A/A 7.62 mm Gatling-style Minigun was installed. Live ammunition was used and both over-water and over-land tests in late summer were successful. A C-47 was subsequently fitted with three Miniguns and side-firing tests began in September 1964. The initial combat operation of the FC-47, as it was initially officially named, began in Vietnam on 15 December 1964.

Ryan Model 147B Firebee reconnaissance drones, launched from DC-130A Hercules controllers, were tested at Eglin in 1964 under Strategic Air Command's project Lightning Bug, reaching operational status by May. They were deployed to Southeast Asia in August following the passage of the Tonkin Gulf Resolution, and initially operated out of Kadena Air Base, Okinawa, for missions over southern China.

The Cessna YAT-37D, modified from the standard T-37B primary trainer to evaluate the design as a counter-insurgency (COIN) attack/reconnaissance aircraft, first flew in September 1963. The airplane underwent performance and systems evaluation testing during 1964 at Edwards AFB, California, and Eglin AFB, Florida.

In 1964, C-141A-10-LM Starlifter, 63-8076, c.n. 300-6007, was tested in the climatic laboratory.

In 1964, prior to the start of Arc Light bombing missions in Southeast Asia on 18 June 1965, Boeing B-52F Stratofortresses of the 2d Bomb Wing demonstrated their conventional bombing capability over ranges at Eglin AFB.

On 23 March 1964, the GAM-72A Quail missile made its first operational test flight (nicknamed Shotgun) at Eglin AFB.

The 4486th Test Squadron at Eglin was the first USAF unit to receive the Bell UH-1F model Huey, which received two of these helicopters in September 1964.

The U.S. Air Force performed its first Fulton Skyhook recovery on 27 November 1964 when Capt. Nelson Gough was picked up by a modified C-123H Provider at Eglin.

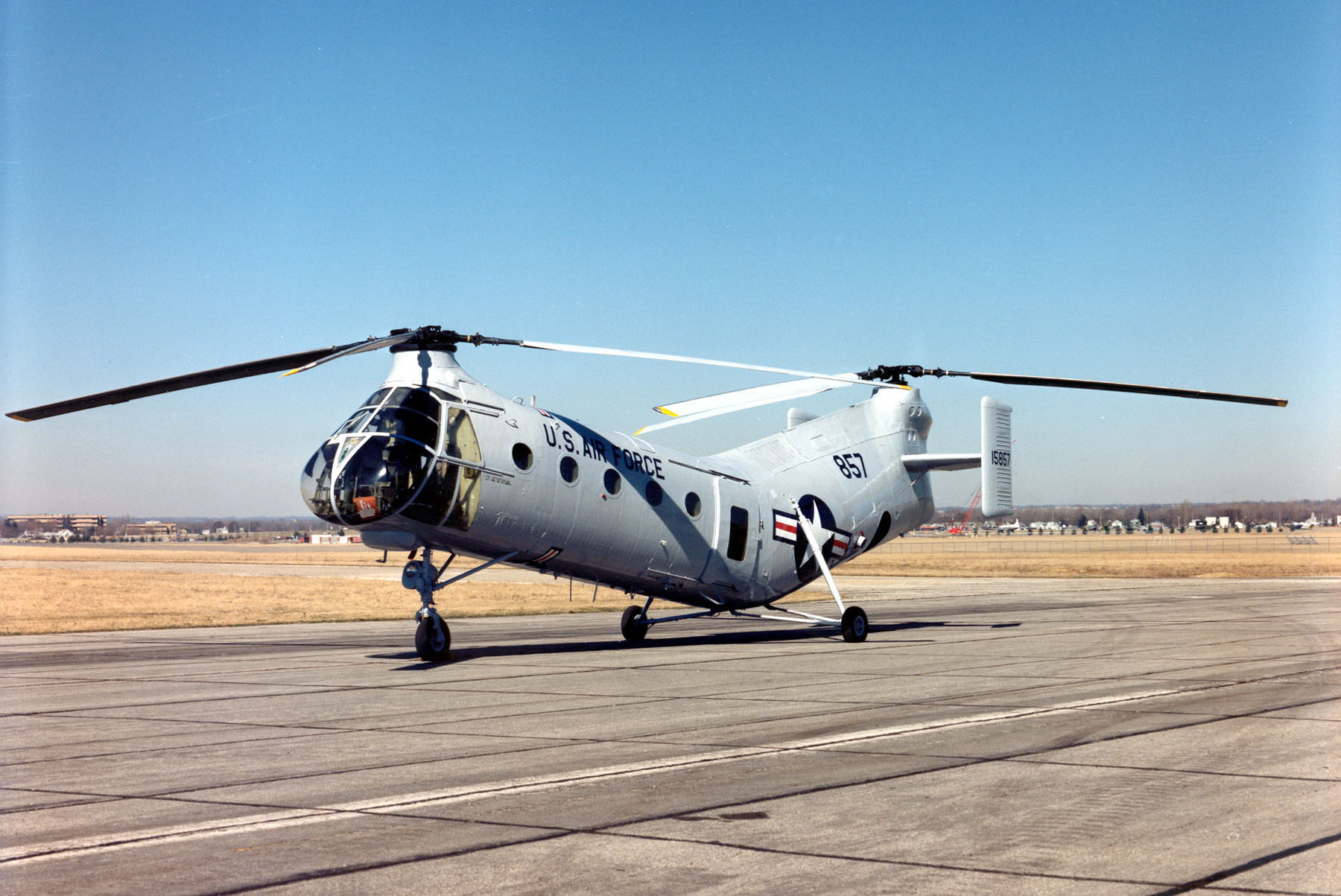
CH-21B now in the collection of the National Museum of the United States Air Force, last assigned at Eglin AFB

A CH-21B Workhorse helicopter, 51-5857, named "The Joker", was retired from Eglin in January 1965 to the National Museum of the United States Air Force, Wright Patterson AFB, Dayton, OH, where it is on display today.

The 48th Air Rescue Squadron was redesignated the 48th Air Recovery Squadron on 1 February 1965.

== Vietnam War ==
During the early part of 1965 about one dozen personnel of the 109th Quartermaster Corps, U.S. Army, were sent TDY to Eglin Air Force Base, where they assisted Air Force personnel developing an air delivery technique called the low-altitude parachute extraction system (LAPES). The 109th's mission was to provide parachute packing, temporary storage and rigging of supplies and equipment for aerial drop by aircraft of all the services. In addition, the 109th was to render technical assistance in the recovery and evacuation of airdrop equipment. Using the LAPES system, while a cargo plane flew a few feet above ground level, a drogue parachute would be released, pulling palletized cargo out of the aircraft and onto the drop zone. An alternative method was the ground proximity extraction system (GPES), in which cargo was yanked from the aircraft by a hook that snagged a cable traversing the runway. At full strength the unit would be capable of preparing 200 tons of material per day for delivery by free, high velocity or low-velocity drop techniques.

On 25 June 1965 the 39th Bomb Wing's 62d Bomb Squadron was reassigned to the 2d Bombardment Wing at Barksdale AFB, Louisiana to support SAC Arc Light combat operations over Southeast Asia, marking the phaseout of SAC operations at Eglin. At this time the 39th Bomb Wing was inactivated.

During 1965, F-5A Freedom Fighters were evaluated at Eglin under project Sparrow Hawk prior to being deployed to overseas under project Skoshi Tiger. Between 1965 and 1966, USAFTAWC personnel saw combat in Vietnam while simultaneously performing the combat evaluation of the Northrop F-5. The center was conducting this evaluation to determine if an inexpensive, uncomplicated fighter would be beneficial in lower levels of conflict, such as in Southeast Asia.

In 1965, the Air Force was initiating development of a low-cost guided bomb capability for its aircraft. Aiding that effort, Texas Instruments conducted a series of tests at the Armament Development and Test Center at Eglin AFB. These tests incorporated laser technology to guide free falling ordnance. This classified project received the code name PAVE and was the beginning of what would later become a series of sensors and precision-guided munitions.

"In the summer of 1965, a 15-man team tested and evaluated a Grumman E-2 Hawkeye at the Tactical Air Warfare Center at Eglin AFB. It was envisaged that the aircraft would be used in a forward-operating combat environment until a land-based command and control center would become operational. However, the type was never used by the USAF who relied on larger C-130 and C-121 variants to perform the mission."

The North Vietnamese began launching surface-to-air missiles against U.S. aircraft in 1965. The Air Force had little or no defense against these missiles and assigned the USAF Tactical Air Warfare Center the critical mission of developing effective surface-to-air missile (SAM) countermeasures to protect aircrews over the skies of Vietnam. In response to this new threat, USAFTAWC originated and fielded the Wild Weasel program. Simultaneously, the center was testing radar homing and warning equipment and self-protection electronic countermeasures jamming pods. Four F-100F Super Sabres, modified as Wild Weasel I groundfire suppression aircraft, deployed from Eglin to Southeast Asia on 21 November 1965, assigned to the operational control of the 388th Tactical Fighter Wing.

Systems integration of the Hughes AIM-4D Falcon air-to-air missile with the new model F-4D Phantom II was accomplished at Eglin AFB during late 1965 under Project Dancing Falcon. "The AIM-4D's disappointing performance in terms of MiG kills – only five in Vietnam (the first of which, a MiG-17, was claimed on 26 October 1967 by Capts Larry D. Cobb and Alan A. Lavoy flying F-4D 66-7565) – was largely attributed to the missile's inherent design features, which had been chosen with strategic air defence in mind."

Construction began in 1965 on a new $3.4 million three-story base hospital with completion slated for mid-1967. Ground-breaking was held on 25 June 1965, attended by Congressman Bob Sikes; Lewis Turner, Assistant Secretary of the Air Force; Maj. Gen. Richard L. Bohannon, USAF Surgeon General; and Col. Robert C. Marshall, commander of the Mobile District of the U.S. Army Corps of Engineers, among others.

In 1966, the third Lockheed YF-12A, 60-6936, c/n 1003, first flown on 13 March 1964, participated in AIM-47 missile firing tests at Eglin AFB. "On 22 March, the crew of 936 successfully fired a missile from 74,500 feet while cruising at Mach 3.15. The target was a Ryan Q-2C flying at 1,500 feet. Another Q-2C, which was cruising at 20,000 feet, was downed on 13 May. On 21 September, the crew of 936 fired a missile from 74,000 feet and Mach 3.2 at a remotely piloted Boeing QB-47 flying near sea level. Shortly after these tests, the YF-12As were placed in storage for three years."

The 48th Air Recovery Squadron was redesignated the 48th Aerospace Rescue and Recovery Squadron on 8 January 1966.

In 1966, HU-16 Albatrosses of the 48th ARRSq were deployed to Southeast Asia as Detachment 7, based at Da Nang Air Base, South Vietnam.

Seven off-the-shelf civilian lightplanes were tested at Eglin AFB in 1966 to fulfill the forward air control (FAC) mission as replacements the Cessna O-1 Bird Dog, with the Cessna 337 Super Skymaster selected to fulfill the mission.

On 1 March 1966, the Air Force Armament Laboratory was established at Eglin, replacing the Directorate of Armament Development, which had assumed the responsibilities for the discontinued Air Force Armament Center in early 1965. The new laboratory, the eighth major lab of the Air Force Systems Command, was composed of the Biological Chemical Weapons, Ballistics, Targets and Scorers, and the Engineering and Evaluation Divisions. The lab was designated the "lead" laboratory of the Research and Technology Division for non-nuclear munitions for the Air Force.

The first Tactical Air Command F-4D Phantom IIs assigned to a combat unit arrived at the 33d Tactical Fighter Wing at Eglin on 21 June 1966.

The 560th Civil Engineering Squadron was activated at Eglin AFB in November 1966, located at Eglin Auxiliary Field 2. Also known as the Civil Engineering Field Activities Center, the unit was responsible for training replacement personnel destined for RED HORSE units in Southeast Asia. The 560th was capable of field training 2,400 individuals each year to keep the six RED HORSE squadrons up to strength. The 560th continued this mission until inactivated in early 1970.

Eleven C-130 Hercules transports were modified into HC-130P probe-and-drogue refuelers for CH-3 helicopters in 1966–67, with training beginning at Eglin in 1966. The first fuel transfer was conducted between an HC-130P and an HH-3E on 14 December 1966.

With the increasing U.S. involvement in Southeast Asia in the 1960s, the need for increased emphasis on conventional weapons development made Eglin's mission even more important. On 1 August 1968, the Air Proving Ground Center was redesignated the Armament Development and Test Center to centralize responsibility for research, development, test and evaluation, and initial acquisition of non-nuclear munitions for the Air Force. On 1 October 1979, the Center was given division status. The Armament Division, redesignated Munitions Systems Division on 15 March 1989, placed into production the precision-guided munitions for the laser, television, and infrared guided bombs; two anti-armor weapon systems; and an improved hard target weapon, the GBU-28, used in Operation Desert Storm during the Persian Gulf War. The division was also responsible for developing the Advanced Medium Range Air-to-Air Missile (AMRAAM), an Air Force-led joint project with the U.S. Navy.

On 9 January 1967, Tactical Airlift Command initiated Combat Lady, a test of classified weapons at Eglin AFB. This project was later canceled.

In April 1967, the U.S. Air Force Special Air Warfare School was activated at Hurlburt Field under the Special Air Warfare Center, then located at Eglin AFB. In 1968, the school was re-designated the U.S. Air Force Special Operations School. On 1 June 1987, USAFSOS, as an organizational element of the 23d Air Force, was assigned to the U.S. Special Operations Command, headquartered at MacDill AFB, Florida. As of 22 May 1990, the school became a reporting unit of the newly established Air Force Special Operations Command. During its formative years, the school's main thrust was the preparation of Air Force personnel for duty in Southeast Asia. Since then, the USAFSOS curriculum has grown from a single course of instruction with 300 graduates per year to 78 classes representing 28 formal courses a year and approximately 25 off-station tutorials.

In the spring and summer of 1967 the Air Force experimented with several B-58 Hustlers for the conventional strike role in Project BULLSEYE, including 59-2428, of the 43d Bomb Wing (Medium). The four stores pylons were modified for the carriage of conventional bombs, and the aircraft were flown on low-level strike test missions out of Eglin. It has been reported that one B-58 was painted in Southeast Asia camouflage but no proof of this has been verified.

On 1 June 1967, two 48th Aerospace Rescue and Recovery Squadron Sikorsky HH-3E helicopters completed the first helicopter crossing of the Atlantic. The 4,270-mile (6,870 km) flight followed Lindbergh's route from New York to Paris of 40 years earlier. They completed the flight in 30 hours, 46 minutes with nine inflight refueling from HC-130P tankers to set a FAI record.

The 48th Aerospace Rescue and Recovery Squadron was redesignated the 48th Aerospace Rescue and Recovery Squadron, Training on 8 July 1967.

Southern Airways retired the last of its DC-3 prop airliners on 31 July 1967, with the final flight between Dothan, Alabama and Atlanta, Georgia.

The AC-130A Spectre gunship was operationally tested at Eglin Air Force Base from 12 June to September 1967 under Project Gunship II. The prototype, modified from JC-130A, 54-1626, was selected for conversion at Wright-Patterson Air Force Base, by the Aeronautical Systems Division, with flight tests conducted at Eglin. The prototype was then flown to Vietnam, arriving there on 21 September.

Following Israel's victory in the Mideast War of June 1967 huge amounts of Soviet manufactured equipment were captured, including radars in working order. Israel was not a close U.S. ally at the time, so a working Westinghouse TPS-43 surveillance radar was "horse traded" to Israel for a Russian Bar Lock (P-50) early warning/GCI radar. It was subsequently tested by Eglin personnel at a site set up at Cape San Blas, Florida, where it was found to be very ruggedly built, using old style World War II circuitry, and was very reliable, designed to be maintained by people with very little technical knowledge.

Beginning in 1965, Project Black Spot was a test program designed to give the Air Force a self-contained night attack capability to seek out and destroy targets along the Ho Chi Minh Trail. After the program was approved by the Department of Defense in early 1966, E-Systems of Greenville, Texas, modified two C-123K Providers which were redesignated NC-123Ks, but were often referred to as AC-123Ks. The aircraft were equipped with a long, 57.75 inch nose fairing that housed an X-band forward-looking radar. Below and aft of the extended radome was a turret with Forward-Looking Infrared (FLIR), Low-Level Light Television (LLLTV), and a laser range-finder/illuminator. Also, a low-level Doppler navigation radar and weapons release computer were installed. Two rectangular aluminum weapons dispensers (for CBU bomblets) were stacked within the fuselage. Each container housed 12 cells, each cell containing three Cluster Bomb Units (CBUs). Depending on the type of CBU installed, the containers had a capacity of between 2,664 and 6,372 one pound bomblets. The bomblets were released through 12 openings in the cargo floor that aligned with the cells in the weapons dispenser. The lower fuselage contained 12 inward opening doors that aligned with the openings in the cargo floor, forming a chute. Bomblet release was controlled by a weapons panel in the forward section of the fuselage. In the event of an emergency, the entire load could be jettisoned manually. The first aircraft, 54-691, was delivered to Eglin AFB in August 1967 and the second, 54-698, incorporating an AN/ASD-5 Black Crow direction finder set (engine ignition sensor), was delivered in February 1968. The two aircraft were then deployed, first the Republic of Korea, to be evaluated against North Korean high-speed patrol boats used to insert agents, 19 August – 23 October 1968; and then to South Vietnam with operations beginning 15 November 1968. Despite their success, with 70% of all missions completed and in-commission rate of 84%, there were no follow-on NC-123Ks modified. The two aircraft were transferred to the 16th Special Operations Squadron at Udon Royal Thai Air Force Base, Thailand, where they continued to serve from late 1969 to June 1970. Both airframes were then returned to standard C-123K configuration to serve again as airlifters.

The 33d Tactical Fighter Wing began receiving F-4E Phantom IIs in October 1967.

Flight testing of laser-guided bombs began at Eglin AFB on 18 November 1967. The first use in combat will be on 23 May 1968, when an F-4D Phantom II of the 8th Tactical Fighter Wing, drops a Paveway Laser Guided Bomb. Modified F-4Ds, fitted with laser illuminators, designate target for the strike.

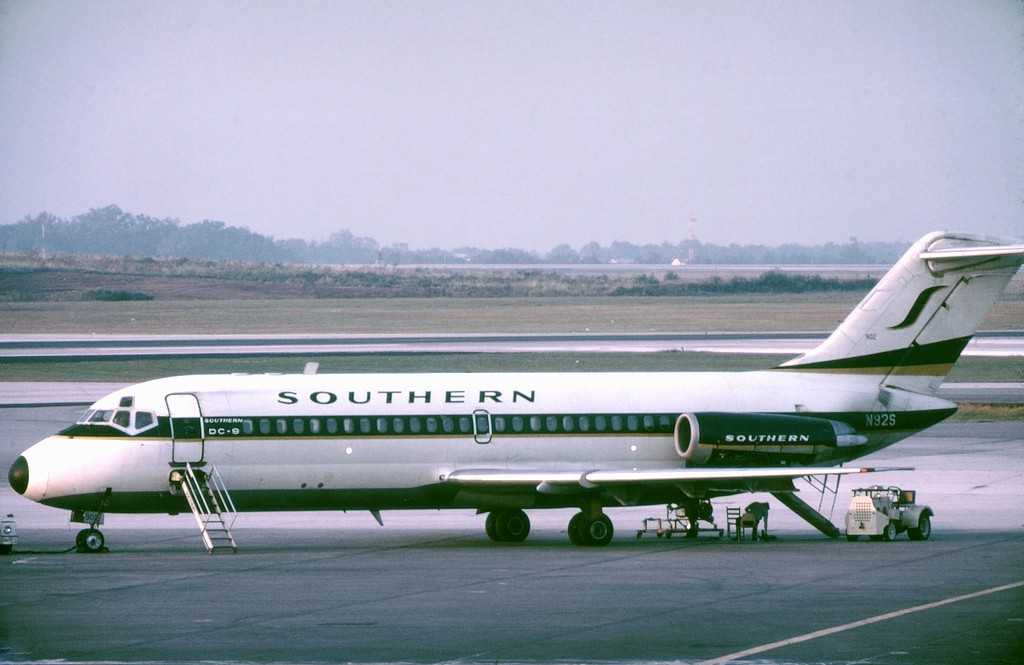
Douglas DC-9-15, N92S, of Southern Airways at Atlanta, Georgia, in October 1973. This aircraft regularly operated into Okaloosa Air Terminal. Seen here in original livery before Southern went to a blue and white scheme.

In 1968, Southern Airways added four Douglas DC-9 aircraft to its fleet and began daily flights out of VPS, joining Martin 4-0-4s, in use since 1961. Air New Orleans began operations with service to New Orleans but this operation would not endure.

In 1968, an area was added to the main chamber of the Climatic Laboratory to specifically allow the C-5A Galaxy to be tested. This appendant area is approximately 60 feet (18 m) by 85 feet (26 m) with a ceiling height of 75 feet (23 m). With this appendant area included, usable floor space is approximately 55,000 square feet (5,100 m^{2}).

The first North American OV-10A Bronco for the U.S. Air Force was accepted, along with the first U.S. Marine Corps OV-10A, in a joint ceremony held at Port Columbus International Airport, Columbus, Ohio, in February 1968. Maj. Gen. Thomas C. Corbin, commanding officer of the Special Air Warfare Center, represented the Air Force at the event. The USAF Bronco was then flown by Capt. Gary Sheets to Eglin for the 4410th Combat Crew Training Squadron, 4410th Combat Crew Training Wing, designated as the first Air Force OV-10A unit.

The first jet-augmented Fairchild C-123K Provider arrived at Hurlburt Field on 5 January 1968, and the first of 76 of the type to be ferried to Vietnam by the 319th Air Commando Squadron departed on 10 April.

Sensors used in Southeast Asia for Operation Igloo White were developed, in part, at Eglin. Under the related Pave Eagle I project, YQU-22A aircraft (modified Beechcraft Bonanzas) primary mission equipment and PME flight tests were conducted at Eglin in 1968.

In 1968–1969, electronic testing of the F-111 was conducted at Eglin using up to three aircraft.

In September 1968, B-57E Canberra, 55-4235, was sent to Eglin for tests. In April 1970 it was retired to AMARC at Davis-Monthan AFB, Arizona.

The 557th Civil Engineering Squadron (Heavy Repair), (RED HORSE), originally activated 5 February 1968, and organized at Auxiliary Field 2 on 10 February 1968, deployed to Osan Air Base, South Korea, in April 1968 to assist in a build-up following the capture of USS Pueblo, with a permanent change of station to Osan AB effective 30 August 1968. The squadron left Korea in 1969 after 18 months in country, returning to Aux. Fld. 2 on 10 December 1969, and was stationed at Eglin AFB until its inactivation on 1 June 1972.

Beginning in 1969, Ford Aerospace developed an early laser targeting pod, the AN/AVQ-10 Pave Knife, for the USAF and US Navy to designate and guide laser-guided bombs, and replaced the essentially improvised Airborne Laser Designator (ALD), a hand-held laser. Testing at Eglin, the system met specifications. McDonnell Douglas F-4D-31-MC, 66-7693, acted as the test-bed at the Armament Development Test Center, and the pod was carried on left inner wing pylon (Station 2), bolted on in an asymmetric configuration which typically included a 370 US gallon drop tank on the starboard wing, plus up to two LGBs (on Stations 1 and 8), along with the regular fit of a centreline tank, Sparrows and ECM. It performed so well that within a few weeks, it was shipped to Vietnam and placed into service where it met objectives.

On 7 February 1969, the 48th Aerospace Rescue and Recovery Squadron, Training was inactivated at Eglin AFB.

A Lockheed C-5A Galaxy arrived at Eglin AFB on 27 June 1969 for 14 weeks of testing in the Climatic Hangar.

From late 1969 through 28 September 1970, the Armament Development and Test Center conducted Category II and munitions compatibility testing of the B-57G Canberra Tropic Moon III night attack aircraft, using between one and three airframes, while the Tactical Air Warfare Center, TAC, utilized three by 8 June 1970 in Category III tests to develop tactics, ending formally on 27 July 1970. Concurrently, the 13th Bombardment Squadron (Tactical), reactivated 8 February 1969, began training with five B-57Gs at MacDill AFB, Florida, from 26 May 1970. Despite ongoing problems with the forward-looking radar, and other sensor systems, the first eleven aircraft of the 13th BS deployed to Ubon Royal Thai Air Force Base on 15 September 1970.

Specially selected raiders for Operation Ivory Coast, the attempted POW rescue from Son Tay prison in North Vietnam, were extensively trained and rehearsed at Eglin Air Force Base, while planning and intelligence gathering continued from 25 May to 20 November 1970. The mission failed when it was found during the raid that all the prisoners had been previously moved to another camp.

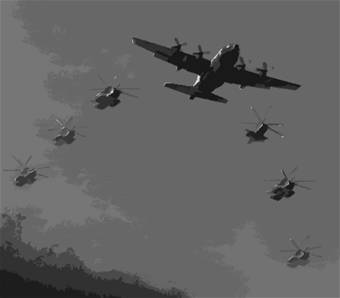
Mixed formation of helicopters and Combat Talon of the Son Tay rescue operation during a practice mission. Crews logged 1,017 hours in 368 practice sorties without an accident, despite the C-130E(I) operating at 105 knots, just above stall speed, the maximum the helicopters could manage.

During 15–24 August 1970, two new Sikorsky HH-53 rescue helicopters made an 8,739-mile (14,064 km) flight from Eglin AFB, to Da Nang, South Vietnam, led by Major Frederic M. "Marty" Donahue. The flight, which took nine days with seven intermediate stops, included a 1,700-mile (2,700 km) nonstop transpacific flight between Shemya Island in the Aleutians and Misawa Air Base, Japan. HC-130 tankers refueled the helicopters in this first transpacific helicopter flight.

On 2 October 1970, the U.S. Air Force Special Operations Force at Hurlburt Field, took possession of the first Bell UH-1N Twin Huey.

Continuing problems with the forward-looking radar and other sensor systems (which were ultimately never resolved) on the Tropic Moon III B-57Gs after deployment to Thailand in the September 1970 meant that ADTC testing of the design continued at Eglin into 1971. Concurrently, the Air Force delivered the Cat II test airframe, 53-3906, to Westinghouse Electronic Systems in Maryland for modification under Project Pave Gat to house a special bomb bay installation of one Emerson TAT-161 turret with a single M61 20mm cannon as a gunship. After initial flight tests in the Baltimore area, the gun B-57G was flown to Eglin in January 1971. Delays occurred in testing at Eglin AFB, due to competition for mission time from the Tropic Moon III B-57Gs as the airframe was also used in the radar remedial program, coupled with a spare parts shortage for mandatory maintenance keeping it grounded from 9 April to 16 May. Three of four Pave Gat missions flown on 16 May were aborted due to equipment failures, causing loss of three more weeks of testing. Operational deployment was slipped to October 1971 on 13 May 1971. Once underway, Pave Gat tests proved "that the B-57G could hit stationary or moving targets with its 20mm gun, day or night. Loaded with 4,000 rounds of ammunition, the Pave Gat B-57G could hit as many as 20 targets, three times as many as the bomb-carrying B-57G. The Pave Gat aircraft could avoid antiaircraft fire by firing from offset positions, while the bomb carrier had to pass directly over the target." Category II and III testing was completed 31 July 1971. Deployment to SEA was resisted, however, by the Seventh and Thirteenth Air Forces and others as the decision had been made in August 1971 to return the B-57G squadron to the U.S. in early 1972, leaving insufficient evaluation time. Project Pave Gat was terminated 21 December 1971.

From 11 July 1971, in a joint operation with the U.S. Department of Agriculture, seven UC-123Ks from Langley AFB, Virginia, and Hurlburt Field, and eight C-47s from England AFB, Louisiana, sprayed Malathion on more than 2,500,000 acres (10,000 km^{2}) in southeast Texas to combat Venezuelan Equine Encephalomyelitis.

Operation Ranch Hand was the name of the aerial application of defoliants in Southeast Asia, aimed at stripping away the dense jungle that hid enemy activities. The center for US testing of the herbicides used in Ranch Hand was Eglin AFB, primarily on Range C-52A. For ten years, 1961 to 1971, 222,530 liters of herbicides (Agents Purple, Orange, White and Blue) were sprayed at a test grid on the base reservation. These herbicides were estimated to contain at least 3.1 kg of dioxin. Soil sampling at the test site conducted in 1970–1987 confirmed that there was TCDD contamination, though only about 1 percent remained. "Researchers theorized that much of the dioxin was broken down in the hot Florida sun or relocated due to wind or water erosion. At the storage and loading site west of the airstrip, residual dioxin was also found. Mitigation efforts were conducted, including the construction of a concrete drainage ditch and the building of a sediment pond to keep the dioxin from migrating into the nearby ravine and water bodies that lead to the city of Fort Walton Beach water supply. In 2001, the area around Hardstand 7 was capped with concrete and remediation activities concluded."

The 55th Aerospace Rescue and Recovery Squadron, equipped with HC-130H Hercules, was reassigned from McCoy AFB, Florida, to Eglin AFB on 25 June 1971. It will also operate Sikorsky CH-53s from 1973 to 1980, Sikorsky CH-3s from 1980 to 1982, and then Sikorsky MH-60 Black Hawks from 1982 to 1999.

North American Rockwell Block 1 Apollo Command Module, serial 007, a Block 1 spacecraft, built for training and Earth-orbit missions, delivered to NASA in 1966 (and originally identical to CM 012 in which astronauts Gus Grissom, Ed White, and Roger Chaffee died in the 1967 launchpad fire), after serving as a ground test vehicle was modified in 1967 for use in water-survival training. As part of their training, astronauts inside the capsule were dropped into the Gulf of Mexico by a crane from an aircraft carrier to simulate the force of splashdown. Apollo crews also trained for extended recovery by remaining at sea for several days at a time in the Command Module. This prepared astronauts for the possibility of a splashdown far from the planned recovery site. In 1971, CM 007 was transported to Eglin Air Force Base, where it was exposed to cold water and cold air during testing through 1973 for the forthcoming Skylab program. It was displayed at several open houses during this period at the base. The Command Module survived the tests only to end up in an equipment lot of the Houston Department of Public Works, where it remained for 12 years. In 1988, CM 007 was restored for the Museum of Flight in Seattle, Washington, where it is now preserved, by the Kansas Cosmosphere and Space Center.

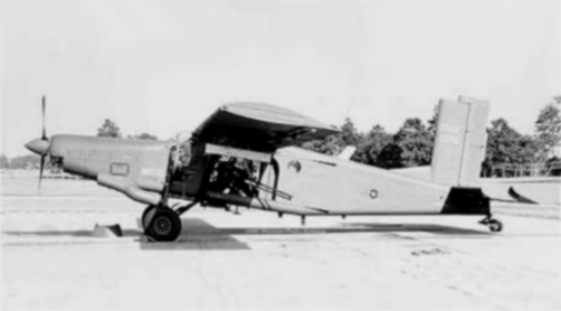
Fairchild AU-23A Peacemaker, 72-1316, at Eglin AFB, Florida during 1972

In May 1971, the Aeronautical Systems Division at Wright-Patterson AFB, Ohio, initiated the program Credible Chase to evaluate the potential use of armed light utility short takeoff and landing aircraft in Southeast Asia. The program was designed to add mobility and firepower to the Republic of Vietnam Air Forces in a relatively short time. Two commercial aircraft were selected for testing: the Fairchild Porter and the Helio Stallion. Initial performance testing was conducted with leased aircraft (Porter N352F, c/n 2011) at Eglin Air Force Base and was successful enough to warrant a combat evaluation. The Porter, designated AU-23A, was fitted with a side-firing 20 mm XM-197 Gatling cannon, four wing pylons and a center fuselage station for external ordnance. The 20 mm cannon was essentially a three-barrel version of the M61 Vulcan 6-barrel 20 mm cannon. The aircraft could carry a variety of ordnance including forward firing gun pods, 500- and 250-pound bombs, napalm units, cluster bomb units, flares, rockets, smoke grenades and propaganda leaflet dispensers. The combat evaluation, Pave Coin, was done in June and July 1971.

The AU-24A Stallion had the same side-mounted gun, as well as five underwing and fuselage stations. In January 1972, the second test phase for the AU-24A began at Eglin Air Force Base, Fla. The initial aircraft used, 72-1319, was leased from Helio and retained its civilian configuration, but it allowed basic flight testing to begin. The combat evaluation of the Credible Chase program was canceled in February 1972, but the initial (stateside) evaluation was kept on the program schedule. The first combat equipped AU-24A was delivered on 4 March 1972, and operational test and evaluation began on 17 March, but was delayed after a review of contractor quality control began on 3 April. On 10 April, the review imposed a number of flight restrictions on the AU-24A limiting maximum airspeed, dive and bank angles, and all instrument, weather and night test flights. The OT&E of the AU-24A was officially started over on 22 April, and by 3 May, the aircraft was again in trouble. This time the problem was a dynamic instability during flight. The problems were resolved by 12 May, and the test program continued until completion on 22 May. Starting on 28 June, the AU-24As were flown to Davis-Monthan Air Force Base, Ariz. for storage. The Credible Chase program was canceled and no AU-24A was delivered to the Republic of Vietnam Air Force.

The 4400th Special Operations Squadron (Provisional) was created to complete the operational test and evaluation of the Credible Chase aircraft. The first AU-23A, 72-1306 was delivered to the 4400th SOS on 2 January 1972, followed by two more aircraft (72-1304 and -1305) at the end of the month. Testing continued until 4 February, when the three aircraft were grounded because of cracks in the rudder assemblies. The first three aircraft were returned to Fairchild for repair and delivery of new aircraft resumed in late April 1972. On 10 May 1972, an AU-23A, 72-1309, crashed after an in-flight engine failure. The pilot was not hurt, but all AU-23As were grounded until 22 May, during the accident investigation. The last AU-23A was delivered on 7 June and testing was completed on 28 June. The 4400th recommended the aircraft not be used in combat without a major upgrade program. Specific problems identified included a slow combat speed (135 knots), a low working altitude, no capability for "zoom" escapes after delivering ordnance and a complete lack of armor protection for the crew and vital aircraft systems. On 30 June 1972, the 4400th SOS ferried the AU-23As to Davis-Monthan Air Force Base, Arizona, for storage.

The climatic facility was named the McKinley Climatic Laboratory on 12 June 1971 after the late Col. Ashley C. McKinley.

A new base exchange, commissary and movie theatre were constructed in the Bens Lake area of the base in 1972.

The 823d Civil Engineering Squadron (Heavy Repair), (RED HORSE), inactivated in Southeast Asia in 1971, was reactivated at Eglin AFB on 1 June 1972, incorporating elements of the 557th CES (HR), which was inactivated at Eglin the same day. The 823rd became a Tactical Air Command (later Air Combat Command) unit.

In 1972, the 58th Tactical Fighter Squadron, 33d Tactical Fighter Wing, was deployed to Udorn Royal Thai Air Force Base, Thailand, under what was known as the "Summer Help Program." During this period, the 58th was credited as the first temporary duty unit to down an enemy aircraft. On 2 June 1972, Major Philip W. Handley and Lieutenant John J. Smallwood shot down a MiG-19 with a 300 round burst from their M-61A Vulcan Cannon, disproving the perception that American aircrews had lost their dogfighting skills (Smallwood was later shot down and to this day remains listed as missing in action). Just over two months later on 12 August 1972, another 58th Phantom II was credited with a kill after shooting down a MiG-21 with an AIM-7 Sparrow, a radar guided missile. This second kill was the last credited to the 58th during its six-month rotation in Southeast Asia.

In early 1972, a squadron of Republic F-84F Thunderstreaks were retired to Eglin to serve as range targets. Last operated by the 170th Tactical Fighter Squadron, 183rd Tactical Fighter Group, Illinois ANG, and flown to Eglin in Vietnam-era camouflage to serve as live fire targets when that unit became the first Air National Guard group to reequip with F-4 Phantom IIs after corrosion discovered in wings of remaining F-84 fleet. One example, taken out to the range, was retrieved by helicopter for the infant Air Force Armament Museum.

The final QF-104 Starfighter drone operation took place 3 July 1972 when 56-0737 flew an unmanned mission and was killed by an AIM-9J Sidewinder missile, its 21st unmanned mission. The two F-104Ds assigned to base flight (formerly assigned at George AFB, California), are turned over to the Puerto Rico Air National Guard as the QF-104 program ends in the summer of 1972. One of these airframes, 57-1331, later returns to Eglin in 1975 for display at the infant Air Force Armament Museum.

The last ADM-20C Quail operational test was flown at the Eglin AFB water test area on 13 July 1972.

The sole Windecker YE-5A low-visibility airframe, 73-1653, c/n 005, delivered to the Air Force in February 1973, underwent radar reflectivity testing for five years at Eglin beginning in 1973 by both the USAF and Lockheed. With a glass-fiber airframe and internally fitted RAM, it was an early contributor of data on "stealth" designs.

== Late Cold War era ==
In April 1973, Pave Deuce, an Eglin AFB program calling for low-cost, full-size, supersonic targets, was awarded to Sperry Rand Corporation to convert F-102A Delta Daggers into QF-102A (manned) and PQM-102A (unmanned) drones.

Southern Airways operated its last Martin 4-0-4 flights serving Eglin and the Okaloosa Air Terminal in 1973, the last reciprocating-engined airliners to serve the base, with all further service now provided by Southern's DC-9 fleet.

The last AGM-28 Hound Dog operational test was flown at the Eglin AFB water test area on 24 July 1973.

From January to March 1973, the Armament Development and Test Center conducted a competitive evaluation of the two prototype GAU-8/A 30 mm cannon designs by Philco-Ford, Newport Beach, California, and General Electric, Burlington, Virginia. On 2 April 1973, The Armament Development and Test Center selected the General Electric version of the GAU-8/A 30 mm cannon over the Philco-Ford model for the A-10 Thunderbolt II. Test Site C-74L on Range 21 West in Walton County was used for weapons testing of the pre-production Gatling-type rotary cannon from 1974 to 1978 using various types of rounds, including depleted uranium. An estimated 16,315 pounds of DU was expended at the site. Approximately 9,257 pounds of DU were collected and disposed of during remediation activities conducted between March 1978 and June 1987. The remainder of the material has since been remediated, was dispersed or vaporized as part of DU ordnance testing, or remains onsite and requires remediation. The test area currently consists of a 4-acre (16,000 m^{2}) radiologically controlled area, fire control/ballistics building, gun corridor, target area, well house building, drum storage area, and surrounding land. The Department of the Air Force has proposed shutting down and remediating Site C-74L, post-2002.

On 19 October 1973, pilots of the 33d Tactical Fighter Wing delivered at least 13 Eglin-based F-4E Phantom IIs to Israel during the Yom Kippur War as part of Operation Nickel Grass.

The tenth single-seat McDonnell Douglas F-15A Eagle, F-15A-4-MC, 71-0289, F-10, c/n 0011/A010, that had been delivered to the Air Force on 16 January 1974, was assigned to the 3247th Test Squadron, 3246th Test Wing, Eglin AFB in 1974 for Category 1 Tactical electronic warfare system, radar and avionics evaluation. It would remain on strength at Eglin until 1990 when it was reassigned to the 586th Test Squadron, 46th Test Wing, Holloman AFB, New Mexico.

The Air Force Armament Museum was founded on base in 1975.

Retired aircraft types that were expended as range targets in tests in the 1970s included RA-5C Vigilantes, F-84F Thunderstreaks, F-89J Scorpions, F-100 Super Sabres, TF-102A Delta Daggers, at least one HH-43A Huskie, and T-33A Shooting Stars, among others. Armor targets included M41, M47, and M48 tanks, M53/T97 self-propelled assault guns, and M113 armored personnel carriers.

In January 1975, one of three preproduction A-10 Thunderbolt II attack aircraft, equipped with one of three preproduction GE-built GAU-8/A 30 mm cannon, arrived at Eglin AFB for qualification, reliability and combat ammunition compatibility tests using Aerojet Ordnance and Manufacturing Company ammunition. First phase testing was scheduled to be completed in July 1975, with additional testing with second source Honeywell ammunition planned to start in January 1976.

The newly constructed James E. Plew Terminal Building of the Okaloosa Air Terminal, located on State Road 85, opened its doors in mid-February 1975, with a dedication ceremony held on Saturday, 22 February. Congressman Bob Sikes and Southern Airways President Frank Hulse were some of the guest speakers. The 32,000 sq ft (3,000 m2) facility was constructed at a cost of $1.7 million. Financing for the entire facility was through federal, state, and local money. Federal grants totaled $472,000, state $80,000, Okaloosa County bond sale $1.1 million, and Southern Airways $190,000. First year enplaned passengers totaled 97,000 with Southern Airways as the sole airline with 12 departing flights daily.

A new sun, wind, rain and dust facility was completed in April 1975 as an addition to the McKinley Climatic Laboratory. Designed to withstand internal winds of 100 mph and maintain temperatures from 60 to 145 degrees Fahrenheit, the new addition simulated extreme climatic conditions for ground vehicles. Rain could be simulated from one to 15 inches per hour and humidity controlled between 20 and 100 percent. Silicon dust could be used to simulate intense dust storms, the powder being collected and re-used following tests. Construction was supervised by the Army Corps of Engineers, with the Beckman Construction Company of Fort Worth, Texas, doing the work. The 50 X 50 X 30 foot building cost an estimated $432,500.

Selected on 27 April 1975, the installation served as one of four main U.S. Vietnamese Refugee Processing Centers operated by the Interagency Task Force for Indochina Refugees, where base personnel housed and processed more than 10,000 Southeast Asian refugees, the first 374 of which arrived on board a Northwest Orient Boeing 747 on 4 May 1975. The final 16 refugees processed through the Eglin center departed on 15 September 1975. Eglin again became an Air Force refugee resettlement center on 25 April 1980 processing over 9,200 Cubans who fled to the U.S. between April and May 1980.

From late 1975, until it was finally sunk (accidentally, by an AGM-65 Maverick missile) in 1981, the former mine counter-measures ship USS Ozark was anchored south of Destin, Florida, as a water range target for Eglin tests. It lies in about 320 feet (98 m) of water ~60 miles (97 km) offshore.

In July 1976, Air Force Systems Command reported that testing of a NASA Lockheed U-2 in temperatures as cold as −57 degrees Celsius had been completed in the McKinley Climatic Laboratory to isolate flight-control malfunctions occurring in cold temperatures at high altitude.

Climatic testing of the ground-test-vehicle (GTV) for the Sikorsky UH-60 Black Hawk program was conducted in the McKinley Climatic Laboratory from September to November 1976, spanning temperature ranges from −65 °F to +125 °F (52 °C).

On 2 March 1977, the historic Valparaiso Inn, which once served as the Eglin Officers' Club, was heavily damaged by fire.

In 1978, the USAF Tactical Air Warfare Center assumed responsibility for the USAF Air Ground Operations School. In the same year, the Electronic Warfare Evaluation Program became another one of the USAFTAWC's weapons system evaluation programs, and resulted in the activation of the 4487th Electronic Warfare Aggressor Squadron in 1990.

The Ryan AQM-34V, an electronic countermeasures update of the AQM-34H leaflet-dropping RPV used in the conflict in Southeast Asia (and known as "bullshit bombers"), was thoroughly tested by TAC in an exercise named "Gallant Eagle", conducted at Eglin AFB, during the week of 30 October through 3 November 1978. M. E. "Gene" Juberg, Teledyne Ryan Aeronautical's ops manager for the exercise, "summarized the purpose and results of the show in a memorandum to the main plant after completion of the maneuvers. It reads, in part: 'This trip report covers the writer's observations of the 432nd TDG participation. Their deployment team consisted of 134 personnel operating out of Hurlburt Field, four miles west of Fort Walton Beach. Gallant Eagle was a combined Air Force, Army, Navy, and Marine exercise. The 432nd's participation was to fly four EW sorties with AQM-34V vehicles on Monday, Wednesday, and Friday. The squadron deployed from Davis-Monthan with three DC-130 launch planes with four drones uploaded on each, three CH-3 MARS recovery helicopters, a TPW-2 Ground Director and a minimum of ground-handling equipment and spares. Two additional DC-130 aircraft were flown in from Davis-Monthan with spares for the launch planes, and a third came in at the end of the exercise to transport the Ground Director back home. The EW mission for the exercise was to lay a chaff corridor at 3,000 feet MSL while heading toward the coastline. The two drones, flying two minutes apart in trail formation, were then climbed to 19,000 and 20,000 feet MSL respectively, where they took up an active jamming orbit. The drones were followed by an E6A [sic] or EB-57 aircraft which also dispensed chaff and provided EW active jamming through the chaffed corridor. The operation clearly demonstrated TAC's philosophy of sending in the decoy drones first to protect the manned jammers and fighter planes to follow.' Gene Juberg's field report concluded, stating that all objectives of the meet were met with unqualified success from the performance of the AQM-34V. The 432nd Tactical Drone Squadron, under the command of Col. James Witzel, was recognized by top TAC generals and commended for a job well done."

Following the mass suicides by members of the Peoples Temple, a cult led by Jim Jones, at Jonestown in Guyana on 18 November 1978, CH-53 helicopters of the 55th ARRSq were utilized to evacuate the dead.

In 1979, the 4751st Air Defense Missile Squadron was inactivated. It had conducted practice Bomarc missile shoots for Air Defense Command crews since 1963, and was activated in February 1958 for testing of the Bomarc A and B models.

On 1 July 1979, Southern Airways, serving Eglin since 1957, merged with North Central Airlines to form Republic Airlines. The new company continued operations to the Okaloosa Air Terminal.

The AGM-114 Hellfire missile underwent test firings at the Site C-7 Hellfire range on Range 72 from 1980. Upgraded Hellfire tests continue through 2011, with the AGM-114R Hellfire II being successfully tested in August 2010.

The first AGM-65E laser Maverick missile was fired at Eglin AFB on 3 June 1980 from a Marine Corps Douglas A-4M Skyhawk. The missile was the laser-guided version of the USAF’s air-to-ground Maverick with a heavier warhead. It was being developed by Hughes Aircraft Company for use by the Marine Corps in close-air support of combat troops.

On 25 October 1980, the historic Valparaiso Inn, which served as the Eglin Officers' Club during World War II, was destroyed by fire. It had remained vacant since another blaze severely damaged it on 2 March 1977.

In 1981 the original building housing the Air Force Armament Museum was condemned and the facility closed until 1984.

The Navy F/A-18 Hornet began climatic testing by the Air Force’s 3246th Test Wing at the McKinley Climatic Laboratory on 23 March 1981. The tests were designed to evaluate the F/A-18 airframe’s ability to withstand the wide range of temperatures and climatic conditions which the aircraft would experience in its everyday operations.

The Hughes YAH-64 underwent testing in the McKinley Climatic Laboratory from 2 November to 16 December 1981, consisting of 14.4 hours of operating time. The U.S. Army Aviation Engineering Flight Activity was responsible for the evaluation of aircraft systems and the U.S. Army Aviation Development Test Activity was responsible for the mission equipment evaluation. The U.S. Army formally accepted its first production AH-64A Apache in January 1984.

Southeastern Airlines, an Atlanta-based operation, commenced flights into Okaloosa Air Terminal on 15 November 1982. It was acquired by Atlantic Southeast Airlines, a Delta Connection carrier, on 1 April 1983.

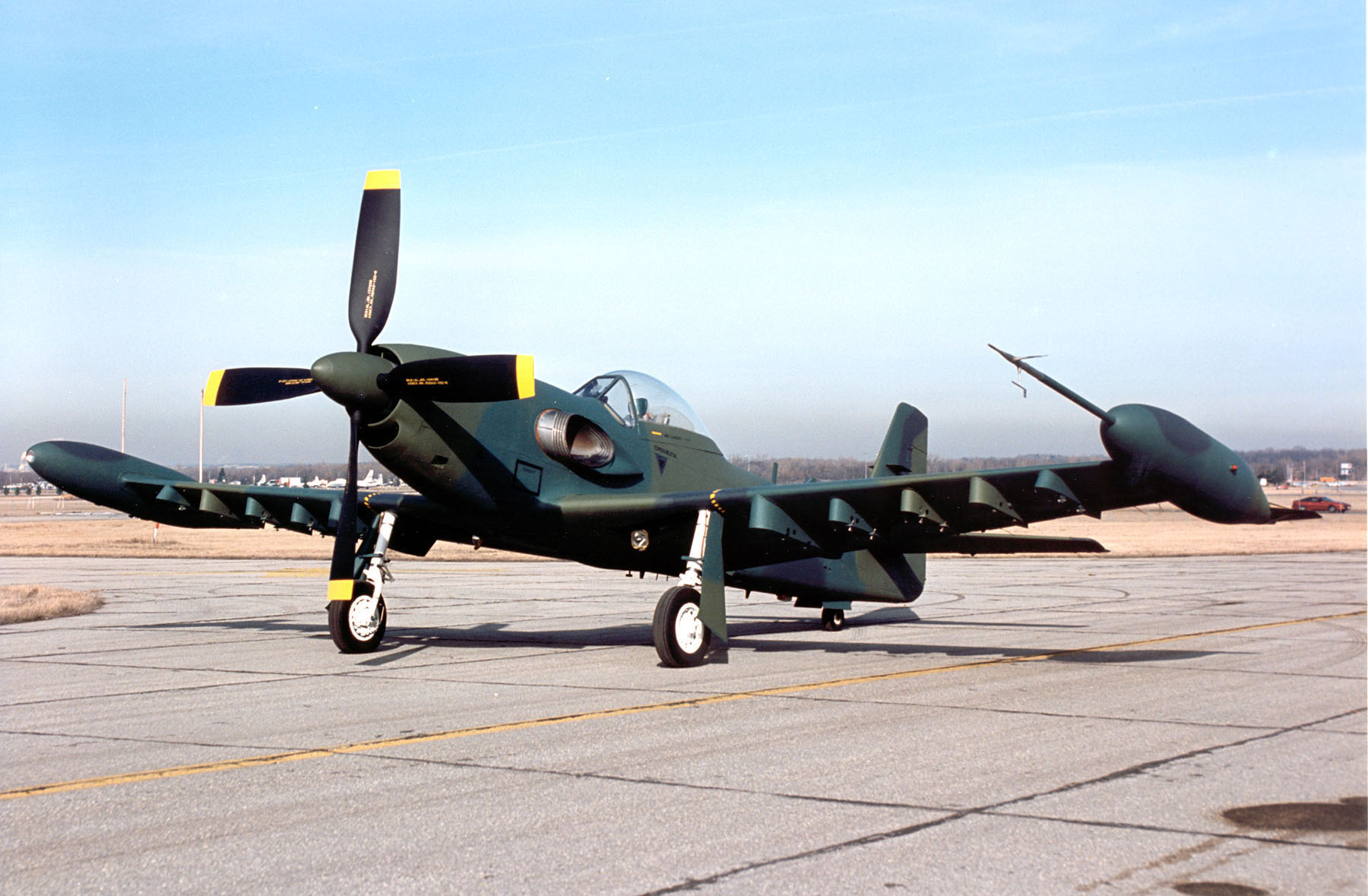
Despite performing the counter-insurgency tasks effectively, the Air Force chose not to acquire the Piper PA-48 Enforcer.

Two Piper PA-48 Enforcers were tested during 1983 and 1984 at Eglin AFB, and Edwards AFB, California. As in the Pave COIN tests of 1971, the PA-48s were found to perform well in their intended role for counter-insurgency, but the USAF again decided not to purchase the aircraft being apparently uninterested in adding tail-dragger propeller-driven aircraft to the inventory.

Construction began in 1984 on the Bob Hope Village, the only retirement facility that caters to enlisted military, opening in February 1985. Residents pay below market value for the 256 independent apartments. Col. Bob Gates, Bob Hope's USO pilot, was key in getting the comedian's support for the undertaking, as well as lending his name and prestige to the project. Hope was named an honorary board member of the foundation in 1978 and held benefit concerts for nearly two decades.

In November 1984, the Air Force Armament Museum reopened in a new 28,000-square-foot (2,600 m^{2}) building on State Highway 85.

The first two advanced Multi-Stage Improvement Program (MSIP) F-15 aircraft were delivered to the 33d TFW on 28 June 1985.

Republic Airlines, primary carrier at the Okaloosa Air Terminal, merged into Northwest Airlines on 31 July 1986. "In its last year as an independent entity, Republic employs 15,100 people serving a national network with a fleet of 168 DC9s, 727s, 757s and Convair 580s."

The 55th Aerospace Rescue and Recovery Squadron, equipped with HC-130 Hercules, was redesignated the 55th Special Operations Squadron on 1 March 1988, relinquishing its four-engine transports at this time.

On 24 June 1988, the US Navy opened its new facility for the Navy Explosive Ordnance Disposal School at Eglin AFB, relocated from Indian Head, Maryland.

On 4 May 1989, the AIM-120A advanced medium-range air-to-air, or AMRAAM, passed its final flight test for use on U.S. fighters. The AIM-120A demonstrated its ability to achieve multiple targets. On the Gulf Test Range near Eglin Air Force Base, an F-15 Eagle fired two missiles at two QF-100 drones at 10,000 feet (3,000 m) and two more at two drones at 5,000 feet (1,500 m). The test resulted in three direct hits and one pass within lethal distance. More than 200 of the test missiles were launched during flight tests at Eglin AFB; White Sands Missile Range, New Mexico; and NAS Point Mugu, California.

"Following the collapse of the Communist regime in East Germany in 1989, elements of the East German Volksarmee were integrated into the German armed forces. The dowry of the enforced marriage brought another mass of Soviet-built equipment. Of particular interest were the various SAM systems now available, complete with trained operating crews.

"At the firing range near Ramstein in southern Germany, western technical experts looked on as the radar operators endeavored to track German, British, French, and US tactical aircraft flying jamming runs against their systems. Afterwards, an eight-man ex-Volksarmee operating team with an SA-8 came to Eglin AFB, to conduct a series of fully instrumented tests there."

== Operation Desert Storm ==
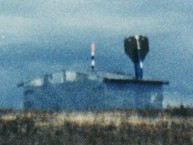
Eglin Air Force Base tested the first flight of a GPS Joint Direct Attack Munition guided weapon on 10 February 1993.

Following Saddam Hussein's August 1990 invasion of Kuwait, 24 F-15s of the 58th Fighter Squadron, 33d Fighter Wing, under the command of Colonel Rick Parsons, departed Eglin for King Faisal Air Base, Saudi Arabia as part of the build up of coalition forces in Operations Desert Shield and Desert Storm. In the early morning hours of 17 January 1991, Operation Desert Storm commenced. Captain John J. B. Kelk claimed the first aerial victory by downing the first MiG-29. As the war progressed, the 58th flew 1,689 combat sorties and destroyed 15 other enemy aircraft. During the course of the war, the 58th accomplished feats that no other coalition member matched including: the most air-to-air kills, the most double kills, and the most sorties and hours flown by any F-15 unit in theater. The 58th also destroyed the most MiG-29s (a total of five) and had the only wing commander who had an air-to-air victory.

The GAR-4A Falcon missile returned to the USAF test inventory in the early 1990s. During an unusual test, an F-15 Eagle engaged a C-141 Starlifter, (61-2777), over the Eglin AFB range with four GAR-4As. The F-15 launched the GAR-4As outside of their effective range to evaluate the Starlifter’s Missile Approach Warning System (MAWS). The purpose of the test was to evaluate the ability of the MAWS to detect an incoming missile and activate countermeasures systems.

On 19 February 1991, the 3246th Test Wing conducted a short notice test to certify the GBU-28/B “Bunker Buster,” developed in only eight weeks, on the F-111 for immediate deployment for Desert storm.

On 9 July 1991, Lockheed F-117A, 84-0824, c/n A.4038, was flown to Eglin for climatic testing. The aircraft was prepped and then installed in the chamber using special fixtures and tooling designed to allow simulation of conditions in flight. Testing began under cold weather conditions (−40 °F ambient) on 15 July 1991, and continued through conditions of snow loading, blowing snow, hail, freezing rain, ice and fog, hot weather (140 °F ambient), water intrusion testing, and concluded in January 1992 with tropical rain and human factors evaluations. Cold soaks to −60 °F and 160 °F were also included. A typical mission "flown" included pre-flight, pilot ingress, APU and engine start, full power takeoff, cruise, systems operation and weapon delivery, landing, pilot egress, and post flight inspection. Aircraft maintenance was performed and evaluated throughout the testing sequence.

On 13 August 1991 ground was broken for a new 14-story air traffic control tower that would replace the older and less capable tower attached to the King Hangar.

On 1 October 1991, the USAF Tactical Air Warfare Center, activated on 1 November 1963, is re-designated as the USAF Air Warfare Center.

Following bombing difficulties in Operation Desert Storm, the Air Force sought an all-weather "smart" bomb that could work regardless of smoke, fog, dust, and cloud cover, with research, development, testing and evaluation (RDT&E) of an "adverse weather precision guided munition" beginning in 1992. Several proposals were considered, including a radical concept that used GPS. To identify the technical risk associated with an INS/GPS guided weapon, the Air Force created in early 1992 a rapid-response High Gear program called the "JDAM Operational Concept Demonstration" (OCD) at Eglin Air Force Base. Honeywell, Interstate Electronics Corporation, Sverdrup Technology, and McDonnell Douglas were hired to help the 46th Test Wing demonstrate the feasibility of a GPS weapon within one year. The OCD program fitted a GBU-15 guided bomb with an INS/GPS guidance kit and on 10 February 1993, dropped the first INS/GPS weapon from an Air Force F-16 on a target 88,000 feet (27 km) downrange. Five more tests were run in various weather conditions, altitudes, and ranges. The OCD program demonstrated an 11-meter Circular Error Probable (CEP).

== Modern era ==
During a 1992 reorganization, the Air Force disestablished Eglin's parent major command, Air Force Systems Command (AFSC) and merged its functions with the former Air Force Logistics Command (AFLC). The newly created major command from this merger, Air Force Materiel Command (AFMC), remains Eglin's parent command to this day. The Development Test Center, Eglin's host unit, became part of AFMC on 30 June 1992. The 46th Test Wing replaced the 3246th Test Wing on 1 October 1992 and the 40th Test Squadron replaced the 3247th Test Squadron the same date.

In July 1992, a Bell Boeing MV-22 Osprey prototype concluded four months of tests in the McKinley Climatic Laboratory. Unfortunately, on 20 July, this airframe crashed at MCAS Quantico, Virginia, after a flight from Eglin, killing 5 crew members in front of an audience of high-ranking US government officials, the first of a series of fatal accidents involving the controversial tiltrotor aircraft. A U.S. Navy Court of Inquiry (COI) concluded that the aircraft "experienced multiple emergencies upon entering the downwind" and that "the primary cause of the mishap was a flammable [sic] fluid leak which was ingested by the right engine."

On 31 October 1992, the first U.S. Air Force McDonnell Douglas C-17 Globemaster III to deploy to a base outside of California completed a 4.2-hour, 1,870-mile (3,010 km) flight to Eglin Air Force Base. The third production aircraft flew from Edwards AFB to the Florida base where it underwent pressurization and temperature control tests inside the climatic test facility. The tests were expected to last five to six months, after which it was to return to the flight test program at Edwards.

On 25 March 1993, the 55th Special Operations Squadron, equipped with Sikorsky MH-60 Black Hawks, was reassigned from Eglin Main Base to Hurlburt Field, where it would remain until its inactivation on 11 November 1999.

From 29 March 1993 and into 1994, a series of live fire tests were conducted at Eglin by the second developmental Sea Harrier FRS Mk.2, XZ439, of the Royal Navy, using AIM-120 AMRAAM missiles. This was the first non-U.S. aircraft to live fire the AMRAAM. This airframe is now privately preserved on the U.S. register as N94422.

In 1993, B-2A Block 10 Spirit, 82-1070, AV-5, "The Spirit of Ohio", endured over 1,000 hours of extensive temperature testing at the McKinley Climatic Laboratory at Eglin AFB. It was given the second nick-name "Fire and Ice". This name was painted on the nose gear door. This component was donated to the National Museum of the United States Air Force at Wright-Patterson AFB, Ohio, in 1999, and installed on the test B-2 airframe displayed there.

The USAF test facilities at Eglin were heavily involved in the F-15 AUP (Avionics Upgrade Program) for the Israeli Air Force that integrated the AIM-120 Advanced Medium-Range Air-to-Air Missile (AMRAAM) in the mid-1990s.

On 10 August 1994 construction began on the All Conflicts' Veterans War Memorial on the site of the old POW/MIA memorial on the western end of Eglin Boulevard. The memorial was dedicated on 15 August 1995.

On 1 October 1995, Headquarters Air Combat Command consolidated the USAF Air Warfare Center, Eglin Air Force Base, with the inactive 53d Tactical Fighter Group, and it was re-designated as the 53d Wing.

A 5,000-pound terrorist bomb destroyed the Khobar Towers near Dhahran, Saudi Arabia on 26 June 1996, killing 19 U.S. servicemen including 12 assigned to the 33d Fighter Wing.

Fully remodelled and renovated at the cost of $72 million, the McKinley Climatic Laboratory reopened in June 1997.

On 21 November 1997, the Air Force announced the planned deployment of an Air Expeditionary Force (AEF) to Southwest Asia, including 12 F-15C Eagles from the 33d Fighter Wing.

In 1998, as part of the Air Forces' strategic plan to guide the service into the 21st century, the Air Force Development Test Center became the Air Force Materiel Command's Air Armament Center (AAC), responsible for development, acquisition, testing, and fielding all air-delivered weapons.

The Eglin Field Historic District, a U.S. historic district, was so designated as such on 22 October 1998, and is bounded by Barranca, Choctawhatchee, 4th, and "F" Avenues. It contains 20 historic buildings.

Naval School Explosive Ordnance Disposal (NAVSCOLEOD), a Navy-managed command, jointly staffed by Army, Navy, Air Force, and Marine Corps personnel, had its official ribbon cutting on a new consolidated training facility in April 1999. These five new buildings, which centralize all basic EOD training at Eglin, total 117,000 square feet (10,900 m^{2}) and were built at a cost of $16.2 million. NAVSCOLEOD’s additional facilities are located just inside the east gate, including a three building, 252 room bachelor quarters complex, a second training facility located in Building 845, and an extensive practical training facility on Range D-51. Three demolition training areas at Ranges D-51 and C-52 West, and C-52 North, a training aid and facilities maintenance compound and six explosive storage magazines are also part of the school’s facilities.

To commemorate those EOD Technicians that have given the last full measure in performance of their duty, the EOD Memorial Foundation was created in 1969 by a group of volunteers. The construction of the EOD Memorial was started that same year at Indian Head Naval Ordnance Station, Maryland, home of the first Naval School of Explosive Ordnance Disposal. The Memorial is composed of four cenotaphs, one for each branch of the armed forces, with a bronze tablet inscribed with the names of those EOD technicians who lost lives in line of duty. In 1999, the memorial was relocated to Eglin AFB, across the street from the now relocated EOD School.

As part of the military drawdown in the 1990s, the Air Force inactivated the 33d Fighter Wing's 59th Fighter Squadron on 15 April 1999. The wing lost six aircraft and consolidated the remaining aircraft into the 58th and 60th Fighter Squadrons. Originally selected for inactivation in 1997, Air Force officials delayed the decision in recognition of the Nomads connection with Khobar Towers. The 59th reactivated as the 59th Test and Evaluation Squadron on 3 December 2004, at Nellis Air Force Base, Nevada. The 59th falls under the 53rd Test Management Group at Eglin.

The 55th Special Operations Squadron at Hurlburt Field was inactivated on 11 November 1999.

On 16 December 1999, an F-15D Eagle of the 33d Fighter Wing became the first F-15 in the Air Force's inventory to log 6,000 flying hours.

Under Project Linked Seas, a NATO exercise, conducted between 1 May and 12 May 2000, two missions were flown by RPV RQ-4Q Global Hawk, AV-4, 98-2004, from Eglin AFB to Portugal.

From June to August 2002, F-22A Block 10 Raptor, 91-4004, c/n 4004, was tested in the McKinley Climatic Laboratory. The aircraft arrived from Langley AFB, Virginia, on 30 May 2002, piloted by Maj. Colin Miller, 36, of Falls Church, Virginia.

Given the initial tasking 10 September 2002, experts from the Air Armament Center, Air Force Operational Test and Evaluation Center, Air Force Research Laboratory Munitions Directorate and 53rd Wing developed, tested and delivered the new CBU-107 Passive Attack Weapon by December. The weapon’s full production was completed 9 March 2003. The Air Force used the new weapon following a 98-day, $40 million development program.

Lockheed Martin successfully conducted the first test flight of a prototype NetFires Loitering Attack Missile (LAM) at Eglin Air Force Base, on 11 November 2002. The LAM vertically launched flawlessly, transitioned to stable flight and performed several maneuvers during the short flight test. Test objectives were successfully achieved. The Lockheed Martin-designed LAM was flown without a Laser Radar (LADAR) seeker or warhead. A solid rocket motor vertically launched the 7-inch (180 mm), 100-pound missile from a closed breach canister mounted in a Lockheed Martin prototype launcher. Control surfaces and a pivoting wing deployed as planned as the missile began its programmed ascent-phase roll and pitch maneuver. Protective covers on the forward dome, scoring camera and turbojet inlet were ejected properly and engine start sequence began as scheduled. Turbojet ignition sequence completed approximately five seconds after launch, and the engine came up to speed as the prototype approached apogee. For the next eight minutes, the LAM prototype executed preprogrammed maneuvers over the Eglin test range, demonstrating impressive stability and validating aerodynamic performance, navigation and autopilot performance design parameters.

The GBU-43/B MOAB bomb was first at Eglin Air Force Base, in 2003.

In May 2003, seven Luftwaffe MiG-29A Fulcrums of Jagdgeschwader 73, visited Eglin to participate in Sniper 2003 training exercises, staging to the United States through Keflavik, Iceland. This was the MiGs' last major deployment before being dropped from the German Air Force. They were 29+02, 29+06, 29+08, 29+10, 29+14, 29+15 and 29+19. 29+10 carried special markings that read "Fulcrum Farewell USA 2003". The Eastern Bloc aircraft flew training and secret missions with and against U.S. military units of the Air Force, Air National Guard, and U.S. Navy. Live missile launches were made against aerial targets, including BQM-34 Firebees, over the extensive water ranges.

The X-43A-LS low-speed demonstrator underwent testing out of Auxiliary Field 6 in November 2003.

From 2004, the Team Eglin Miniature Munitions Systems Group conducted development and testing of the GBU-39 Small Diameter Bomb, the fastest major acquisition program in Eglin history.

In February 2004, the Classic Jets Aircraft Association held its annual convention at Eglin AFB. No Kum-Sok, the North Korean pilot who defected in a MiG-15bis to South Korea in 1953, the first of the type to be acquired and evaluated by the West, was a guest of honor and received his first MiG ride since his defection in a Polish-built MiG-15UTI two-seat trainer owned by the Red Star Aviation Museum.

Textron Systems announced on 13 September 2004 that its BLU-108 Sensor Fuzed Submunition was successfully dropped at Eglin Air Force Base from the DRS Sentry HP Unmanned Aerial Vehicle (UAV), resulting in multiple target hits. The test demonstrated the capability of weaponizing small, FCS Class II-category UAVs to engage multiple target threats. The U.S. Air Force's UAV Battle Lab sponsored the Sentry HP UAV/BLU-108 drop test, with participation by the USAF Sensor Fuzed Weapon (SFW) Project Office at Eglin AFB, Florida and the U.S. Army's Aviation & Missile Research Development & Engineering Center (AMRDEC) at Redstone Arsenal, Alabama. Lt. Col. Richard Mountain, the Sensor Fuzed Weapon Squadron Commander at Eglin AFB, stated, "The cooperation between the various Air Force organizations and Army Lab at Redstone Arsenal, along with the BLU-108 submunition's adaptability to other carriers, ensured the UAV demonstration would be a success. The BLU-108 brings a great deal of proven capability to the war fighter."

The first upgraded A-10C Thunderbolt II, 81-0989, c/n A10-0684, made its debut flight at Eglin on 20 January 2005, piloted by Maj. Trey Rawls, of the 40th Flight Test Squadron.

In September 2005, a Raytheon Hawker Horizon business jet underwent testing in the McKinley Climatic Laboratory.

In July 2006, Eglin AFB was recognized as the 2005 Complex of the Year for maintaining the most complex airspace and airfield with many runways and moving parts. "Eglin supports five million square yards of pavement used by six wings, five major commands, six civilian airlines, and the Army and the Navy."

The Lockheed Martin Sniper XR Advanced Targeting Pod successfully demonstrated compatibility with the launch of a Maverick missile from an adjacent A-10C wing pylon at Eglin in August 2006. The test was conducted by the U.S. Air Force’s 46th Test Wing, 40th Flight Test Squadron at Eglin. The Sniper ATP was mounted on an A-10C Precision Engagement aircraft adjacent to the Maverick missile mounted on the LAU-88 missile rail. In this configuration, Sniper ATP is approximately 15 inches (380 mm) from the missile body. Test pilots from the 40th Test Squadron, and the 422nd Test Squadron at Nellis AFB, Nevada, reported that they were impressed with the ATP’s performance during the developmental and operational flight tests of the A-10C. The A-10C’s avionics upgrade and targeting pod integration are part of the Precision Engagement (PE) program, led by Lockheed Martin Systems Integration-Owego in New York.

On 29 September 2006, RAF BAE Systems Nimrod MRA4 PA-2, ZJ518, arrived at Eglin Air Force Base after its first transatlantic flight. In the second half of October 2006 PA-2 spent ten days at temperatures as low as -40 °C (-40 °F) in the McKinley Climatic Laboratory at Eglin AFB. The aircraft also completed high-temperature trials at the same facility, operating in temperatures up to 44 °C (110 °F) and 100% relative humidity. ZJ518 returned to BAE Systems/Woodford on 16 November 2006, via the Azores.

In December 2006, a "fast cook-off" test, the largest ever at Eglin AFB, was conducted when a rocket motor was engulfed in 28,000 gallons of burning jet fuel as part of a hazard assessment.

Anonymous all-white Boeing C-32B or Boeing 757-23A aircraft, utilized in support of the U.S. State Department Foreign Emergency Support Team as well as other agencies, have operated out of Eglin Main in the post 9/11 era. One source ascribes these aircraft as being the sole asset of the 486th Flight Test Squadron.

The Naval Air Systems Command (NAVAIR) announced that a test of a U.S. Navy Tomahawk Block IV cruise missile was conducted on 17 January 2007, from USS Donald Cook, an Arleigh Burke-class destroyer underway in the Gulf of Mexico sea ranges off the coast of the Florida panhandle. Seconds after launch from the ship's vertical launch system, the Tomahawk missile transitioned to cruise flight. It flew a fully guided 645-nautical-mile (1,195 km) test flight using global positioning satellite and digital scene matching area correlator navigation. The one-hour, 30-minute flight concluded at a target and recovery site on the Eglin Air Force Base land range.

In February 2007, a U.S. Navy Tomahawk cruise missile was launched from USS Boise, a Los Angeles-class submarine that was under way in the Gulf of Mexico. Seconds after launch, the Tomahawk transitioned to cruise flight. It flew a fully guided 613-nautical-mile (1,135 km) test flight to the Eglin AFB's land test range where it executed a simulated programmed warhead detonation followed by a parachute recovery. Total flight time to target was one hour, 27 minutes.

On 17 April 2007, a U.S. Navy Tomahawk Block IV cruise missile was vertically launched by USS Winston S. Churchill, in the Gulf of Mexico and completed a successful test. The launched missile executed a Vertical Dive Maneuver attack on the Eglin H-Target complex on the test range. Seconds after launch from USS Winston S. Churchill, the test-configured Tomahawk transitioned to cruise flight. The missile successfully flew approximately 645 nautical miles (1,195 km) using GPS-only navigation which provided navigation updates en route to the target site. Safety chase aircraft were provided by the Air Force 46th Test Wing's 40th Flight Test Squadron, based here. Chase aircraft were flown by a combined Air Force and Navy crew from the 40th FLTS and from the Navy VX-30 and VX-31 test squadrons, based at the Naval Air Warfare Center Weapons Division test centers at Point Mugu and China Lake, California.

Lockheed C-5M Galaxy, 86-0013, c/n 500-0099, underwent extensive testing in the McKinley Climatic Laboratory from 21 October to 17 November 2007, the first time since 1969 that a C-5 had been contained completely inside the hangar and the first time in the history of the laboratory that a C-5's engines were run while in the hangar. This capability enables developmental testing on an aircraft with full weather predictability. This was the first Galaxy upgraded to C-5M standard, rolled out at Lockheed Marietta on 16 May 2006 and first flown on 19 June 2006.

In 2012, Air Combat Command requested the testing of a 600-gallon external fuel tank which would extend the Fairchild-Republic A-10's loitering time by 45–60 minutes; flight testing of such a tank had been conducted in 1997, but did not involve combat evaluation. Over 30 flight tests were conducted by the 40th Flight Test Squadron to gather data on the aircraft's handling characteristics and performance across different load configurations. The tank slightly reduced stability in the yaw axis, however there is no decrease in aircraft tracking performance.

The Bombardier CS-100 flight test vehicle 2 (FTV2), C-GWYD, underwent a month of tests in the McKinley Climatic Laboratory in April 2014.

Due to budget cuts, the contract services for the Eglin base library were terminated and the facility closed on 30 April 2014 until further notice.

Airbus A350 XWB, F-WWCF, msn. 2, was given two and a half weeks of climatic tests in the McKinley Climatic Laboratory in May 2014, and was subjected to multiple climatic and humidity settings from a high of 45 deg. C. to as low as -40 deg. C.

Eglin's east-west runway 12/30 was closed on 1 May 2015 to allow upgrading of aircraft arresting systems from obsolete BAK-9 systems to MB-100 textile brake systems. The BAK-9s were the last systems in operational USAF service. All flight operations used the north-south runway 1/19. The runway work was completed in August 2015. "Closing Runway 12/30 may slightly increase noise over Valparaiso for a few months," said Mark Pohlmeier, acting deputy assistant secretary of the Air Force for installations, in a news release. Further, 15 F-35Cs that are part of the Navy's backup aircraft inventory (BAI) are temporarily assigned at Eglin from May 2015 while construction upgrades are underway at Naval Air Station Lemoore, California, their future base. That work is expected to be completed in about three years.

Ford Motor Company was the McKinley Climatic Laboratory's customer for three weeks in August 2015, beginning 7 August. Engineers from Ford's headquarters in Flint, Michigan, and from Mexico arrived to test everything from the smallest Fiesta to the largest Super Duty trucks. Ford has been testing here for a decade, and has contracts for the next three years. The lab's schedule is almost full through 2020. About half of the tests are government, the rest private firms.
