= P. F. Volland Company =

Publishing house in Chicago, Illinois, USA from 1908 to 1959

- Status: Defunct
- Founded: 1908
- Founder: Paul Frederick Volland
- Successor: Shaw Barton Company
- Country of origin: United States
- Headquarters location: Chicago, Illinois
- Publication types: Books, greeting cards, music, calendars, games

P. F. Volland Company was an American publishing company based in Chicago, Illinois. It published poetry books, greeting cards, music, children's books, calendars, cookbooks, and children's occupational games, between 1908 and 1959. The press was noted for using new printing processes, including off-set printing techniques, and color illustrations. The company published the works of many significant artists and writers.

== Founder ==
Paul Frederick John Volland Hughes Phelps (April 24, 1875 – May 5, 1919) was a 20th century publisher, and the founder of the P. F. Volland Company. In 1908, he would become the founder of the P. F. Volland Company, which would work to publish poetry books, greeting cards, music, children's books, calendars, cookbooks, and children's occupational games, all between 1908 and 1959. He also became a publisher during the time period following the foundation of the company. In 1917, Volland would publish the book New Adventures of Alice, made by John Rae. On May 5, 1919, Volland was shot and killed by Vera Trepagnier in a business dispute in the Volland offices.

== Volland Ideal ==
The Volland Ideal was used to market P. F. Volland's lines of children's books. The Volland Ideal was "that books should make children happy and build character unconsciously and should contain nothing to cause fright, suggest fear, glorify mischief, excuse malice or condone cruelty."

== History ==
Christmas cards were added as a product line in 1909.

After 1912, the firm had offices in the Monroe Building (across the street from the Art Institute), which were designed by the well-known architect Walter Burley Griffin. Griffin also had offices in the Monroe Building and his wife, architect Marion Mahony Griffin, provided illustrations for some of P. F. Volland's greeting cards.

In 1916, the firm moved to a new space in the Garland Building, 58 East Washington Street, Chicago, Illinois.

In 1917, the company was incorporated in Delaware.

In 1919, the firm participated in the Victory Loan drive organized by the Liberty Loan Committee for the Publishing, Printing, Advertising, and Allied Interests.

Frederick J. Clampitt, who had been a silent partner and an executive member of the firm since 1916, became president of P. F. Volland after Paul Volland's death in 1919. Other officers of the company in 1919 were W. R. Anderson, vice president; H. S. Adams, secretary; Edwin J. Clampitt, assistant treasurer; James R. Offield, member of board of directors; Maurice Berkson, member of board of directors. J. P. McEvoy headed up the editorial department.

The New York representative of the firm was Francis H. Evans. In 1929, the New York representative of the firm was Harry A. Moore.

The P. F. Volland Company merged with the Gerlach Barlow Company in 1924 and moved some of its offices to the Gerlach Barlow Building in Joliet, Illinois. The Volland brand name continued to be used for Volland products. The Volland offices at 58 E. Washington in Chicago, Illinois were retained and sold both the Volland and Gerlach Barlow lines.

After World War II, Volland produced greeting cards for the emerging African American market.

By 1935, the book titles published by Volland were acquired by other publishers, including Wise Book Company and M.A. Donahue.

The Shaw Barton Company, a competitor of the Gerlach Barlow Company, purchased the company in 1959 and closed down the Joliet operation.

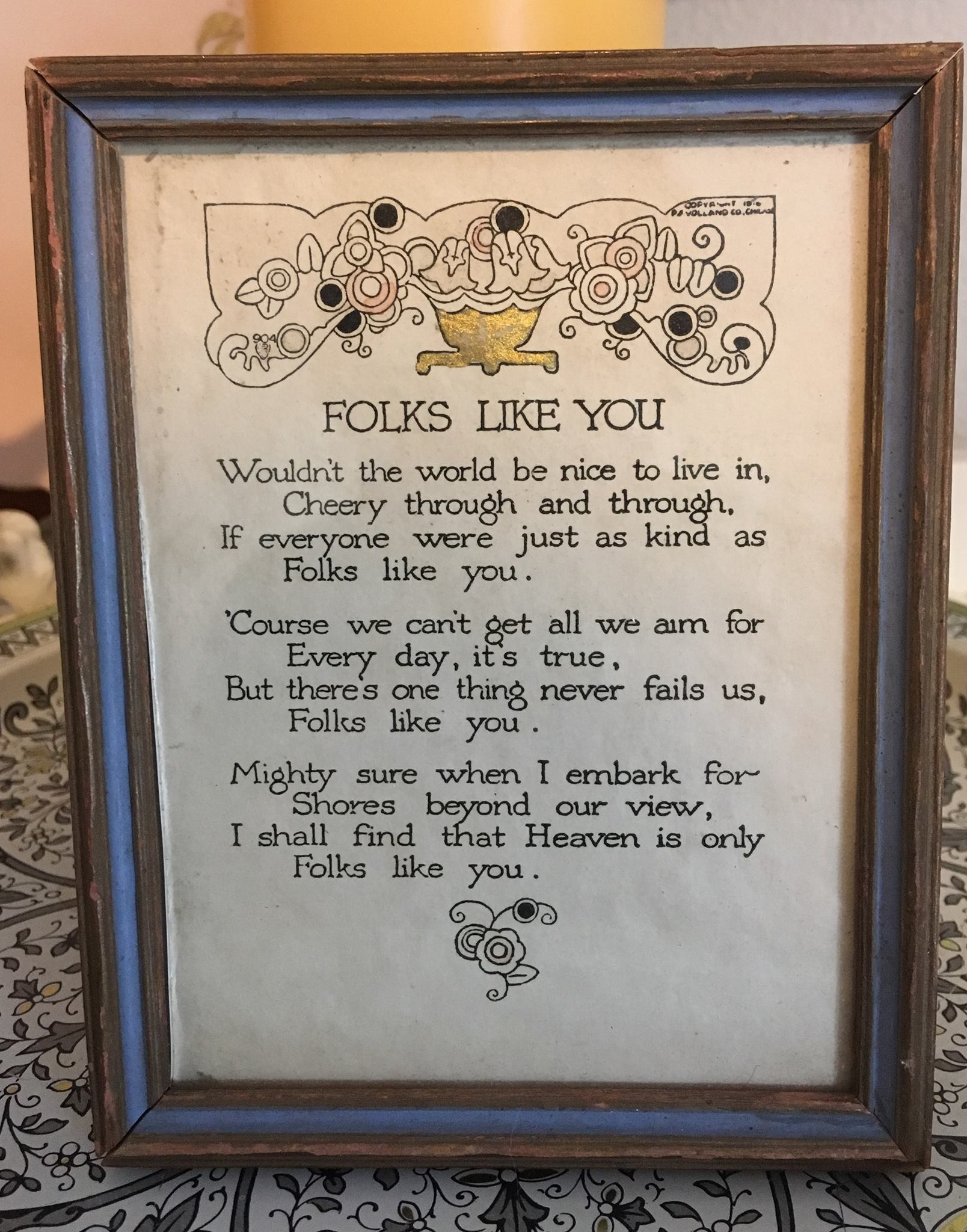
An example of framed poetry from the PF Volland Co., dated 1916.

== Authors and illustrators of the P.F. Volland Co. ==
Volland hired many significant early 20th century artists and writers. Many worked as freelancers.

- Sarah Addington
- Ottillie Amend
- Alice Cooper Bailey
- Henry Turner Bailey
- Temple Bailey
- Maginel Wright Barney
- Eleanore Barte
- Mary R. Bassett
- Clara Doty Bates
- L. Frank Baum
- Betty Baxter
- Frances Beem
- Erick Berry
- John Gabbert Bowman
- Claire A. Briggs
- Philip Broughton
- Carmen L. Browne
- Thornton W. Burgess
- Edgar Rice Burroughs
- Bonibel Butler
- George Frank Butler
- Ve Elizabeth Cadie
- Eleanor Campbell
- Lang Campbell
- Ruth Campbell
- Lewis Carroll
- William Herbert Carruth
- Russell Gordon Carter
- Gertrud Caspari
- Madison Cawein
- Ethel Clere Chamberlin
- Padraic Colum
- Nancy Cox McCormack
- Elizabeth T. Corbett
- Frank Crane
- Pauline Croll
- Gladys Signey Crouch
- Alice Ross Culver
- Gertrude K. Day
- Katherine Sturges Dodge
- Carrie Dudley
- Mary Ellsworth
- Rachel Robinson Elmer
- Georgene Faulkner
- Eveline Foland
- James W. Foley
- Marion Foster
- Fontaine Fox
- Frances Margaret Fox
- Ellery Friend
- John Archer Gee
- Elisa Leypold Good
- Elizabeth Gordon
- Douglas Grant
- Marion Mahony Griffin
- Edwin Osgood Grover
- Eulalie Osgood Grover
- Johnny Gruelle
- Justin C. Gruelle
- Mercer Gruelle
- Molly Anderson Haley
- Maude McGehee Hankins
- Muriel E. Halstead
- Julia Dyar Hardy
- Ruby Hart
- Dick Hartley
- Louise Marshall Haynes
- John Held, Jr.
- Helen West Heller
- Arthur Henderson
- D. Henderson
- Charlotte B. Herr
- Alice Higgins
- Elizabeth O. Hiller
- Caroline Hofman
- Holling C. Holling
- Lucille Webster Holling
- R. S. Hubbell
- Eleanore Mineah Hubbard
- Carrie Jacobs-Bond
- Norman Jacobsen
- May Justus
- Ilona de Karekjarto
- Gertrude Alice Kay
- Alexander Key
- L. Kirby-Parrish
- Edith Brown Kirkwood
- S. E. Kiser
- Clayton Knight
- C. L. Kohler
- Tom Lamb
- W. T. Larned
- Ring W. Lardner
- Jeanette Lawrence
- Ella Dolbear Lee
- Michael Lipman
- Albert Edgar Lownes
- William Briggs MacHarg
- Douglas Malloch
- Marion Mahony Griffin
- George C. Mason
- J. P. McEvoy
- Jo McMahon
- John L. Mee
- Edna Merritt
- Mildred Plew Merryman
- Ervine Metzl
- Nellie Burget Miller
- Olive Beaupre Miller
- Edith Mitchell
- George William Mitchell
- Lebbus Mitchell
- Muriel Moscrip Mitchell
- P. Moscheowitz
- Gladys Nelson Muter
- Marie Honre Myers
- Wilbur D. Nesbit
- David McCheyne Newell
- June Norris
- Joseph Pierre Nuytenns
- Jane Ort
- Margerita Osborne
- John Edward Perkins
- M. C. Potter
- Edward Poucher
- Jane Priest
- Nina Wilcox Putnam
- John Rae
- Fletcher C. Ransom
- Margaret Thomsen Raymond
- Sybill Rebman
- Earl H. Reed
- Sidney Reid
- Frederick Richardson
- M. T. Ross
- Herman Rosse
- Ethel Rundquist
- Frederic L. Ryder
- Tony Sarg
- Anna M. Scott
- Janet Laura Scott
- Wilhelmina Seegmiller
- Charles Livingston Snell
- Fairmont Snyder
- Johanna Spyri
- Beatrice Stevens
- Robert Louis Stevenson
- Wilhelmina Stitch
- Charles H. Sylvester
- Kate S. Teetshorn
- Gustaf Tenggren
- Mabel Dunham Thayer
- Ruth Plumly Thompsen
- Pamela Mori Tigher
- Lew Tower
- Helen Van Valkenburgh
- Helen Vanderveer
- Dugald Stewart Walker
- Satella Waterstone
- Mary L. Watson
- Jessie Penniman White
- Lois Willoughby
- Dixie Willson
- Edward Arthur Wilson
- Isa L. Wright
- Annette Wynne

== Book series published by P.F. Volland ==
- Classics series
- Friendship series
- Golden Youth series
- Good Cheer series
- Happy Children series
- Hug Me Toy Books
- Jolly Jingle series
- Jolly Kid series
- Punky Dunk
- Philadelphia Ledger Newspaper Books
- Read Me A Story series
- Sunny Book series
- Volland "Fairy Children" series
- Volland Inglenook series
