= Plew =

Plew and Plews are surnames. Notable people with the names include:

== Plew ==
- James E. Plew (1862–1938), American businessman
- Mildred Plew Meigs (née Plew, 1892–1944), American poet
- Frieda Plew (1887–1974), German painter

== Plews ==
- Herb Plews (1928–2014), American baseball player
- Nigel Plews (1934–2008), English cricket umpire

== See also ==
- Plew, Missouri, an unincorporated community in Lawrence County
