= KVPS =

KVPS may refer to:

- Destin–Fort Walton Beach Airport (ICAO code KVPS)
- KVPS-LD, a low-power television station (channel 8) licensed to serve Indio, California, United States
