= Bonnibel Butler =

American children's book illustrator

Bonnibel Butler Weston (September 22, 1885 – March 7, 1983) was an American children's book illustrator in the early 20th century. She also provided designs and illustrations for magazines, like St. Nicholas.

== Personal life ==
Butler was born in Frankfort, Michigan. Her father, Digby Bell Butler, was a lumber salesman. In 1916, she married Frederick Weston in Frankfort. The couple had a son, Frederick Jr., and two daughters, Nancy and Ruth. Frederick Jr. died of meningitis in 1930, aged 10. The youngest daughter, Ruth, married as her second husband New York State Senator Warren M. Anderson.

In 1948, her husband, who was working as the publicity director of Rosenbaum's department store in Pittsburgh, was killed in an automobile accident in that city. Bonnibel died in 1983 in Bridgeville, Pennsylvania.

== Career ==
Butler worked for the P. F. Volland Company. She illustrated William MacHarg's Let's Pretend, Some Adventures of the Golden Age of Nursery Land, which was published by Volland in 1914.

She called illustrating "perhaps the most fascinating occupation possible."

== Selected publications ==
- Butler, Bonnibel. The Baby's Record of Mental and Physical Growth and Her Horoscope. Chicago: Published by M.A. Donohue & Co, 1913. OCLC 122942227
- MacHarg, William with ill. by Butler Let's Pretend, Some Adventures of the Golden Age of Nursery Land P. F. Volland, 1914. OCLC 38329879
- Rice, Wallace, and Frances Rice with decorations by Butler. Cupids & Kisses; A Book of Delights. [Chicago]: M.A. Donohue & Co, 1914. OCLC 21628546
- Butler, Bonnibel. Mother Goose favorites. Chicago; New York: M.A. Dohohue & Co., 1930. OCLC 887730335
- Smith, Mary Estella; and Butler, Bonnibel. Holland Stories. New York: Rand, McNally, 1932. OCLC 2313276
