= Mildred Plew Meigs =

American poet

- Born: January 12, 1892; Chicago, Illinois, United States
- Died: February 22, 1944; Valparaiso, Florida, United States
- Occupation: Poet
- Spouse(s): Clifford Meigs, Carl Merryman (divorced 1935)
- Relatives: James E. Plew (father)
- Writing career
- Language: English

Mildred Plew Meigs (born Mildred Plew) was an American poet. Born to Chicago financier James E. Plew and Nettie Plew (née Raymond), Mildred spent her adult life in Valparaiso, Florida. She is most famous for her poem "The Pirate Don Durk of Dowdee", which she published in Child Life Magazine in a 1923 issue.

Her first published book, The Road To Raffydiddle, is dated 1913, and features illustrations by Frank Aloise.

She contributed dozens of poems to Child Life Magazine, Harper's, Motion Picture, Poetry, and other lifestyle magazines, and is credited as the author of six children's books.

Mildred Plew Meigs died on February 22, 1944, in her home in Valparaiso, Florida.

== Notable works ==
- Merryman, Mildred Plew, and Ve Elizabeth Cadie. Bonbon and Bonbonette. Chicago: Rand McNally & Co., 1924. OCLC 1057432653
- Merryman, Mildred Plew, and Mary Phipps. Quack Said Jerusha!. New York: Sears Pub. Co. Copyright 1930. OCLC 17607935
- Merryman, Mildred Plew. Riddle Book, etc. Akron, New York: Saffield Publishing Co, 1936. OCLC 1064157482
- The Pirate Don Durk of Dowdee
- Moon Song

== Personal life ==
Mildred Plew was raised in Chicago. In 1916, she married Carl Plummer Merryman.

They moved in 1923 with her father and family to Valparaiso, Florida. During these years she was prolifically published, both in magazines and with children's books, with illustrations provided by Ve Elizabeth Cadie.

Mildred Plew divorced Carl Merryman in 1935.

In the 1940 census, her spouse is listed as Clifford Meigs.

== Legacy ==
Plew's works have been featured in elementary school choral readings and educational literature.
