= Destin–Fort Walton Beach Airport =

Airport in Florida, United States

Destin–Fort Walton Beach Airport Eglin Air Force Base

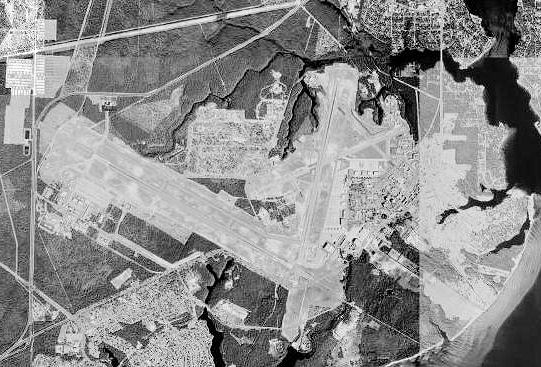
- USGS 1999 orthophoto
- IATA: VPS; ICAO: KVPS; FAA LID: VPS

Summary
- Airport type: Public / Military joint-use
- Owner/Operator: United States Air Force
- Serves: Destin-Fort Walton Beach, Florida, U.S.
- Location: Within Eglin Air Force Base, adjacent to Valparaiso, Florida, U.S.
- Operating base for: Allegiant Air
- Elevation AMSL: 87 ft (27 m)
- Coordinates: 30°29′00″N 086°31′31″W
- Website: www.FlyVPS.com

Maps
- FAA airport diagram
- Interactive map of Destin–Fort Walton Beach Airport

Runways
Direction	Length		Surface
Direction	ft	m	Surface
12/30	12,004	3,659	Asphalt/Concrete
02/20	10,012	3,052	Asphalt

Statistics (2025)
- Passengers: 2,491,886
- Aircraft operations: 21,640
- Source: Federal Aviation Administration

Destin–Fort Walton Beach Airport (IATA: VPS, ICAO: KVPS, FAA LID: VPS) is an airport located within Eglin Air Force Base, adjacent to the city of Valparaiso and near the cities of Destin and Fort Walton Beach, in Okaloosa County, Florida, United States. The airport was previously named Northwest Florida Regional Airport until February 17, 2015, and Okaloosa Regional Airport until September 2008.

The airport is just under 16 miles away from Destin and takes approximately 25 minutes to get to Destin. Only commercial air traffic is allowed. Non-commercial operations by general aviation and business aircraft must use nearby Destin Executive Airport.

== History ==
In 1957, The Okaloosa County Air Terminal opened on Eglin Air Force Base in building 89 with 3 personnel (Airport Manager, Security and Admin Support). Southern Airways was the only passenger airline, with Douglas DC-3s direct to Atlanta via several stops. Passengers entered the base through the East Gate near Valparaiso, thus the airport code of VPS. Southern would later upgrade their service into the airport with 40-passenger Martin 404 propliners before initiating the first scheduled passenger jet flights at VPS.

In 1967, Southern Airways introduced Douglas DC-9-10 jetliner service into VPS thus becoming the first airline to operate jets into the airport.

According to the September 3, 1968 Southern Airways system timetable, the airline was operating daily nonstop DC-9-10 jet service to Atlanta and New Orleans as well as direct, no change of plane DC-9 jet flights twice a day to New York City LaGuardia Airport and Washington D.C. Dulles Airport via intermediate stops in Dothan, AL and Columbus, GA.

The new James E. Plew Terminal Building of the Okaloosa Air Terminal, on State Road 85, opened in mid-February 1975, with dedication on 22 February. Representative Bob Sikes and Southern Airways President Frank Hulse were some of the speakers. The 32,000 sq ft (3,000 m2) facility cost $1.7 million. Federal grants totaled $472,000, state $80,000, Okaloosa County bond sale $1.1 million, and Southern Airways $190,000. First year enplaned passengers totaled 97,000 with Southern Airways as the sole airline serving VPS with 12 departing flights daily.

In 1977, South Central Air Transport (SCAT), a commuter air carrier, was serving the airport with flights to New Orleans, LA, Mobile, AL, Montgomery, AL and Panama City, FL flown with Handley Page Jetstream propjets.

On July 1, 1979 Southern Airways merged with North Central Airlines to form Republic Airlines. In July 1979, Republic flew Douglas DC-9-10 and McDonnell Douglas DC-9-30 jets nonstop from VPS to Atlanta, GA; Dothan, AL; Mobile, AL; New Orleans, LA; Orlando, FL and Tallahassee, FL. Republic also operated direct DC-9 jet service to Baton Rouge, LA; Chicago, IL (O'Hare Airport), Fort Lauderdale, FL; Memphis, TN; Monroe, LA; New York (LaGuardia Airport) and Washington D.C. (Dulles Airport). Prior to the merger Southern flew all of these nonstop and direct DC-9 routes as well and also operated direct DC-9 jet service to Birmingham, AL; Miami, FL and Nashville, TN.

At the beginning of the 1980s, only Republic Airlines was operating nonstop service between VPS and Atlanta. Republic was operating DC-9-10, DC-9-30 and DC-9-50 jets on the route. As the decade progressed, Delta Air Lines and Eastern Air Lines both added nonstop service between the airport and Atlanta via their respective regional airline code sharing partners, Delta Connection and Eastern Metro Express, both of which operated turboprop aircraft into VPS. The Delta Connection service was flown by Atlantic Southeast Airlines (ASA) operating de Havilland Canada DHC-7 Dash 7 and Embraer EMB-120 Brasilia turboprops. The Eastern Metro Express service was flown by Metro Airlines operating British Aerospace BAe Jetstream 31 and de Havilland Canada DHC-8-100 Dash 8 turboprops. Air New Orleans, a commuter airline, also served VPS during the 1980s with commuter aircraft such as the Beechcraft C99 turboprop and Piper prop aircraft. Destinations served by Air New Orleans from VPS included Birmingham, AL; Mobile, AL; New Orleans, LA; Orlando, FL; Panama City, FL; Pensacola, FL and Tampa, FL.

On October 1, 1986, Northwest Airlines completed its merger with Republic Airlines. Northwest flew only one route from VPS: nonstop to Memphis, a Northwest hub which was also a former Republic and Southern Airways hub. By September 1987 Northwest had four non-stops a day to Memphis with stretched McDonnell Douglas DC-9-30 and DC-9-50s. Later Northwest would reduce its schedule from VPS to three daily DC-9s nonstop to Memphis. No other airline flew jets into VPS until Valujet/Airtran appeared in the 1990s.

AirTran Airways was serving the airport with jet service in 1998. According to the August 1, 1998 AirTran system timetable, two nonstop flights a day were operated to Atlanta with direct, one stop service once a day to Washington, D.C. Dulles Airport. AirTran operated McDonnell Douglas DC-9-30 jetliners into VPS. However, by the end of 2001, AirTran had ceased all service into the airport after commencing service to Pensacola.

The current Northwest Florida Regional Airport opened its doors in November 2004 following an expansion with more parking, a larger aircraft parking apron, a second parallel taxiway, landscaping and a new 110,000 sq ft (10,000 m^{2}) passenger terminal.

Delta Air Lines completed its merger with Northwest Airlines on January 31, 2010. Delta then scaled back the Northwest hub operation in Memphis, and service between VPS and MEM was discontinued in favor of nonstop flights to Delta's hub in Atlanta.

In 2011, Vision Airlines began a small scheduled passenger hub operation at VPS with flights to Asheville, NC; Atlanta, GA; Baton Rouge, LA; Columbia, SC; Fort Lauderdale, FL; Fort Myers, FL; Greenville/Spartanburg, SC; Huntsville, AL; Knoxville, TN; Lafayette, LA; Las Vegas, NV; Little Rock, AR; Louisville, KY; Sanford/Orlando, FL; Savannah, GA; Shreveport, LA; St. Louis, MO; and St. Petersburg, FL. Vision flew Boeing 737 jetliners and Dornier 328 turboprops. Vision later ended all flights at the airport and shut down its VPS hub.

Northwest Florida Regional Airport changed its name to Destin–Fort Walton Beach Airport on a 3–2 vote on February 17, 2015.

In March 2016, GLO Airlines began less than daily, seasonal service from VPS to Little Rock (LIT) and New Orleans (MSY) using 30-seat Saab 340B turboprop aircraft. GLO has since ceased all flights and is no longer in business.

A couple months later, Allegiant Air began scheduled service to VPS from Cincinnati (CVG), Ft Lauderdale (FLL), Oklahoma City (OKC), Knoxville (TYS), Memphis (MEM) and St Louis/Belleville (BLV) flying Airbus A319, A320, and McDonnell Douglas MD-80 mainline jet aircraft. The Destin–Fort Walton Beach Airport became a focus city for the airline at this time.

In September 2016, Contour Airlines began flying less than daily, seasonal service from Bowling Green, KY (BWG) to VPS using 30-seat British Aerospace BAe Jetstream 41 turboprop aircraft. These flights ended in 2018 due to low demand.

Allegiant Air announced a major expansion at VPS in January 2017 with a new base of operations to be located on the airport with a total of eighteen (18) domestic destinations to be served nonstop on seasonal basis with mainline jet aircraft by June 2017 with most of the planned new service to begin in May 2017.

Silver Airways began daily service to Orlando, FL (MCO) from VPS in May 2019 using a 34-seat Saab 340 turboprop aircraft. Silver stopped serving VPS in 2020 due to the Covid-19 pandemic.

Southwest Airlines began service to VPS with flights to Dallas-Love (DAL), Nashville (BNA), Baltimore/Washington (BWI) and Chicago/Midway (MDW) in May 2021.

United Airlines announced in March 2022 that they would cease all flights into VPS, citing long-term unsustainability. Later that year, Concourse C expansion opens for exclusive use by Allegiant Air, flying to 35 destinations.

In February 2024, Avelo Airlines announces service to Tweed-New Haven Airport (HVN) in Connecticut, starting on May 17, 2024. Avelo ceased serving the airport in 2026.

JetBlue announced in November 2025 that they would serve the airport seasonally starting on March 5, 2026, flying to Boston and New York-JFK.

== Facilities ==
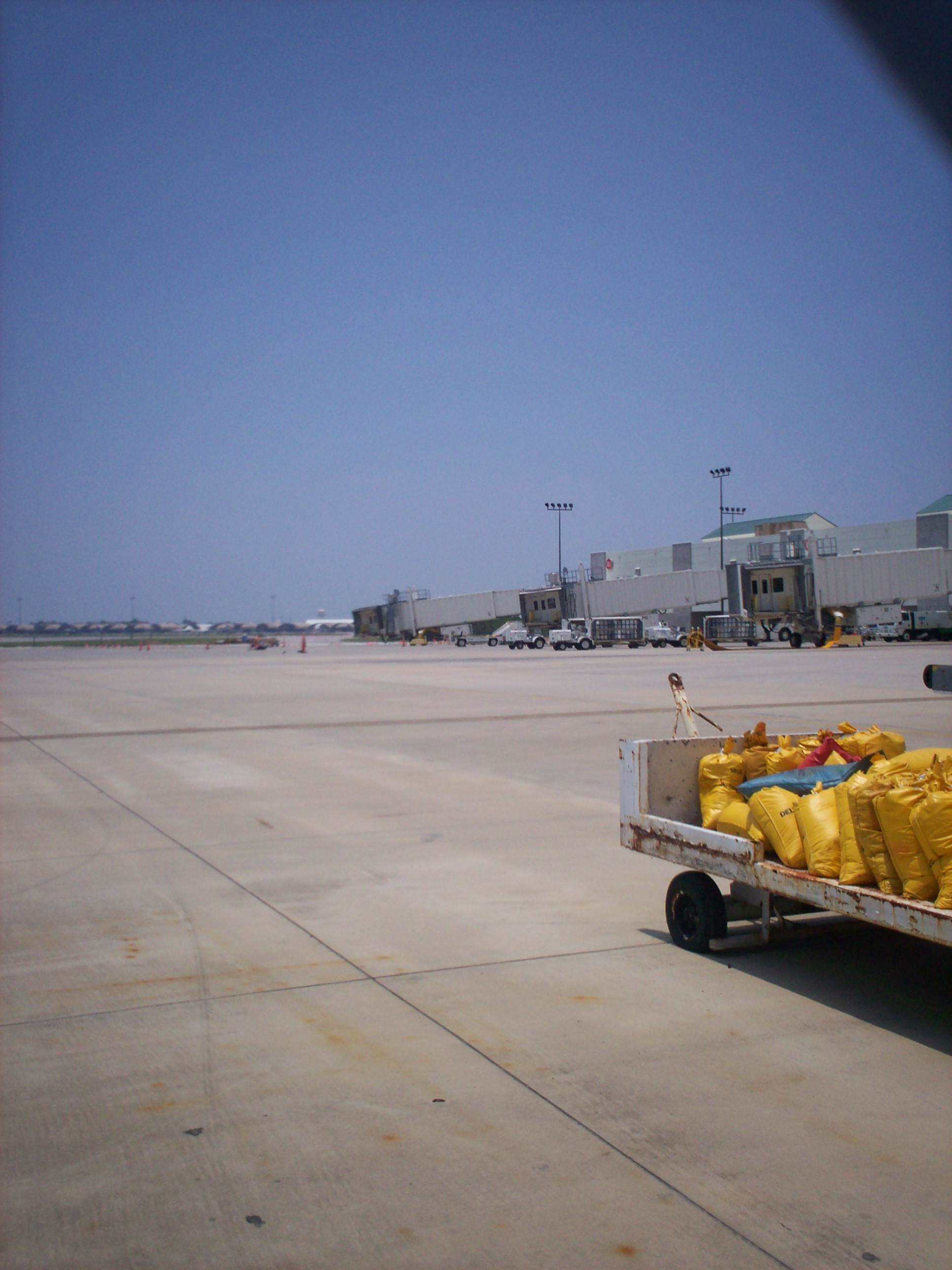
Gates at VPS

Destin–Fort Walton Beach Airport and Eglin AFB covers 6,500 acres (2,630 ha) and share two runways: 12/30 is 12,004 ft × 300 ft (3,659 m × 91 m) asphalt/concrete and 02/20 is 10,012 ft × 300 ft (3,052 m × 91 m) asphalt.

=== Terminal ===
The airport has a 116,000 sq ft (10,800 m^{2}) passenger terminal with five second-level gates with passenger jet ways and three ground-level commuter gates with passenger jet ways.

The two-level terminal opened in November 2004. The old terminal building was demolished soon after. The terminal has areas for ticketing and baggage claim and upper and lower courses with gates. The first level has Gates A1, A2, and A3 and waiting areas and a concession area. The second-level concourse has Gates B1, B2, B3, B4, B5 and B6. B3 is rarely used due to a lack of flights during the slow season. B5 is rarely used due to a lack of a jetway. Passengers have to descend a narrow stairwell which is not very conducive to safe and speedy boarding of the aircraft. The second-level concourse also has a restaurant and concession areas. The terminal was designed to allow future expansion. Concourse C, completed in 2022 for Allegiant Air's exclusive use, is located to the west of the main terminal. The $11.4 million-dollar, 26,000 square foot expansion includes 5 new ground-level gates, along with multiple food and beverage options. However, passengers will still have to check in, as well as collect baggage, at the main terminal.

=== Ground transportation ===
Access to the terminal is off of State Road 85. Parking facilities are to the left, the terminal or loop is straight ahead and rental car return is to the right. The airport loop road has two pass-through lanes on the left and three arrival-departure lanes in front of the terminal. The loop road is a two-lane asphalt roadway about ¾ mile long. Short-term and long-term parking facilities are available. The parking facilities were improved in the early 2000s (decade) as part of the new terminal expansion. These were designed with the Transportation Security Administration's "300-foot rule" in mind, and satisfy the 300-foot (91 m) distance between parked vehicles and the terminal building.

== Airlines and destinations ==
Airlines	Destinations	Refs
Allegiant Air	Belleville/St. Louis, Cincinnati, Columbia (MO), Denver, Fayetteville/Bentonville, Flint, Las Vegas, Minneapolis/St. Paul (resumes April 14, 2027), Newark, Philadelphia (begins May 21, 2027), Washington–Dulles; Seasonal: Akron/Canton, Boston, Chicago–Midway, Columbus–Rickenbacker, Des Moines, Grand Rapids, Indianapolis, Kansas City, Knoxville, Little Rock, Louisville, Oklahoma City, Peoria, Pittsburgh, Tulsa, Wichita	
American Airlines	Charlotte, Dallas/Fort Worth; Seasonal: Chicago–O'Hare, Washington–National	
American Eagle	Charlotte, Chicago–O'Hare, Miami, Washington–National; Seasonal: Dallas/Fort Worth, Philadelphia	
Delta Air Lines	Atlanta, Minneapolis/St. Paul	
Delta Connection	Seasonal: New York–LaGuardia	
JetBlue	Seasonal: Boston, New York–JFK	
Southwest Airlines	Dallas–Love, Houston–Hobby, Nashville; Seasonal: Baltimore, Chicago–Midway, Indianapolis (begins March 11, 2027), Kansas City, Pittsburgh, St. Louis	
Sun Country Airlines	Seasonal: Minneapolis/St. Paul (ends April 13, 2027)	

== Statistics ==
=== Top destinations ===
Busiest domestic routes (September 2025 – August 2026)
Rank	City	Passengers	Carriers
1	Atlanta, GA	254,120	Delta
2	Dallas/Fort Worth, TX	144,520	American
3	Charlotte, NC	108,860	American
4	Nashville, TN	86,400	Allegiant, Southwest
5	Minneapolis/St Paul, MN	71,290	Allegiant, Delta, Sun Country
6	Cincinnati, OH	59,330	Allegiant
7	Dallas–Love, TX	57,300	Southwest
8	St. Louis–Belleville, IL	53,590	Allegiant
9	Baltimore, MD	28,170	Allegiant, Southwest
10	Fayetteville/Bentonville, AR	28,160	Allegiant

=== Airline market share ===
Largest Airlines at VPS (September 2025 – August 2026)
Rank	Carrier	Passengers	Market Share
1	Allegiant	726,000	28.94%
2	Delta	584,000	23.28%
3	American	466,000	18.57%
4	Southwest	443,000	17.68%
5	Envoy Air	80,930	3.23%
	Others	208,000	8.31%

=== Annual traffic ===
VPS Airport Annual Traffic 2017–Present
Year	Passengers	% Change
2017	1,175,894	—
2018	1,413,843	▲20.24%
2019	1,673,226	▲18.35%
2020	948,292	▼43.33%
2021	1,998,587	▲110.76%
2022	2,006,297	▲0.39%
2023	2,279,847	▲13.63%
2024	2,377,831	▲4.30%
2025	2,491,886	▲4.80%

== Accidents and incidents ==
- On November 13, 1969, a USAF North American Sabreliner on final approach crashed into the water of Apalachicola Bay in foggy weather 4 km from Valparaiso-Eglin AFB (VPS). The aircraft was fitted with radiological test equipment for Project "Have Doughnut". Both occupants survived, but the aircraft was destroyed and written off.
- On January 1, 1994, a Piper PA-46 Malibu crashed while on approach to the Destin-Fort Walton Beach Airport. It was found that the pilot failed to maintain adequate airspeed, leading to an inadvertent stall with inadequate altitude for recovery. Both occupants were killed.
- On March 2, 2003, a Mooney M20M experienced an in-flight fire shortly after takeoff from the Destin-Ft Walton Beach Airport. The pilot successfully returned to the airport despite thick black smoke in the cockpit. The probable cause of the mishap was found to be an inadequate annual/100-hour inspection of the engine by the mechanic for his failure to properly secure the tailpipe assembly to the turbocharger resulting in separation of the tailpipe and subsequent in-flight fire.
- On October 3, 2005, a Piper PA-46 Malibu Mirage veered off the runway during the landing roll at the Destin-Fort Walton Beach Airport. The probable cause of the accident was found to be the inadequate design of the engine mount which led to cracking of the mount resulting in a loss of directional control and collapse of the nose landing gear. A contributing factor was the failure of maintenance personnel to comply with a service bulletin to inspect the engine mount for cracks.

== See also ==
- List of airports in Florida
