= Elizabeth Corbett =

Elizabeth Corbett may refer to:

- Elizabeth Burgoyne Corbett (1846–1930), also known as Mrs George Corbett, British feminist and author
- Elizabeth Frances Corbett (1887–1981), American novelist
- Elizabeth Terhune Corbett (1830–1899), American poet and writer of children's books

== See also ==
- Liz Corbett, British epidemiologist
- Elizabeth Yeats (Elizabeth Corbet Yeats), educator and publisher
