= Mary Bassett =

Mary Bassett may refer to:

- Mary T. Bassett (born 1952), American health commissioner and professor of clinical epidemiology
- Mary R. Bassett, illustrator of magazines and children's books
- Mary Bassett Clarke (1831–1908), née Bassett, American writer.

== See also ==
- Mary Basset (c. 1523–1572), translator of works into the English language
- Mary Imogene Bassett Hospital
