= Carmen L. Browne =

American author and illustrator

- Born: March 29, 1895; Calumet, Michigan, U.S.
- Died: April 11, 1992 (aged 97); Chapel Hill, North Carolina, U.S.
- Education: School of the Art Institute of Chicago; Art Students League of New York
- Occupations: Author; illustrator

Carmen L. Browne (March 29, 1895 – April 11, 1992) was an early twentieth century author and illustrator, particularly of children's books.

== Early life and education ==
Browne was born on March 29, 1895, in Calumet, Michigan. She attended the School of the Art Institute of Chicago and the Art Students League of New York.

== Career ==
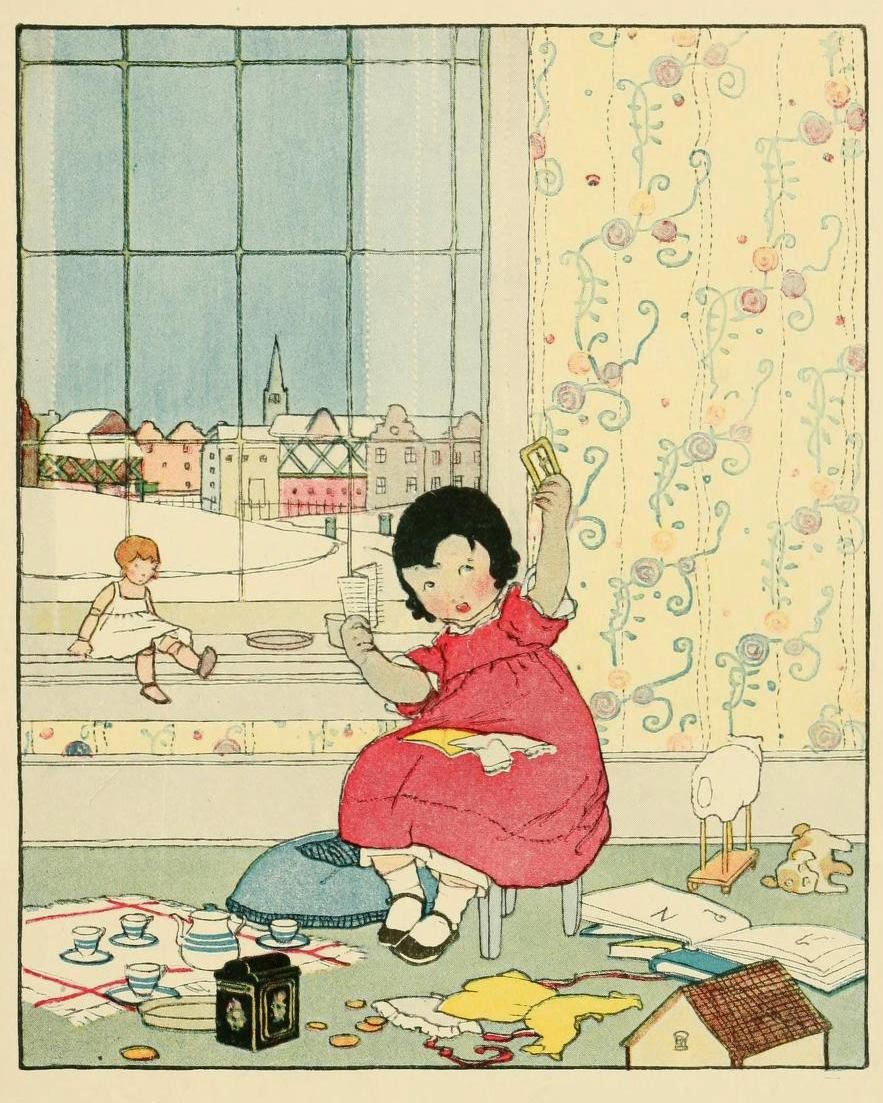
Illustration from Sunny Rhymes for Happy Children, 1917

Browne created illustrations for books and greeting cards for the P. F. Volland Company. Her illustrations were described as "light and dainty", "difficult to surpass in sheer loveliness", "apt pictures .. to please the wee ones", "assisting the text admirably, designed as they are to delight the child's heart," and as making "appropriate" gift books for "little friends and relatives. She also designed wallpaper patterns for children, and invented an educational doll apparatus, "to associate with a doll educational matter which is commonly presented in unattractive, formal lessons." Her lithographs, some of which were shown at the Ninth International Print Makers' Exhibition in 1928, were described as "amusing and very expert".

A 1927 New York Times review of a group show at the National Art Club described a Browne image of a girl pulling weeds as being "as true to nature as Millet tried to make his peasant girls," and a Browne nude as, "a fine abstraction" that "removes all superfluous details and gives a chance for beautiful rhythm of movement."

== Personal life ==
Browne married Jesse Augustus Luckner (1891-1975) in 1945.

== Death ==
Browne died on April 11, 1992, in Chapel Hill, North Carolina.

== Selected works ==
- Miller, Olive Beaupré, and Carmen L. Brown. Sunny Rhymes for Happy Children. New York: P. F. Volland Co, 1917. OCLC 223256583
- Miller, Olive Beaupré, and Carmen L. Brown. Come Play with Me. Joliet, Illinois: P. F. Volland Company, 1918. OCLC 672046534
- Haynes, Louise Marshall, and Carmen Browne. Over the Rainbow Bridge. Chicago: P. F. Volland Company, 1920. OCLC 12110203
- Browne, Carmen. My Book of Pets. Chicago: Volland Company, 1923. OCLC 63451302
- Browne, Carmen. A Day of Play. Joliet, Illinois: Published by P.F. Volland Company, 1923. OCLC 1012486932
- Kilner, Colleen Browne, and Carmen L. Browne. La-La Man In Music-Land. Boston: Lothrop, Lee & Shepard, 1927. OCLC 18829667
- Luckner, Carmen Browne, Matthew Ware and Ronald H. Bayes. A gift of light. Laurinburg, N.C.: St. Andrews Press, 1993. OCLC 28522431
