= James E. Plew =

Chicago businessman

James E. Plew (July 3, 1862 – April 16, 1938) was a Chicago businessman whose early interest in the development of aviation eventually led him to acquire the initial leasehold in 1934 on the Valparaiso, Florida property that would evolve into Eglin Air Force Base.

== Early years ==
James E. Plew was born on July 3, 1862, in Brown County, Illinois. "He began his business career by starting a small linen supply service to a few buildings in Chicago. This business grew into the Chicago Towel Company, one of the largest of its kind in the world. He relinquished management of this business several years ago, but retained a large investment in it."

Plew became the agent in Chicago for the White Motor Car Company, and in 1909, opened a dealership to sell Curtiss airplanes as well. By 1910, he operated a Curtiss machine out of a small flying field at 65th Street and Major Avenue in the Clearing Industrial District just south of where Midway Airport now stands. As an officer of the Aero Club of Illinois, founded February 10, 1910, he succeeded Octave Chanute when the first president of the club died November 23, 1910. He held this post until succeeded by Harold F. McCormick in 1912.

The first victim of a fatal airplane crash in the Chicago area was piloting a Curtiss biplane owned by Plew. While trying to qualify for his pilot's license on July 13, 1911, Dan Kreamer put the plane into a sharp turn at one hundred feet and spun into the ground at 7:18 p.m. He was rushed to St. Anthony de Padua Hospital, where he died about an hour and a half later, leaving a widow and two children. The accident received front page coverage in all the Chicago newspapers the next day.

In 1914, McCormick, Plew, and Bion J. Arnold attempted to form a commuter airline which they announced would begin service in May, "using seaplanes to ferry passengers between various North Shore suburbs and Grant Park and the South Shore Country Club. Lake Shore Airline, which had two seaplanes, was intended to be a profit-making venture charging a steep twenty-eight-dollar round-trip fare between Lake Forest and downtown Chicago on four daily scheduled circuits. However, Chicago's irregular weather, especially the crosswinds, made a shamble of schedules, and the airline disappeared before the end of the year."

Plew briefly employed the Loughead half brothers, Victor and Allan, to work on two of his aircraft during which time both joined the Aero Club. When Plew withdrew from the aircraft sales business following the crash of one of his planes, both stayed in aviation, with Allan moving to California to co-found what would become Lockheed Aircraft Company with his other brother, Malcolm.

== Later years ==
In 1922, Plew relocated to the Panhandle of Northwest Florida where he became "one of Northwest Florida's pioneer developers." He settled on the sleepy fishing town of Valparaiso, Florida "as the most likely spot for development. He founded the Bank of Valparaiso, constructed the Valparaiso Inn [in 1924], organized the Chicago Country Club which constructed the Valparaiso Country Club golf course and was instrumental in many other development activities in the community.

"He was the donor of the Plew Trophy, for which golfers of the southeast compete annually and the fifteenth annual tournament for the cup, which was to be held this weekend, was postponed following the announcement of Mr. Plew's death."

"Other interests of Mr. Plew included the founding of the Shalimar Winery, which was established to use the surplus grape crop of the county. He also founded the Valparaiso Novelty Company, helped to establish a knitting mill in the community [the Valpariso Hosiery Mill was destroyed by fire on August 13, 1939] and was interested in a number of other enterprises to which he made investments to help their development."

"...[T]hrough the continued development of that particular area by both Mr. and Mrs. Plew, the whole area boomed into a vacating spot for many Northerners, mostly from Chicago, lured to Okaloosa county [sic] by the Plews."

The headline in the Playground News announcing Nettie Plew's death in 1951, described her as the "Widow of [the] Valparaiso Founder."

== Military development ==
Plew thought that a military payroll would boost the depression-stricken economy of the region. He leased from the City of Valparaiso the Valparaiso Airport, an arrowhead-shaped parcel of 137 acres (0.55 km^{2}) cleared in 1933 as an airdrome. In 1934, Plew offered the U.S. government 1,460 acres (6 km^{2}) contiguous land for a bombing and gunnery base. This leasehold became the headquarters for the Valparaiso Bombing and Gunnery Base activated on June 14, 1935, under the command of Captain Arnold H. Rich. This was the founding of Eglin Air Force Base.

== Death ==
Plew died on April 16, 1938, four days after suffering a heart attack. His wife and two daughters survived him.

"In keeping with the life he lived, the simple funeral rites were held on the lawn of his home. Rev. F. H. Fox, pastor of the Valparaiso Community church [sic], conducted the services which were in charge of Fisher-Pou of Pensacola. The remains were sent to Jacksonville for cremation." His ashes were dropped from a plane and spread across the Choctawhatchee Bay.

== Commemoration ==
A plaque was mounted on one of the stone plinths at the East Gate of Eglin Field, commemorating Plew's part in the founding of the installation. The inscription of the plaque, unveiled on Decoration Day 1939, read: "In memory of James E. Plew, 1862-1938, whose patriotism and generosity made this field possible." This has disappeared over time, as have the stone gates, with further growth of the base, which the Okaloosa News-Journal correctly predicted "will be greatly expanded in the near future" in the front page story about Plew's death.

A Defense Housing Project at Eglin Field for civilian and military personnel, erected between May and October 1941 by the Paul A. Miller Construction Company of Leesburg, Florida, at a cost of approximately $800,000, was named Plew Heights in honor of the developer. The obsolete complex was razed in recent years.

The newly constructed James E. Plew Terminal Building of the Okaloosa Air Terminal, located on State Road 85, opened its doors in mid-February 1975, with a dedication ceremony held on Saturday, February 22. Congressman Bob Sikes and Southern Airways President Frank Hulse were some of the guest speakers.

== See also ==
- History of Eglin Air Force Base
