= Heritage Museum of Northwest Florida =

Coordinates: 30°30′17″N 86°29′24″W

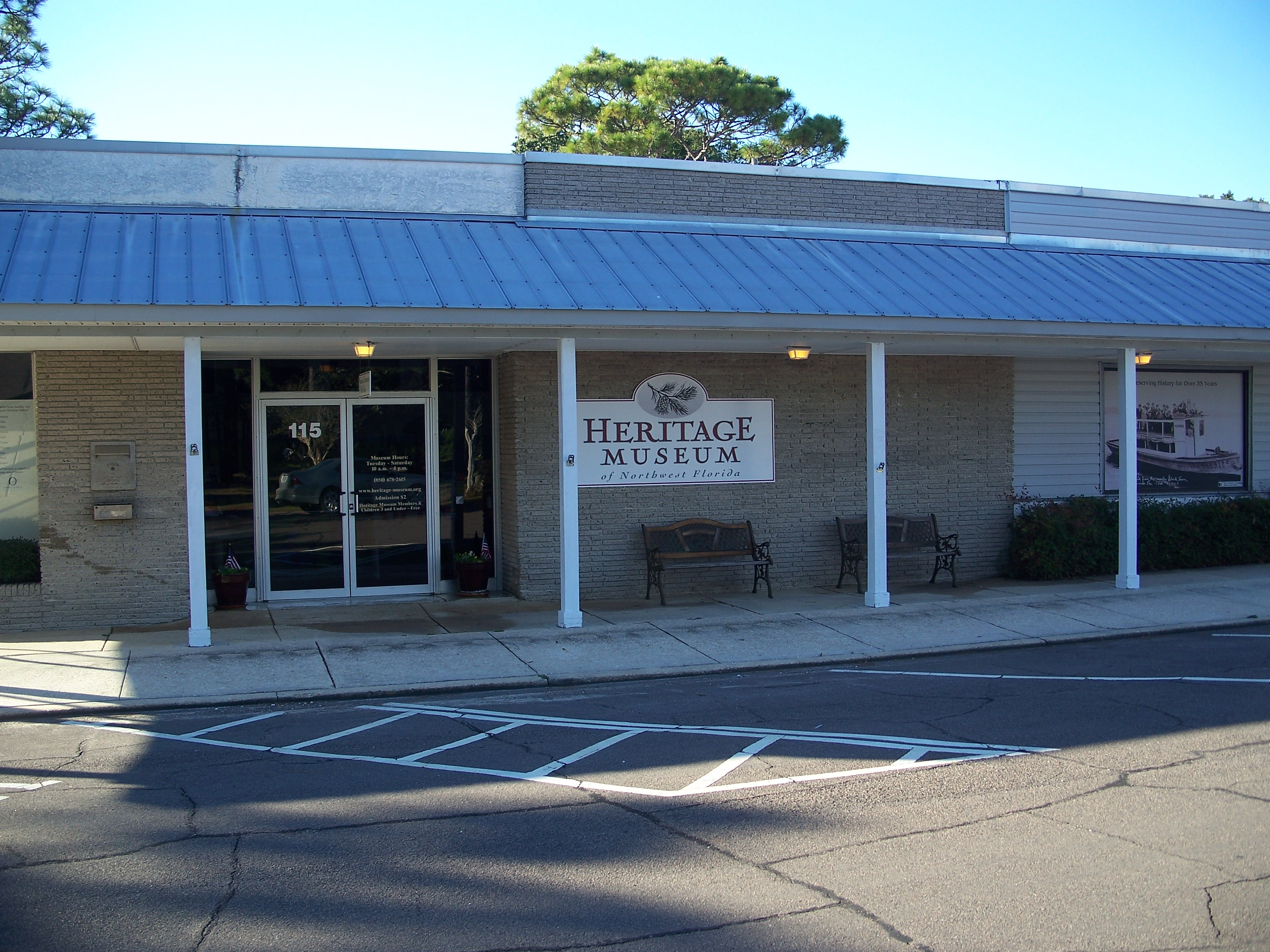

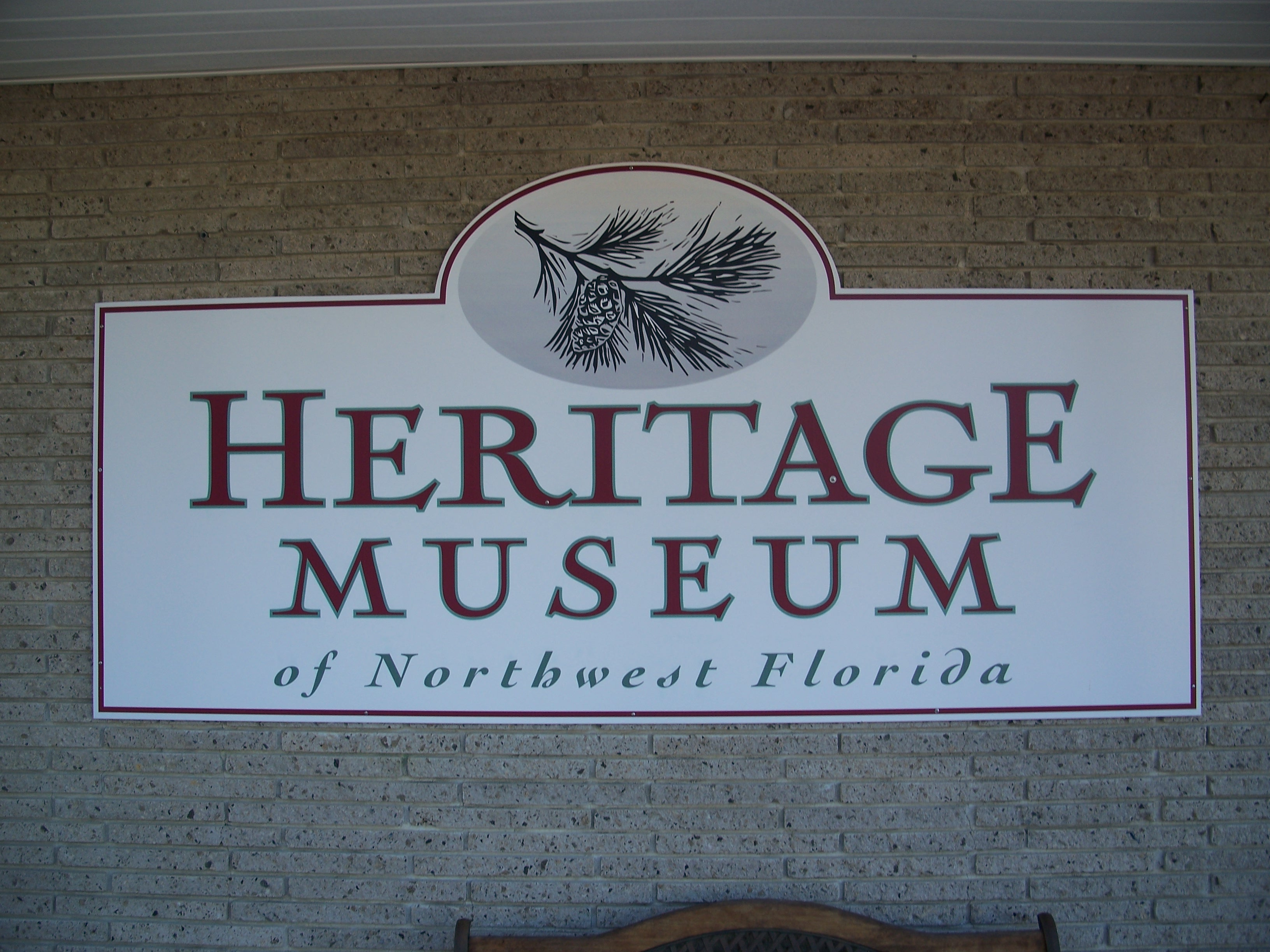

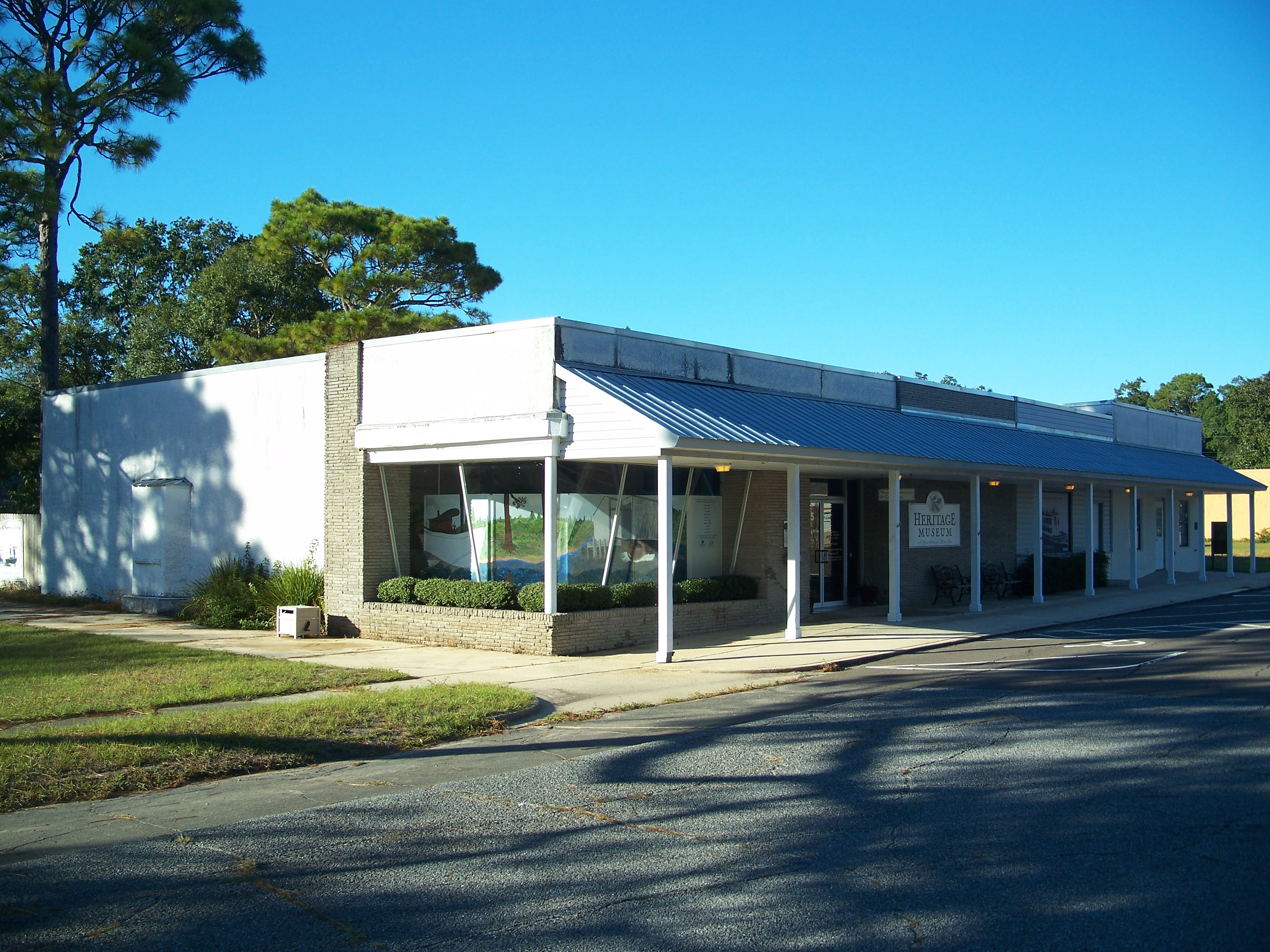

Heritage Museum of Northwest Florida was founded in 1971 in Valparaiso, Florida, Okaloosa County, Florida. The museum's permanent collection includes flint spear points, stone tools from Paleo-Archaic hunters, pottery shards from the Woodland Period, a black iron wash pot, crosscut saws, turpentine collection cups, a porcelain pitcher, lumber mill tokens, and old school desks. The museum's collection also covers the area's fishing history, includes a heritage mural, and hosts the Crestview Train Depot.

The museum offers their Heritage Alive monthly classes on how to make like the local pioneers use to do in order to teach history in a hands-on manner. These classes include the following:

| Class | Instructor |
|---|---|
| Pine Needle Basketry | Joe Stoy |
| Seat Weaving | Phil Richter |
| Basket Weaving | Janet Faubel |
| Loom Weaving | Sandy Sutton |
| Mosaics | Kathleen Nehus |
| Soap Making | Walter Roof |
