= Charlotte B. Herr =

American writer

Charlotte B. Herr was an author of children's books in the early 20th century, especially the Punky Dunk Series. Many of her early works were illustrated by Frances Beem and published by P. F. Volland Company.

== Selected works ==
- Punky Dunk and the Gold Fish. Chicago: 1912.
- Punky Dunk and the Mouse. Chicago: P. F. Volland Company, 1912.
- Punky Dunk and the Spotted Pup. Chicago: P. F. Volland Company, 1912.
- How Freckle Frog Made Herself Pretty. Designs by Frances Beem. Chicago: P. F. Volland Company, 1913.
- How Punky Dunk Helped Old Prince. Designs by Frances Beem. Chicago: P. F. Volland Company, 1913.
- The Unselfish Pig. Designs by Frances Beem. Chicago: P. F. Volland Company, 1913.
- The Bear Who Was Never Cross. Designs by Frances Beem. Chicago: P. F. Volland Company, 1913.
- San Pasqual, a Tale of Old Pasadena. Pasadena: 1924.
