= Eleanore Barté =

American author and illustrator (1893–1946)

- Born: June 11, 1893; Milwaukee
- Died: November 15, 1946 (aged 53)
- Writing career
- Genre: Children's

Eleanore Amelie Barté (June 11, 1893 – November 15, 1946) was an American writer and illustrator of children's books.

She was born in Milwaukee to Frank Barte, a machinist born in Wisconsin to German immigrants, and Anna H. Stakl or Steckl, born in Germany.

== Selected works ==
- Adventures in Girlhood. Philadelphia: The Penn Publishing Company, 1917.
- The Tin Soldier. Philadelphia: The Penn Publishing Company, 1919. Reprinted by Grosset & Dunlap in 1921 and in 1926 by The Penn Publishing Company.
- The Trumpeter Swan. Illustrated by Alice Barker Stephens. Philadelphia: The Penn Publishing Company, 1920. Reprinted.
- The Gay Cockade. Philadelphia: The Penn Publishing Company, 1921.
- The Dim Lantern. Illustrated by Coles Phillips. Philadelphia: The Penn Publishing Company, 1922.
- Amend, Ottilie, and Barté, Eleanore. Jolly Jungle Jingles. P. F. Volland Company, 1929.
- Barté, Eleanore. John Hoe; Or, 'A Penny Saved' . New York: Frederick A. Stokes Co, 1938. OCLC 5868452
- Patrice, Margaret and Barté, Eleanore. Up the Shining Path. Milwaukee: Bruce Pub. Co, 1946. OCLC 8459849
