= Elizabeth O. Hiller =

Cookbook author

- Born: circa 1856
- Died: August 14, 1941 (aged 84–85); Park Ridge, Illinois
- Occupation(s): chef, cookbook writer
- Years active: 1898–1936
- Notable work: The Corn Cook Book

Elizabeth O. Hiller (circa 1856 – August 14, 1941) was a prominent early twentieth-century American author of cookbooks and a professor of culinary arts.

== Career ==
Hiller attended the Pratt Institute, Brooklyn, and the Boston Cooking School, graduating in its class of 1898. She was later the principal of the Chicago Domestic Training School, which was located at 53 Dearborn Street in Chicago.

In 1905, The Women's Home Companion invited six leading cooking personalities to submit columns with their favorite recipes in a contest to select a new regular columnist. Hiller participated and lost to Fannie Farmer.

She contributed a regular column to the magazine Chef, Steward and Housekeeper, and wrote recipes for the Chicago Tribune which were also published in other newspapers across the United States. She regularly lectured on culinary topics, at shows and expositions, to clubs and societies around the country, and on radio. Her recipe or menu calendars were still being published in the early 1930s.

Hiller participated in advertising for various products, including gas ranges and fruited cereal.

== Personal life ==
Hiller was married to Jackson Hiller. She died on 14 August 1941, aged 85, at the home of a daughter in Park Ridge, Illinois.

== Selected works ==
- Hiller, Elizabeth O. The Calendar of Cakes, Fillings and Frostings: Recipes of 365 Different Cakes and Cookies, As Well As Frostings and Fillings. Joliet, Ill: P. F. Volland Company. OCLC 6134998
- Hiller, Elizabeth O. Fifty-Two Sunday Dinners". Chicago: N. K. Fairbank Company, 1915.
- Hiller, Elizabeth O. The Calendar of Luncheons, with 52 Practical Sunday Evening Suppers. 365 Answers to the Daily Question: "What Shall We Have for Luncheon?". Chicago: P. F. Volland & Co, 1916. OCLC 38724263
- Hiller, Elizabeth O. The Calendar of Salads; 365 Answers to the Daily Question: "What Shall We Have for Salad?". New York: P. F. Volland Co, 1916. OCLC 2314741
- Hiller, Elizabeth O. The Calendar of Desserts: 365 Answers to the Daily Question : "What Shall We Have for Dessert.". New York: P. F. Volland & Co, 1916. . OCLC 679360020
- Hiller, Elizabeth O. The Corn Cook Book. Chicago: P. F. Volland Company, 1918. War edition. OCLC 441937808
- Hiller, Elizabeth O. Left-Over Foods and How to Use Them, With Suggestions Regarding the Preservation of Foods in the Home. 1910. OCLC 13343068
- Hiller, Elizabeth O. New Dinners for All Occasions: With Instructions for Formal and Informal Dinner Service. Joliet, Ill: P. F. Volland, 1920. OCLC 6130210
- Hiller, Elizabeth O. The New Calendar of Salads; 365 Answers to the Daily Question: "What Shall We Have for Salad?". Joliet: P. F. Volland Co, 192?. OCLC 767922944.
- Hiller, Elizabeth O. Your Daily Kitchen Companion. Learn a Little, Save a Little Every Day. Chicago: P.F. Volland Company, 1918. OCLC 38724435
