= Frances Beem =

American writer

Frances May Beem (5 May 1881 – 10 November 1971) was an early 20th-century American author and illustrator of children's books.

== Early life and education ==
Frances M. Beem was born in Illinois on May 5, 1881. Her father was born in Indiana and her mother in either Indiana or Wisconsin. She had one brother, Jacob Darrel Beem, a retail shoe salesman.

== Life and career ==
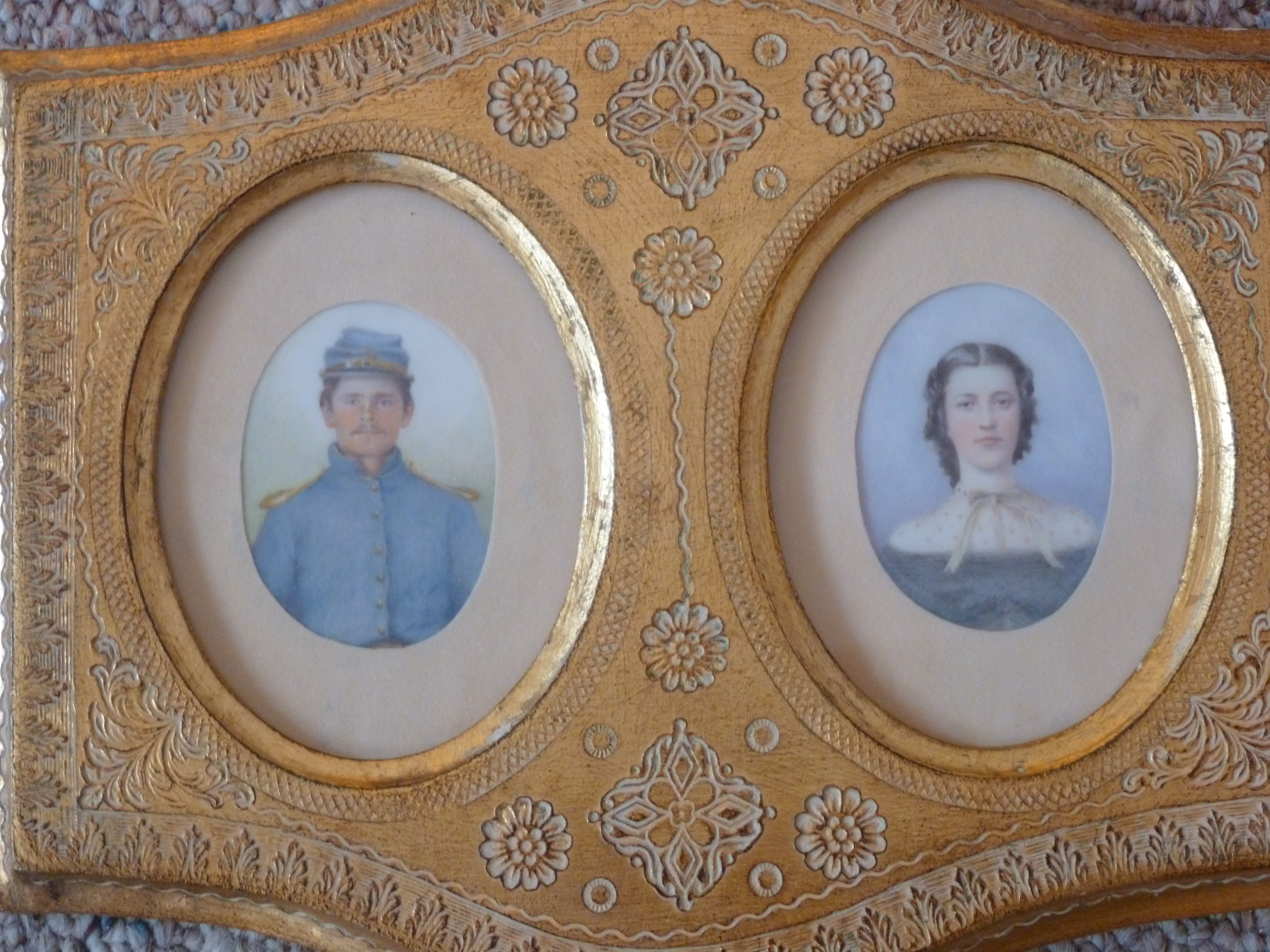
Frances Beem miniature portraits of Oliver Eames & Alice Drake Eames

Her training in art is unknown but she did exhibit three watercolor illustrations at The Twentieth Annual Exhibition of the Arts Students’ League December 12–29, 1912 in Chicago. Frances Beem is listed in the catalogue of the Seventh Annual Exhibition by the Chicago Society of Miniature Painters that was held at the Art Institute of Chicago, February 13- March 30, 1919. Her address is recorded as 4310 Sheridan Rd, Chicago. Her three displayed works were:

Alice Drake Eames- lent by Mrs. Jean Eames Bliss

Captain O.E. Eames- lent by Mrs. Jean Eames Bliss

Melville C. Eames

She published a textbook with another person about teaching technical perspective drawing to beginning high school students.

She taught high school art and drawing from 1917 to 1946 at Nicholas Senn High School, a public 4–year high school located in the Edgewater neighborhood on the North Side of Chicago, Illinois.

When Frances Beem retired from teaching, she moved to La Jolla, California where she lived for several years. She died in San Diego, California, on November 10, 1971 at the age of 90.

== Selected works ==
=== As author ===
- The Human Head New York, Milwaukee: Bruce, 1931.
- Pen and Pencil Drawings: Examples of Fine Technique. Peoria, Illinois: The Manual Arts Press, 1938.

=== As illustrator ===
- Herr, Charlotte. How Freckle Frog Made Herself Pretty. Chicago: P. F. Volland Company, 1913.
- Herr, Charlotte. How Punky Dunk Helped Old Prince. Chicago: P. F. Volland Company, 1913.
- Herr, Charlotte. The Unselfish Pig. Chicago: P. F. Volland Company, 1913.
- Herr, Charlotte. The Bear Who Was Never Cross. Chicago: P. F. Volland Company, 1913.
- Fox, Frances Margaret. Little Bear's Ups and Downs. Chicago: Rand McNally, 1925.
- Three Little Pigs and the Foolish Pig. Chicago: Rand McNally, 1918.
- Fry, Elizabeth Stafford. Bully Bull Frog and His Home in Rainbow Valley. Chicago: Rand McNally, 1921.
