= Valparaiso Inn =

- Formerly listed on the U.S. National Register of Historic Places
- Location: 331 Bayshore Drive, Valparaiso, Florida
- Area: 4.3 acres (1.7 ha)
- Built: 1924
- Architect: Walker D. Willis
- Architectural style: Late 19th And 20th Century Revival
- NRHP reference No.: 78000954

Significant dates
- Added to NRHP: August 1, 1978
- Removed from NRHP: 1981

The Valparaiso Inn was built in 1924 on the shores of Boggy Bayou in Valparaiso, Florida, by developer James E. Plew. The three-story Spanish stucco structure was patterned after Chicago's famous Edgewater Beach Hotel. It had four wings angled to catch the breeze and provide a panoramic view of Boggy Bayou and Choctawhatchee Bay. It offered 56 guests rooms.

== History ==
Advertisements in the local paper in 1939 stated "We Take this Opportunity to Remind You of the Excellent Facilities for Recreation Offered By Valparaiso Inn and Golf Course." The Inn was listed as being "Open All Year", and boasting "Fire Protection .. Sprinkler System", 60 modern rooms, swimming beach, and two tennis courts.

The nearby Valparaiso Country Club claimed "Beautiful Grass, Greens and Tees," 6350 Yards, 5 Water Holes, with fees of $1.00 per day.

In June 1941, the Officers Club of Eglin Field made arrangements to take over the Valparaiso Inn, Valparaiso, Florida, as the "O Club".

Lt. Col. Jimmy Doolittle and many of the "Tokyo Raiders" were housed at the Inn while they trained at Eglin Field in March 1942.

The Inn was sold by the Plew family in 1950. It continued to operate as a hotel until 1957, when it was converted into an apartment complex.

On March 2, 1977, a fire severely damaged the Inn and it remained vacant until fire completely destroyed it on October 25, 1980.
