= Ve Elizabeth Cadie =

American illustrator of children's books

Ve Elizabeth Cadie (1893 – August 2, 1956) was an early twentieth century American illustrator of children's books and magazines, a stylist, and a designer.

== Career ==
She worked as an illustrator for the P. F. Volland Company and Rand McNally & Company, and as a designer for W. S. George Pottery Company, where she was responsible for the "Calico" design. Her images appeared on the cover of magazines like Child Life in the 1930s. In articles about design for the home, she was described as a "prominent designer", "whose originality is causing quite a stir in art and industry".

Cadie obtained a patent for her invention of a heat insulating handle for small home appliances and for a coffee pot design, in 1945 and 1951 respectively.

She died on August 2, 1956.

== Selected works ==
- Merryman, Mildred Plew, and Ve Elizabeth Cadie. Bonbon and Bonbonette. Chicago: Rand McNally & Co., 1924. OCLC 1057432653
- Muter, Gladys Nelson, and Ve Elizabeth Cadie. Two Wooden Soldiers and a Hobby Horse. Joliet, Illinois: P. F. Volland Co, 1924. OCLC 173512178
- Campbell, Ruth, and Ve Elizabeth Cadie. The Cat Whose Whiskers Slipped: And Other Stories. Joliet, Illinois: P. F. Volland Co, 1925. Republished by Wise-Parlow Company in 1938. OCLC 5957166
- Campbell, Ruth, and Ve Elizabeth Cadie. The Turtle Whose Snap Unfastened. Joliet: P.F. Volland, 1927. OCLC 14103176
- Hankins, Maude McGehee, and Ve Elizabeth Cadie. Daddy Gander. Joliet: P.F. Volland Co., 1928. OCLC 15805865
- Warde, Margaret, and Ve Elizabeth Cadie. Biddy and Buddy's Holidays. New York: D. Appleton, 1930. OCLC 22981028
- Cadie, Ve Elizabeth. The ABC Circus. 1932. OCLC 179257593
- Cadie, Ve Elizabeth, Mister Wubble's Bubbles. 1936. Saafield Publishing Company.
