= Mary R. Bassett =

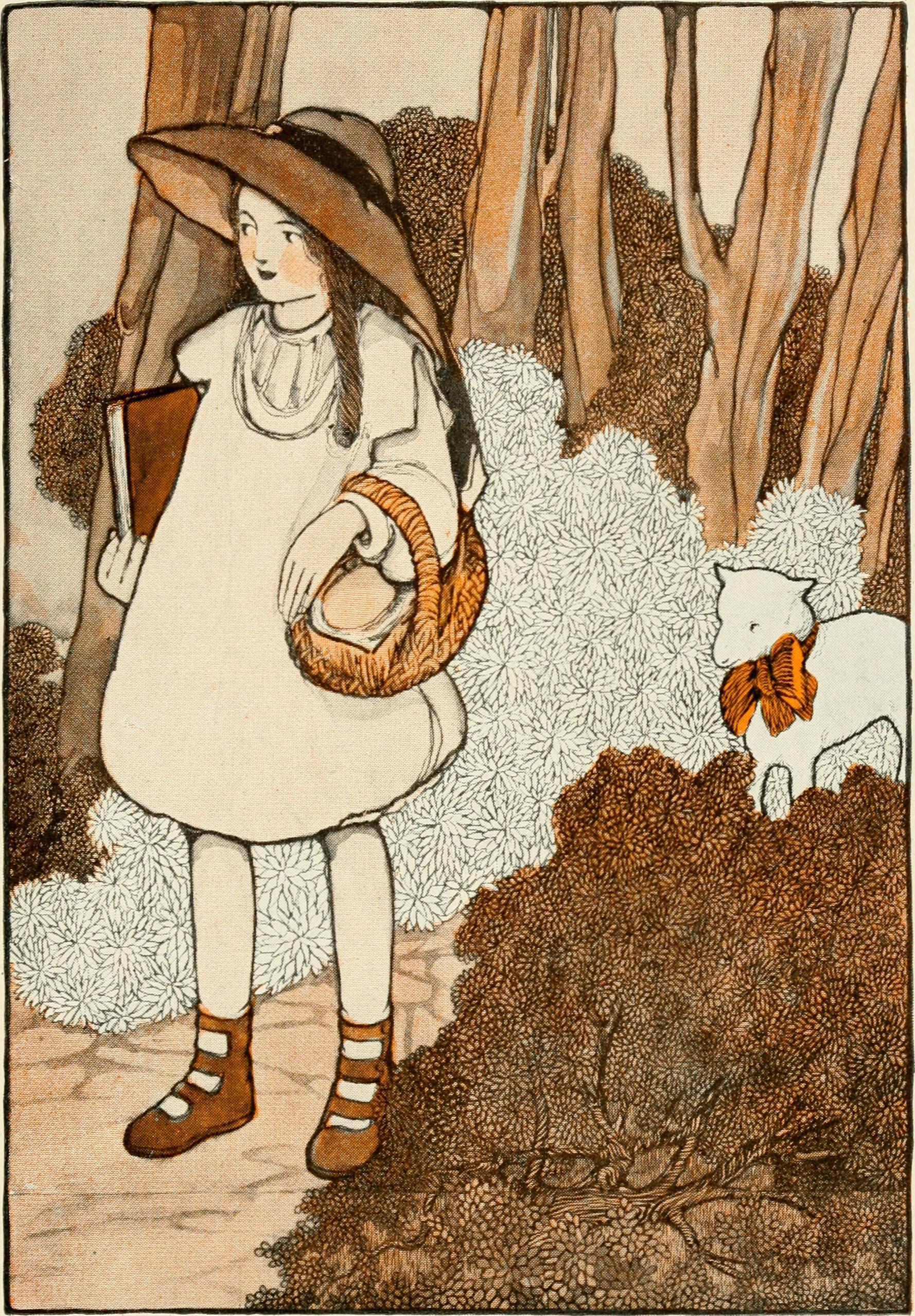
Mary and her Lamb, by Mary R Bassett (1911)

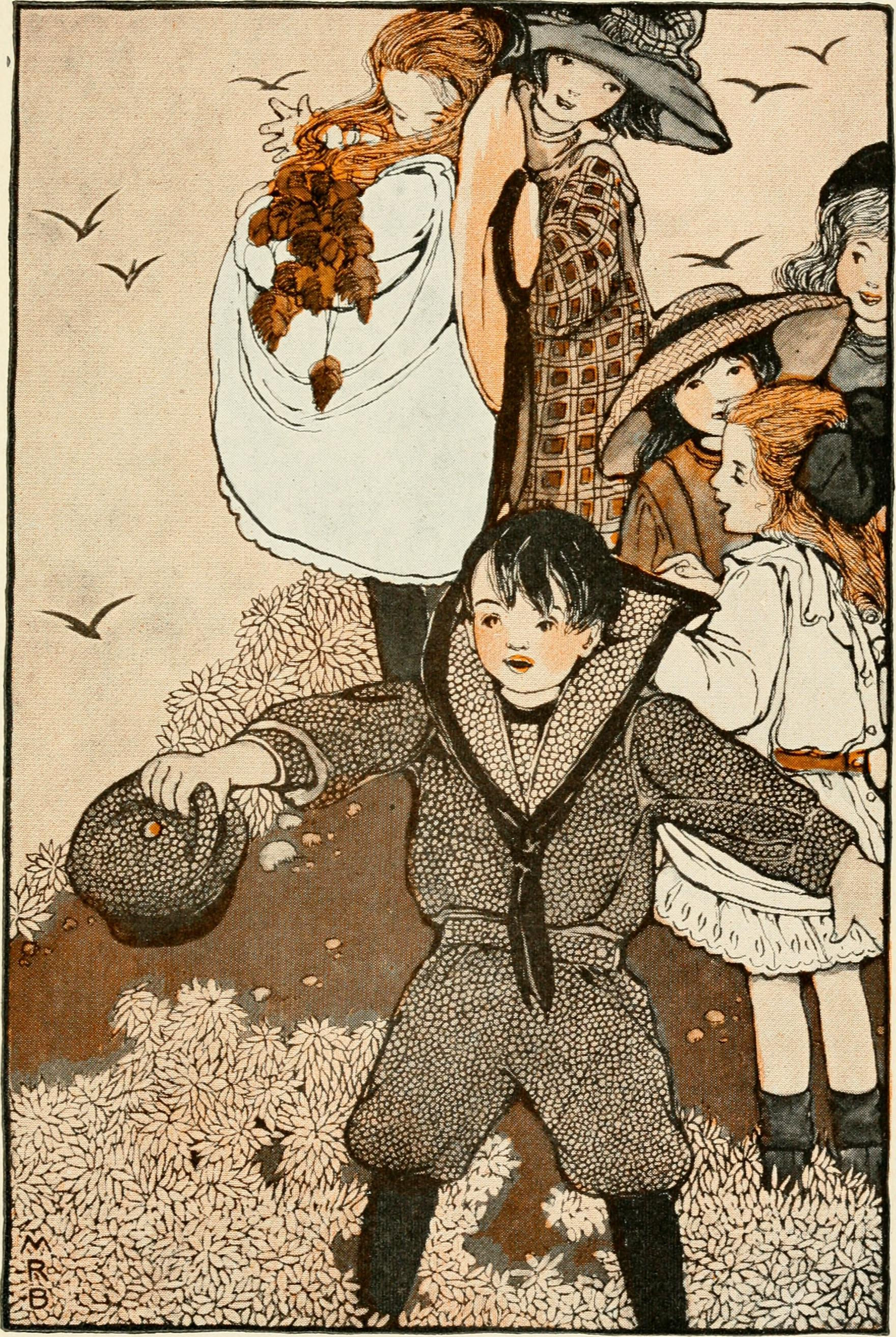
The Holiday, by Mary R Bassett

Mary Robertson Bassett was a late 19th and early 20th century illustrator of magazines and children's books.

== Career ==
Mary Robertson Bassett illustrated magazines such as Ladies' Home Journal, and children's books published by P. F. Volland Company, Baker & Taylor Company, Grosset & Dunlap, and other publishers.

Her illustrations are sold at auction.

== Reception ==
Reviewers noted that her work was "unusually attractive", "charming", "beautifully illustrated", and "not only skilfully made, but also show a most appreciate feeling for the contents of the book." School and Home Education wrote of her work in Fairy Operettas (1916), "The imagination of the reader is agreeably stimulated by the illustrations from the pens and brushes of Mary Robertson Bassett."

== Selected works ==
- Wells, Carolyn, and Mary R. Bassett. Marjorie's New Friend. New York: Grosset & Dunlap, 1909. OCLC 3411644
- Freeman, Mary Eleanor Wilkins, and Mary R. Bassett. The Green Door. New York: Moffat, Yard and Company, 1910. OCLC 5327045
- Johnson, Clifton, and Mary R. Bassett. Little Folks' Book of Verse. New York: Baker & Taylor Co, 1911. OCLC 20809715
- Richards, Laura, and Mary Robertson Bassett. Fairy Operettas. Boston: Little, Brown, 1916. OCLC 5504251
- Croll, Pauline, and Mary R. Bassett. Just for You. Chicago: P.F. Volland Co, 1918. OCLC 610575342
- Johnson, Clifton, Mary R. Bassett and Will Hammell. Poems My Children Love Best of All. New York: Lloyd Adams Noble, 1918. OCLC 21766715
