= Valparaiso, Florida =

- City
- City of Valparaiso
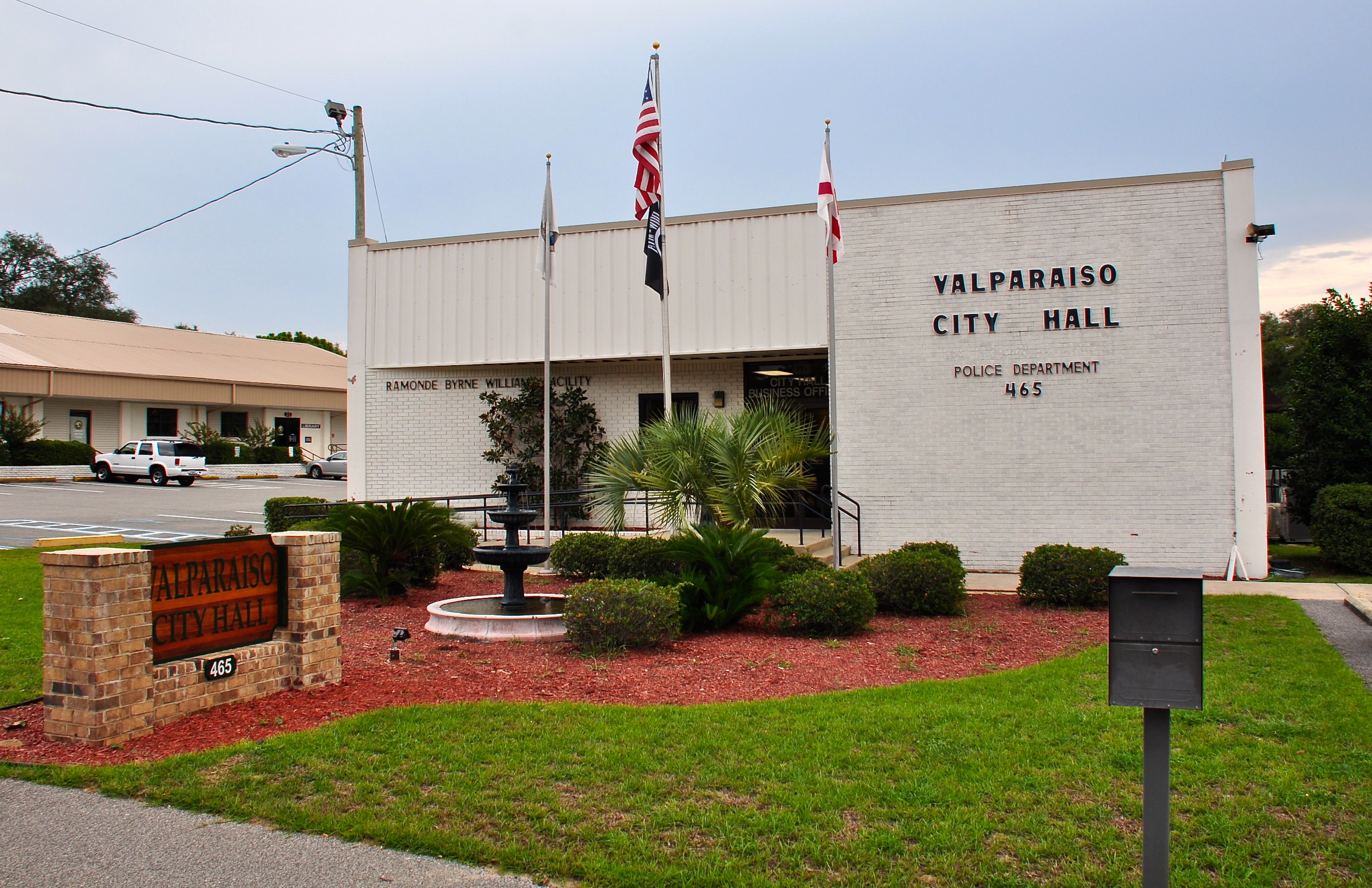
- Valparaiso City Hall, September 2014.

- Seal
- Motto: "Vale of Paradise"
- Location in Okaloosa County and the state of Florida
- Coordinates: 30°29′33″N 86°30′05″W
- Country: United States
- State: Florida
- County: Okaloosa
- Settled: 1901
- Incorporated: 1921
- Named for: Valparaiso, Indiana

Government
  - Type: Mayor-Commission
  - Mayor: Joe Morgan
  - Commissioners: Bryan L. Griffin, Kay Hamilton, Clark "Tom" T. Browning, and Dr. Joshua Latham
  - City Administrator: Carl Scott
  - City Clerk: Tammy Hester Johnson
  - City Attorney: Hayward Dykes

Area
  - Total: 11.83 sq mi (30.63 km^{2})
  - Land: 11.74 sq mi (30.41 km^{2})
  - Water: 0.085 sq mi (0.22 km^{2})
- Elevation: 59 ft (18 m)

Population (2020)
  - Total: 4,752
  - Density: 404.8/sq mi (156.28/km^{2})
- Time zone: UTC-6 (Central (CST))
  - Summer (DST): UTC-5 (CDT)
- ZIP code: 32580
- Area code(s): 850, 448
- FIPS code: 12-73675
- GNIS feature ID: 2405636
- Website: http://www.valp.org/

Valparaiso (/ˌvælpəˈreɪzoʊ/ val-pə-RAY-zoh) is a city in Okaloosa County, Florida, United States. It is part of the Crestview–Fort Walton Beach–Destin, Florida Metropolitan Statistical Area. As of the 2020 census, the city population was 4,752, down from 5,036 at the 2010 census.

== History ==
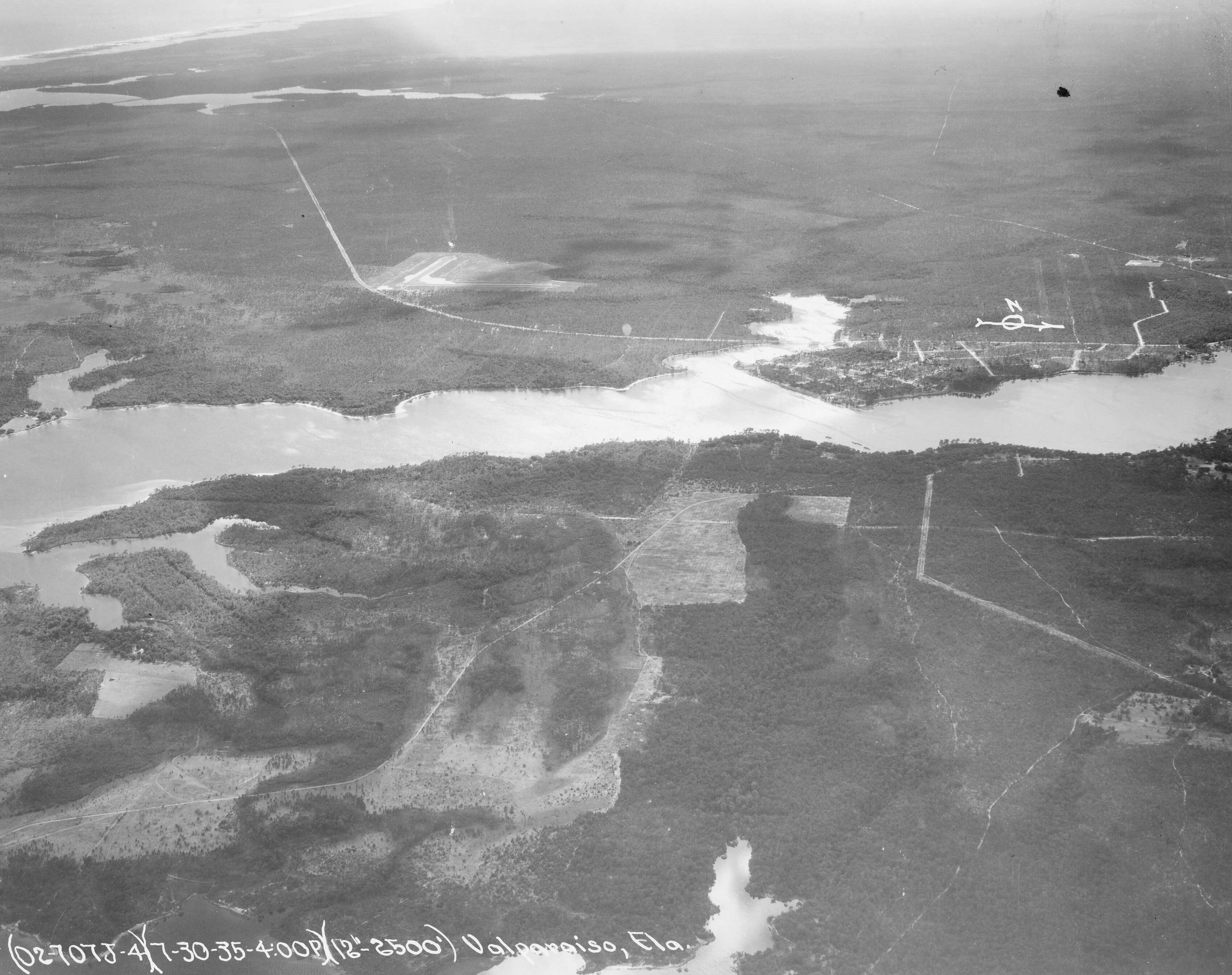
Aerial view, 1935

In 1901, Allen Brown Jr. was the city's first settler who decided to homestead in Valparaiso.

In 1918, a Chicago industrialist named John B. Perrine bought the land from Allen Brown Jr. after visiting the community on a boat trip. He named the community after his original hometown, Valparaiso, Indiana (which in turn was named after Valparaiso, Chile), and is also a twin city with its neighboring city, Niceville. The name of the city is Spanish, and translates to "paradise vale" or "paradise valley", which is why the city's motto is "Vale of Paradise".

The City of Valparaiso was officially incorporated as a municipality in 1921, because Perrine petitioned the Florida Legislature to grant a municipal charter for its incorporation in 1918.

Chicago businessman James E. Plew, who relocated to the Florida Panhandle of Northwest Florida in 1922, became "one of Northwest Florida's pioneer developers," and settled on Valparaiso "as the most likely spot for development". The planned community is between Boggy Bayou and Tom’s Bayou at the western end of Choctawhatchee Bay.

In 1924, he founded the Bank of Valparaiso, constructed the Valparaiso Inn, organized the Chicago Country Club which constructed the Valparaiso Country Club golf course, and was instrumental in many other development activities in the community."

"Other interests of Mr. Plew included the founding of the Shalimar Winery, which was established to use the surplus grape crop of the county. He also founded the Valparaiso Novelty Company, helped to establish a knitting mill in the community and was interested in a number of other enterprises to which he made investments to help their development."

Plew thought that a military payroll would boost the depression-stricken economy of the region. He leased from the city of Valparaiso the Valparaiso Airport, an arrowhead-shaped parcel of 137 acres (0.55 km^{2}) cleared in 1933 as an airdrome.

In 1934, Plew offered the U.S. government 1,460 acres (6 km^{2}) contiguous land for a bombing and gunnery base. This leasehold became the headquarters for the Valparaiso Bombing and Gunnery Base activated on June 14, 1935, under the command of Captain Arnold H. Rich. This was the founding of Eglin Air Force Base. The field was assigned the ICAO airport code VPS for Valparaiso, which Destin-Fort Walton Beach Airport retains to this day. In Niceville, there is an elementary school named in his honor.

== Geography ==
According to the United States Census Bureau, the city has a total area of 12.8 square miles (33 km^{2}), of which 11.9 square miles (31 km^{2}) is land and 0.8 square miles (2.1 km^{2}) (6.35%) is water.

=== Climate ===
The climate is characterized by relatively high temperatures and evenly distributed precipitation throughout the year. Temperatures are high and can lead to warm, humid nights. Summers are usually somewhat wetter than winters, with much of the rainfall coming from convectional thunderstorm activity. The Köppen Climate Classification subtype for this climate is a humid subtropical climate zone (Cfa).

== Demographics ==
Historical population
Census	Pop.	Note	%±
1930	99		—
1940	221		123.2%
1950	1,047		373.8%
1960	5,975		470.7%
1970	6,504		8.9%
1980	6,142		−5.6%
1990	4,672		−23.9%
2000	6,408		37.2%
2010	5,036		−21.4%
2020	4,752		−5.6%
U.S. Decennial Census

=== Racial and ethnic composition ===
Valparaiso racial composition (Hispanics excluded from racial categories) (NH = Non-Hispanic)
Race	Pop 2010	Pop 2020	% 2010	% 2020
White (NH)	4,069	3,493	80.80%	73.51%
Black or African American (NH)	278	220	5.52%	4.63%
Native American or Alaska Native (NH)	30	13	0.60%	0.27%
Asian (NH)	173	161	3.44%	3.39%
Pacific Islander or Native Hawaiian (NH)	8	15	0.16%	0.32%
Some other race (NH)	4	25	0.08%	0.53%
Two or more races/Multiracial (NH)	195	422	3.87%	8.88%
Hispanic or Latino (any race)	279	403	5.54%	8.48%
Total	5,036	4,752		

=== 2020 census ===
As of the 2020 census, Valparaiso had a population of 4,752. The median age was 35.4 years. 18.4% of residents were under the age of 18 and 16.2% of residents were 65 years of age or older. For every 100 females there were 119.1 males, and for every 100 females age 18 and over there were 122.2 males age 18 and over.

As of 2020, 99.0% of residents lived in urban areas, while 1.0% lived in rural areas.

In 2020, there were 1,817 households in Valparaiso, of which 27.1% had children under the age of 18 living in them. Of all households, 46.6% were married-couple households, 23.2% were households with a male householder and no spouse or partner present, and 23.8% were households with a female householder and no spouse or partner present. About 29.2% of all households were made up of individuals and 10.1% had someone living alone who was 65 years of age or older.

In 2020, there were 1,966 housing units, of which 7.6% were vacant. The homeowner vacancy rate was 2.0% and the rental vacancy rate was 7.0%.

According to the 2020 American Community Survey 5-year estimates, there were 1,335 families residing in the city.

=== 2010 census ===
As of the 2010 United States census, there were 5,036 people, 1,700 households, and 899 families residing in the city.

=== 2000 census ===
As of the census of 2000, there were 6,408 people, 1,928 households, and 1,284 families residing in the city. The population density was 536.8 inhabitants per square mile (207.3/km^{2}). There were 2,023 housing units at an average density of 169.5 per square mile (65.4/km^{2}). The racial makeup of the city was 80.77% White, 9.91% African American, 0.64% Native American, 2.67% Asian, 0.11% Pacific Islander, 3.00% from other races, and 2.90% from two or more races. Hispanic or Latino of any race were 9.18% of the population.

In 2000, there were 1,928 households, out of which 30.6% had children under the age of 18 living with them, 52.1% were married couples living together, 10.4% had a female householder with no husband present, and 33.4% were non-families. 28.1% of all households were made up of individuals, and 8.5% had someone living alone who was 65 years of age or older. The average household size was 2.36 and the average family size was 2.87.

In 2000, in the city the population was spread out, with 16.8% under the age of 18, 20.1% from 18 to 24, 31.9% from 25 to 44, 20.3% from 45 to 64, and 10.8% who were 65 years of age or older. The median age was 34 years. For every 100 females, there were 164.7 males. For every 100 females age 18 and over, there were 181.6 males.

In 2000, the median income for a household in the city was $39,521, and the median income for a family was $46,411. Males had a median income of $22,267 versus $18,781 for females. The per capita income for the city was $19,934. About 3.1% of families and 6.7% of the population were below the poverty line, including 8.7% of those under age 18 and 5.4% of those age 65 or over.

== Arts and culture ==
=== Museums and other points of interest ===
The Heritage Museum of Northwest Florida is located in Valparaiso.

== Infrastructure ==
=== Transportation ===
Commercial aircraft fly into nearby Destin-Fort Walton Beach Airport, which also serves the cities of Destin and Fort Walton Beach. Located within Eglin Air Force Base, the airport code VPS is taken from the city of Valparaiso, which is adjacent to the base.
