= Rosenbaum Brothers Department Store =

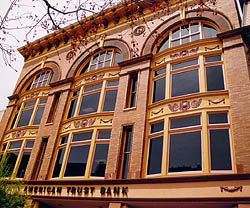
The building's facade

Rosenbaum Brothers Department Store (1849–1971) in its prime was one of the largest department stores between Pittsburgh, Pennsylvania and Baltimore, Maryland. Founded in 1848 in the City of Cumberland, Maryland along Baltimore Street, the Rosenbaum Department store once employed over 200 people. Their building was a 10,000-square-foot (930 m^{2}), five-story building with bay windows. Trimmed stone, anthropomorphic sculptures on the keystones, and lions heads along the roofline comprise a few of the decorative architectal details. The building was constructed in 1897-1898 and opened in 1899.

Today, The Rosenbaum building is vacant.
