= Gertrud Caspari =

German children's illustrator and writer

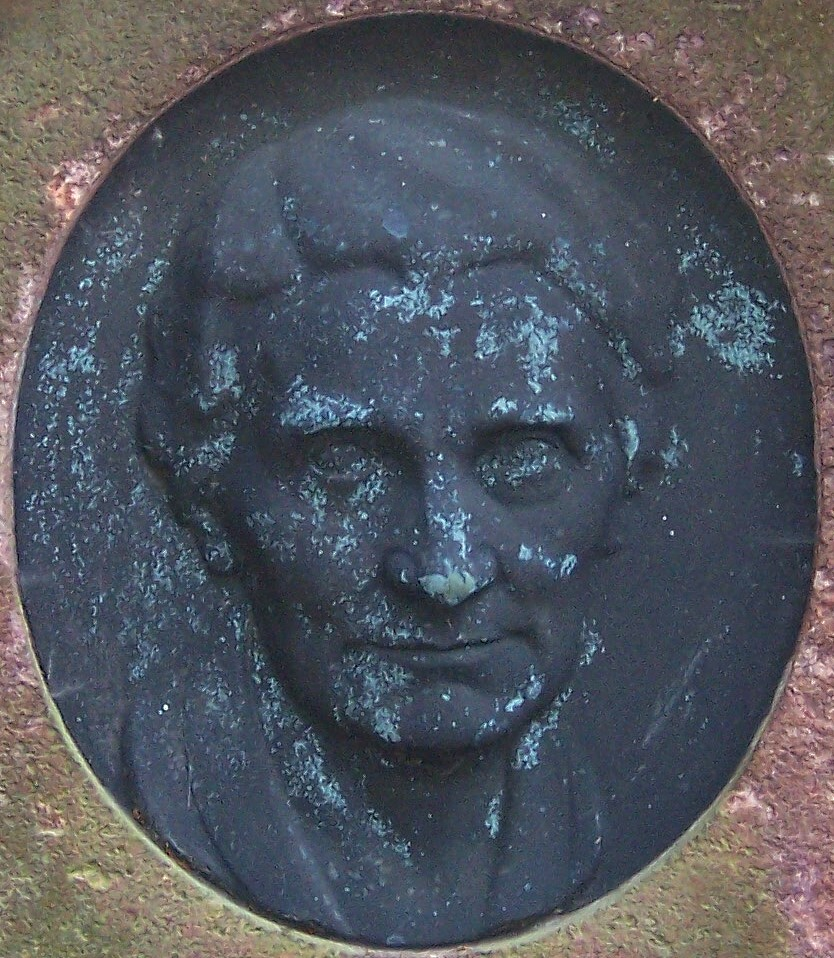
- Grave medallion of Gertrud Caspari
- Born: 22 March 1873; Chemnitz, Germany
- Died: 7 June 1948 (aged 75); Dresden-Klotzsche, Germany
- Education: Dresden School of Applied Arts
- Occupations: Children's book illustrator and writer
- Writing career
- Years active: 1903–1945
- Genre: Picture books
- Notable works: Children's Land, You Magic Land; In the Animal Nursery; Our Child is King

Gertrud Caspari (22 March 1873 – 7 June 1948) was one of the most important German children's book illustrators in the first half of the 20th century, and is recognised as the creator of a "modern toddler" or "Caspari" style.

== Early life and education ==
Gertrud Caspari was born in Chemnitz on 22 March 1873 as the fourth of five children of the merchant Robert Caspari. After the death of her father in 1888, the family moved to Dresden in 1894. Gertrud Caspari worked as a governess for a year, and then studied at the Dresden School of Applied Arts from 1895 to 1898, training to be a teacher. However, she fell seriously ill in 1897 from Graves' disease, which kept her bedridden for many years. It was during that time that she had the idea for a first illustrated children's book.

== Career ==
Her first picture book appeared in 1903 under the title The Living Toy. The following year, she successfully participated in the Arts and Crafts Exhibition in Leipzig, where she showed frieze designs in appliqué. She regularly received orders to illustrate children's books, and also illustrated textbooks and songbooks.

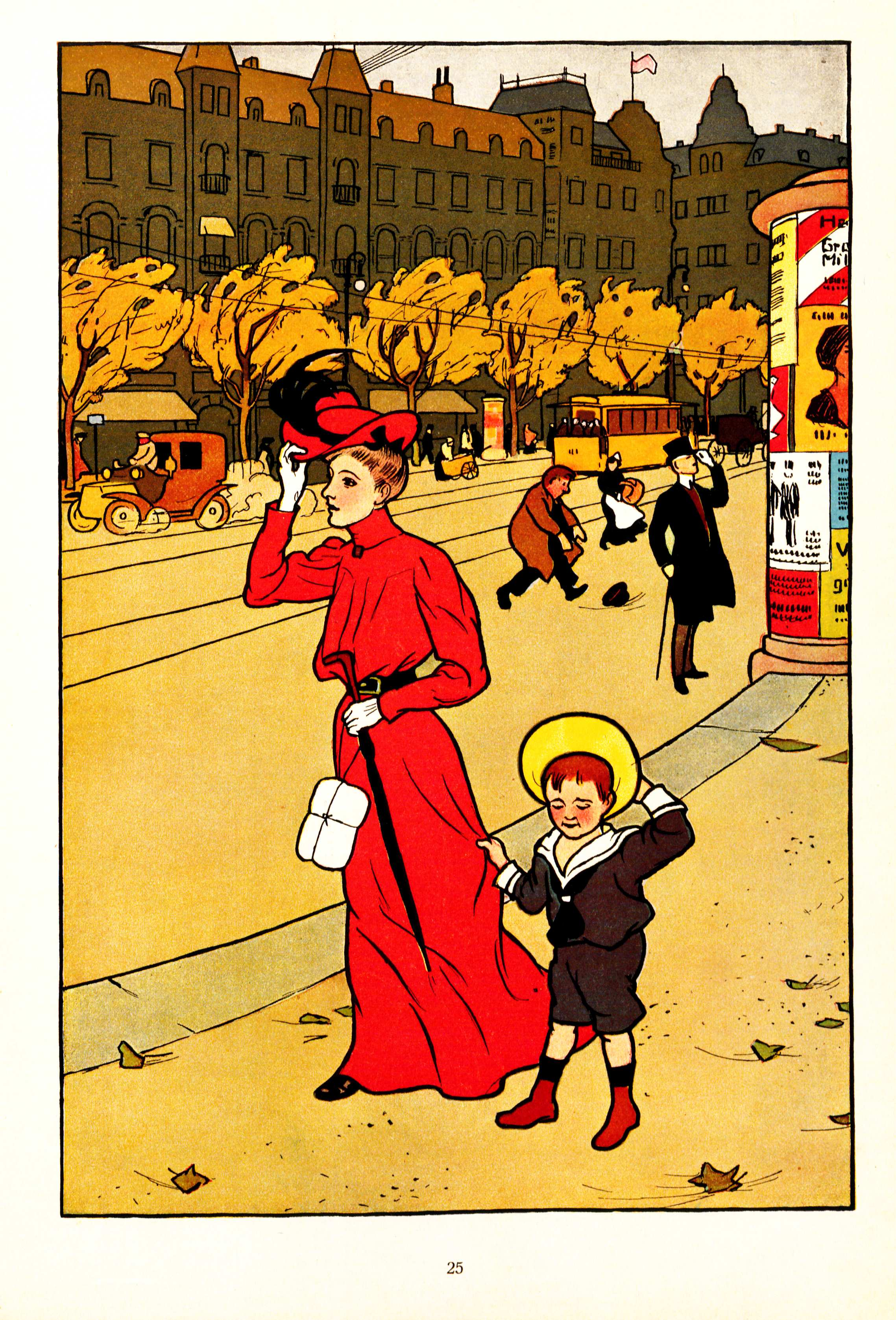
Gertrud Caspari, 'Wind', Children's Humor (1906)

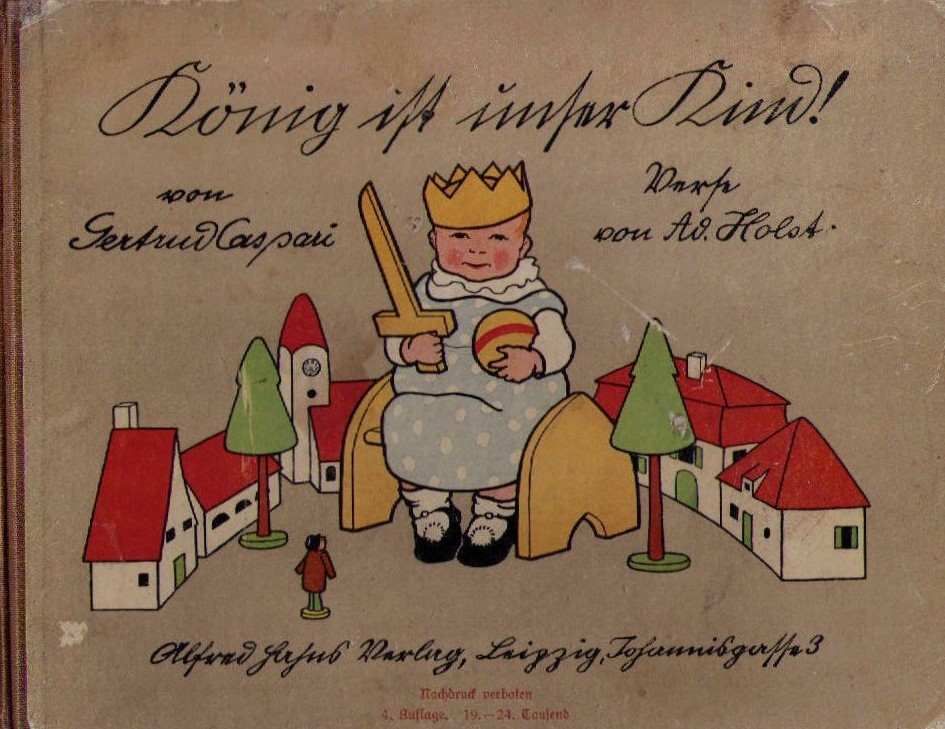
Gertrud Caspari, Our Child is King! (1915)

In 1906, she and her brother Walther Caspari, who worked as a graphic designer for political magazines, were commissioned by the Leipzig teacher's association to create the picture book Kinderhumor für Auge und Ohr (Children's Humor for Eye and Ear). The book was published in 1906 by Verlag Alfred Hahn in Leipzig and established a 40-year cooperation between the publisher and Gertrud Caspari. The author Adolf Holst wrote verses for many of the illustrations.

Her brother Walther died in 1913 at the age of 44, leaving Gertrud Caspari to carry on the work alone. The following year she moved from one part of Dresden, Bühlau, to another, Klotzsche, where she lived until the end of the Second World War. During the time of Nazi Germany, she illustrated educational books for the Ministry of Propaganda. After the war, she was charged with collaboration. Caspari lost her apartment in Klotzsche and spent her last years in Lößnitz in the Ore Mountains.

Caspari published over 50 of her own children's books with illustrations, and illustrated more than 20 other works by other authors. In addition, she designed postcards, games, calendars and even porcelain figures. In 1927, she created murals and stained glass windows for a children's rest home in Jetřichovice (now in the Czech Republic). Her illustrations of baby animals and their parents formed the basis of early arithmetic for many children in the 1920s.

Caspari is considered the creator of a "modern toddler style", which is also referred to as "Caspari style". "Her painting is characterized by large areas, often monochrome backgrounds, simple perspectives, sharp contours, simple figures and a bright-warm color." She also drew scenes of her Saxon homeland.

For Caspari, the format of the book and the thickness of the pages were important in terms of child-friendly handling and she chose materials accordingly. The estate and rights of her works are managed by the Gertrud Caspari Family Foundation. Some of the books have been reissued by the foundation.

== Selected publications ==
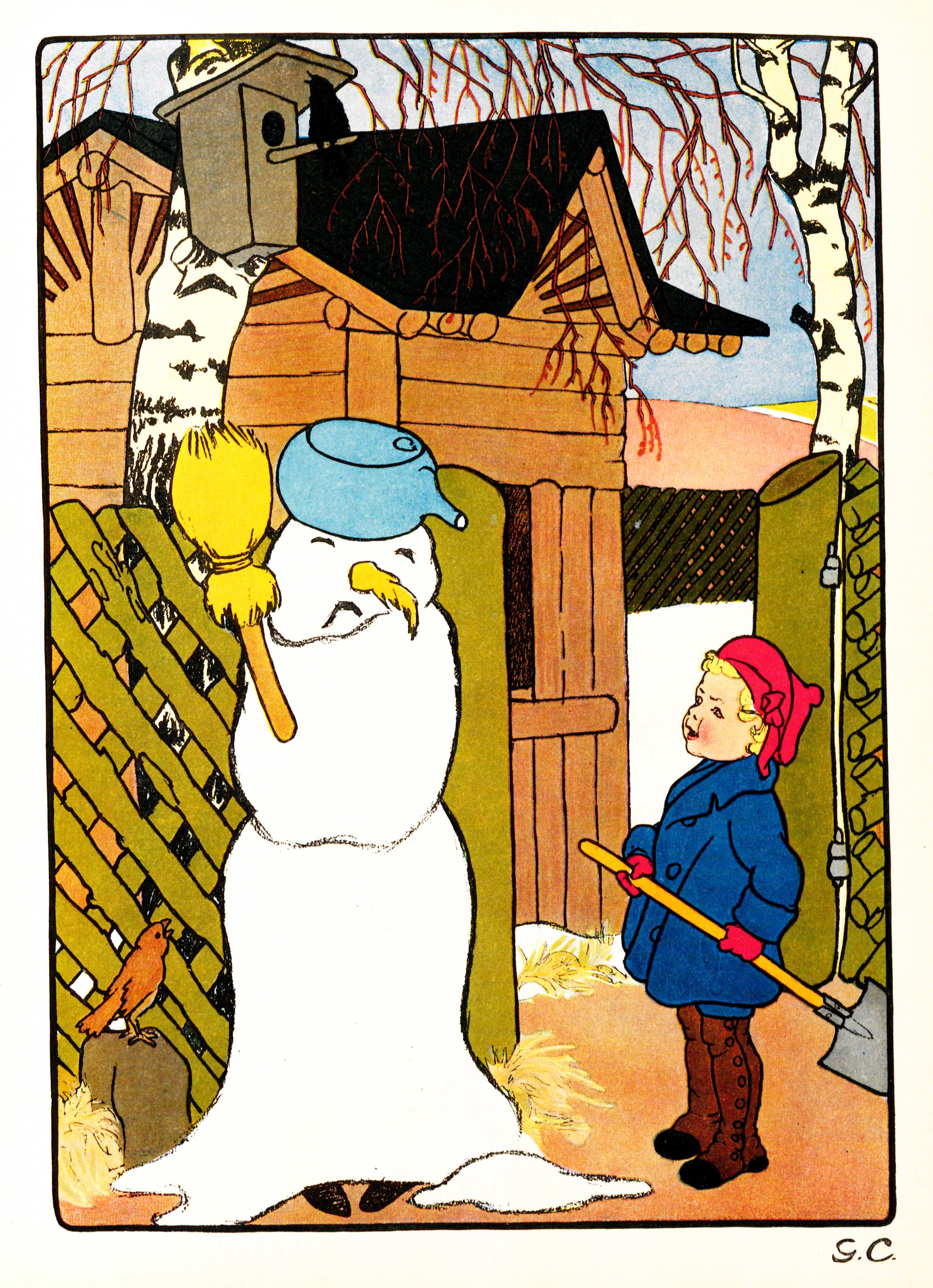
Gertrud Caspari, 'Snowman', Spring

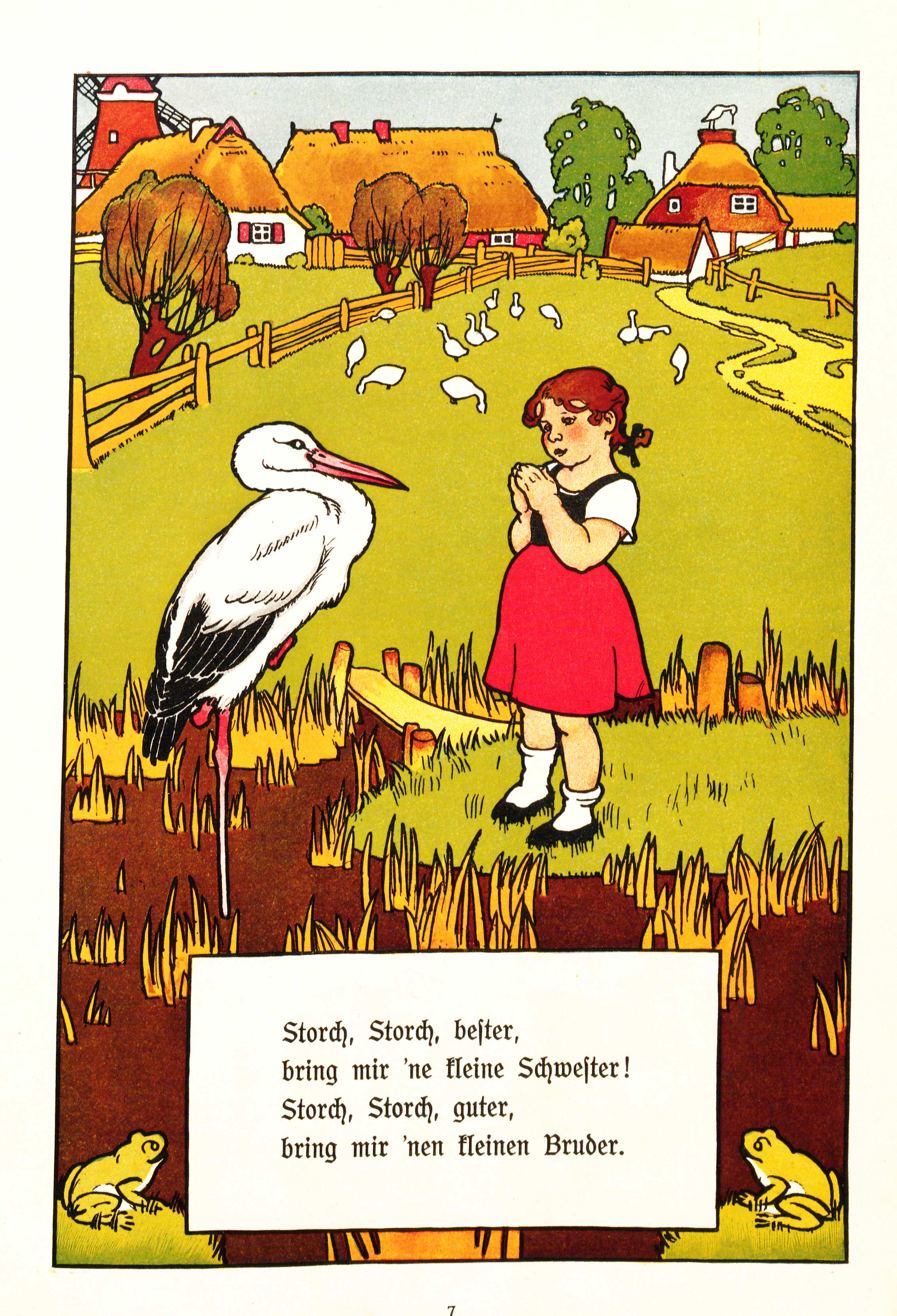
Gertrud Caspari, 'Stork', Children's Humor (1906)

Titles have been translated into English from the original German.

- The Living Toy (Das lebende Spielzeug) (1903)
- The Summer Trip! (Die Sommerreise!) (1905)
- Children's Humor for Eye and Ear (Kinderhumor für Auge und Ohr) (1906)
- Funny Book for Toddlers (Lustiges Kleinkinderbuch) (1907)
- Children's Land, You Magic Land (Kinderland, du Zauberland) (1908)
- Watch and Show Book (Anschauungs- und Darstellungsbuch) (1909)
- Spring, Spring Everywhere! (Frühling, Frühling überall!) (1910)
- Our Child is King (König ist unser Kind) (1910)
- For the Little Ones! (Für die Kleinen!) (1913)
- Caspari Primer (Caspari-Fibel) (1912)
- Seasons (Jahreszeiten) (4 parts, 1912-1915)
- What Is That, My Little Child?: a book for the little ones (Was ist das, mein Kindchen?: ein Buch für die Allerkleinsten) (1913)
- Big People (Große Leute) (1916)
- From My Sketchbook (Aus meinem Skizzenbuch) (1917)
- Look Here (Schau mal her) (1918)
- Good Morning (Guten Morgen) (1918)
- For the Little Ones (Für die lieben Kleinen) (1920)
- In the Animal Nursery (In der Tierkinderstube) (1925)
- Just Come Inside! (Kommt nur herein!) (1925)
- A Very Merry Arithmetic (Eine ganz fidele Rechnerei) (1927)
- The Jolly 1 × 1 for our ABC Beginners (Das lustige 1 × 1 für unsere ABC-Schützen) (1929)
- Come Children! Sing! (Kommt Kinder! Singt!) (1934)
- How Peter got his school satchel (Wie Peter zu seinem Schulranzen kam) (1935)
- The children at "Waldhöhe" and other stories (Die Kinder auf "Waldhöhe" und andere Erzählungen) (1937)

== Death and legacy ==
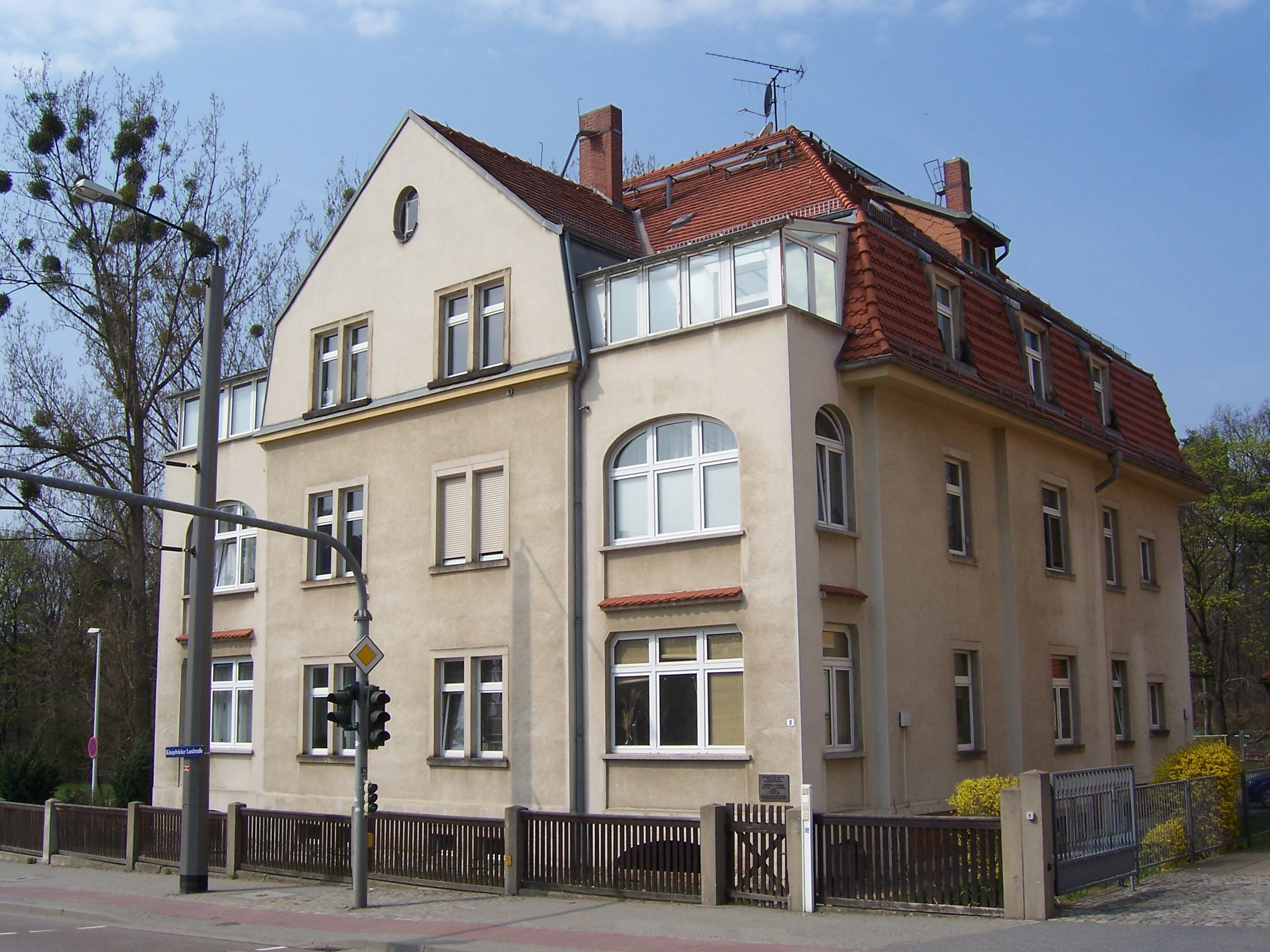
Gertrud Caspari's home

Shortly before her death, she moved back to Dresden. Caspari died on 7 June 1948, in a hospital in Dresden-Klotzsche, of complications from a middle ear operation. Her grave is located in the New Cemetery in Dresden-Klotzsche.

In 1954, a street in Klotzsche was named after Gertrud Caspari. Her home on the Königsbrücker Landstraße 3 has been preserved. In 1998, a memorial plaque was placed on the house commemorating the well-known former resident. In addition, a primary school in the district bears the name Gertrud Caspari.
