= Elizabeth T. Corbett =

American author (1830–1899)

Elizabeth Terhune Corbett (1830–1899) was an American author of poetry and children's books.

== Biography ==
She was born Elizabeth Terhune Bogart in 1830 in New York City.

Her books include Bunch and Joker and Other Stories (1878), Karl and the Queen of Queer-land (1880), Three Wise Old Couples (1881), and Rustic Rhymes and Ballads (1883).

Corbett's story "My Visit to Utopia" has been studied since its 1869 publication in Harper's New Monthly Magazine.

One of her poems was republished in 2004 in a children's picture book under the title Three Wise Old Women with illustrations by Yu-Mei Han. Kirkus Reviews wrote that the illustrator "transform[s] a brief bit of 19th-century nonsense verse into an elaborately silly outing".

Corbett married Robert Henry Corbett around 1850. She died on July 8, 1899, in New York City.

== Works ==
- Bunch and Joker and Other Stories. With Adeline Dutton Train Whitney. 1878.
- Karl and the Queen of Queer-land. American Book Exchange, 1880.
- Three Wise Old Couples. Illustrated by Livingston Hopkins. London et al.: Cassell, Petter, Galpin and Co., 1881.
- Rustic Rhymes and Ballads. New York: Gilliss Bros., 1883.
- Jack and Jill: Comic Opera in Two Acts. Press of Gillis Brothers, 1883.
- Three Wise Old Women. Illustrated by Yu-Mei Han. New York: Dutton, 2004.
