= Frank Hulse =

Frank Wilson Hulse, III (1913 – 1992), founder and former chairman of Southern Airways. He is a member of the Georgia Aviation Hall of Fame.

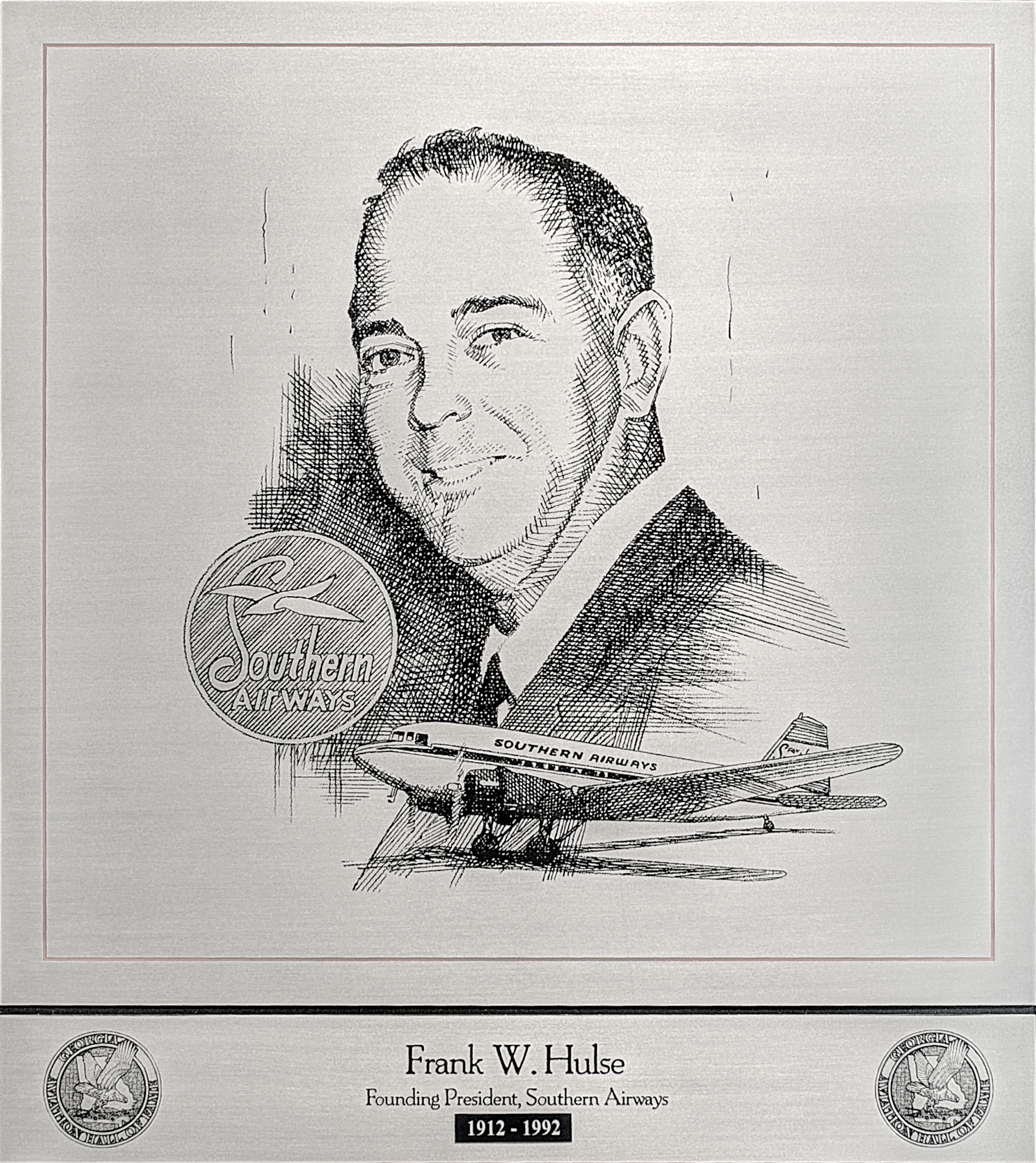
Plaque honoring Hulse at the Georgia Aviation Hall of Fame
