= Southern Airways =

Airline of the United States (1949–1979)

IATA	ICAO	Call sign
SO	SOU	SOUTHERN
- Founded: February 1, 1944
- Ceased operations: July 1, 1979 (merged with North Central Airlines to become Republic Airlines)
- Hubs: Atlanta; Memphis
- Focus cities: New Orleans; Orlando
- Headquarters: Hartsfield–Jackson Atlanta International Airport; Atlanta, Georgia, U.S.
- Founder: Frank Hulse

Southern Airways was a local service carrier, a scheduled airline in the United States that operated from 1949 until 1979, when it merged with North Central Airlines to become Republic Airlines. Southern's corporate headquarters were in Atlanta, with operations headquartered at Hartsfield–Jackson Atlanta International Airport, near Atlanta.

Following a merger with North Central Airlines in 1979, Southern became Republic Airlines, which in turn was merged into Northwest Airlines in 1986. Northwest Airlines was then merged into Delta Air Lines in 2008.

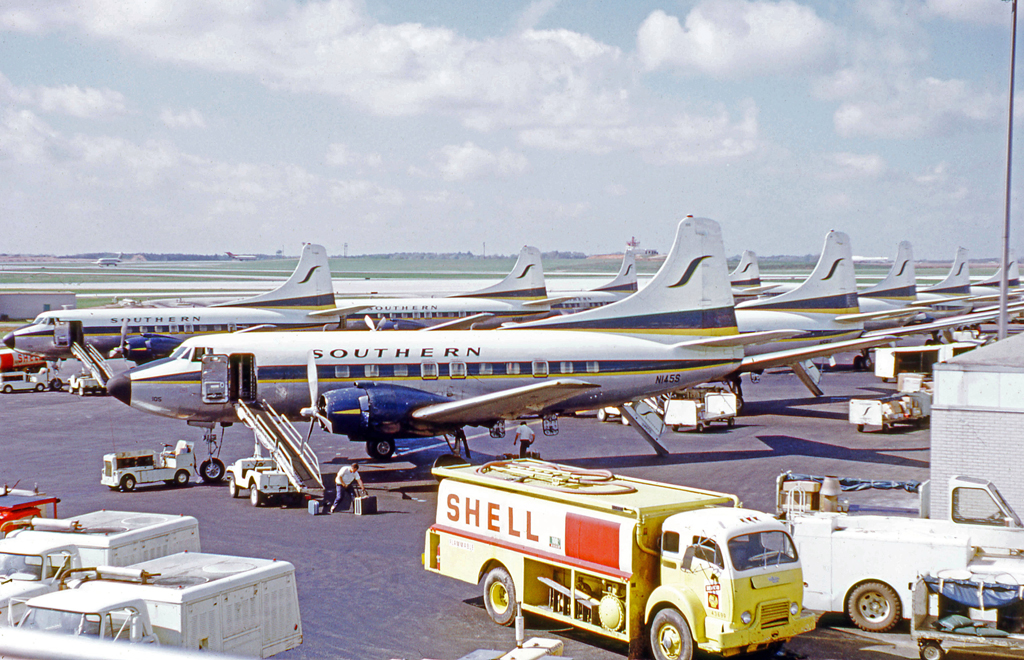
Nine Martin 4-0-4s at the Atlanta hub in 1972 before departing on the morning wave of flights

== History ==
Revenue passenger traffic, in millions of passenger-miles (scheduled flights only)

Year	Pax-Miles
1951	17
1955	28
1960	47
1965	156
1970	431
1975	853

Southern Airways was founded by Frank Hulse and Ike Jones in 1944, followed by its first flight in 1949. As a local service carrier, Southern Airways covered the south-central U.S. In 1955, their network spanned from Memphis south to New Orleans and east to Charlotte and Jacksonville. In August 1953, Southern flew to 29 airports and in August 1967 to 50.

Like other local-service airlines, Southern was subsidized; in 1962, its operating "revenues" of $14.0 million included $5.35 million "Pub. serv. rev."

In May 1968, Southern's routes extended from Tri-Cities in Tennessee south to New Orleans and Jacksonville, and east from Baton Rouge and Monroe, Louisiana, to the coast at Myrtle Beach and Charleston. Later in 1968, a route sprouted northward: three weekday Douglas DC-9-10s from Columbus, Georgia (CSG) nonstop to Washington Dulles and on to New York LaGuardia. These flights originated at Eglin Air Force Base, Florida (VPS) and also stopped at Dothan, Alabama.

Like most local-service airlines, Southern flew only Douglas DC-3s for the first few years. In 1961, they began adding 22 40-passenger, secondhand Martin 4-0-4s acquired from Eastern Air Lines, newer aircraft that were pressurised and had a rear ventral stairway. The last scheduled DC-3 flight was in 1967.

Southern's first 65–75-passenger Douglas DC-9 series 10s arrived in 1967 followed by 85–95-passenger McDonnell Douglas DC-9 series 30s in 1969. The last scheduled flight by a Martin was on 20 April 1978 from Atlanta to Gadsden, Alabama, and back.

Some DC-9s were bought new and some used; the used jets included DC-9-14s from Delta Air Lines and Eastern Air Lines. Both airlines had purchased these aircraft new from Douglas. Unlike other local-service airlines, Southern did not operate turboprops (such as the Convair 580 and Fairchild F-27 used by other local-service airlines) during the 1960s and 1970s, but by the time of the merger with North Central, Southern had replaced their Martin 4-0-4s with several 19-passenger Fairchild Swearingen Metroliner "Metro II" commuter propjets.

=== 1970s ===
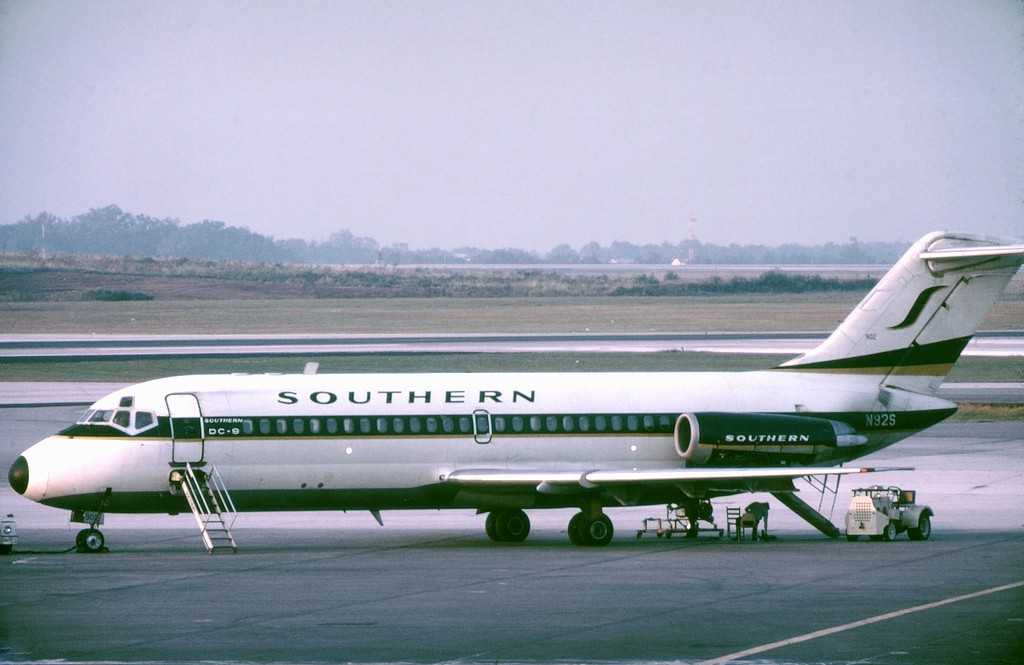
Douglas DC-9-15 at Atlanta in October 1973

By 1971, Southern was flying to New York City and Chicago and south to Orlando and Miami. U.S. government regulation did not allow Southern to fly nonstop from New York or Washington, DC, to Atlanta, so Southern had nonstops to Columbus, Georgia, then on to Dothan, Alabama; Mobile, Alabama; Panama City, Florida, Eglin Air Force Base, Florida; and/or Gulfport/Biloxi, Mississippi. Many flights made five or six intermediate stops en route.

With more DC-9s, many routes once served with propeller aircraft were served with jets that linked small cities to Atlanta and Memphis:

- Columbus, Georgia, to Washington, DC continuing to New York City.
- Meridian, Mississippi, to Birmingham, Alabama; Columbus, Mississippi; and Laurel/Hattiesburg, Mississippi
- Tuscaloosa, Alabama, to Atlanta, Georgia, and Columbus, Mississippi
- Muscle Shoals/Florence, Alabama, to Memphis, Tennessee, and Huntsville/Decatur, Alabama, with continuing eastbound service to Atlanta
- Greenville, Mississippi, to Memphis and Monroe, Louisiana, with continuing southbound service to Baton Rouge and New Orleans
- Columbia, South Carolina, to Greenville/Spartanburg and Charleston, South Carolina
- Albany, Georgia, to Atlanta, Georgia; Valdosta, Georgia; Dothan, Alabama; and Columbus, Georgia

One DC-9-14 aircraft operated a "milk run" multistop routing from Miami to Orlando, Tallahassee, Panama City, Eglin AFB, Mobile, Gulfport, New Orleans, Birmingham, Atlanta, Huntsville, Memphis, St Louis, and Chicago Midway. Time en route was 14 hours and 32 minutes.

By the mid-1970s, Southern's system had expanded to St. Louis, Detroit, Ft. Lauderdale, and Grand Cayman in the Caribbean, Southern's only international destination. In 1978 Southern expanded westward from Memphis to Wichita and Denver.

Southern Airways called itself the "Route of the Aristocrats" and they used the slogan "Nobody's Second Class on Southern" in their television commercials. They were famous for their promotional shot glasses: for a time, differently designed shot glasses were issued each year. Original Southern shot glasses are valued by collectors of airline memorabilia.

During the early 1970s, before strict airport security was implemented across the United States, several airlines experienced hijackings. Southern Airways Flight 49, a DC-9 en route from Memphis to Miami was hijacked on November 10, 1972, during a stop in Birmingham. The three hijackers boarded the plane armed with handguns and hand grenades. At gunpoint, the hijackers took the airplane, the plane's crew of four, and 27 passengers, to nine American cities, Toronto, and eventually to Havana, Cuba. During the long flight, the hijackers threatened to crash the plane into the Oak Ridge, Tennessee, nuclear facilities, insisted on talking with President Richard Nixon, and demanded a ransom of $10 million. Southern Airways was only able to come up with $2 million. Eventually, the pilot talked the hijackers into settling for the $2 million when the plane landed in Chattanooga for refueling. Upon landing in Havana, the Cuban authorities arrested the hijackers, and after a brief delay, sent the plane, passengers, and crew back to the United States. The hijackers and $2 million stayed in Cuba.

Southern Airways accounted for the $2 million by debiting it to an account entitled "Hijacking Payment". This account was reported as a type of receivable under "other assets" on Southern's balance sheet. The company maintained that they would be able to collect the cash from the Cuban government, so a receivable existed. Southern Airways was repaid $2 million by the Cuban government, which was attempting to improve relations with the United States.

=== Difficulties and merger ===
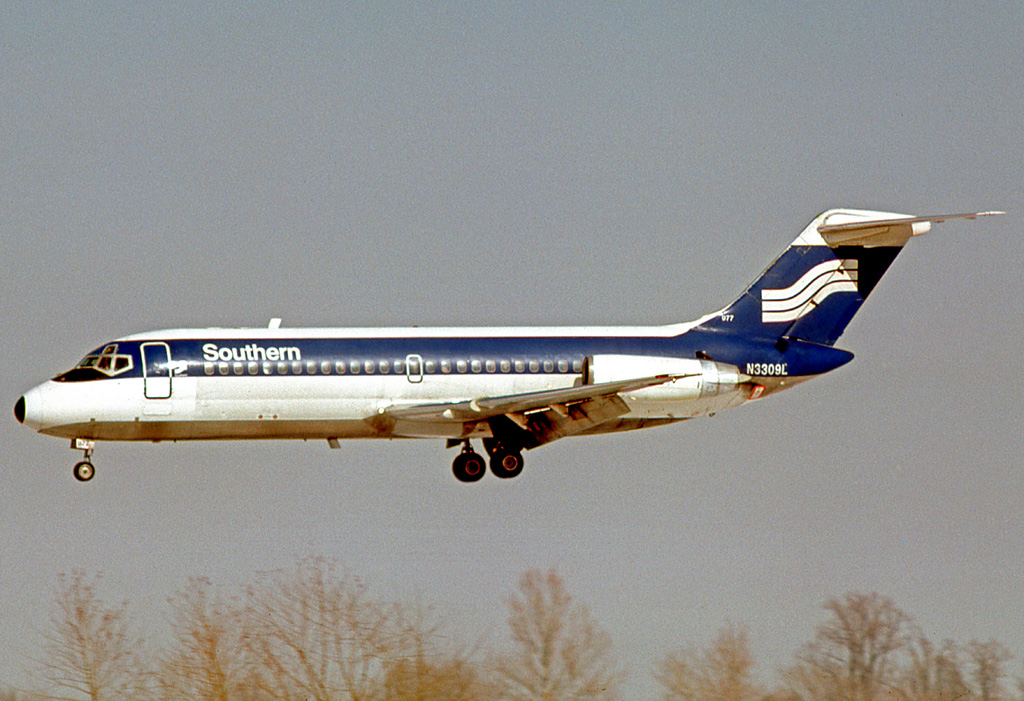
Douglas DC-9-14 in final color scheme at St Louis in February 1978

By the late 1970s, Southern Airways began to experience difficulties. Two fatal accidents (Southern Airways Flight 932, November 14, 1970, and Southern Airways Flight 242, April 4, 1977) had put negative impact on the airline's once excellent safety record. Improved highways including the interstate freeway system coupled with an increased willingness of passengers to drive to airports farther away for more convenient flights or lower air fares made many of Southern's routes obsolete. With dramatic increases in the price of jet fuel in the 1970s, many of Southern's routes were no longer cost effective.

On July 1, 1979, Southern merged with North Central Airlines to form Republic Airlines and the "Route of the Aristocrats" came to an end. Republic acquired Hughes Airwest before being acquired in 1986 by Northwest Airlines, which continued to operate many flights from the former Southern hub in Memphis. Northwest merged into Delta Air Lines in 2008.

== Destinations ==
- Albany, Georgia
- Anderson, South Carolina
- Anniston, Alabama
- Athens, Georgia
- Atlanta, Georgia (hub)
- Augusta, Georgia
- Baton Rouge, Louisiana
- Biloxi, Mississippi (served via Gulfport, Mississippi)
- Birmingham, Alabama
- Bristol, Tennessee (served via the Tri-Cities Regional Airport) in Tennessee)
- Bristol, Virginia (served via the Tri-Cities Regional Airport in Tennessee)
- Charleston, South Carolina
- Charlotte, North Carolina
- Chattanooga, Tennessee
- Chicago, Illinois Midway Airport, later O'Hare Airport
- Clarksdale, Mississippi
- Clarksville, Tennessee
- Columbia, South Carolina
- Columbus, Georgia
- Columbus, Mississippi
- Corinth, Mississippi
- Crossville, Tennessee
- Decatur, Alabama
- Denver, Colorado
- Detroit, Michigan
- Dothan, Alabama
- Dyersburg, Tennessee
- Eglin Air Force Base, Florida (airport serves Fort Walton Beach, Florida, and Destin, Florida)
- Fort Lauderdale, Florida
- Florence, Alabama (served via Muscle Shoals, Alabama}
- Gadsden, Alabama
- Grand Cayman, Cayman Islands (only international destination served by Southern)
- Greenville, Mississippi
- Greenville, South Carolina/Spartanburg, South Carolina
- Greenwood, Mississippi
- Greenwood, South Carolina
- Gulfport, Mississippi
- Hattiesburg, Mississippi
- Huntsville, Alabama
- Jackson, Mississippi
- Jackson, Tennessee
- Jacksonville, Florida
- Johnson City, Tennessee (served via the Tri-Cities Regional Airport in Tennessee)
- Kingsport, Tennessee (served via Tri-Cities Regional Airport in Tennessee)
- Knoxville, Tennessee
- LaGrange, Georgia
- Laurel, Mississippi
- Macon, Georgia
- Memphis, Tennessee (hub)
- Meridian, Mississippi
- Milwaukee, Wisconsin
- Minneapolis/St. Paul, Minnesota
- Mobile, Alabama
- Monroe, Louisiana
- Montgomery, Alabama
- Morgantown, West Virginia
- Morristown, Tennessee
- Moultrie, Georgia
- Muscle Shoals, Alabama
- Myrtle Beach, South Carolina
- Nashville, Tennessee
- Natchez, Mississippi
- New Orleans, Louisiana (focus city)
- New York City, New York LaGuardia Airport,
- Orlando, Florida (focus city)
- Panama City, Florida
- Paris, Tennessee
- Pascagoula, Mississippi
- Rockwood, Tennessee
- St. Louis, Missouri
- Selma, Alabama
- Sheffield, Alabama (served via Muscle Shoals, Alabama)
- Shelbyville, Tennessee
- Tallahassee, Florida
- Tampa, Florida
- Tullahoma, Tennessee
- Tri-Cities Regional Airport in Tennessee (serves the Bristol/Kingsport/Johnson City area)
- Tupelo, Mississippi
- Tuscaloosa, Alabama
- Tuscumbia, Alabama (served via Muscle Shoals, Alabama)
- Union City, Tennessee
- University, Mississippi/Oxford, Mississippi
- Washington, D.C. Dulles Airport
- West Memphis, AR (served via Memphis, Tennessee)
- Wichita, Kansas
- Valdosta, Georgia
- Vicksburg, Mississippi

Timetable dates used to compile the above list: July 1, 1950; Sept. 26, 1954; Nov. 1, 1960; June 18, 1962; July 1, 1964; June 1, 1966; Sept. 3, 1968; Dec. 1, 1973; July 1, 1974, July 1, 1978, and April 29, 1979.

== Fleet ==
Southern Airways used to operate the following aircraft:

Southern Airways fleet
Aircraft	Total	Introduced	Retired	Notes
Beechcraft Model 18	17	1946	1964	
Douglas DC-3	27	1949	1967	
Fairchild Swearingen Metroliner	8	1977	1979	"Metro II" series commuter
Martin 4-0-4	25	1961	1978	
McDonnell Douglas DC-9-14	25	1968	1979	
McDonnell Douglas DC-9-15	10	1967	1979	Includes two "Rapid Change" variants
McDonnell Douglas DC-9-31	9	1969	1979	
McDonnell Douglas DC-9-32CF	1	1978	1979	

== See also ==
- List of defunct airlines of the United States
