= National Register of Historic Places listings in Okaloosa County, Florida =

Location of Okaloosa County in Florida

This is a list of the National Register of Historic Places listings in Okaloosa County, Florida.

This is intended to be a complete list of the properties and districts on the National Register of Historic Places in Okaloosa County, Florida, United States. The locations of National Register properties and districts for which the latitude and longitude coordinates are included below, may be seen in a map.

There are 9 properties and districts listed on the National Register in the county, including 1 National Historic Landmark. Another property was once listed but has been removed.

This National Park Service list is complete through NPS recent listings posted August 7, 2026.

Contents: Counties in Florida (non-linked contain no National Register listings)
Alachua - Baker - Bay - Bradford - Brevard - Broward - Calhoun - Charlotte - Citrus - Clay - Collier - Columbia - DeSoto - Dixie - Duval - Escambia - Flagler - Franklin - Gadsden - Gilchrist - Glades - Gulf - Hamilton - Hardee - Hendry - Hernando - Highlands - Hillsborough (Tampa) - Holmes - Indian River - Jackson - Jefferson - Lafayette - Lake - Lee - Leon - Levy - Liberty - Madison - Manatee - Marion - Martin - Miami-Dade (Miami) - Monroe - Nassau - Okaloosa - Okeechobee - Orange - Osceola - Palm Beach - Pasco - Pinellas - Polk - Putnam - St. Johns - St. Lucie - Santa Rosa - Sarasota - Seminole - Sumter - Suwannee - Taylor - Union - Volusia - Wakulla - Walton - Washington

== Current listings ==
	Name on the Register	Image	Date listed	Location	City or town	Description
1	Camp Pinchot Historic District	Camp Pinchot Historic District	October 22, 1998 (#98001255)	Eglin Air Force Base, roughly east bank Garnier's Bayou, approximately ½ mile north of Fort Walton Beach; 30°28′13″N 86°35′38″W	Fort Walton Beach	
2	Crestview Commercial Historic District	Crestview Commercial Historic District	July 20, 2006 (#06000620)	Roughly bounded by Industrial Drive, North Ferdon Boulevard, North Wilson Street, and James Lee Boulevard; 30°45′33″N 86°34′15″W	Crestview	
3	Eglin Field Historic District	Eglin Field Historic District	October 22, 1998 (#98001254)	Eglin Air Force Base, roughly bounded by Barranca, Choctawhatchee, Fourth, and "F" Avenues; 30°28′58″N 86°29′30″W	Fort Walton Beach	
4	Fort Walton Mound	Fort Walton Mound	October 15, 1966 (#66000268)	139 Miracle Strip Parkway Southeast; 30°24′13″N 86°36′27″W	Fort Walton Beach	
5	Gulfview Hotel Historic District	Gulfview Hotel Historic District	October 22, 1992 (#92001402)	12 Miracle Strip Parkway Southeast; 30°24′15″N 86°36′30″W	Fort Walton Beach	In 2018, the main hotel building was relocated to 115 Miracle Strip Parkway S.E. and opened the following year for multiple usage including a welcome center.
6	McKinley Climatic Laboratory	McKinley Climatic Laboratory	October 6, 1997 (#97001145)	Building 440 at Eglin Air Force Base; 30°28′33″N 86°30′27″W	Fort Walton Beach	
7	Operation Crossbow Site		October 22, 1998 (#98001256)	Address Restricted	Eglin Air Force Base	
8	World War II JB-2 Launch Site	World War II JB-2 Launch Site	April 19, 1996 (#96000395)	Address Restricted	Fort Walton Beach	
9	World War II JB-2 Mobile Launch Site	World War II JB-2 Mobile Launch Site	April 17, 1996 (#96000394)	Address Restricted	Fort Walton Beach	

== Former listing ==
	Name on the Register	Image	Date listed	Date removed	Location	City or town	Description
1	Valparaiso Inn		August 1, 1978 (#78000954)	1981	331 Bayshore Dr. 30°30′02″N 86°29′36″W	Valparaiso	Severely damaged in a fire March 2, 1977. Completely destroyed by a second fire October 25, 1980.

== See also ==
- List of National Historic Landmarks in Florida
- National Register of Historic Places listings in Florida
