= Ashley Chadbourne McKinley =

American aviator and United States Army officer

- Born: June 23, 1896; Marshall, Texas
- Died: February 11, 1970 (aged 73); Florida
- Burial place: Arlington National Cemetery
- Military career
- Allegiance: United States of America
- Branch: National Guard; United States Army; United States Air Force
- Service years: 1916–1926; 1941–1956
- Rank: Colonel
- Awards: Distinguished Flying Cross

Ashley Chadbourne McKinley (June 23, 1896 – February 11, 1970) was an accomplished American aerial photographer and colonel in the U.S. Army Air Corps who helped pioneer aviation at subzero temperatures. He accompanied Richard E. Byrd as an aerial photographer on his expedition to the South Pole.

== Career ==
McKinley joined Battery A of the Missouri National Guard on June 21, 1916, and served on the Mexican Border until December 21 of the same year. Following the United States' entry into the First World War, he enlisted in the United States Army Signal Corps on August 7, 1917, and became a dirigible pilot. He was commissioned as a 1st lieutenant in the Officer's Reserve Corps on December 7, 1917, to date from November 27. He was placed on active duty on December 16, 1917.

During World War I, he commanded a balloon observation company. He later taught aerial photography and surveying. He was promoted to the rank of captain on November 20, 1918, shortly after the armistice.

Due to the post war draw down, McKinley's appointment as captain was vacated and he was made a 2nd lieutenant in the Army Air Service on September 21, 1920 (to rank from July 1, 1920). He was promoted to 1st lieutenant on April 12, 1921.

On April 3, 1926, McKinley resigned from the Army to begin an aerial survey and photography service. In 1928–1929, he was a photographer for the Byrd Antarctic Expedition. He was one of four men (along with Richard Byrd, Bernt Balchen and Harold June) aboard the first aircraft to fly over the South Pole on November 29, 1929. He was decorated with the Distinguished Flying Cross by Secretary of War Patrick J. Hurley on July 9, 1930.

=== World War II ===
In 1941, as the United States prepared to enter the Second World War, McKinley rejoined the Army Air Corps as a major. He was in charge of the cold-weather operations of the Army Air Force at Ladd Field in Fairbanks, Alaska. McKinley was the first person to suggest that U.S. aircraft be constructed to operate in subzero temperatures and that the Air Force should build a facility to test aircraft in subzero temperatures. He was transferred to Eglin Field for the construction of the facility, which became the McKinley Climatic Laboratory. He had risen to the rank of colonel by the war's end in 1945.

=== Post war ===
In 1947 McKinley transferred from the Army to the newly created United States Air Force. He served in Korea in 1951 during the Korean War with the rank of colonel.

After retiring from the Air Force as a colonel on June 30, 1956, McKinley worked as a civilian consultant to Admiral Richard Byrd.

In 1959 he became a member of the Florida Society of the Sons of the American Revolution.

McKinley died in Florida in 1970 and is buried in Arlington National Cemetery.

== Legacy ==
In June 1971, the McKinley Climatic Laboratory at Eglin Air Force Base was named in his honor.

== Books and film ==
- McKinley authored a 1929 book with Athos Maxwell Narraway, Applied aerial photography
- McKinley appeared in the 1930 documentary With Byrd at the South Pole

== Awards ==
- Distinguished Flying Cross
- Byrd Antarctic Expedition Medal
- World War I Victory Medal
- American Defense Service Medal
- American Campaign Medal
- Asiatic-Pacific Campaign Medal
- World War II Victory Medal
- National Defense Service Medal
- Korean Service Medal
- Air Force Longevity Service Ribbon with one silver oak leaf cluster (6 awards)
- United Nations Korea Medal

=== Distinguished Flying Cross citation ===
The President of the United States of America, authorized by Act of Congress, July 2, 1926, takes pleasure in presenting the Distinguished Flying Cross to Captain (Air Corps) Ashley C. McKinley, U.S. Army Air Corps (Reserve), for extraordinary achievement while participating in an aerial flight as aerial photographer for the 1928 – 1930 Byrd Antarctic Expedition. Captain McKinley, in the face of the very gravest danger performed his duties in such a manner as to merit the highest praise. He participated in numerous flights over the South Pole on 28–29 November 1929. His devotion to and the accomplishment of this duty obtained results which brought great credit to himself, the expedition, and the United States Army.

General Orders: War Department, General Orders No. 2 (1931)
