= Biancur Field =

Biancur Field Eglin Air Force Base Auxiliary Field #6
- Part of Air Force Materiel Command (AFMC)
- Located near: Valparaiso, Florida
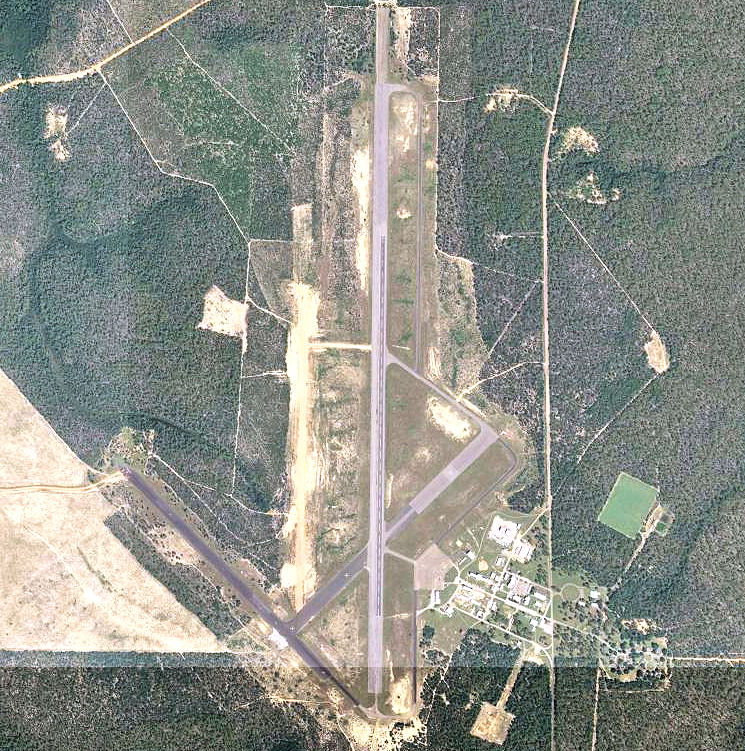
- 2006 USGS airphoto

Site information
- Controlled by: United States Air Force; Eglin Air Force Base

Location
- Coordinates: 30°37′54″N 086°44′27″W

Site history
- Built: 1941
- In use: 1943-1959; 1970-present
- Battles/wars: World War II

Airfield information
- Identifiers: FAA LID: FL34, WMO: 725540
- Elevation: 37 metres (121 ft) AMSL
Runways
Direction	Length and surface
18/36	1,531 metres (5,023 ft) Asphalt

Biancur Field, (Eglin Air Force Base Auxiliary Field #6), (FAA LID: FL34), is a satellite airfield located northwest of the Main Base, 5.9 miles north-northeast of Valparaiso, Florida. It is also known as site "Test Site B6".

== Overview ==
The U.S. Army Ranger facility Camp Rudder is located here. It is designated Site B-6. The airfield remains under the ownership of the United States Air Force, and is under the jurisdiction of the 96th Test Wing (96 TW) at Eglin AFB.

== History ==
Auxiliary Field 6 is named Biancur Field for 1st Lieutenant Andrew Biancur, a test pilot of the Medium Bombardment Section of the 1st Proving Ground Group, killed 8 January 1944 in the crash of a prototype YP-61-NO Black Widow night fighter aircraft, AAF Ser. No. 41-18883, c/n 711, at Eglin Field.

The history of Biancur Field is largely unknown, and the exact date of construction of Biancur Field is undetermined. It was opened in 1943 and was constructed in a similar manner to a fully equipped base with three 4,000 feet (1,200 m) runways, a large parking ramp, at least one hangar and numerous support buildings. The airfield was expanded sometime after the war, with an 8,000 feet (2,400 m) jet-capable runway laid down over the north/south runway, Runway 18/36. The airfield was incorporated into Eglin AFB on 9 October 1959 and was subsequently inactivated. During the early 1960s (and specifically October 1962, the time of the Cuban Missile Crisis), Field 6 was used for "touch & goes" by the Navy's Training Squadron FOUR (VT-4), at the time when VT-4 was a Student Naval Aviator strike jet pipeline training squadron based at Sherman Field, at nearby NAS Pensacola. As there was no mess hall, food was brought in from the Army Rangers at nearby Field 7.

Biancur was reactivated in 1970 as an Army Special Forces group facility, led by Col Arthur D. "Bull" Simons, for training select Army Special Forces and USAF Air Commando forces before deploying to Thailand for the attempted rescue on 20-21 Nov 1970 of US prisoners of war at the Son Tay prison camp in North Vietnam (Operation Ivory Coast).

Afterwards, the United States Army Ranger training camp at Epler Field (Eglin AFB Auxiliary Field #7) moved to Biancur Field to provide realistic jungle/swamp training. Today, the ground station has numerous modern buildings and the north-south airfield runway has been updated for use by helicopters with several hangars. Several UH-60 Black Hawk helicopters are parked on the ramp in recent aerial imagery of the airfield.

The airfield also supports other USAF, DoD and other U.S. government agency requirements as necessary, one example being the NASA X-43 low-speed demonstrator that underwent testing out of Auxiliary Field 6 in November 2003.

=== Federal Prison Camp ===
A low security Federal Prison Camp, established under a maintenance contract with the Air Force, was originally located at the old Niceville Road Prison where German POWs had been incarcerated during World War II. It was moved to a 28-acre (110,000 m^{2}) compound at Auxiliary Field 6 in November 1969, and served as a minimum security facility for non-violent offenders where it would gain the nickname "Club Fed". The facility was closed in 2006 as a cost-cutting measure, with most of the prisoners transferred to the Pensacola Federal Prison Camp at the former NAS Saufley Field, now part of the greater NAS Pensacola complex, in December 2005.

== See also ==
- Florida World War II Army Airfields
