= Epler Field =

Epler Field Eglin Air Force Base Auxiliary Field #7
- Part of Air Force Materiel Command (AFMC)
- Located near: Valparaiso, Florida
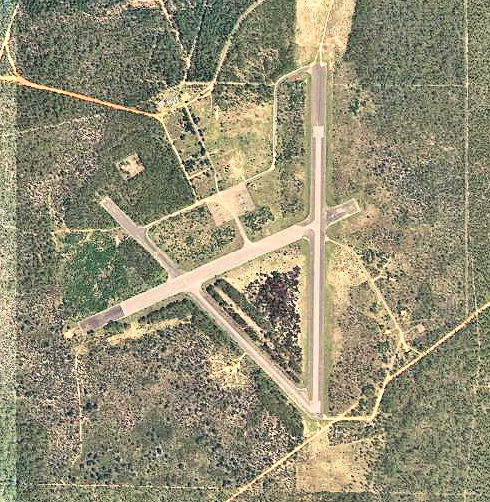
- 2006 USGS airphoto

Site information
- Controlled by: United States Air Force; Eglin Air Force Base

Location
- Coordinates: 30°32′02″N 086°48′22″W

Site history
- Built: 1941
- In use: 1942-Present
- Battles/wars: World War II

Epler Field, (Eglin Air Force Base Auxiliary Field #7), is a satellite airfield located west-northwest of the Main Base, 18.2 miles west of Valparaiso, Florida. It is designated Site B-12.

== Overview ==
Auxiliary Field 7 is named Epler Field for Col. Robin E. Epler, deputy commander (Technical) of the Air Proving Ground Command, Eglin Field, Florida, killed 28 January 1944 in the crash of A-20G-10-DO Havoc, 42-54016, one mile (1.6 km) NE of Crestview, Florida.

== History ==
The history of Epler Field is largely unknown, and the exact date of construction of Epler Field is undetermined. It was opened in 1942 and was constructed in a similar manner to a fully equipped base with three 4,000-foot runways, a large parking ramp, at least one hangar and numerous support buildings.

On 20 November 1951 The Army located its United States Army Ranger training camp at Epler Field to provide realistic jungle/swamp training. In January 1970, the camp moved to its present location at Biancur Field (Auxiliary Field #6).

The movement of the Ranger training camp was apparently the last active use of the field. All structures have been removed from the station area and the runways are shown as inactive. However, Epler is still an operating airfield that is used to support special operation activity within the Eglin complex. It is also known as Test Area B-12. Aerial imagery shows several F-4 Phantom II airframes on the parking ramp, along with an F-4 on the northwest runway end. There are also many stored shipping containers on the southwest runway end.

The airfield remains under the jurisdiction of the 96th Air Base Wing (96 ABW) as part of the active Eglin base and is not accessible to the public. A large tower, with a radome is visible at the north end of the former station area

== See also ==
- Florida World War II Army Airfields
