= Choctawhatchee National Forest =

National forest in Florida, United States

- Location within Florida Location within the United States
- Location: Florida, USA
- Nearest city: Tallahassee, FL
- Coordinates: 30.575°N 86.541667°W
- Area: 1,152 acres (466 ha)
- Created: November 27, 1908
- Governing body: U.S. Forest Service
- Website: www.fs.usda.gov/florida

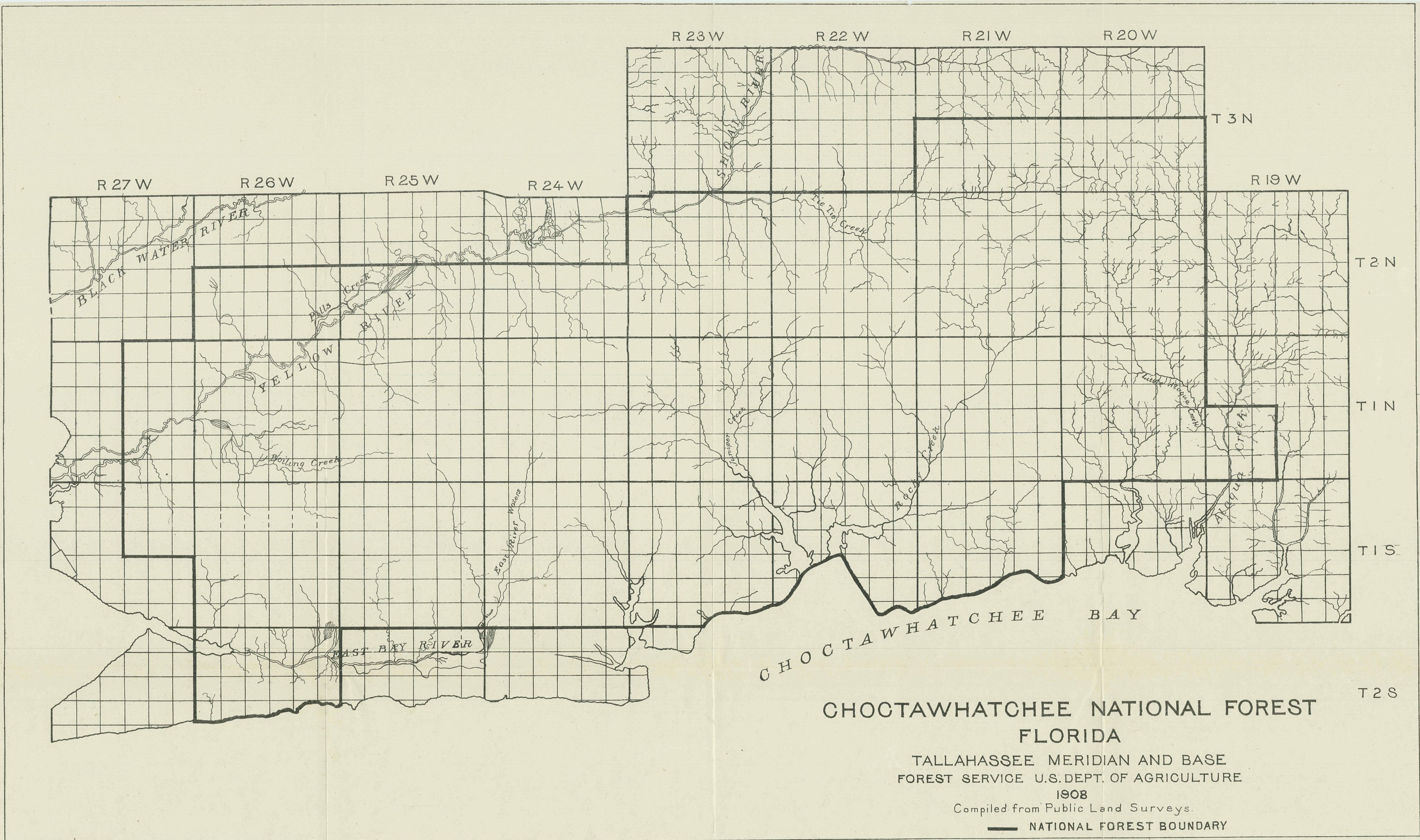
Choctawhatchee National Forest

Choctawhatchee National Forest is a United States National Forest established by President Theodore Roosevelt on November 27, 1908. The supervisory headquarters was established at DeFuniak Springs and moved to Pensacola in September 1910. It remained there until 1936 when it was relocated to Tallahassee. The Choctawhatchee's two districts (Easy Bay-Camp Pinchot and Niceville) were separated by what is now State Road 85.

National defense needs prompted Congress to transfer the national forest to the War Department just prior to World War II. On June 27, 1940, Congress transferred the 340,890 acres (1380 km^{2}) of the Choctawhatchee from the Forest Service to the War Department (and subsequently to its successor's constituent United States Department of the Air Force) for military purposes. The law provided that the land might be restored to national forest status by proclamation or order of the President when it was no longer needed for military purposes. It has been home to Eglin Air Force Base since. In descending order of amount of land area the forest is located in parts of southern Okaloosa, Walton, and Santa Rosa counties.

During the early years, Camp Pinchot was the Forest Supervisor's summer headquarters. At that time, the only mode of transportation from Pensacola (site of the main supervisory headquarters) was by boat. In 2000, Camp Pinchot celebrated its 50th anniversary as the residence for the Eglin Air Force Base Commander.

The current portion of the Choctawhatchee, that is still managed by the Forest Service, consists of several dispersed parcels that total only 1,110 acres (1.73 sq mi, or 4.492 km^{2}) and are managed by the Apalachicola National Forest. Some parcels lost many of their national forest characteristics by changing land-use over the years and others are difficult to manage because they are not contiguous. They may therefore be traded or sold to allow the Forest Service to acquire privately held land within the boundaries of other national forests in the state.

== See also ==
- List of national forests of the United States
- Apalachicola National Forest
- Camp Pinchot Historic District
- Eglin Air Force Base
- Ocala National Forest
- Osceola National Forest
