= Federal Prison Camp, Eglin =

Former federal prison camp in Eglin Air Force Base, Florida

Federal Prison Camp, Eglin was a Federal Bureau of Prisons minimum security prison at Auxiliary Field 6, Eglin Air Force Base in Florida.

Lacey Rose of Forbes wrote that it "was once considered so cushy that the term "Club Fed" was actually coined to describe it."

By 2006 the federal government decided to cut costs by closing Eglin and returning the buildings to the Air Force. The prisoners were moved to Federal Prison Camp, Pensacola.

== Notable inmates ==
The five Watergate burglars - Bernard Barker, Virgilio Gonzalez, Eugenio Martínez, James W. McCord Jr., and Frank Sturgis - were inmates at Eglin.

Inmate Name	Register Number	Photo	Status	Details
Jack P.F. Gremillion	N/A		Confined for two years after losing in 1973 his appeal of his 1971 conviction of lying to a grand jury about his involvement in the Louisiana Loan and Thrift case. He was subsequently readmitted to the bar.	Attorney General of Louisiana from 1956 to 1972
Edward Mezvinsky	55040-066		Released	Former member of the United States House of Representatives from Iowa
Louis Wolfson	N/A		Held at FCI, Eglin	Former Wall Street financier
Steve Madden	49498-054		Held at Eglin	Former head of Steve Madden, LTD
Robert C. Mason	81349-071		Imprisoned at Eglin in the early 1980s for drug trafficking. Wrote about these in the book Chickenhawk: Back in the World	Writer of Chickenhawk
Marvin Mandel	12100-037		Released	Former governor of Maryland
James A. Kelly Jr.	14231-038		Released	Former Massachusetts State Senator. Convicted of extortion.

- Paul Bilzerian (born 1950), financier convicted of securities fraud
