= McKinley Climatic Laboratory =

- U.S. National Register of Historic Places
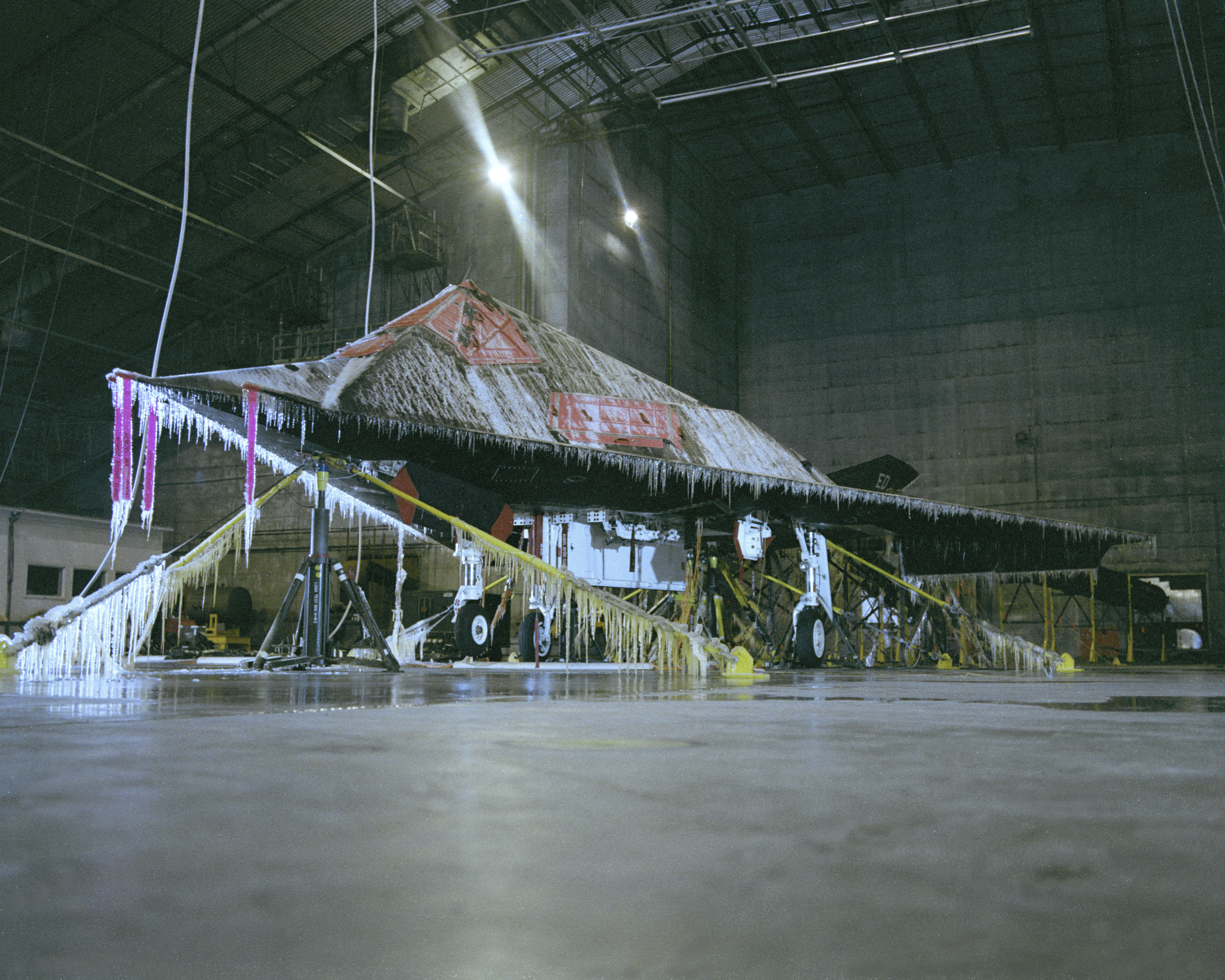
- F-117A, 84-0824, on ice at McKinley Climatic Laboratory in 1991

- Location within Florida Location within the United States
- Nearest city: Fort Walton Beach, Florida
- Coordinates: 30°28′33″N 86°30′27″W
- Built: 1944
- Architectural style: Late 19th And Early 20th Century American Movements
- NRHP reference No.: 97001145
- Added to NRHP: October 6, 1997

The McKinley Climatic Laboratory is both an active laboratory and a historic site located in Building 440 on Eglin Air Force Base, Florida. The laboratory is part of the 96th Test Wing. In addition to Air Force testing, it can be used by other US government agencies and private industry.

On October 6, 1997, it was added to the U.S. National Register of Historic Places. The laboratory was named a National Historic Mechanical Engineering Landmark by the American Society of Mechanical Engineers in 1987.

== History ==
In 1940, the US Army Air Force designated Ladd Field in Fairbanks, Alaska as a cold-weather testing facility. Because sufficiently cold weather was not predictable and often of short duration, Ashley McKinley suggested a refrigerated airplane hangar be built. The facilities were constructed at Eglin Field.

The first tests started in May 1947. Airplanes that were tested included the B-29 Superfortress, C-82 Packet, P-47 Thunderbolt, P-51 Mustang, P-80 Shooting Star, and the Sikorsky H-5D helicopter. More recently, it has tested the C-5 Galaxy, the F-117, the F-22, the Boeing 787, and the Airbus A350 XWB.

On 12 June 1971, the hangar was dedicated as the McKinley Climatic Hangar in honor of Col. Ashley McKinley, who suggested the facility and served at Eglin during its construction.

== Buildings ==
The Building 440 is an insulated, refrigerated hangar. There is an office and instrumentation building, a cold-weather engine test cell, the refrigeration system, mechanical-draft cooling towers, and a steam-heating plant.

The main chamber is 252 feet (77 m) wide, 201 feet (61 m) deep, and 70 feet (21 m) tall at the center of the hangar. It was constructed to hold aircraft as large as a B-29, its size also fitting the larger Convair B-36 Peacemaker. In 1968, a 60 feet (18 m) by 85 feet (26 m) extension was added. It now has 55,000 square feet (5,100 m^{2}) working area. This allows it to test aircraft as large as a C-5A. Under hot conditions, it can achieve 165 °F (74 °C).

The All-Weather Room is 42 feet (13 m) by 22 feet (7 m). It has a temperature range from −80 °F (−62 °C) to 170 °F (77 °C). Rainfall can be as high as 15 inches (380 mm) per hour and the wind can be as high as 60 knots (31 m/s). Snow can be made in the chamber.

The Temperature-Altitude Chamber is 13.5 feet (4.1 m) by 9.5 feet (2.9 m) with a height of 6.9 feet (2.1 m). Altitudes up to 80,000 feet (24 km) can be simulated. The temperature range is −80 °F (−62 °C) to 140 °F (60 °C).

The engine test cell was originally used for aircraft engines. It was about 130 feet (40 m) by 30 feet (9 m) with a height of 25 feet (8 m). It is now called the Equipment Test Chamber and is used mainly for tanks, trucks, and other equipment. The original building had small tests rooms for desert, hot, marine, and jungle conditions. These have been eliminated.

The original floor of the building was constructed of reinforced-concrete slabs that were 12 inches (30 cm) thick and 12.5 feet (3.8 m) square. The slabs rested on 13 inches (33 cm) of cellular glass blocks over reinforced concrete. In 1990, much of this floor was replaced with 25 feet (7.6 m) square slabs. The walls and door are insulated with 13 inches (33 cm) of glass-wool board sheathed in galvanized steel. To seal the doors, they are pulled against foam rubber seals. The ceiling insulation is on a corrugated steel deck, which is suspended from the roof trusses by chains.

== Refrigeration system ==
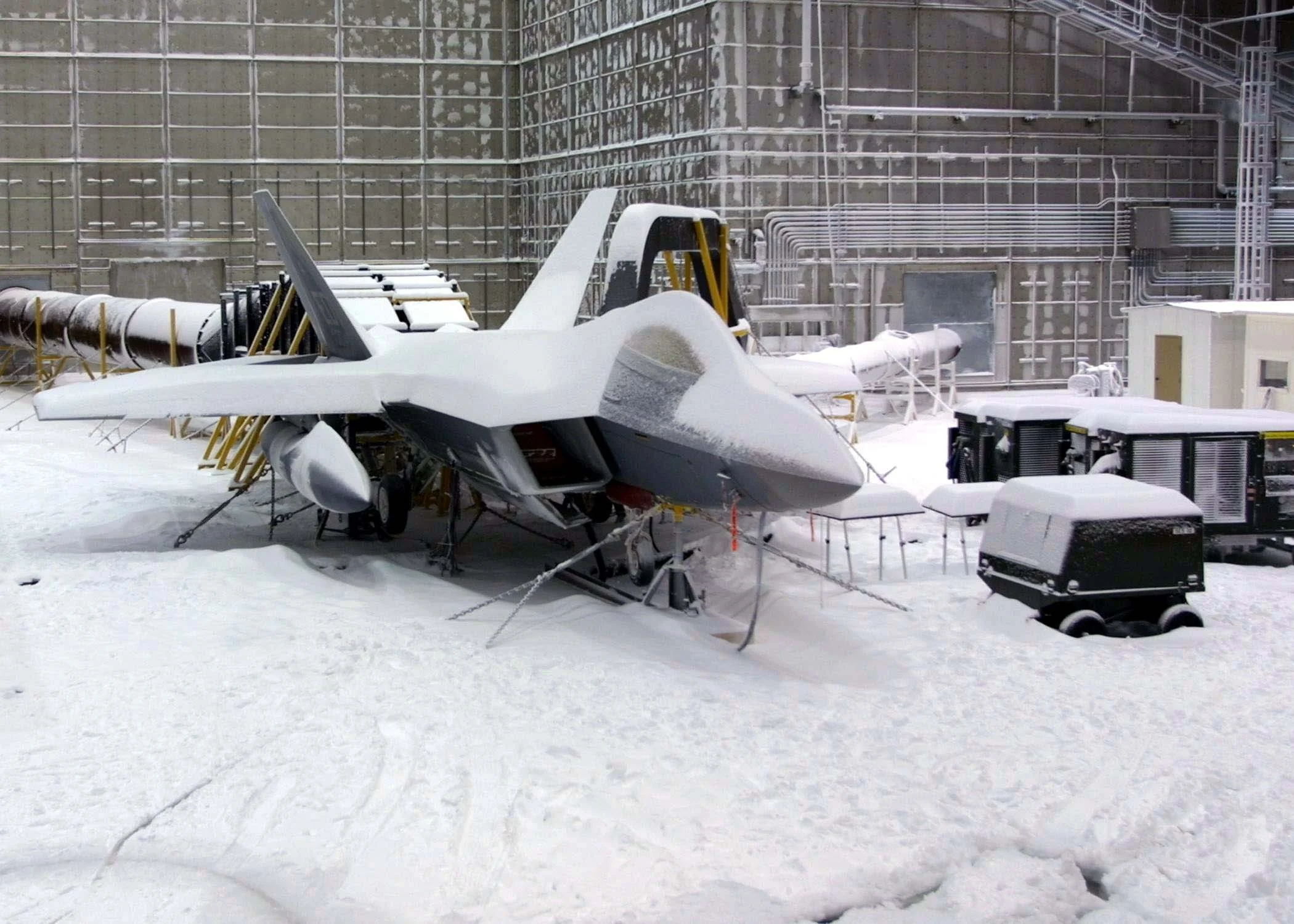
F-22A, 91-4004, at McKinley Climatic Laboratory, 2002

The original coolant was R-12 refrigerant. Liquid refrigerant is held in a low-pressure surge tank. The pressure in this tank is maintained at the saturation pressure for the desired temperature for the cooling coils. Vapor from this tank is compressed to a gage pressure of 20 psi (138 kPa) by the first-stage compressor. The compressed vapor is expanded into an intermediate, desuperheater tank. Liquid condensed in this expansion is drained back to the surge tank. The remaining vapor is compressed in a high-stage compressor to a gage pressure of about 150 psi (1 MPa). Heat is transferred from the hot vapor to cooling water. Any condensed liquid is returned to the intermediate tank, the surge tank, or the supply tank. Liquid refrigerant from the surge tank is pumped through the cooling coils at sufficient pressure to avoid vaporization. Warmed liquid is returned to the surge tank. As its pressure is reduced, a portion of this liquid will flash into vapor.

There are three such refrigeration systems. Each low-stage compressor is powered by a 1,000 horsepower (746 kW) motor and each high-stage compressor is powered by a 1,250 horsepower (932 kW) motor. The system was built by York Corporation. The original motors were Allis-Chalmers induction motors. They have been replaced by variable frequency, synchronous motors manufactured by EMICC that operate between 350 and 1800 rpm. Recent efforts have been made to change from ozone-depleting refrigerants.

For engine tests, there is need for makeup air. The system originally could cool 200 pounds (91 kg) per second of humid air. In 1966, this was increased to 450 pounds (204 kg) per second. Air is also cooled by a two-stage heat exchanger. The first stage uses 110,000 US gallons (416 m^{3}) of 20% calcium chloride brine pre-cooled to 24 °F (−4 °C). The second stage uses 137,500 US gallons (520 m^{3}) of methylene chloride pre-cooled to −97 °F (−72 °C). This can cool 450 pounds (204 kg) per second of humid air from 80 °F (27 °C) to −65 °F (−54 °C) for 40 minutes.
