= Gulfview Hotel Historic District =

Historic district in Florida, United States

- U.S. National Register of Historic Places
- U.S. Historic district
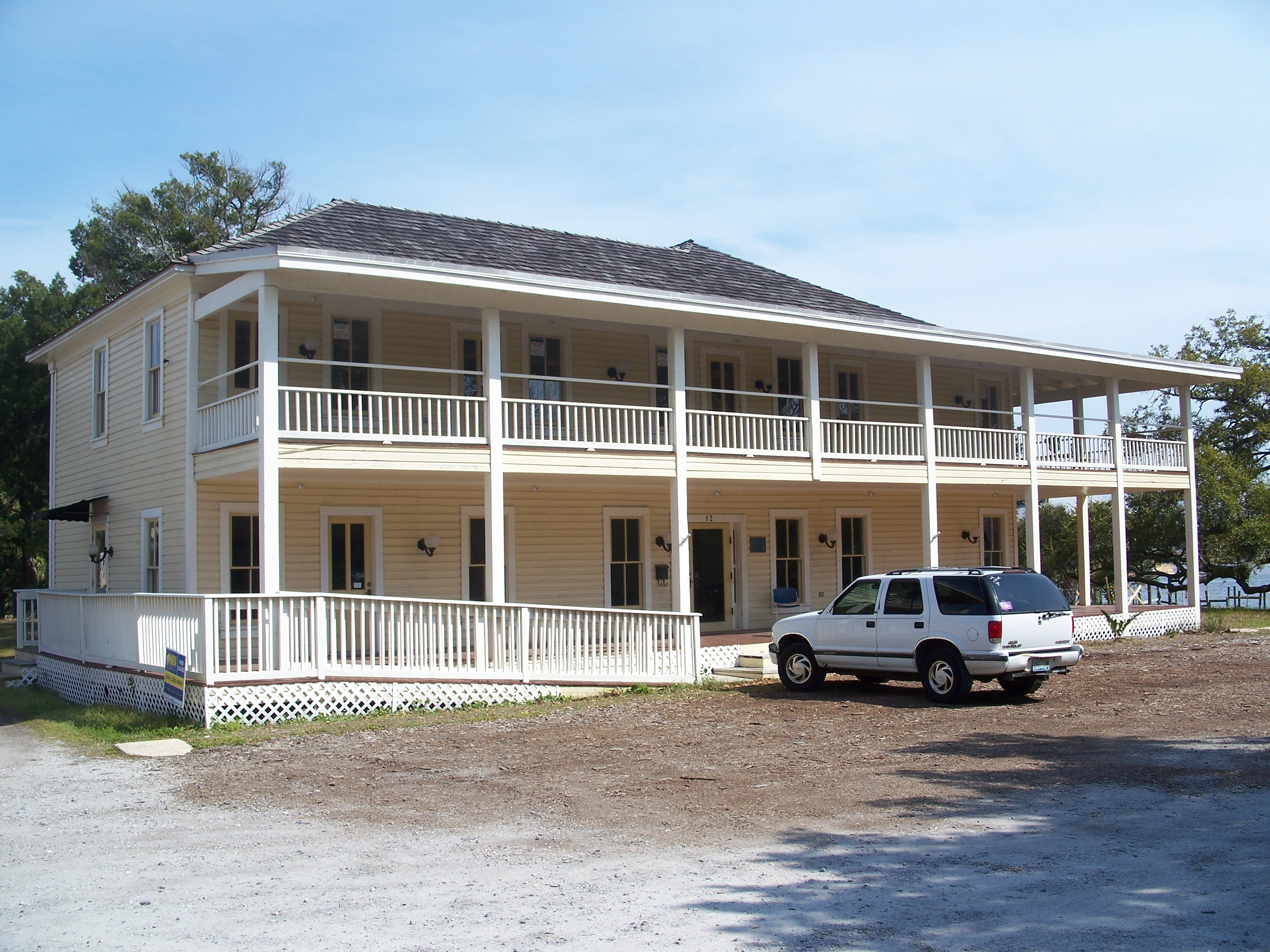

- Location within Florida Location within the United States
- Location: 12 Miracle Strip Parkway, SE., Fort Walton Beach, Florida
- Coordinates: 30°24′14″N 86°36′30″W
- Area: 2 acres (0.81 ha)
- Built: 1906
- Architect: Goodrich, E.B.
- NRHP reference No.: 92001402
- Added to NRHP: October 22, 1992

The Gulfview Hotel Historic District (also known simply as the Gulfview Hotel) is a U.S. historic district (designated as such on October 22, 1992) located in Fort Walton Beach, Florida. The district is at 12 Miracle Strip Parkway, Southeast. It contains 14 historic buildings.

In 2018, the main hotel building was relocated to 115 Miracle Strip Parkway S.E. The following year, it was opened for multiple usage including a welcome center.
