= Eglin Field Historic District =

Historic district in Florida, United States

- U.S. National Register of Historic Places
- U.S. Historic district
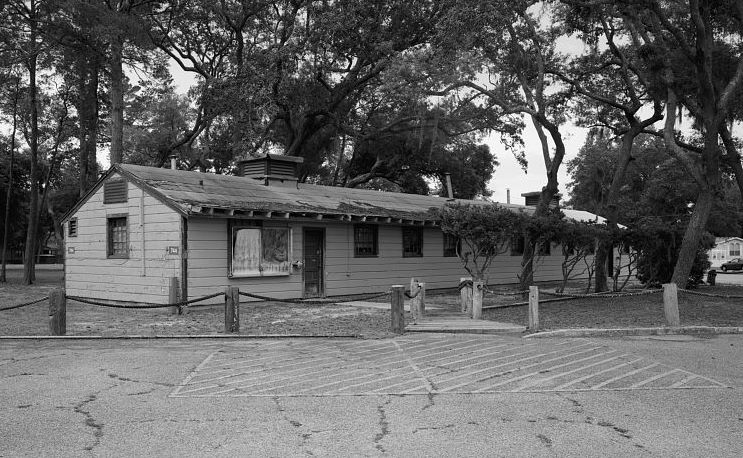

- Location within Florida Location within the United States
- Location: Fort Walton Beach, Florida
- Coordinates: 30°28′58″N 86°29′30″W
- Area: 160 acres (0.65 km^{2})
- NRHP reference No.: 98001254
- Added to NRHP: 22 October 1998

The Eglin Field Historic District is a U.S. historic district (designated as such on 22 October 1998) located near Fort Walton Beach, Florida. The district is on Eglin Air Force Base, and is bounded by Barranca, Choctawhatchee, 4th, and "F" Avenues. It contains 20 historic buildings.
