= Camp Pinchot Historic District =

Historic district in Florida, United States

- U.S. National Register of Historic Places
- U.S. Historic district
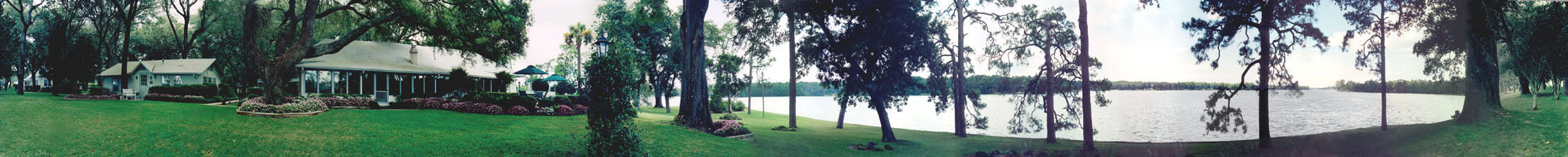

- Location within Florida Location within the United States
- Location: Eglin Air Force Base, Florida
- Coordinates: 30°28′13″N 86°35′38″W
- Area: 180 acres (0.73 km^{2})
- NRHP reference No.: 98001255
- Added to NRHP: 22 October 1998

The Camp Pinchot Historic District is a U.S. historic district (designated as such on 22 October 1998), located approximately 0.5 miles (0.80 km) north of Fort Walton Beach, Florida. The district is on Eglin Air Force Base, roughly along the west bank of Garnier's Bayou. It contains 10 historic buildings.

== See also ==
- Choctawhatchee National Forest
