= Camp Rudder =

U.S. Army Ranger School training phase

Coordinates: 30.626686°N 86.745343°W

Camp James E. Rudder (Camp Rudder) is host to the third and final phase of a nine-week training course, dubbed the "swamp phase", of the U.S. Army Ranger School. The camp is located on the Eglin Air Force Base reservation, co-located with Eglin AFB Auxiliary Field #6 / Biancur Field, approximately fourteen miles northwest of the main Eglin AFB airfield.

The Florida Ranger Camp was established November 15, 1951, by then Major Arthur "Bull" Simons who was named the Commander of the Amphibious/Jungle Training Committee at Eglin AFB Auxiliary Field #7 / Epler Field, which was the initial location of the camp. Colonel Simons was later the commander of the prisoner of war rescue attempt on Son Tay, North Vietnam. The Florida Ranger Camp remained at Field Seven for 20 years until it was moved to Field Six in January 1970.

The current Camp Rudder was named for Major General James E. Rudder, USA in June 1974. MG Rudder commanded the 2nd Ranger Battalion when it scaled the cliffs at Pointe du Hoc, France, during the 1944 D-Day Normandy invasion.

== History ==
Biancur Field, Eglin Auxiliary Field #6, was named for 1st Lieutenant Andrew Biancur, USAAF, a test pilot of the Medium Bombardment Section of the 1st Proving Ground Group, killed in crash of a prototype YP-61-NO Black Widow, AAF Ser. No. 41-18883, c/n 711, on 8 January 1944 at Eglin Field.

Biancur Field, as Eglin AFB Aux Field #6, remains the airfield portion of Camp Rudder and was previously used by the U.S. Navy's Training Squadron 4 (TRARON 4 or VT-4) at nearby Naval Air Station Pensacola in the early 1960s for strike pilot training. The squadron aircraft were T2J Buckeyes and Biancur was used for Field Carrier Landing Practice (FCLP) touch-and-go landings before student pilots were allowed to land on board the training carrier of the period, the USS Antietam (CV-36). Meals for the sailors on TAD (Temporary Assigned Duty) at Biancur were supplied by the U.S. Army Rangers at Field 7. With the advent of the more advanced T-2C Buckeye and TA-4J Skyhawk II and the retirement of Antietam to be replaced by the aircraft carrier USS Lexington (CVT-16 / AVT-16), VT-4 shifted FCLP operations to Naval Outlying Landing Field Choctaw (NOLF Choctaw), a Navy airfield formerly known as Eglin AFB Auxiliary Field #10, to the west of Camp Rudder. With the Navy's departure, all Biancur Field operations passed over to the Army.

Over the years, twenty-four Army Ranger students have died while in training at Camp Rudder, including four who died in a 1955 training accident, two Ranger students who died of hypothermia in January 1977, and another four who died of exposure during cold-weather flooding in February 1995. The 1995 accident was blamed on several factors, including a sudden rise in the water level on Boiling Creek coupled with other unexpected weather changes, such as fog that delayed rescue efforts. Since 1995, more sophisticated measures have been put into place that cast an elaborate, yet invisible, safety net around the students. As students plan ambushes and negotiate swamps, field ambulances are posted minutes away. Evacuation helicopters and rescue boats are on standby and are constantly advised of changing conditions. Before students enter the water, divers check out conditions. An elaborate system to monitor weather and water conditions and depths exists at every step in the exercise.

Training remains tough for the men and women who aspire to be the Army's most elite warriors. The Army has also placed more emphasis on protecting Rangers during training. Camp officials say that with lessons learned from a training accident in 1995, and more resources thanks to allocations from the U.S. Congress, the danger of training casualties has been greatly reduced.
