= Eglin Air Force Base =

US Air Force base in Florida, US

- Near Valparaiso, Florida, in the United States
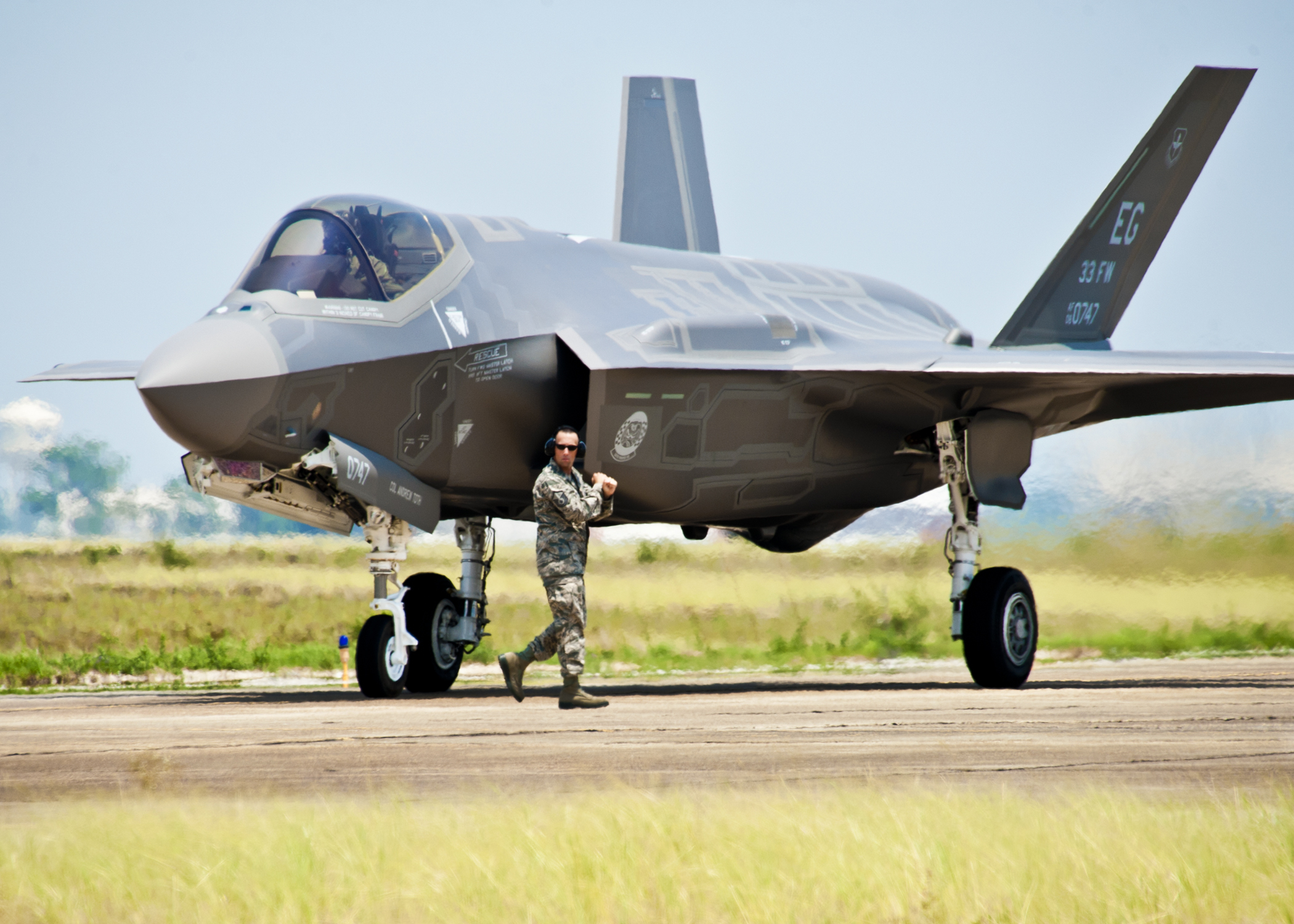
- An F-35A Lightning of the 33rd Fighter Wing based at Eglin AFB

Site information
- Type: US Air Force Base
- Owner: Department of Defense
- Operator: US Air Force
- Controlled by: Air Force Materiel Command (AFMC)
- Condition: Operational
- Website: eglin.af.mil

Location
- Location within North America Location within the United States Location within Florida Location within North Atlantic Location within Gulf of Mexico
- Coordinates: 30°29′22″N 86°32′32″W

Site history
- Built: 1935 (as the Valparaiso Bombing and Gunnery Base)
- In use: 1935–present

Garrison information
- Garrison: 96th Test Wing; 6th Ranger Training Battalion; 7th Special Forces Group (United States)

Airfield information
- Identifiers: IATA: VPS, ICAO: KVPS, FAA LID: VPS, WMO: 722210
- Elevation: 25.6 metres (84 ft) AMSL
Runways
Direction	Length and surface
12/30	3,658.8 metres (12,004 ft) Asphalt/Concrete
01/19	3,051.7 metres (10,012 ft) Asphalt
- Airfield shared with Destin–Fort Walton Beach Airport; Source: Federal Aviation Administration

Eglin Air Force Base (IATA: VPS, ICAO: KVPS, FAA LID: VPS) is a United States Air Force (USAF) base in the western Florida panhandle, located about three miles (5 km) southwest of Valparaiso in Okaloosa County.

The host unit at Eglin is the 96th Test Wing (formerly the 96th Air Base Wing). The 96 TW is the test and evaluation center for Air Force air-delivered weapons, navigation and guidance systems, command and control systems, and Air Force Special Operations Command (AFSOC) systems.

Eglin AFB was established 91 years ago in 1935 as the Valparaiso Bombing and Gunnery Base. It is named in honor of Lt. Col. Frederick I. Eglin (1891–1937), who was killed in a crash of his Northrop A-17 attack aircraft on a flight from Langley to Maxwell Field, Alabama.

== History ==
=== Creation and World War II ===
In 1931, personnel of the Air Corps Tactical School, newly relocated to Maxwell Field, Alabama, sought a location for a bombing and gunnery range. They saw the potential of the sparsely populated forested areas surrounding Valparaiso and the vast expanse of the adjacent Gulf of Mexico.

Eglin Air Force Base evolved from the 1933 creation of the Valparaiso Airport, when an arrowhead-shaped parcel of 137 acres (55 ha) was cleared for use as an airdrome. Much of the base was part of a national forest until the 1939 outbreak of World War II in Europe when a proving ground for aircraft armament was established. The U.S. Forest Service ceded over 340,000 acres (1,400 km^{2}) of the Choctawhatchee National Forest to the War Department on 18 October 1940.

From October 1941 to October 1945, a USAAF Fixed Gunnery School operated at the base, supervised by the 75th Flying Training Wing.

The Eglin Air Force Base was where the Doolitle Raiders were trained for their 1942 launch on Tokyo. Charles Sweeney served as a test pilot here from 1943-1944, before he flew the mission on August 9, 1945 which dropped fat man, the atomic bomb over Nagasaki.

At its peak during World War II, the base employed more than 1,000 officers, 10,000 enlisted personnel and 4,000 civilians.

=== Postwar ===
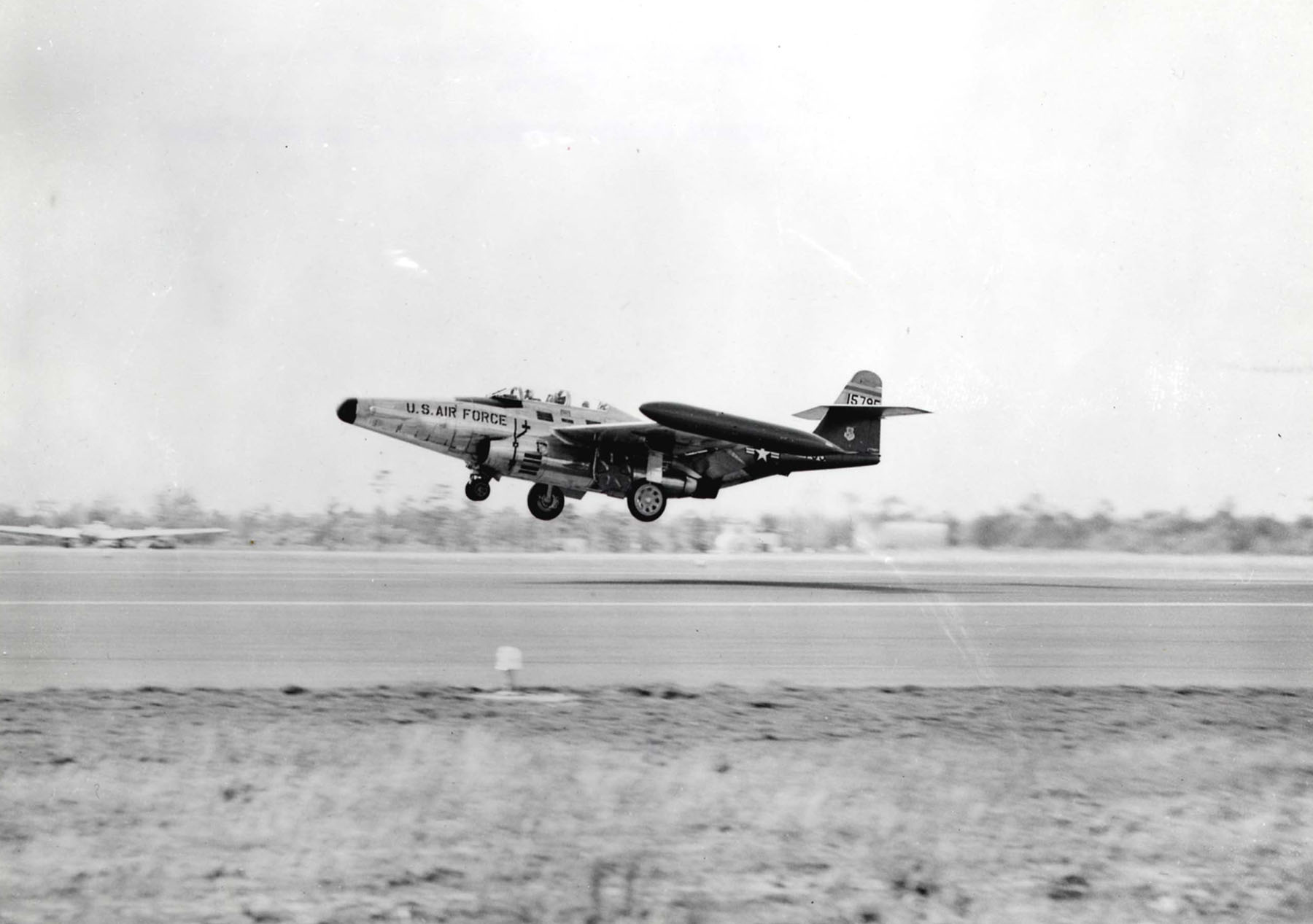
A Northrop F-89C landing at Eglin Air Force Base in the 1950s

After the war, Eglin became a pioneer in developing the techniques for missile launching and handling; and the development of drone or pilotless aircraft beginning with the Republic-Ford JB-2 Loon, an American copy of the V-1. The 1st Experimental Guided Missiles Group was activated at Eglin Field, Florida, on 6 February 1946, operating out of Auxiliary Field 3. By March 1950, the 550th Guided Missiles Wing, comprising the 1st and 2nd Guided Missile Squadrons, had replaced the 1st Experimental Guided Missiles Group. The 2nd Guided Missile Squadron, SSM, had 62 pilots manning 14 B-17s, three B-29s, and four F-80 Shooting Stars, yellow-tailed drone aircraft used in the role of testing guided missiles.

In December 1955, the Air Munitions Development Laboratory was reassigned from the Wright Air Development Center at Wright-Patterson AFB, Ohio, to the Air Force Armament Center at Eglin by Headquarters Air Research and Development Command. The responsibility for development of guns, bombs, rockets, fuses, guided missile warheads and other related equipment in the armament field was transferred from the Dayton, Ohio facility at this time. Work on nuclear weapons was not included in this mission.

=== 1960s ===
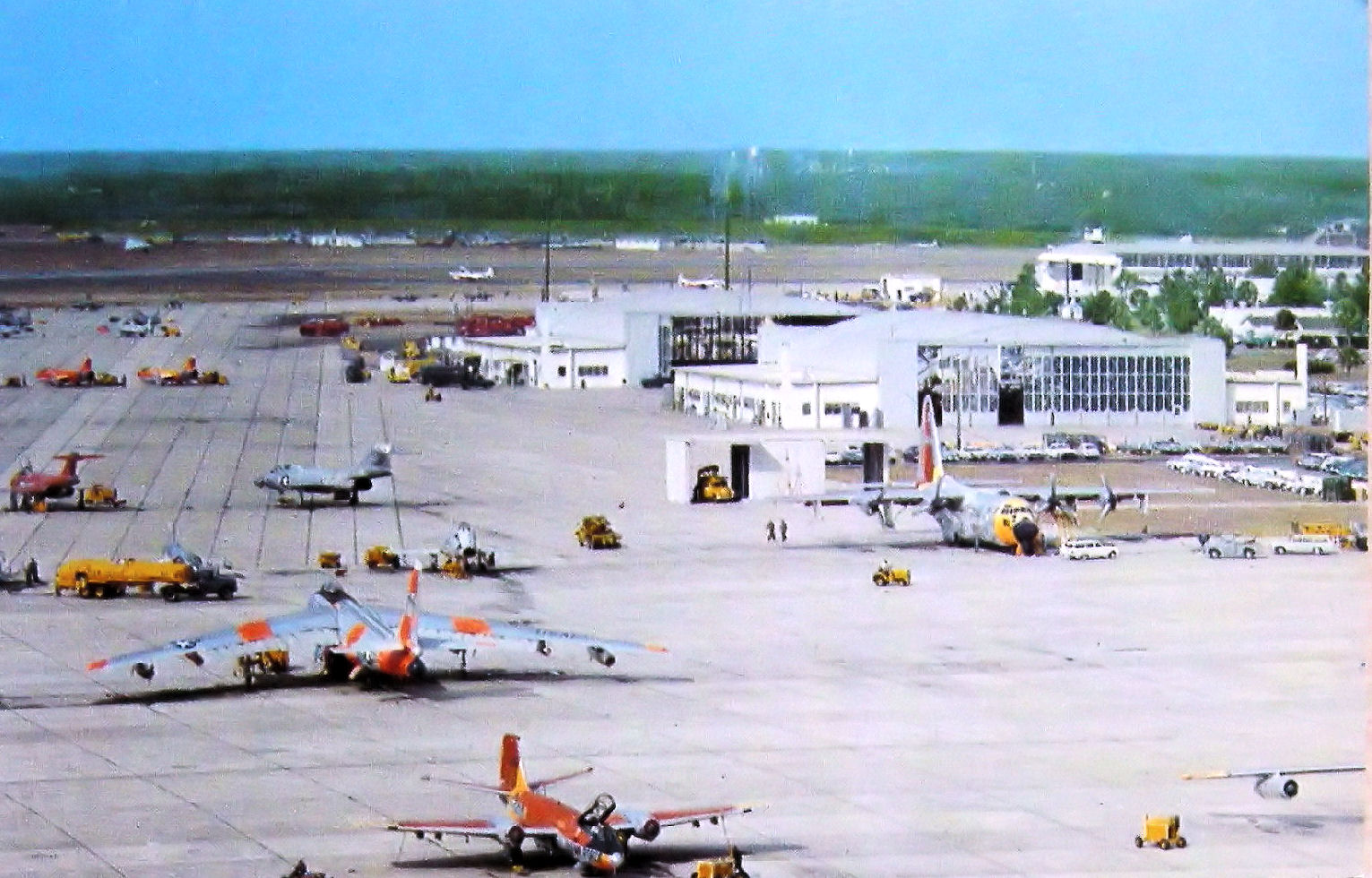
Eglin AFB aircraft parking apron in 1964

The USAF Special Air Warfare Center was activated 27 April 1962, with the 1st Combat Applications Group (CAG) organized as a combat systems development and test agency under the SAWC. The 1st CAG concentrated on testing and evaluation of primarily short-term projects which might improve Air Force counter-insurgency (COIN) operations. The Special Air Warfare Center, located at Hurlburt Field, undertook to develop tactical air doctrine while training crews for special air warfare in places like Southeast Asia. By mid-1963, SAW groups were in Vietnam and Panama.

The USAF Tactical Air Warfare Center was activated on 1 November 1963. It would be re-designated as the USAF Air Warfare Center on 1 October 1991.

With the increasing U.S. involvement in Southeast Asia in the 1960s, the need for increased emphasis on conventional weapons development made Eglin's mission even more important. On 1 August 1968, the Air Proving Ground Center was redesignated the Armament Development and Test Center to centralize responsibility for research, development, test and evaluation, and initial acquisition of non-nuclear munitions for the Air Force. On 1 October 1979, the center was given division status. The Armament Division, redesignated Munitions Systems Division on 15 March 1989, placed into production the precision-guided munitions for the laser, television, and infrared guided bombs; two anti-armor weapon systems; and an improved hard target weapon, the GBU-28, used in Operation Desert Storm during the Persian Gulf War. The Division was also responsible for developing the Advanced Medium Range Air-to-Air Missile (AMRAAM), an Air Force-led joint project with the U.S. Navy.

=== Late Cold War era ===
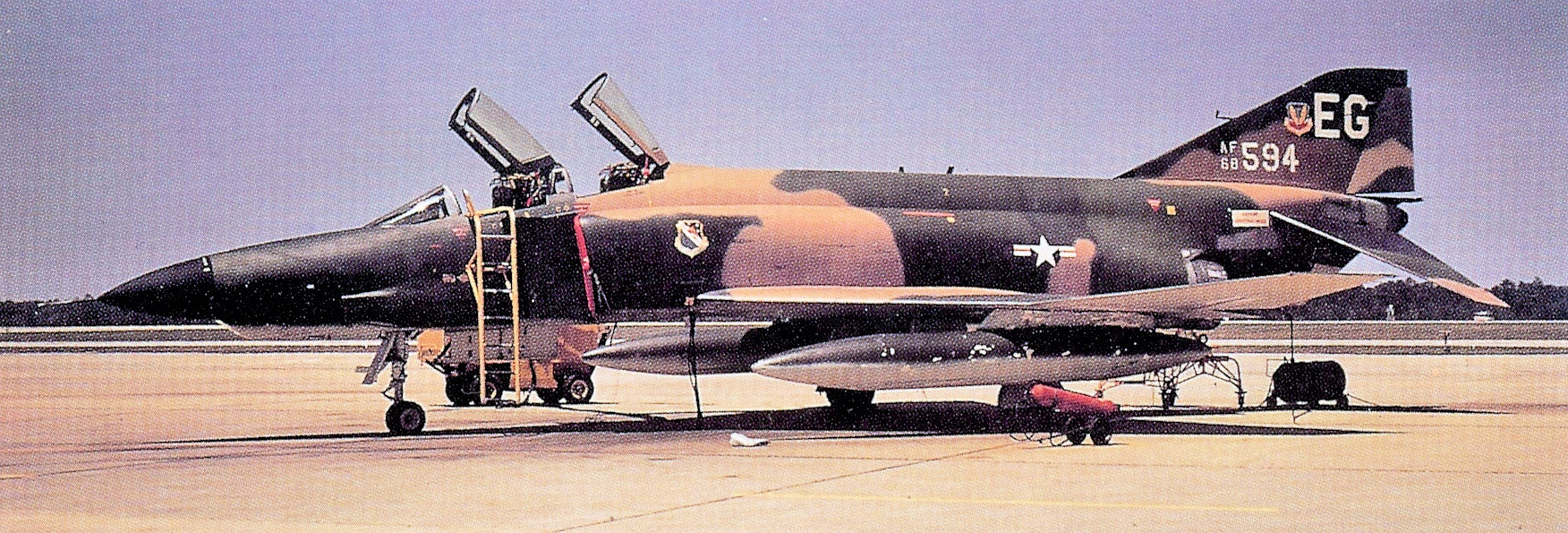
A McDonnell Douglas RF-4C Phantom of the Eglin AFB based 3247th Test Squadron, seen in 1971

The Air Force Armament Museum was founded on base in 1975. In 1981 the original building housing the museum was condemned and the facility closed until 1984.

Selected on 27 April 1975, the installation served as one of four main U.S. Vietnamese Refugee Processing Centers operated by the Interagency Task Force for Indochina Refugees, where base personnel housed and processed more than 10,000 Southeast Asian refugees, the first 374 of which arrived on board a Northwest Orient Boeing 747 on 4 May 1975.

In 1978, the USAF Tactical Air Warfare Center assumed responsibility for the USAF Air Ground Operations School. In the same year, the Electronic Warfare Evaluation Program became another one of the USAFTAWC's weapons system evaluation programs, and resulted in the activation of the 4487th Electronic Warfare Aggressor Squadron in 1990.

Construction began in 1984 on the Bob Hope Village, the only retirement facility that caters to enlisted military, opening in February 1985. Residents pay below market value for the 256 independent apartments. Col. Bob Gates, Bob Hope's USO pilot, was key in getting the comedian's support for the undertaking, as well as lending his name to the project. He was named an honorary board member of the foundation in 1978 and held benefit concerts for nearly two decades.

=== Post-Cold War ===
During a 1992 reorganization, the Air Force disestablished Eglin's parent major command, Air Force Systems Command (AFSC) and merged its functions with the former Air Force Logistics Command (AFLC). The newly created major command from this merger, Air Force Materiel Command (AFMC), remains Eglin's parent command to this day. The Development Test Center, Eglin's host unit, became part of AFMC on 30 June 1992. The 46th Test Wing replaced the 3246th Test Wing in October 1992.

On 10 August 1994 construction began on the All Conflicts' Veterans War Memorial on the site of the old POW/MIA memorial on the western end of Eglin Boulevard. The memorial was dedicated on 15 August 1995.

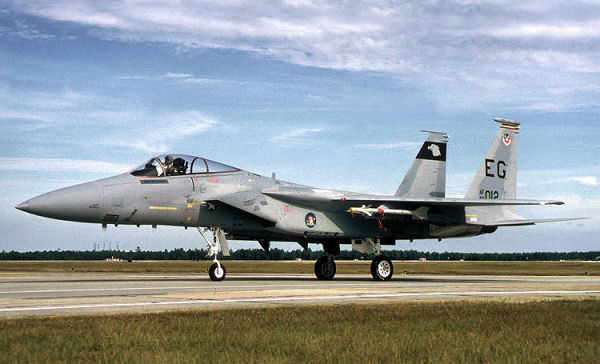
F-15C of the 33d Fighter Wing

As part of the military drawdown in the 1990s, the Air Force inactivated the 33d Fighter Wing's 59th Fighter Squadron on 15 April 1999. The wing lost six aircraft and consolidated the remaining aircraft into the 58th and 60th Fighter Squadrons. Originally selected for inactivation in 1997, Air Force officials delayed the decision in recognition of the Nomads' connection with Khobar Towers. The 59th reactivated as the 59th Test and Evaluation Squadron on 3 December 2004, at Nellis Air Force Base, Nevada. The 59th falls under the 53rd Test Management Group at Eglin.

In July 2012 the Air Armament Center was inactivated. The center had planned, directed and conducted test and evaluation of U.S. and allied air armament, navigation and guidance systems, and command and controlled systems. It operated two Air Force installations, providing host support not only to Eglin AFB, but also Kirtland AFB, New Mexico. It had included the Armament Product Directorate (Eglin), the 46th Test Wing (Eglin), the 96th Air Base Wing (Eglin), and the 377th Air Base Wing (Kirtland).

The US Navy's VFA-101 "Grim Reapers" deactivated on 23 May 2019 after seven years of F-35C training at Eglin.

=== Base railroad ===
Initial construction of a railroad line into the region had been discussed as early as 1927 as part of the Choctawhatchee and Northern Railroad, though military-use proposals didn't come forward until 1941. German POWs were used in clearing and grading the alignment during World War II. There was one commercial customer served by the line, a lumber pulp yard at Niceville which is now community athletic fields. The line was later abandoned in the late 1970s and the southern end, west of State Road 285, lifted by the mid-1980s.

== Role and operations ==
Eglin is an Air Force Materiel Command (AFMC) base serving as the focal point for all Air Force armaments. Eglin is responsible for the development, acquisition, testing, deployment and sustainment of all air-delivered non-nuclear weapons.

The base plans, directs, and conducts test and evaluation of U.S. and allied air armament, navigation and guidance systems, and command and control systems.

Severe-weather testing of aircraft and other equipment is carried out here at the McKinley Climatic Laboratory.

The residential portion of the base is a census-designated place; its population was 8,082 at the 2000 census. Eglin Air Force Base had 2,359 military family housing units. Unmarried junior enlisted members generally live in one of Eglin's seven dormitories located near the dining hall, chapel, base gym, enlisted club, and bus lines on base. Each individual unit generally handles dormitory assignments. Bachelor Officer Quarters are not available. Several units and one dormitory were being renovated in 2011. The base covers 463,128 acres (1,874.2 km^{2} / 723.6 sqm).

=== Major units ===
==== 96th Test Wing (96 TW) ====
The 96 TW is the test and evaluation wing for Air Force air-delivered weapons, navigation and guidance systems, command and control (C2) systems, and Air Force Special Operations Command systems. The Eglin Gulf Test Range provides approximately 340,000 square kilometres (130,000 sq mi) of over water airspace. The 96 TW supports other tenant units on the installation with traditional military services as well as all the services of a small city, to include civil engineering, personnel, logistics, communications, computer, medical, security. The 96 TW reports to the Air Force Test Center at Edwards AFB.

==== 33d Fighter Wing (33 FW) ====
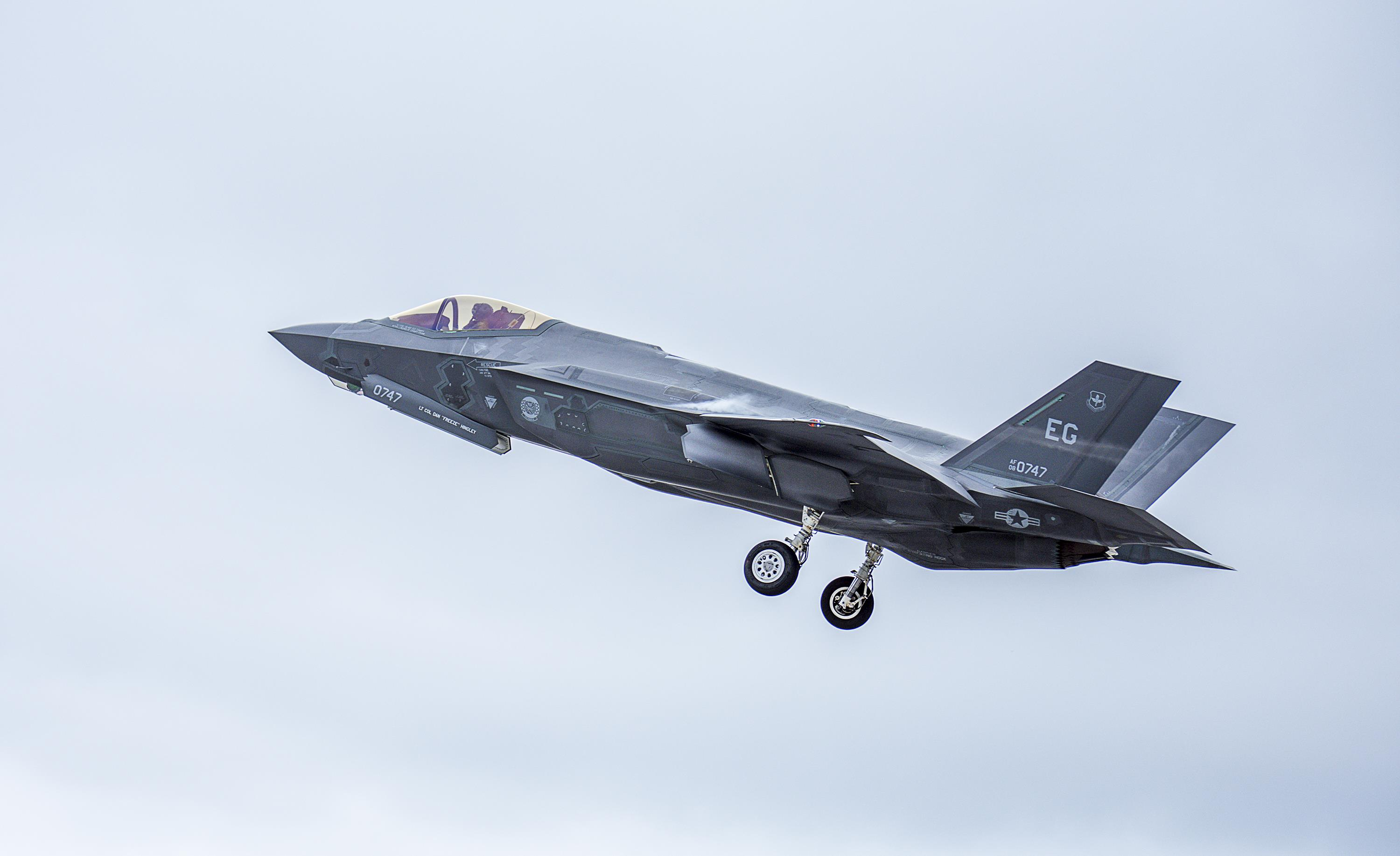
A F-35A Lightning II of the 33rd Fighter Wing takes off to conduct sorties at Eglin Air Force Base in 2017.

The 33d FW "Nomads" is the largest tenant unit at Eglin. The 33 FW is a flying and maintenance training wing for the F-35 Lightning II, organized under Air Combat Command's Fifteenth Air Force. First established as the 33d Pursuit Group, the wing's contribution to tactical airpower during its 50-year history has been significant with participation in campaigns around the world, while flying various fighter aircraft. Reactivated at Eglin on 1 April 1965 with F-4C Phantom IIs, the wing operated, successively, F-4D and E models into the 1970s before transitioning to the F-15 Eagle. As of 1 October 2009, the 33d FW transitioned to a training wing for the new F-35. The final F-15s assigned to the 33d departed the base in September 2009. Initially a joint wing, until 2014, the Wing was responsible for F-35 pilot and maintainer training for the Air Force, Marine Corps and the Navy. The first of 59 F-35s arrived from Lockheed Martin Fort Worth, Texas on 14 July 2011. The Marines left in 2014, and the Navy followed in 2019, with the 33 FW continuing training USAF F-35A pilots. On 10 July 2026, after a 17 year tenure in AETC, the 33rd Fighter Wing returned to Air Combat Command.

===== 58th Fighter Squadron =====
The 58th FS "Mighty Gorillas" are authorized to operate 24 assigned F-35A aircraft, planning and executing a training curriculum in support of USAF and international partner pilot training requirements. The F-35A is a conventional take-off and landing, low-observable, multi-role fighter aircraft, designed with 5th-generation sensors and weapons, and is able to perform air superiority, air interdiction and close air support missions. The F-35A made its first flight on 15 December 2006.

==== 53d Wing (53 WG) ====
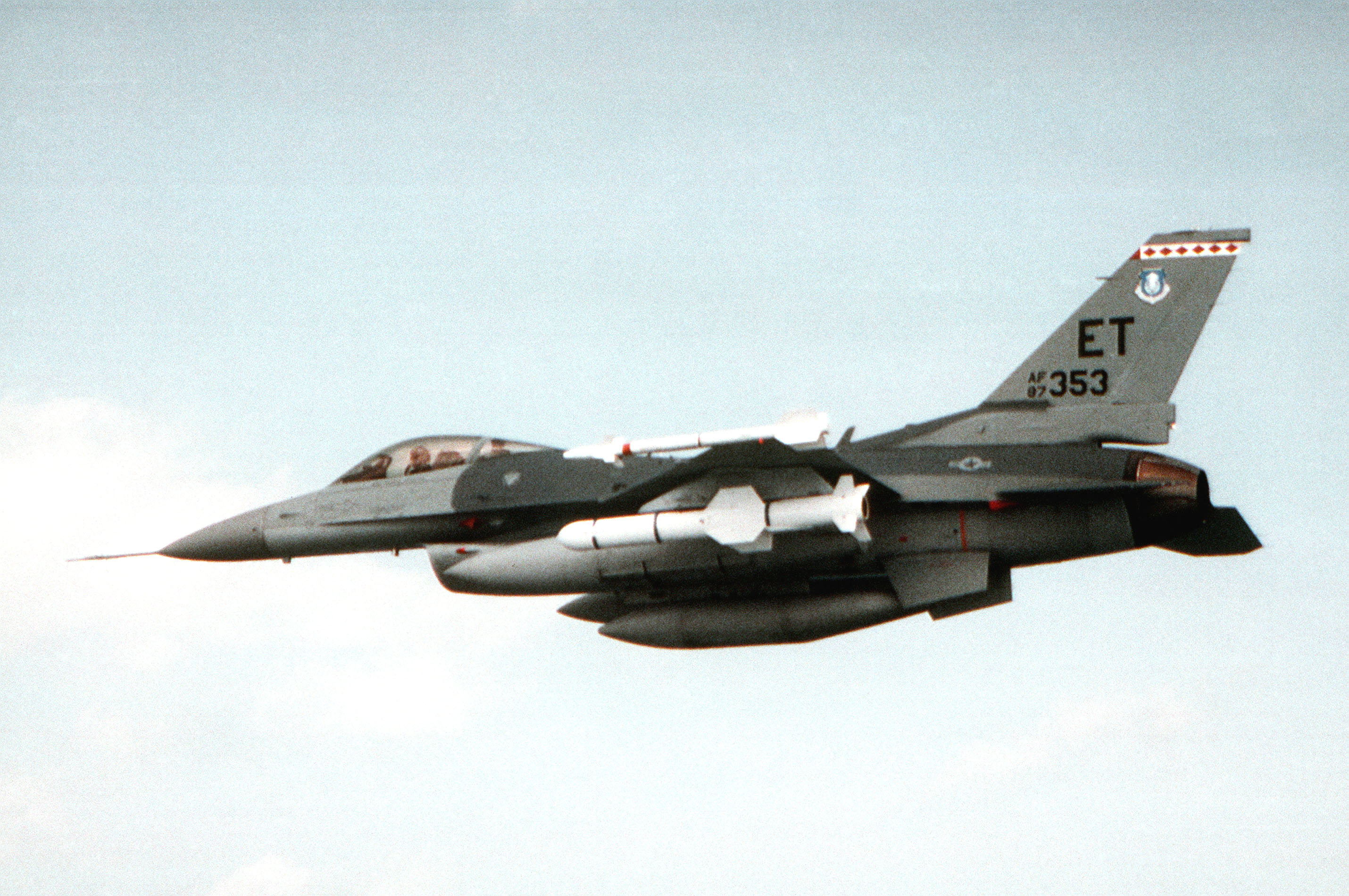
May 1992 air-to-air view of an F-16 Fighting Falcon equipped with an AGM-84 Harpoon all-weather anti-ship missile over Eglin Air Force Base. Note Air Force Systems Command badge on vertical fin.

The 53 WG is headquartered at Eglin and serves as the USAF's focal point for operational test and evaluation of armament and avionics, aircrew training devices, chemical defense, aerial reconnaissance improvements, electronic warfare systems, and is responsible for the QF-4 Phantom II Full Scale Aerial Target (FSAT) program and subscale drone programs (located at Tyndall AFB, Florida). The wing tests every fighter, bomber, unmanned aerial vehicle, and associated weapon system in the Air Force inventory. The wing reports to the United States Air Force Warfare Center at Nellis Air Force Base, Nevada, a Direct Reporting Unit (DRU) to Headquarters, Air Combat Command (ACC).

===== 49th Test and Evaluation Squadron (49 TES) =====
The 49 TES is attached to the 53d Wing but located at Barksdale Air Force Base, Louisiana. The squadron plans, executes and reports ACC's weapon system evaluation programs for bombers (B-52, B-1 and B-2) and nuclear-capable fighters (F-15E Strike Eagle and F-16). These evaluations include operational effectiveness and suitability, command and control, performance of aircraft hardware and software systems, employment tactics, and accuracy and reliability of associated precision weapons. These weapons include air-launched cruise missiles, standoff missiles, and gravity bombs. Results and conclusions support acquisition decisions and development of war plans. The unit also performs operational testing on new systems and tactics development for the B-52.

==== Armament Directorate ====
The Armament Directorate located at Eglin is responsible for management of air and ground dominance weapon system programs. Led by the Air Force Program Executive Officer for Weapons, the directorate concurrently reports to the Secretary of the Air Force for Acquisition, Washington, D.C., and the Air Force Life Cycle Management Center, Wright-Patterson Air Force Base, Ohio.

==== Air Force Research Laboratory Munitions Directorate (AFRL/RW) ====
AFRL/RW develops, demonstrates, and transitions science and technology for air-launched munitions for defeating ground fixed, mobile/relocatable, air and space targets to assure pre-eminence of U.S. air and space forces. The directorate conducts basic research, exploratory development, and advanced development and demonstrations. It also participates in programs focused on technology transfer, dual-use technology and small business development.

==== 7th Special Forces Group (7th SFG) ====
In 2011, the United States Army's 7th Special Forces Group relocated to a newly constructed cantonment on the Eglin Air Force Base reservation from Fort Bragg, as part of the 2005 Base Realignment and Closure (BRAC) round realigning Fort Bragg. It is tasked with conducting special operations in Latin America. Camp Bull Simons is a U.S. Army installation on Eglin Air Force Base in Florida that serves as the home for the 7th Special Forces Group (Airborne). It is named after Colonel Arthur D. “Bull” Simons, a highly decorated Special Forces officer. The camp hosts training exercises like close-quarters battle assessments and serves the community with facilities such as a chapel, clinic, and a new child development center to address family support needs. Camp Bull Simons is located on the grounds of Eglin Air Force Base, approximately 45 minutes north of the main base.

=== Tenant units ===
Tenant units at an Air Force installation are units which have a mission that is significantly different from that of the host unit, and rely heavily upon the host unit for day-to-day operations (sewer, power, security, recreation).

==== 6th Ranger Training Battalion (6th RTB) ====
Eglin AFB Auxiliary Field No. 6 (Biancur Field) is the site of Camp James E. Rudder and the home of the U.S. Army's 6th Ranger Training Battalion. The 6th RTB conducts the final phase of the U.S. Army Ranger Course. The entire course is 61 days long and is divided into three phases. Each phase is conducted at different geographical and environmental locations.

==== 20th Space Control Squadron (20 SPCS) ====
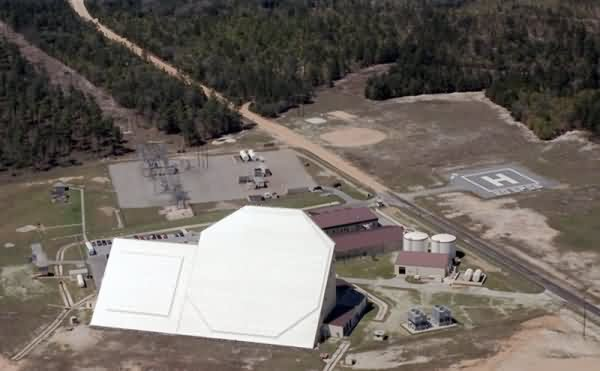
Buildings housing the 20th Space Control Squadron's AN/FPS-85 phased array radar at Eglin Air Force Base Site C-6

The mission of the 20 SPCS is to detect, track, identify, and report near Earth and deep space objects in Earth's orbit, and provide space object identification data in support of United States Space Command's space control mission. A unit of the United States Space Force (USSF), the men and women of the 20th SPCS operate and maintain the AN/FPS-85 radar, the Space Force's only phased-array radar dedicated to tracking Earth-orbiting objects.

==== 323 Squadron RNLAF ====
The 323 Squadron RNLAF is a Royal Netherlands Air Force Operational Test and Evaluation squadron which operates two F-35As

==== 486th Flight Test Squadron (486th FLTS) ====
486th FLTS, which is apparently not a test squadron at all, operates Boeing C-32Bs in discrete missions for the United States Department of State's Foreign Emergency Support Team.

==== 919th Special Operations Wing (919 SOW) ====
The 919 SOW, located about five miles (8.0 kilometers) south of Crestview and 32 kilometres (20 mi) from Eglin main at Eglin AFB Auxiliary Field No. 3 (Duke Field) and is the only special operations wing in the Air Force Reserve Command (AFRC). In wartime or a contingency, the 919 SOW reports to Air Force Special Operations Command (AFSOC) at Hurlburt Field, Florida, its gaining major command.

==== AFOTEC Det 2 ====
The Air Force Operational Test and Evaluation Center stood up Detachment 2 at Eglin to provide realistic operational testing for new and modified weapon systems.

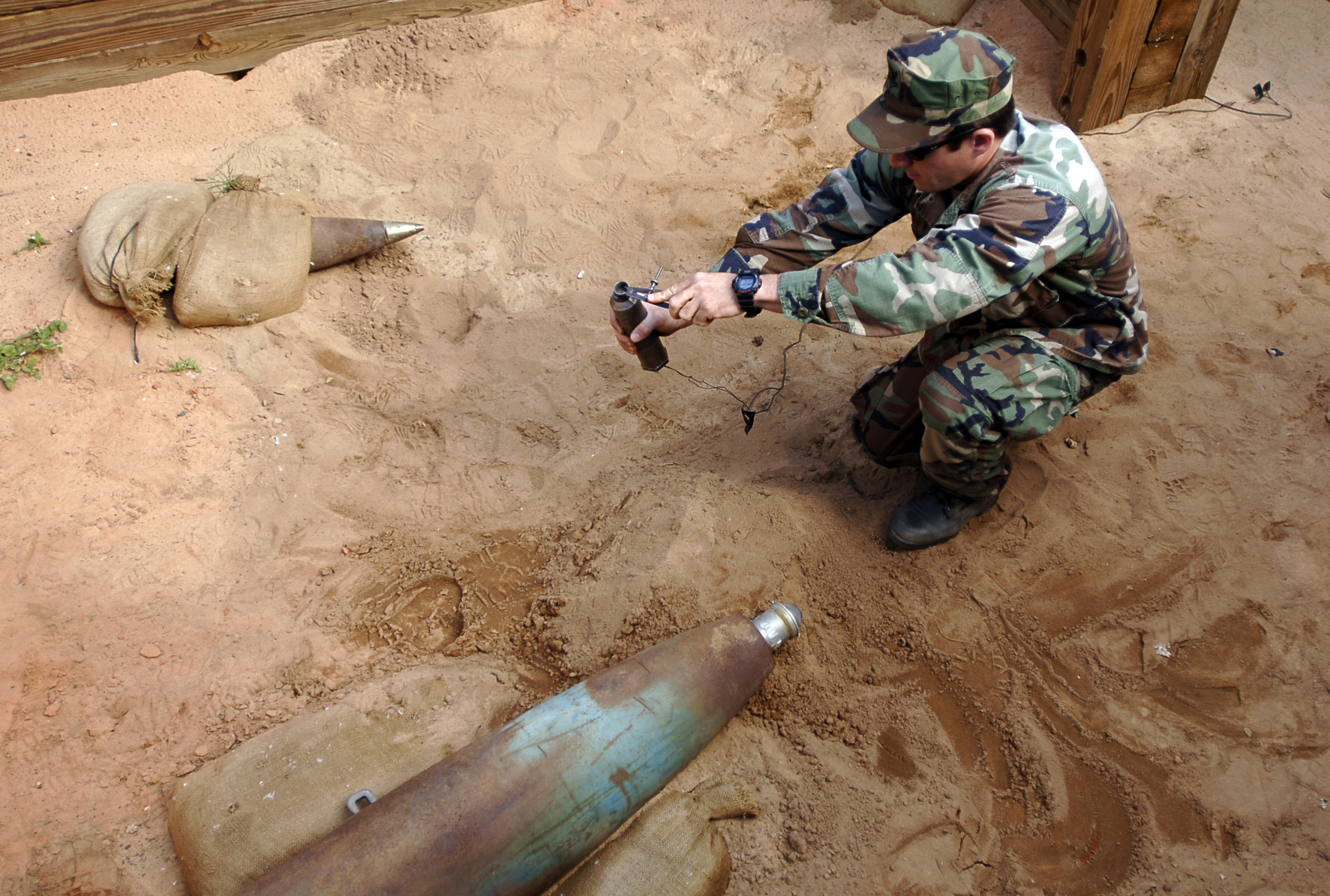
An explosive charge is prepared to be used for rendering unexploded ordnance safe to handle at the Naval School of Explosive Ordnance Disposal.

==== Naval School of Explosive Ordnance Disposal (EOD) ====
The Naval School of Explosive Ordnance Disposal (NAVSCOLEOD) is a Navy-managed command, jointly staffed by Army, Navy, Air Force, and Marine Corps personnel. NAVSCOLEOD opened its new consolidated training facility in April 1999.

==== Joint Assessment Division (JAD) ====
Directorate of the Joint Staff, JAD (formerly the Joint Deployable Analysis Team) conducts field analysis of CJADC2 C2 information systems and procedures producing decision-quality data to improve Joint C2 integration and interoperability.

=== Scheduled airline service ===
Eglin is also one of the few military air bases in the U.S. to have scheduled passenger airline service as the Destin–Fort Walton Beach Airport (VPS) is co-located on the base property.

== Based units ==
Flying and notable non-flying units based at Eglin Air Force Base.

Units marked GSU are Geographically Separate Units, which although based at Eglin, are subordinate to a parent unit based at another location.

For units permanently based at Eglin's auxiliary airfields, see the airfield's respective page (Biancur Field, Duke Field and Hurlburt Field).

=== United States Air Force ===
Air Force Materiel Command (AFMC)

- Air Force Test Center
  - 96th Test Wing (Host wing)
    - 96th Cyberspace Test Group
      - 45th Test Squadron
      - 46th Test Squadron
      - 47th Cyberspace Test Squadron
      - 48th Cyberspace Test Squadron
    - 96th Operations Group
      - 40th Flight Test Squadron – A-10C Thunderbolt II, F-15C/D Eagle, F-15E Strike Eagle, F-15EX Eagle II, F-16C/D Fighting Falcon
    - 96th Maintenance Group
    - 96th Mission Support Group
    - 96th Range Group
    - 96th Medical Group
- Air Force Life Cycle Management Center
  - Armament Directorate
- Air Force Research Laboratory
  - Munitions Directorate
- 486th Flight Test Squadron – C-32B

Air Combat Command (ACC)

- Fifteenth Air Force
  - 33rd Fighter Wing
    - F-35 Academic Training Center
    - 33rd Operations Group
      - 33d Operations Support Squadron
      - 58th Fighter Squadron – F-35A Lightning II
      - 60th Fighter Squadron – F-35A Lightning II
      - F-35 Intelligence Formal Training Unit
      - 337th Air Control Squadron
    - 33d Maintenance Group
      - 33d Aircraft Maintenance Squadron
      - 33d Maintenance Operations Squadron
      - 33d Maintenance Squadron
- Sixteenth Air Force
  - 688th Cyberspace Wing
    - 690th Cyberspace Operations Group
      - 692nd Cyberspace Operations Squadron (GSU)
- US Air Force Warfare Center
  - 53d Wing
    - 53d Test and Evaluation Group
      - 85th Test and Evaluation Squadron – F-15C Eagle, F-15E Strike Eagle, F-15EX Eagle II, F-16C/D Fighting Falcon
  - 350th Spectrum Warfare Wing
    - 350th Spectrum Warfare Group

Air Force Reserve Command (AFRC)

- Tenth Air Force
  - 926th Wing
    - 926th Operation Group
      - 84th Test and Evaluation Squadron (GSU) – F-15C Eagle, F-15E Strike Eagle, F-15EX Eagle II, F-16C/D Fighting Falcon

Direct Reporting Units (DRU)

- Air Force Operational Test and Evaluation Center
  - Detachment 2 (GSU)

=== United States Army ===
Special Operations Command (Airborne) (USASOC)

- 1st Special Forces Command (Airborne)
  - 7th Special Forces Group (Airborne)

=== United States Navy ===
United States Fleet Forces Command (USFF)

- Navy Expeditionary Combat Command
  - Naval School Explosive Ordnance Disposal

=== United States Space Force ===
Space Operations Command

- Space Delta 2
  - 20th Space Control Squadron (GSU)

=== Department of Defense ===
Joint Chiefs of Staff (JCS)

- J6 Directorate (Command, Control, Communications and Computers/Cyber)
  - Joint Deployable Analysis Team

== Previous names ==
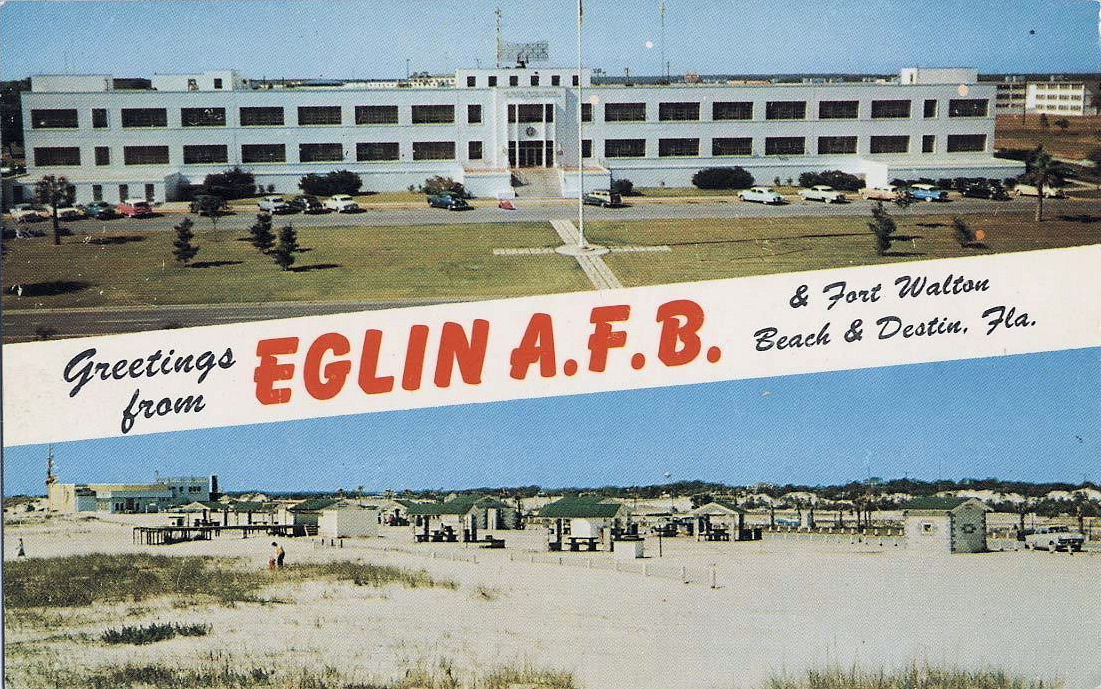
Eglin AFB postcard from the 1970s

- Established as Valparaiso Bombing and Gunnery Base, 14 June 1935

(spelling changed on 1 February 1937 from "Valparaiso" to "Valpariso" and on 1 March 1937 back to "Valparaiso")

- Eglin Field, 4 August 1937
- Eglin Field Military Reservation, 1 October 1940
- Eglin Field, 28 December 1944
- Eglin Air Force Base, 24 June 1948–present

== Major commands to which assigned ==
- Air Corps Training Center, 9 June 1935 – 27 August 1940
- Southeast Air Corps Training Center, 27 August 1940 – 1 April 1942

Also assigned to Commanding General, Fourth Corps Area, United States Army, June 1941-1 April 1942

- Chief of the Army Air Corps (Direct subordination), 19 May 1941 – 1 April 1942
- AAF Proving Ground Command**, 1 April 1942 – 1 June 1945
- AAF Center, 1 June 1945

Re-designated: AAF Proving Ground Command, 8 March 1946
Re-designated: Air Proving Ground Command, 10 July 1946 – 20 January 1948

- Air Materiel Command, 20 January 1948 – 1 June 1948
- Air Proving Ground, 1 June 1948

Re-designated: Air Proving Ground Command, 20 December 1951 – 1 December 1957

- Air Research and Development Command, 1 December 1957

Re-designated: Air Force Systems Command, 1 April 1961 – 1 July 1992

- Air Force Materiel Command, 1 July 1992 – present

** Discontinued 8 March 1946. Not related to later AAF Proving Ground Command

== Major units assigned ==
- 84th Service Squadron (Detachment), 14 June 1935
- Section V, Eglin Field Section, 13th Air Base Squadron, 1 September 1936
- Det 13th Air Base Squadron, 1 August 1940
- 61st Air Base Group, 1 December 1940 – 17 February 1943
- Air Corps Specialized Flying School, 1 December 1940 – 1 April 1944
- Army Air Forces Proving Ground, 15 May 1941 – 30 June 1946
- 23d Composite Group

Re-designated: 1st Proving Ground Group, 29 June 1941
Re-designated: 610th Army Air Forces Base Unit, 1 April 1944 – 30 June 1947

- 609th Army Air Forces Base Unit, 1 July 1947 – 1 July 1948
- 1st Experimental Guided Missiles Group, 6 February 1946 – 1 December 1950
- 3201st Air Base Group (later Wing), 1 July 1948 – 4 February 1958
- 3200th Proof Test Group, 1 July 1948 – 1 July 1953
- Air Proving Ground Command

Re-designated: Armament Division and Test Center
Re-designated: Air Armament Center, 1 July 1948 – 18 July 2012

- 550th Guided Missiles Wing, 20 July 1949 – 11 December 1950
- USAF Armament Center, 14 December 1949 – 4 February 1958
- 3205th Drone Group, 26 April 1950 – 1 February 1961
- 3200th Proof Test Wing, 1 April 1951 – 1 July 1952
- 3206th Support Wing, 1 July 1953 – 20 February 1964
- 3207th Armament testing Systems
- 17th Bombardment Wing, 1 April 1955 – 25 June 1958
- 4751st Air Defense Missile Squadron, 15 January 1958 – 30 September 1979
- 335th Tactical Fighter Squadron, May 1958 – November 1961
- 4135th Strategic Wing, 1 December 1958 – 1 February 1963
- 1st Combat Application Group, 17 April 1962 – 5 September 1968
- USAF Special Air Warfare Center, 27 April 1962 – 1 July 1974
- 39th Bombardment Wing, 1 February 1963 – 25 February 1965
- USAF Air Warfare Center, 1 November 1963 – 1 October 1995
- 4485th Test Wing, 16 March 1964 – 30 June 1965
- 33d Fighter Wing, 1 April 1965 – present
- 40th Fighter-Interceptor Squadron, 20 June 1965 – 15 October 1970
- USAF Armament Laboratory, 1 March 1966 – 18 July 2012
- USAF Special Operations School, 15 April 1967 – present
- 3246th Test Wing, 1 July 1970 – 1 October 1992
- 919th Special Operations Wing, 30 July 1971 – present
- 4443d Test and Evaluation Group, 1 July 1988

Re-designated: 79th Test and Evaluation Group, 1 December 1991 – 20 November 1998

- 46th Test Wing, 1 October 1992 – 18 July 2012
- 96th Test Wing, 15 March 1994 – present
- 53d Wing, 1 October 1995 – present
- 308th Armament Systems Wing, 27 January 2005 – 30 June 2010
- Eglin Composite Squadron Civil Air Patrol

== Eglin auxiliary fields ==
A number of auxiliary fields were constructed on the Eglin reservation during World War II, many of which are still in service in various roles, either in support of flight operations or special test activities.

- Auxiliary Field 1 (Wagner Field)

Work on Auxiliary Field 1 began 27 November 1940. Auxiliary Field 1 is named Wagner Field for Maj. Walter J. Wagner, former commanding officer for the 1st Proving Ground, Eglin Field, who was killed 19 October 1943 in the crash of a Douglas XA-26B, s/n 41-19588, 9 miles east of Eglin Field, Valpariso, FL. Much of the Doolittle Raid and Operation Credible Sport training took place here. The U.S. Navy used the field as an auxiliary facility for pilot training out of Whiting Field for a time, dating from early 1960. A proposal by the National Aeronautics and Space Administration to build a multi-million dollar research installation for testing rocket fuels and components at Field 1 in early 1960 was dropped in mid-February, the chief reason for consideration being abandoned "was the possibility the military would have other uses for the field in the near future." It is also known as Site C-5. Range C-72 extends SE from Wagner Field.

- Auxiliary Field 2 (Pierce Field)

Auxiliary Field 2 is named Pierce Field for Lt. Col. George E. Pierce, killed 19 October 1942 while piloting a North American B-25C-1 Mitchell which crashed into the Gulf of Mexico 3.2 kilometres (2 mi) S of Destin, Florida. Joe Baugher cites date of 19 October 1942 for loss. It is also known as Site C-3. Between November 1966 and 1970, it was the site of the 560th Civil Engineering Squadron, also known as the Civil Engineering Field Activities Center, for the training of Red Horse personnel.

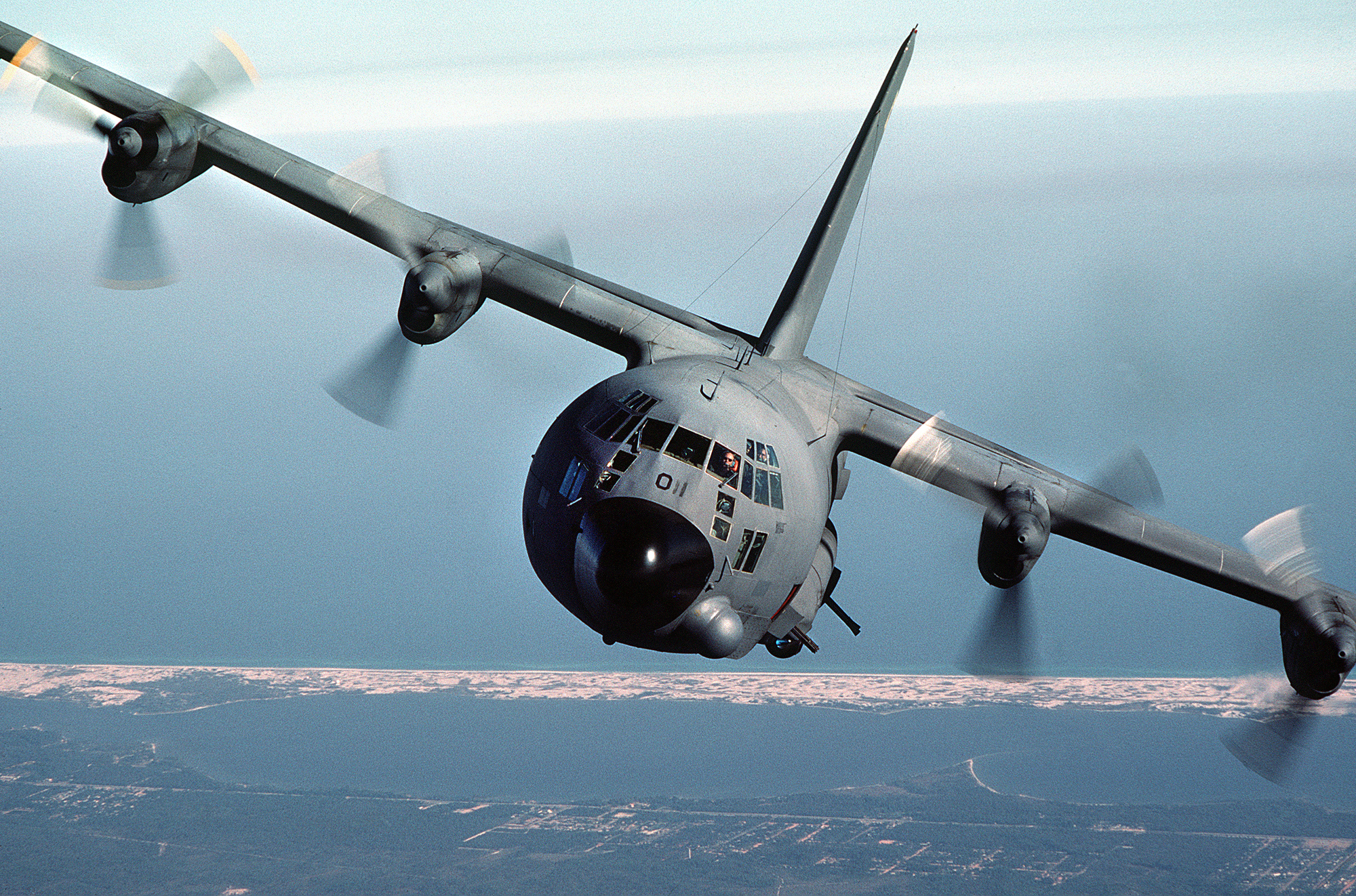
An AC-130A Spectre gunship aircraft, 55-011, performs a pylon turn over Range 77 during a training mission in 1984. The aircraft was from the 919th Special Operations Group at Eglin's Duke Field, retired to AMARC on 15 November 1994. This late afternoon view looks south with Santa Rosa Sound, Santa Rosa Island, home of Eglin missile launch sites since 1944, and the Gulf of Mexico beyond.

- Auxiliary Field 3 (Duke Field)

Auxiliary Field 3 is named Duke Field for 1st Lt Robert L. Duke, killed in the crash of a Curtiss A-25A-20-CS Shrike near Spencer, Tennessee, on 29 December 1943. He was assigned as Assistant A-3 of Eglin Field. Used as the set for the fictional 918th Bomb Group in the 1949 film Twelve O'Clock High. Field 3 was long-associated with drone operations of the 3200th and 3205th Drone Groups. Aircraft were "sanitized" (stripped of all identification) here for the failed Bay of Pigs Invasion of Cuba.

- Auxiliary Field 4 (Peel Field)

Auxiliary Field 4 is named Peel Field for 2nd Lt. Garland O. Peel Jr., who died in the take-off crash of a Martin B-12AM of the 387th School Squadron, 2 January 1942, when he suffered engine failure. He was a gunnery school instructor at Eglin. Peel Field was utilized for the filming of scenes for the 1944 film Thirty Seconds Over Tokyo. Wartime temporary housing for NCOs located here was razed in the 1960s. In the early 1960s, while in a moribund state, one of the runways was used as an unofficial auto drag strip by local civilians. The ramp of the non-flight-rated facility now serves as a vehicle park for aircraft and armor after being expended as targets on the Eglin ranges.

- Auxiliary Field 5 (Piccolo Field)

Auxiliary Field 5 is named Piccolo Field for Capt. Anthony D. Piccolo, who died in the crash of a North American AT-6A-NT Texan on 6 October 1942. Piccolo was the commanding officer of the 386th Single Engine Gunnery Training Squadron at Eglin. Today, the area is due north of Field Four and serves as a microwave station. A 60-foot radar antenna was installed here in April 1961. On most base maps, it is identified as Site C-4. Doolittle Raid training was conducted here.

- Auxiliary Field 6 (Biancur Field)

Auxiliary Field 6 is named Biancur Field for 1st Lt. Andrew Biancur, a test pilot of the Medium Bombardment Section of the 1st Proving Ground Group, killed 8 January 1944 in the crash of a Northrop YP-61-NO Black Widow at Eglin Field. The U.S. Army Ranger facility Camp Rudder is located here. It is designated Site B-6. The X-43A-LS low-speed demonstrator underwent testing out of Auxiliary Field 6 in November 2003.

- Auxiliary Field 7 (Epler Field)

Auxiliary Field 7 is named Epler Field for Col. Robin E. Epler, deputy commander (Technical) of the Air Proving Ground Command, Eglin Field, Florida, killed 28 January 1944 in the crash of a Douglas A-20G-10-DO Havoc one-mile (1.6 km) NE of Crestview, Florida. It is designated Site B-12.

- Auxiliary Field 8 (Baldsiefen Field)

Auxiliary Field 8 is named Baldsiefen Field for 2nd Lt. Richard Edward Baldsiefen, a gunnery instructor at Eglin, killed 4 March 1942 along with Lt. John W. Smith, in the crash of a North American AT-6A-NA Texan which came down at Auxiliary Field 4. It is designated Site C-52C.

- Auxiliary Field 9 (Hurlburt Field)

Auxiliary Field 9 is named Hurlburt Field for Lt. Donald Wilson Hurlburt, killed 1 October 1943 when his Lockheed AT-18-LO Hudson gunnery trainer crashed during take-off at Eglin. After flying Boeing B-17 Flying Fortress combat missions from Great Britain and receiving the Distinguished Flying Cross (DFC), Hurlburt was assigned in mid-1943 to the First Proving Ground Electronics Test Unit at Eglin Field. Field 9 was named in his honor by base commander General Grandison Gardner. Hurlburt's nephew was Captain Craig D. Button (noted for his mysterious flight and crash of an A-10 Thunderbolt on 2 April 1997). An official history of Eglin AFB's early years cites 2 October 1943 as the date of this accident.

- Auxiliary Field 10 (Dillon Field)

Auxiliary Field 10 is the westernmost of the wartime Eglin airfields, located in Santa Rosa County, and is named Dillon Field for Capt. Barclay H. Dillon, test pilot of the Fighter Section of the 1st Proving Ground Group, killed 2 October 1943 when his Lockheed P-38J-5-LO Lightning crashed 13 kilometres (8 mi) W of Milton, Florida. Field 10 was later named Eglin Dillon Airdrome. Now used primarily for U.S. Navy basic flight training, the Navy refers to it as Naval Outlying Landing Field Choctaw (NOLF). It is also used for Unmanned Aerial Vehicle [UAV] training, and it is expected that F-35 Lightning IIs assigned to the 33d Fighter Wing at Eglin Air Force Base will utilize NOLF Choctaw for training.

- Auxiliary Field 11 is an unconfirmed name for a Red Horse unsurfaced east–west airstrip that shows up on Google Earth in Walton County.
- The Santa Rosa Island Range Complex is part of the Eglin overwater range that provides 86,500 square miles of overwater airspace that is jointly used for a variety of test and evaluation activities and training exercises.

== Demographics ==
Historical population
Census	Pop.	Note	%±
1990	8,347		—
2000	8,082		−3.2%
2010	2,274		−71.9%
2020	3,006		32.2%
U.S. Decennial Census

Eglin employs more than 8,500 civilians and approximately 4,500 military, with an additional 2,200 jobs due to move to Eglin under the 2005 BRAC.

The Eglin AFB census-designated place (CDP), referred to simply as the Eglin CDP until the 2010 census, had a population of 3,006 at the 2020 census, up from 2,274 at the 2010 census. It is part of the Crestview–Fort Walton Beach–Destin metropolitan area.

As of the census of 2000, there were 8,082 people, 2,302 households, and 2,262 families residing on the base. The population density was 2,640.1 people per square mile (1,019.3 people/km^{2}). There were 2,320 housing units at an average density of 757.9 per square mile (292.6/km^{2}). The racial makeup of the base was 71.8% White, 14.8% Black or African American, 0.5% Native American, 3.0% Asian, 0.4% Pacific Islander, 4.2% from other races, and 5.3% from two or more races. Hispanic or Latino people of any race were 11.2% of the population.

There were 2,302 households, out of which 79.8% had children under the age of 18 living with them, 89.8% were married couples living together, 5.2% had a female householder with no husband present, and 1.7% were non-families. 1.6% of all households were made up of individuals, and 0.0% had someone living alone who was 65 years of age or older. The average household size was 3.50 and the average family size was 3.51.

On the base the population was spread out, with 43.5% under the age of 18, 15.2% from 18 to 24, 39.6% from 25 to 44, 1.6% from 45 to 64, and 0.1% who were 65 years of age or older. The median age was 22 years. For every 100 females, there were 100.6 males.

The median income for a household on the base was $31,951, and the median income for a family was $31,859. Males had a median income of $25,409 versus $19,176 for females. The per capita income for the base was $10,670. About 4.5% of families and 4.5% of the population were below the poverty line, including 4.5% of those under the age of 18 and none of those 65 and older.

== National historic status ==
There are two U.S. National Historic Landmark Districts with connections to the base: Camp Pinchot and Eglin Field.

On 6 October 1997, the McKinley Climatic Laboratory was added to the U.S. National Register of Historic Places.

== Education ==
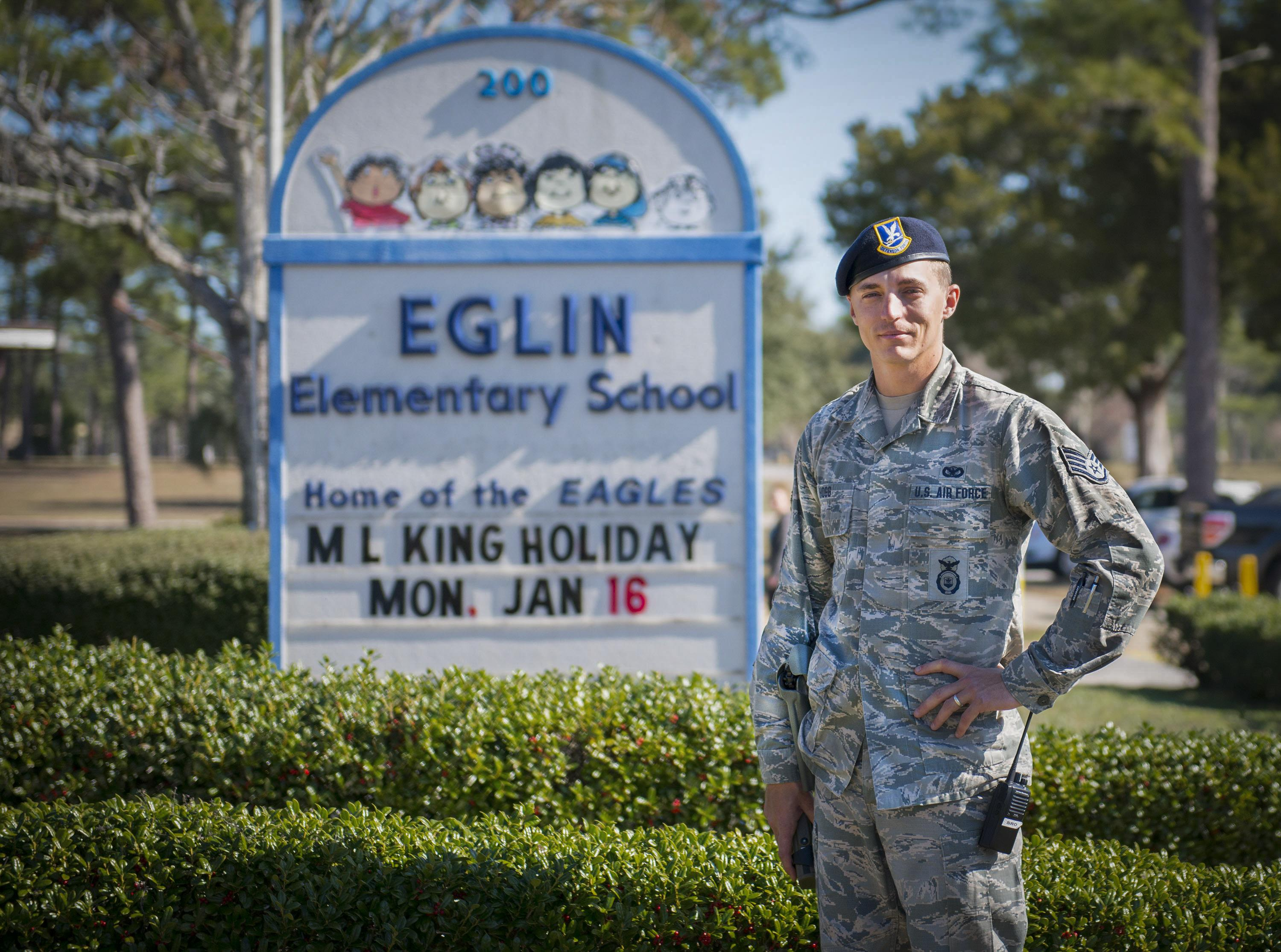
Eglin Elementary School

The Okaloosa County School District operates Eglin Elementary School on-post. The zoned secondary schools for on-post families are Lewis Middle School and Niceville High School.

== Notable residents ==
- Author Hunter S. Thompson was stationed on Eglin from 1956 until 1958 during his enlistment with the Air Force.
- Infielder Jay Bell was born in the base hospital in 1965.
- Former running back Glen Coffee was born in the base hospital in 1987
- NASCAR Cup Series driver Aric Almirola was born in Eglin in 1984.
- John Boyd, USAF officer and military strategist who developed the Energy–maneuverability theory while stationed at Eglin.
- Professional cyclist Neilson Powless, first rider of Native American ancestry to compete in the Tour de France, was born at Eglin.
- Former soccer player, member of the United States national soccer team at the 1930 FIFA World Cup, Mike Bookie died in Camp Eglin in 1944 at the age of 40.

== Eglin AFB in pop culture ==
- Movies that have been filmed in part at Eglin Air Force Base or its outlying auxiliary airfields, Thirty Seconds Over Tokyo in 1944, Twelve O' Clock High in 1949, On the Threshold of Space in 1955 and Search for Paradise in 1956.
- Thirteen airmen assigned to the 48th Recovery Squadron played a part in the 1965 James Bond movie Thunderball. The airmen, all highly skilled paratroopers, assisted in a sky diving scene filmed in Miami Beach. They jumped out of an HC-97 in Biscayne Bay at an altitude of 1,500 feet. A quote from TSgt Lewis Roberts said, "We played the good guys and were helping James Bond destroy the villains who were about to blow up the East Coast."
- Several Tom Clancy novels refer to "raking the sand traps on the officers' golf course" at Eglin as a common activity for low-security prisoners at the associated Federal Prison Camp, Eglin, now closed.
- F-15 Eagles from Eglin's 33rd Fighter Wing, 59th Fighter Squadron, were used in the filming of the 1997 movie Air Force One.
- Eglin AFB appears as the default airport in the simulation software Prepar3D.

== Geography ==
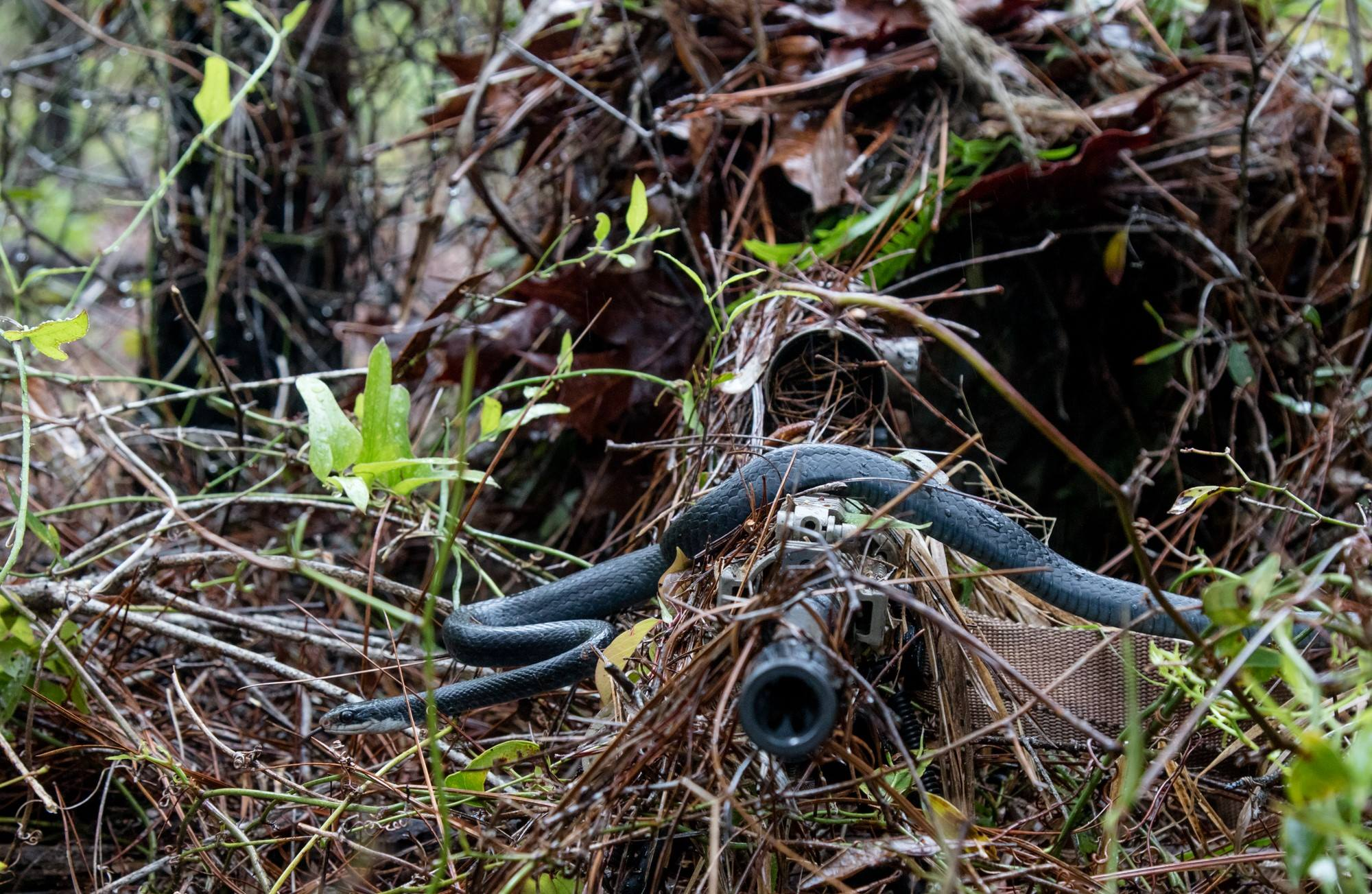
A southern black racer snake slithers across the barrel of junior U.S. Army National Guard sniper Pfc. William Snyder's rifle.

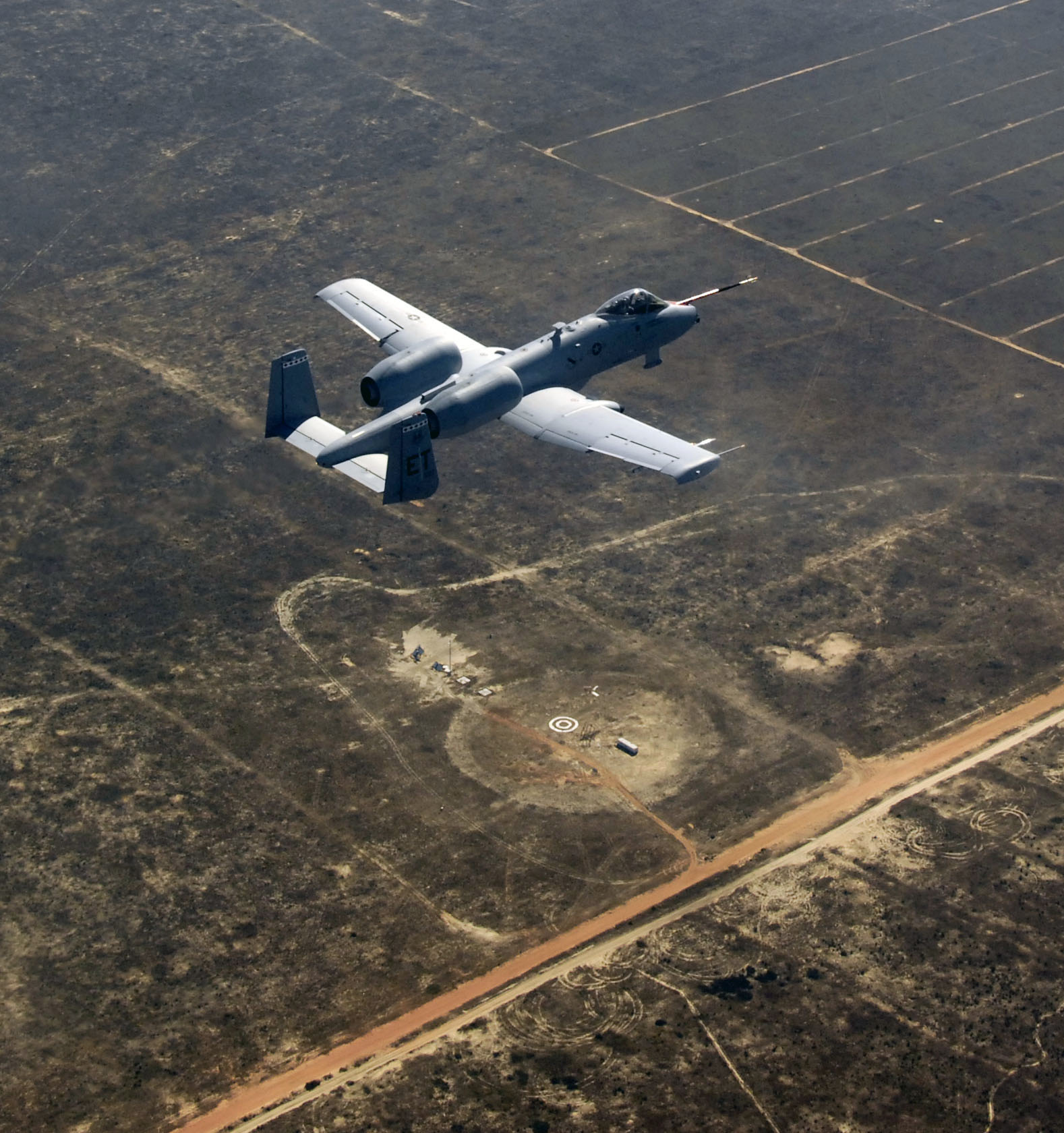
An A-10C Thunderbolt II, piloted by the 40th Flight Test Squadron, flies over what is left of a target that was successfully hit by a Laser Joint Direct Attack Munition drop on the Eglin range.

=== Flora and fauna ===
The forests and shores of Eglin Air Force Base are at the center of one of the most biodiverse locations in North America. Over 50 species threatened in Florida are found on the base, including sea turtles that nest on its white-sand beaches and red-cockaded woodpeckers that thrive in its longleaf pine forests. The base has a natural resources management team that constantly monitors important species within the base with the goal of balancing their national defense mission with environmental stewardship. Longleaf pine forest, a forest type reduced to 5% of its former range in the last few centuries, covers 200,000 acres (810 km^{2}) of the base. Part of this forest, 6,795 acres (27.50 km^{2}), is old growth, making the base home to one of the most extensive old-growth longleaf pine forests in the world.

=== Climate ===
Warm, subtropical weather lasts longer than the average summer. The annual precipitation ranges from 25 to 60 inches (640 to 1,520 mm). Year-round, the average temperatures run:

January–March: 60–69 High and 42–51 Low
April–June: 76–88 High and 58–72 Low
July–September: 86–98 High and 70–77 Low
October–December: 63–79 High and 44–69 Low

The area gets only 50 to 60 days of annual precipitation or more rainfall. There are few days without sunshine, which allows year-round outdoor activities.

=== Noise ===
In order to deal with the high noise levels of the Lockheed Martin F-35 Lightning II, officials from Santa Rosa, Okaloosa and Walton counties are studying which homes, businesses and public buildings will require additional noise protection.

== Civil rocketry ==
Eglin Air Force Base was also a launch site for civil rockets of NASA. There are three launch pads: one at 29.6700 N, 85.3700 W at Cape San Blas; and two on Santa Rosa Island at 30.3800 N, 86.7400 W and 30.3800 N, 86.8170 W. Rockets launched here have included Arcas, Nike Cajun, Nike Apaches, and Nike Iroquois. This site was formerly operated by the 4751st ADMS with CIM-10 Bomarcs, which inactivated in 1979. In the 1940s, captured V-1 flying bombs and American copies, Republic-Ford JB-2 LOONs, were launched out over the Gulf of Mexico from these sites. Two concrete launch ramps were placed on the National Register of Historic Places in 1996. A rusting Loon launch ramp still exists at Auxiliary Field 1, Wagner Field.

Eglin is known to have been used for 441 launches from 1959 to 1980, reaching up to 686 kilometers altitude.

== Amateur radio restrictions ==
The US Code of Federal Regulations specifies that amateur radio operators within 322 kilometers of Eglin must not transmit with more than 50 watts of power on the 70-centimeter band.

== Accidents and incidents ==
- On August 31, 2018, a Beechcraft Duke crashed on Eglin Air Force Base property.

== See also ==
- Florida World War II Army Airfields
- List of United States Air Force installations
- Rocket launch sites
