= Paul W. Airey =

Chief Master Sergeant of the United States Air Force

Paul Wesley Airey
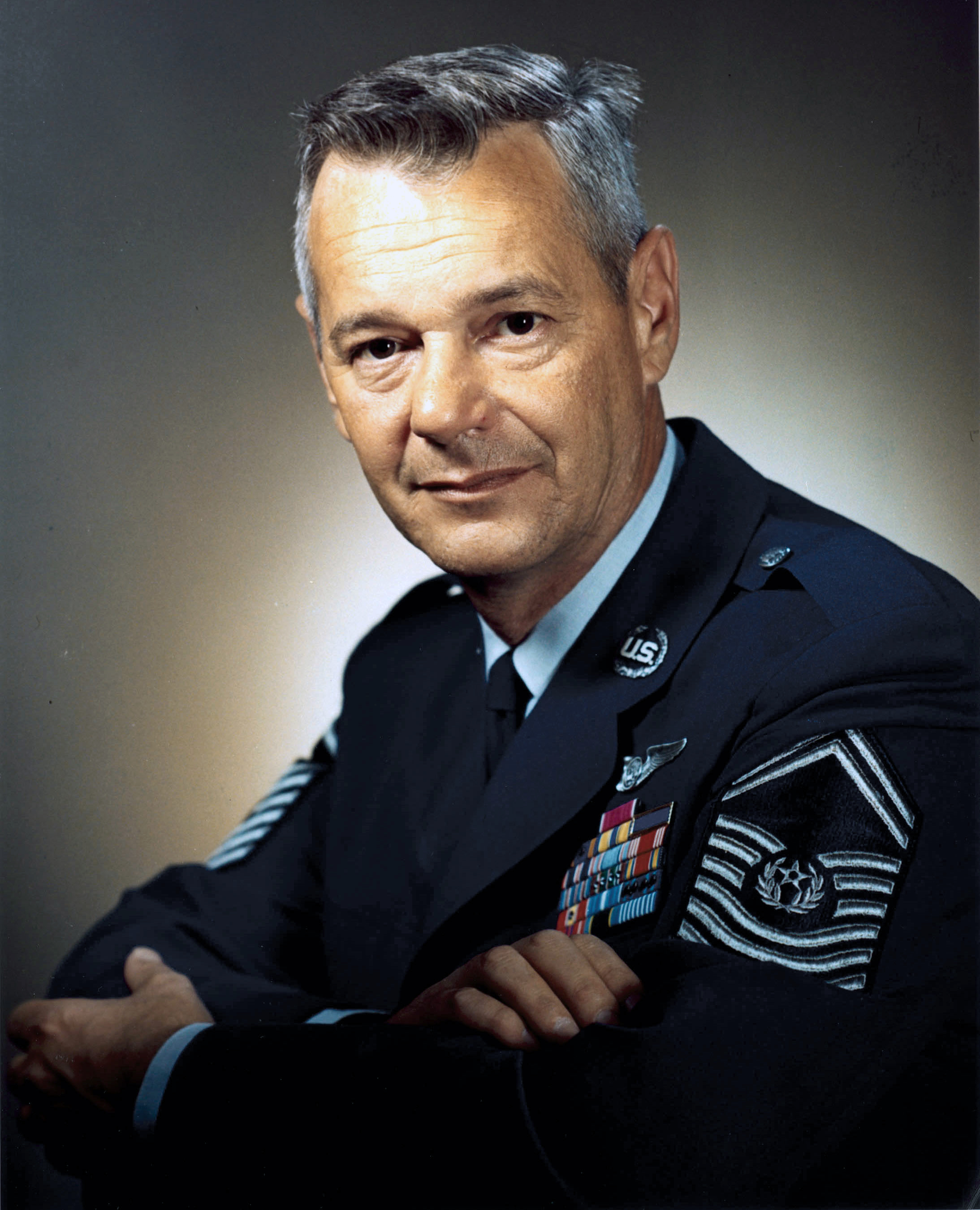
- Chief Master Sergeant Paul Wesley Airey c. 1967
- Born: December 13, 1923; Quincy, Massachusetts, US
- Died: March 11, 2009 (aged 85); Panama City, Florida, US
- Burial place: Arlington National Cemetery
- Military career
- Allegiance: United States
- Branch: United States Army Air Forces; United States Air Force
- Service years: 1940–1970
- Rank: Chief Master Sergeant of the Air Force
- Conflicts: World War II; Korean War
- Awards: Legion of Merit (2); Meritorious Service Medal; Air Medal (2); Air Force Commendation Medal

Paul Wesley Airey (December 13, 1923 – March 11, 2009) was an airman of the United States Air Force who served as the first Chief Master Sergeant of the Air Force from 1967 to 1969.

== Early life and education ==
Airey born on December 13, 1923, in New Bedford, Massachusetts. He entered military service in 1940 after two years of high school in Quincy, Massachusetts. In 1948 he obtained his high school equivalency certificate, and later completed 62 semester hours of study at McKendree College, Lebanon, Illinois. His military schooling included courses in communication mechanics and personnel management. He is a graduate of the Air Defense Command Noncommissioned Officer Academy. The academy was renamed the Paul W. Airey NCO Academy on December 13, 2006, in his honor.

== Military career ==
Airey enlisted in the United States Army Air Forces in November 1942 and completed basic training in Atlantic City, New Jersey at Brigantine Field. He attended radio operator school at Scott Field, Illinois and promoted to private first class. He was then sent to aerial gunnery school at Tyndall Field in Florida and promoted to sergeant. He completed B-24 transition training at Gowen Field, Idaho and then joined the 485th Bombardment Group at Fairmont Army Air Base in Nebraska and was promoted to staff sergeant.

During World War II, he was an aerial gunner and radio operator on B-24 Liberator bombers and is credited with 28 combat missions over Europe. In July 1944, on his 28th combat mission, a bombing run over Vienna, Austria, then Technical Sergeant Airey was forced to bail out of his flak-damaged aircraft over Hungary. He was captured by the German military and was taken to Stalag Luft IV, a prisoner of war (POW) camp near the Baltic Sea for Allied airmen. In February 1945, Airey and 6,000 fellow POWs were forced to march 400 miles to another camp near Berlin as the Soviet Red Army got closer. He was liberated in May 1945 by the British Second Army. By that time, Airey had dysentery and weighed less than 100 pounds.

Airey reenlisted in the Air Force after completing a recuperation leave. In 1948, he was promoted to master sergeant and was sent to Naha Air Base, Okinawa, where he was the non-commissioned officer in charge of communications for his wing. During the Korean War he was awarded the Legion of Merit, unusual for an enlisted person, for saving more than a million dollars in electronic equipment that would have deteriorated without the corrosion control assembly line he developed.

In 1953, Airey would take the first of several assignments as a first sergeant and spend the next 14 years as a first sergeant. This included assignment to the Air Defense Command's 4756th Civil Engineering Squadron at Tyndall Air Force Base, Florida.

On April 3, 1967, he was appointed the first Chief Master Sergeant of the Air Force (CMSAF), the service's ultimate noncommissioned officer position, having been selected from among 21 major command nominees. In this role he was adviser to Secretary of the Air Force Harold Brown and Air Force Chief of Staff, General John P. McConnell on matters concerning welfare, effective utilization and progress of Air Force enlisted personnel.

Airey saw the biggest challenge of his time as CMSAF was personnel retention at the height of the Vietnam War in addition to low pay, remote assignments and an unfair promotion system. His work helped created the Weighted Airman Promotion System (WAPS) to help make promotions more fair and transparent.

== Personal life and death ==
After returning from World War II, Airey married his high school sweetheart Shirley Babbitt. Airey retired from the Air Force on August 1, 1970 after 30 years of service. He died in Panama City, Florida, on March 11, 2009.

== Awards and decorations ==
US Air Force Enlisted Aircrew Badge

Personal decorations
Width-44 crimson ribbon with a pair of width-2 white stripes on the edges	Legion of Merit with bronze oak leaf cluster
Width-44 crimson ribbon with two width-8 white stripes at distance 4 from the edges.	Meritorious Service Medal
	Air Medal with bronze oak leaf cluster
	Air Force Commendation Medal
Unit awards
	Presidential Unit Citation
	Air Force Outstanding Unit Award
Service awards
	Prisoner of War Medal
	Air Force Good Conduct Medal
	Army Good Conduct Medal
Campaign and service medals
	American Campaign Medal
	European-African-Middle Eastern Campaign Medal with four bronze service stars
	World War II Victory Medal
Width=44 scarlet ribbon with a central width-4 golden yellow stripe, flanked by pairs of width-1 scarlet, white, Old Glory blue, and white stripes	National Defense Service Medal with bronze service star
	Korean Service Medal
Service, training, and marksmanship awards
	Air Force Longevity Service Award with four bronze oak leaf clusters
	NCO Professional Military Education Graduate Ribbon
	Small Arms Expert Marksmanship Ribbon
Foreign awards
	United Nations Service Medal for Korea

=== Professional memberships and associations ===
- Air Force Memorial Foundation
- Air University Foundation
- Airmen Memorial Museum

Military offices
New title	Chief Master Sergeant of the Air Force; 1967–1969	Succeeded by Donald L. Harlow
