= Eric W. Benken =

12th Chief Master Sergeant of the Air Force

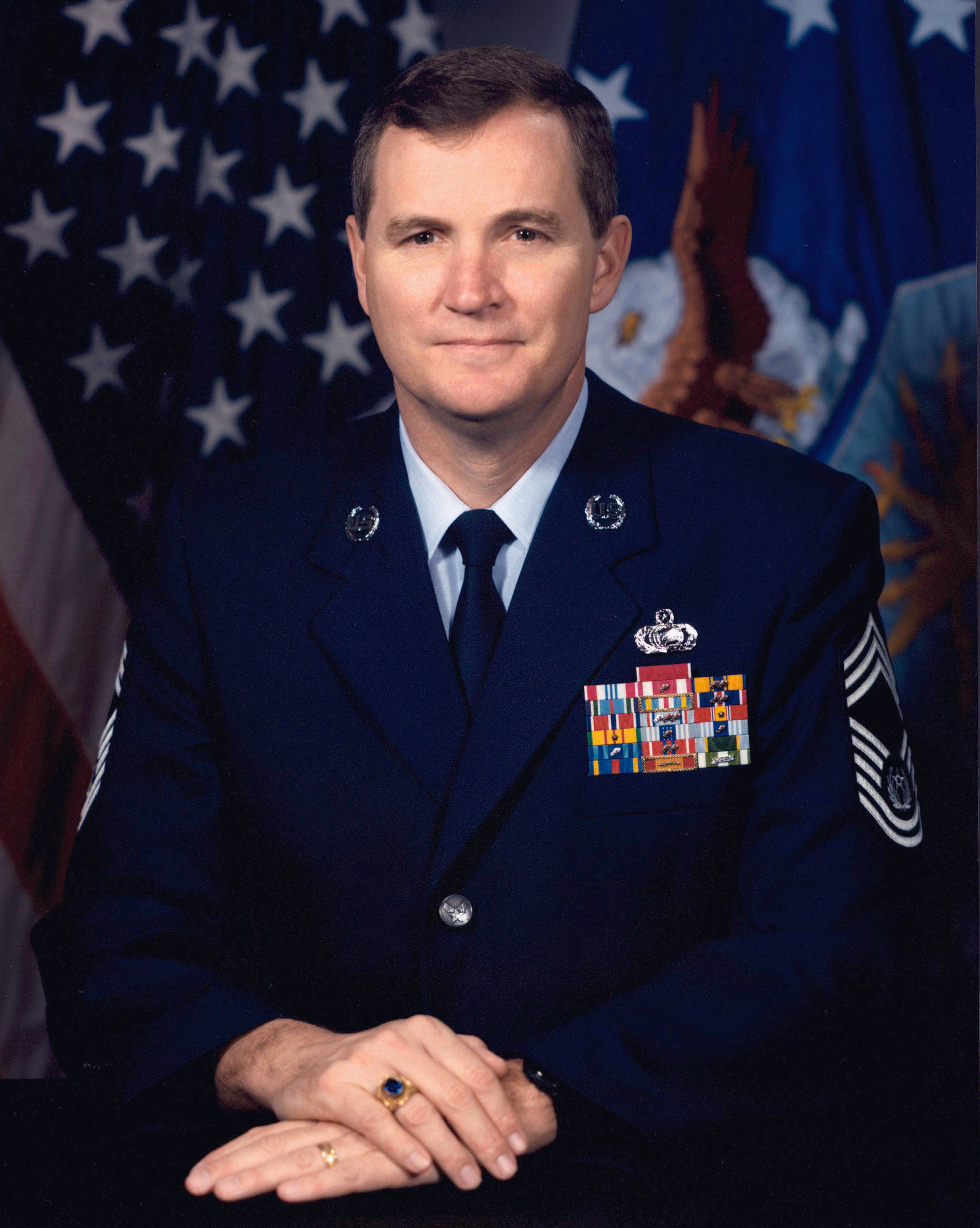
- Benken c. 1996
- Born: August 20, 1951 (age 75); Cincinnati, Ohio, US
- Military career
- Branch: United States Air Force
- Service years: 1970–1999
- Rank: Chief Master Sergeant of the Air Force
- Conflicts: Vietnam War
- Awards: Air Force Distinguished Service Medal; Legion of Merit; Defense Meritorious Service Medal; Meritorious Service Medal (2); Air Force Commendation Medal (3); Joint Service Achievement Medal

Eric W. Benken (born August 20, 1951) is a retired airman of the United States Air Force who served as the 12th Chief Master Sergeant of the Air Force from 1996 to 1999. He was the last Vietnam War veteran to hold the position.

== Military career ==
Benken was born in Cincinnati, Ohio, and entered the United States Air Force in March 1970. His background was in information management. He served in operational, maintenance and support units at every level of command from squadron through Major Command. Benken served in Taiwan, Korea, and South Vietnam, and in a joint service (NATO) assignment at Supreme Headquarters Allied Powers Europe (SHAPE). He served as Senior Enlisted Advisor to the Commanders of 12th Air Force and United States Air Forces in Europe (USAFE). During his tenure as USAFE Senior Enlisted Advisor and Chief Master Sergeant of the Air Force, the Air Force was involved in operations Northern Watch-Southern Watch (Iraq), Provide Promise (Bosnia), Provide Comfort (Iraq), Deliberate Force (Bosnia), Joint Endeavor in Bosnia and Herzegovina, Desert Fox (Iraq) and Allied Force (Kosovo).

Benken served as the Chief Master Sergeant of the Air Force from November 1996 to July 1999. In this role Benken was the senior enlisted advisor to General Ron Fogleman and General Michael E. Ryan, the respective Chief of Staff of the United States Air Force during his tenure. He also served Secretaries of the Air Force, Sheila Widnall and F. Whitten Peters. Benken's many initiatives included the development of the Command Chief Master Sergeant title (previously Senior Enlisted Advisor) and creation of a distinctive insignia; the implementation of Warrior Week at Basic Military Training; the successful fight against congressional efforts to interfere with gender integrated training at Basic Military Training; fighting for repeal of the 1986 40 percent retirement and creation of the NCO Professional Development Seminar. The Air Force Core Values of Integrity, Service Before Self and Excellence in All You Do were released in January 1997 in "The Little Blue Book." The development of the new Air Force Symbol began in 1998 to enhance recruiting and retention.

== Education ==
- 1977 Tactical Air Command Noncommissioned Officer Leadership School, Bergstrom Air Force Base, Texas
- 1986 Tactical Air Command Noncommissioned Officer Academy, Tyndall Air Force Base, Florida
- 1989 United States Air Force Senior Noncommissioned Officer Academy, Gunter Air Force Base, Alabama
- 1994 Associate degree in applied science, information management, Community College of the Air Force

== Assignments ==
1. March 1970 – April 1970, basic trainee, Basic Military Training, Lackland Air Force Base, Texas
2. May 1970 – December 1970, administrative specialist, 2578th Supply Squadron, Ellington Air Force Base, Texas
3. January 1971 – March 1972, administrative specialist, maintenance training section and maintenance quality control, 374th Tactical Airlift Wing, Ching Chuan Kang Air Base, Taiwan. Also deployed to Detachment 1, 834th Air Division, Tan Son Nhut Air Base, South Vietnam
4. April 1972 – September 1978, chief clerk, 67th Reconnaissance Technical Squadron and noncommissioned officer in charge, Director of Operations Administration, 67th Tactical Reconnaissance Wing, Bergstrom Air Force Base, Texas
5. October 1978 – October 1979, executive noncommissioned officer to the commander, 314th Air Division, Osan Air Base, South Korea
6. November 1979 – August 1983, NCOIC, Deputy Commander for Resources Administration and NCOIC, 12th Air Force Command Section, Bergstrom Air Force Base, Texas
7. September 1983 – December 1988, Chief, Administration Communications Division and NCOIC, Deputy Chief of Staff for Aircrew Training Devices Administration, United States Air Force Tactical Air Warfare Center, Eglin Air Force Base, Florida
8. January 1989 – July 1993, Superintendent, Manpower and Document Control Division, Office of the U. S. National Military Representative, and administrative officer, Assistant Chief of Staff Operations and Logistics Division, Supreme Headquarters Allied Powers Europe, Mons, Belgium
9. August 1993 – September 1994, Senior Enlisted Adviser to the Commander, 12th Air Force, Davis–Monthan Air Force Base, Arizona
10. October 1994 – October 1996, Senior Enlisted Adviser to the Commander, United States Air Forces in Europe, Ramstein Air Base, Germany
11. November 1996 – July 1999, Chief Master Sergeant of the Air Force, The Pentagon, Washington, D.C.

== Awards and decorations ==
Information Management Badge

Personal decorations
	Air Force Distinguished Service Medal
Width-44 crimson ribbon with a pair of width-2 white stripes on the edges	Legion of Merit
	Defense Meritorious Service Medal
Width-44 crimson ribbon with two width-8 white stripes at distance 4 from the edges.	Meritorious Service Medal with bronze oak leaf cluster
	Air Force Commendation Medal with two bronze oak leaf clusters
	Joint Service Achievement Medal
Unit awards
	Joint Meritorious Unit Award
	Air Force Outstanding Unit Award with Valor device and silver oak leaf cluster
	Air Force Organizational Excellence Award
Service awards
	Air Force Good Conduct Medal with silver and three bronze oak leaf clusters
Campaign and service medals
Width=44 scarlet ribbon with a central width-4 golden yellow stripe, flanked by pairs of width-1 scarlet, white, Old Glory blue, and white stripes	National Defense Service Medal with bronze service star
	Vietnam Service Medal with bronze service star
Service, training, and marksmanship awards
	Air Force Overseas Short Tour Service Ribbon with bronze oak leaf cluster
	Air Force Overseas Long Tour Service Ribbon with bronze oak leaf cluster
	Air Force Longevity Service Award with silver oak leaf cluster
	NCO Professional Military Education Graduate Ribbon with two bronze oak leaf clusters
	Small Arms Expert Marksmanship Ribbon
	Air Force Training Ribbon
Foreign awards
	Vietnam Gallantry Cross Unit Award
	Vietnam Campaign Medal

Military offices
Preceded by David J. Campanale	Chief Master Sergeant of the Air Force; 1996–1999	Succeeded by Frederick J. Finch
