= James M. McCoy =

Chief Master Sergeant of the USAF (1930–2022)

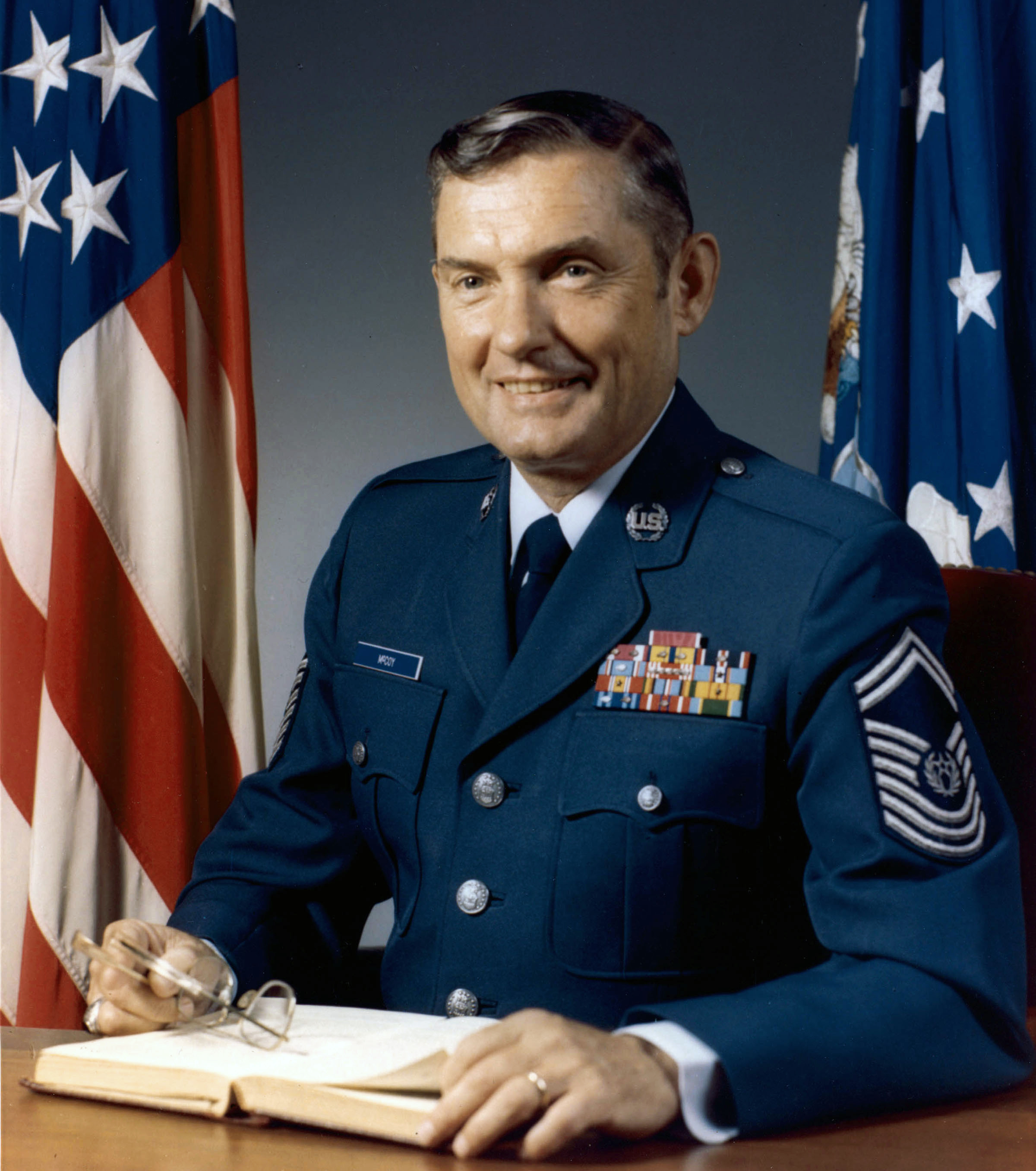
- McCoy c. 1979
- Born: July 30, 1930; Creston, Iowa, U.S.
- Died: July 13, 2022 (aged 91)
- Military career
- Branch: United States Air Force
- Service years: 1951–1981
- Rank: Chief Master Sergeant of the Air Force
- Unit: 8th Tactical Fighter Wing
- Conflicts: Vietnam War
- Awards: Legion of Merit; Meritorious Service Medal (3); Air Force Commendation Medal (3)

James Mark McCoy (July 30, 1930 – July 13, 2022) was the sixth Chief Master Sergeant of the Air Force, serving from 1979 to 1981.

== Early life ==
McCoy was born in Creston, Iowa, on July 30, 1930, and graduated from Maur Hill High School, Atchison, Kansas, in 1948.

== Military career ==
McCoy enlisted the United States Air Force in January 1951 after attending St. Benedict's College in Atchison and St. Ambrose College in Davenport, Iowa. He received a Bachelor of Science degree in business administration from Centenary College of Louisiana in 1966. He was an honor graduate of the Second Air Force Noncommissioned Officer Academy and graduated with the first class of the United States Air Force Senior Noncommissioned Officer Academy at Gunter Air Force Station, Alabama, in March 1973.

After basic training at Lackland Air Force Base, Texas, McCoy then attended radar operators school at Keesler Air Force Base, Mississippi. He was sent to 662d Aircraft Control and Warning Squadron at Apco, Ohio an by 1952 was an airman second class.

In 1956, technical sergeant McCoy, returned to Lackland to become an instructor in the basic military training program. In 1957 he transferred to Clark Air Base, Philippines, where he served as the base training noncommissioned officer for the 405th Fighter Wing. During the Taiwan crisis of August 1958 he was instrumental in establishing and operating the wing command post which coordinated all inbound combined Air Strike Force aircraft. In 1959 he was assigned as the assistant commandant of cadets, Air Force Reserve Officer Training Corps, Detachment 225, University of Notre Dame, in Indiana.

McCoy was assigned in 1960 as commandant, Strategic Air Command Noncommissioned Officer (NCO) Preparatory School, 305th Bombardment Wing, Bunker Hill Air Force Base. In 1961, he was promoted to master sergeant and a year later, he was selected as an instructor with the Second Air Force NCO Academy at Barksdale Air Force Base. He supervised the development of a proposed course of study for noncommissioned officer leadership schools. Prior to the academy's closure in 1966, he had become the academy's sergeant major and was promoted to senior master sergeant.

In April 1966, McCoy was assigned as chief, training branch, deputy chief of staff for personnel, Headquarters Second Air Force, where he was responsible for the command's on-the-job training and special training programs. He transferred to Headquarters Strategic Air Command in June 1967 where he was the noncommissioned officer professional military education monitor for the deputy chief of staff, personnel. While there, he established and monitored the SAC Noncommissioned Officer Academy and Noncommissioned Officer Leadership School programs. In 1968 he would be promoted to chief master sergeant.

In 1970, McCoy transferred to the 41st Aerospace Rescue and Recovery Wing, Hickam Air Force Base, Hawaii, as noncommissioned officer in charge of operations training. He supervised and monitored all training programs for the HH-3 Jolly Green Giant, HH-43 Huskie, HH-53 Super Jolly Green Giant and HC-130 Combat King aircraft crews assigned to wing units throughout the Pacific and Southeast Asia. As an additional duty, he served as senior enlisted adviser to the wing commander.

McCoy was assigned in April 1973 as chief, military training branch; deputy chief of staff, personnel; Headquarters Pacific Air Forces. He revitalized the on-the-job training program and represented the command at several worldwide conferences which helped improve Air Force-wide training programs. During this assignment, he was selected as one of the 12 Outstanding Airmen of the Air Force in 1974.

Returning to the Strategic Air Command in March 1975, McCoy became its first senior enlisted adviser. During this period he served as the personal representative of the commander in chief to the enlisted men and women of the command. In addition to traveling extensively throughout the command, he also served as chairman of two worldwide senior enlisted adviser conferences for the Air Force Association. Their efforts helped identify issues affecting quality of Air Force life. McCoy served in the position of Chief Master Sergeant of the Air Force from August 1979 to July 1981. In this role, McCoy was adviser to Secretary of the Air Force Hans Mark and Chief of Staff of the Air Force, General Lew Allen, on matters concerning welfare, effective utilization and progress of the enlisted members of the Air Force. His biggest challenge was improving the retention rates of new airmen and he worked to improve enlisted pay which was one of the largest complaints.

== Post-career ==
Active in many business and civic organizations, McCoy has served on several councils and board of directors in the Omaha, Nebraska-area and on the national level. He has served two terms as the Air Force Association national president and two terms as its chairman of the board.

McCoy died on July 13, 2022, at the age of 91.

== Awards and decorations ==
Personal decorations
Width-44 crimson ribbon with a pair of width-2 white stripes on the edges	Legion of Merit
Width-44 crimson ribbon with two width-8 white stripes at distance 4 from the edges.	Meritorious Service Medal with two bronze oak leaf clusters
	Air Force Commendation Medal with two bronze oak leaf clusters
Unit awards
	Air Force Outstanding Unit Award with bronze oak leaf cluster
Service awards
	Air Force Good Conduct Medal with silver and three bronze oak leaf clusters
	Army Good Conduct Medal
	Outstanding Airman of the Year Ribbon with bronze service star
Campaign and service medals
Width=44 scarlet ribbon with a central width-4 golden yellow stripe, flanked by pairs of width-1 scarlet, white, Old Glory blue, and white stripes	National Defense Service Medal with bronze service star
	Armed Forces Expeditionary Medal
	Vietnam Service Medal with bronze service star
Service, training, and marksmanship awards
	Air Force Longevity Service Award with silver and bronze oak leaf clusters
	NCO Professional Military Education Graduate Ribbon with bronze oak leaf cluster
	Small Arms Expert Marksmanship Ribbon
Foreign awards
	Vietnam Campaign Medal

=== Other achievements ===
- US Air Force Civilian Exceptional Service Medal
- US Air Force Recruiting Service America Spirit Award
- Air Force Association Presidential and Special Citations, Hoyt S. Vandenberg and Stortz Individual Membership Awards
- Boy Scouts of America District Award of Merit, Silver Beaver Award and Silver Antelope Award

=== Professional memberships and associations ===
- Permanent member, Air Force Association
- Board of Directors, Air Force Association
- Board of Directors, Airmen Memorial Foundation
- Chairman, Air Force Retiree Council
- Air Force Sergeants Association
- Aerospace Education Foundation
- American Legion
- Disabled American Veterans

Military offices
Preceded by Robert D. Gaylor	Chief Master Sergeant of the Air Force; 1979–1981	Succeeded by Arthur L. Andrews
