= CMSAF (disambiguation) =

CMSAF can refer to:

- Chief Master Sergeant of the Air Force, a rank in the United States Air Force
- Satellite Application Facility on Climate Monitoring (CM SAF), a European meteorological data centre hosted at Deutscher Wetterdienst
