= Donald L. Harlow =

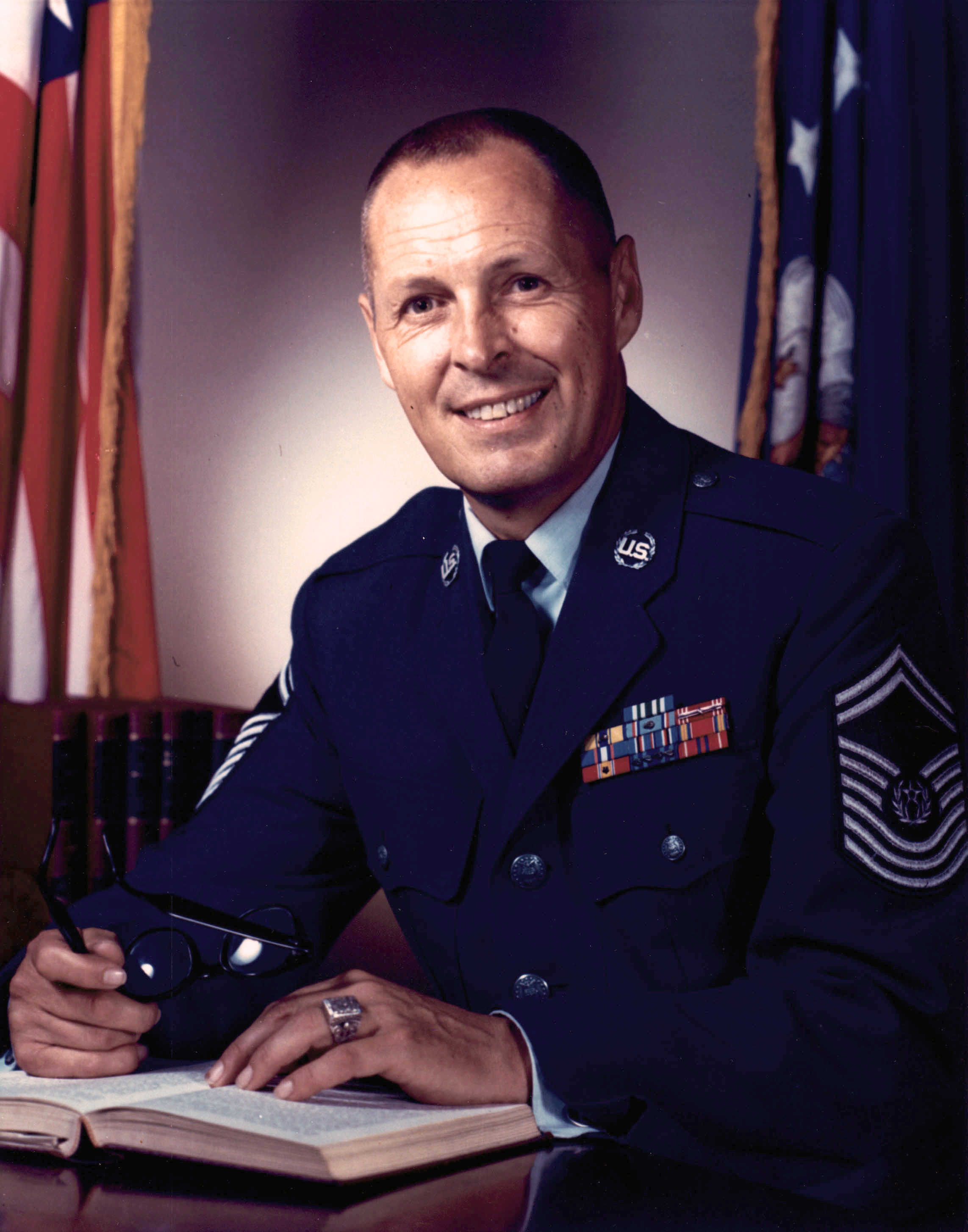
- Harlow c. 1969
- Born: September 22, 1920; Waterville, Maine, US
- Died: June 18, 1997 (aged 76); Andrews Air Force Base, Maryland, US
- Burial place: Arlington National Cemetery
- Military career
- Branch: United States Army Air Forces; United States Army Air Corps; United States Air Force
- Service years: 1942–1946; 1950–1971
- Rank: Chief Master Sergeant of the Air Force
- Conflicts: World War II
- Awards: Legion of Merit; Joint Service Commendation Medal; Air Force Commendation Medal (2)

Donald L. Harlow (September 22, 1920 – June 18, 1997) was a senior enlisted airman of the United States Air Force who served as the second Chief Master Sergeant of the Air Force from 1969 to 1971.

== Early life and education ==
Harlow born in Waterville, Maine, on September 22, 1920. He graduated from Lawrence Academy, Groton, Massachusetts, in 1942, and then attended California College of Commerce in Long Beach from 1946 to 1948. He was awarded a Bachelor of Science degree in business administration by the college in 1956, when he completed requirements while assigned to the Air Force Reserve Officer Training Corps program at Southern Methodist University.

== Military career ==
Harlow was drafted the United States Army in August 1942 during World War II and was assigned to the Army Air Forces. He attended basic training in Atlantic City, New Jersey. He attended armament school at Buckley Field, Colorado and upon completion was an instructor in the Aircraft Armament Ground School in Eagle Pass, Texas. In 1943, he was transferred to Matagorda Island teaching gunnery to new pilots.

He transferred to the personnel career field in 1945 and advanced to the grade of staff sergeant prior to his discharge from active duty in February 1946. He then became a member of the Air Force Reserve.

In August 1950, during the Korean War, Harlow was recalled to active duty and assigned as the personnel chief clerk, 5th and 9th Maintenance Squadrons, Travis Air Force Base, California. He was promoted to technical sergeant. In July 1951, he was promoted to master sergeant and volunteered for assignment to the 5th Air Division in Rabat, Morocco.

He would serve in Nevada, Texas and New Hampshire before being promoted to chief master sergeant in April 1963 after a total of 16 years active duty. He was the personnel sergeant major for Headquarters U.S. European Command and the sergeant major for the executive services division, Office of the Vice Chief of Staff of the United States Air Force in Washington, D.C.

He was named Outstanding Airman for Headquarters Command in 1967.

In August 1969 Harlow became the Chief Master Sergeant of the Air Force. In this role he was adviser to Secretary of the Air Force Robert C. Seamans Jr. and Chief of Staff of the Air Force, General John D. Ryan, on matters concerning welfare, effective utilization and progress of the enlisted members of the Air Force. He was the second chief master sergeant appointed to this ultimate noncommissioned officer position. He retired from the Air Force in September 1971.

== Later life ==
From 1971 through 1981, Harlow was the deputy for legislation for the Air Force Sergeants Association. He was primary spokesperson and legislative representative for the 146,000 member organization and its auxiliary. On May 20, 1980, he was inducted into the Military Order of the Sword by the enlisted men and women of the Tactical Air Command. He is the only enlisted person to receive this high honor. In 1982 Harlow was named executive director of the Air Force Sergeants Association. While holding this position he continued to be the association's primary spokesperson on legislative matters. He died on June 18, 1997.

== Assignments ==
1. August 1942 – October 1942, trainee, United States Air Force Basic Military Training, Atlantic City, New Jersey
2. October 1942 – January 1943, student, Armament School, Buckley Field, Colorado
3. June 1943 – September 1944, instructor, Aircraft Armament Ground School, Eagle Pass, Texas
4. September 1944 – September 1945, instructor, Aircraft Armament Ground School, Matagorda Island Air Force Base, Texas
5. September 1945 – February 1946, non-commissioned officer in charge, personnel processing, Foster Field, Texas
6. February 1946 – August 1950, Reserve status (inactive)
7. August 1950 – July 1951, recalled to active duty; personnel chief clerk, 5th and 9th Maintenance squadrons, Travis Air Force Base, California (temporary duty at Offutt Air Force Base, Nebraska, for special assignment to assist in formation of 5th Air Division)
8. July 1951 – July 1954, personnel sergeant major, 5th Air Division; custodian, NCO Club; non-commissioned officer in charge, special services; and steward, Officers Club, Rabat, Morocco
9. July 1954 – May 1955, personnel sergeant major, Air Force Reserve Officers' Training Corps Detachment 815, Southern Methodist University, Dallas, Texas; non-commissioned officer in charge, cadet training and AFROTC Summer Encampment, Harlingen Air Force Base, Texas.
10. May 1955 – August 1958, detachment sergeant major, 3635th Survival Training Wing, Stead Air Force Base, Nevada
11. August 1958 – April 1963, directorate of personnel, 317th Combat Support Group, Pease Air Force Base, New Hampshire (temporary duty as student, Strategic Air Command Non-Commissioned Officer Academy)
12. April 1963 – July 1965, personnel sergeant major, Air Force Element, Headquarters United States European Command, Camp des Loges, St. Germain, France
13. July 1965 – July 1969, sergeant major, executive services division, Office of the Vice Chief of Staff, Headquarters United States Air Force, Washington, D.C.
14. August 1969 – September 1971, Chief Master Sergeant of the Air Force, Headquarters United States Air Force, Washington, D.C.

== Awards and decorations ==
Personal decorations
Width-44 crimson ribbon with a pair of width-2 white stripes on the edges	Legion of Merit
	Joint Service Commendation Medal
	Air Force Commendation Medal with bronze oak leaf cluster
Service awards
	Air Force Good Conduct Medal with bronze oak leaf cluster
	Army Good Conduct Medal with two Good Conduct Loops
	Outstanding Airman of the Year Ribbon
Campaign and service medals
	American Campaign Medal
	World War II Victory Medal
	National Defense Service Medal with bronze service star
Service, training, and marksmanship awards
	Air Force Longevity Service Award with four bronze oak leaf clusters
	NCO Professional Military Education Graduate Ribbon

=== Other achievements ===
- Strategic Air Command NCO Academy, Student Commander Trophy, Gold Key for Academic Achievement, and The Drill and Ceremonies Military Achievement Award
- 1967 Headquarters Command Outstanding Airman of the Year

=== Professional memberships and associations ===
- Member, USAF Retiree Council
- Member, Air Force Association
- Chairman, Richard D. Kisling Scholarship Fund Committee

Military offices
Preceded by Paul W. Airey	Chief Master Sergeant of the Air Force; 1969–1971	Succeeded by Richard D. Kisling
