= James C. Binnicker =

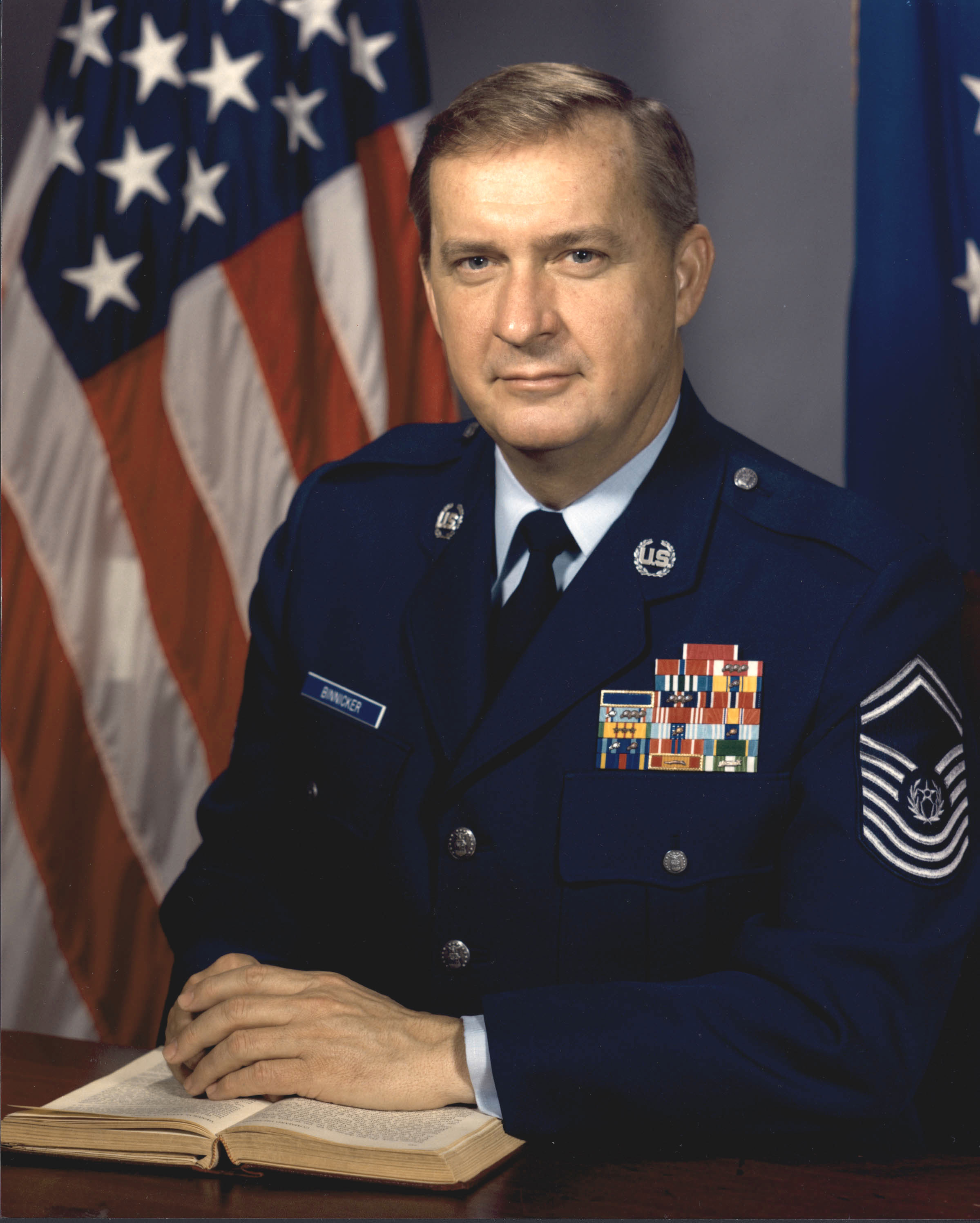
- Binnicker c. 1986
- Born: July 23, 1938; Orangeburg, South Carolina, US
- Died: March 21, 2015 (aged 76); Calhoun, Georgia, US
- Burial place: Arlington National Cemetery
- Military career
- Branch: United States Air Force
- Service years: 1957–1990
- Rank: Chief Master Sergeant of the Air Force
- Conflicts: Vietnam War
- Awards: Air Force Distinguished Service Medal; Legion of Merit; Bronze Star Medal; Meritorious Service Medal (4); Joint Service Commendation Medal; Air Force Commendation Medal (2)
- Other work: CEO Air Force Enlisted Village

James C. Binnicker (July 23, 1938 – March 21, 2015) was a senior enlisted non-commissioned officer in the United States Air Force who served as the 9th Chief Master Sergeant of the Air Force from 1986 to 1990.

== Early life ==
James Binnicker was born on July 23, 1938, in Orangeburg, South Carolina, where he graduated from Aiken High School in 1956.

== Military career ==
Binnicker entered the United States Air Force in August 1957. His first assignment was to the 96th Air Refueling Squadron, Altus Air Force Base, Oklahoma, as a life support specialist. His early years include tours in base and wing operations in Hawaii, North Dakota, Georgia, North Carolina, Vietnam, and Taiwan. He served as the Senior Enlisted Advisor for 12th Air Force, Headquarters Pacific Air Forces, and Headquarters Tactical Air Command. He also represented the Air Force as Senior Enlisted Advisor on the President's Commission on Military Compensation. In February 1985, Binnicker was selected for the 33-year extended tenure program.

Binnicker served as the Chief Master Sergeant of the Air Force from July 1, 1986, to July 1990.

== Later life ==
In March 2000, Binnicker was appointed the president and CEO of the Air Force Enlisted Village (AFEV), a non-profit charity located in Shalimar, Florida, that provides a home for the surviving spouses of enlisted military personnel. Binnicker was a member of the AFEV Board of Directors from 1992 to his death. He died in 2015, aged 76, and is buried at Arlington National Cemetery.

== Assignments ==
1. August 1957, trainee, United States Air Force Basic Military Training, Lackland Air Force Base, Texas
2. September 1957 – 1963, life support specialist, 96th Air Refueling Squadron, Altus Air Force Base, Oklahoma
3. 1963 – July 1964, air operations specialist, 816th Strategic Aerospace Division, Altus Air Force Base, Oklahoma
4. July 1964 – August 1967, noncommissioned officer in charge, wing operations, 1502d Air Transport Wing (later became 61st Military Airlift Wing), Hickam Air Force Base, Hawaii
5. August 1967 – August 1968, noncommissioned officer in charge, base operations, 4th Strategic Aerospace Division, Grand Forks Air Force Base, North Dakota
6. August 1968 – September 1969, noncommissioned officer in charge, base operations, 22d Tactical Air Support Training Squadron, Binh Thuy Air Base, Republic of Vietnam; and language instructor, Republic of Vietnam Armed Forces Language School, Ho Chi Minh City, Saigon.
7. September 1969 – May 1971, air operations superintendent, 58th Military Airlift Squadron, Robins Air Force Base, Georgia.
8. May 1971 – August 1972, noncommissioned officer in charge, wing operations, 374th Tactical Airlift Wing, Ching Chuan Kang Air Base, Taiwan.
9. August 1972 – December 1973, operations superintendent, base sergeant major and wing senior enlisted adviser, 4th Tactical Fighter Wing, Seymour Johnson Air Force Base, North Carolina
10. December 1973 - July 1975 senior enlisted adviser, Ninth Air Force, 9th Air Force, Shaw Air Force Base South Carolina.
11. July 1975 – June 1978, senior enlisted adviser, Twelfth Air Force, 12th Air Force, Bergstrom Air Force Base, Texas.
12. June 1978 – Jun 1981, senior enlisted adviser to the commander in chief, Headquarters Pacific Air Forces, Hickam Air Force Base, Hawaii.
13. June 1981 – May 1982, chief, enlisted retention division, Headquarters Manpower and Personnel Center, Randolph Air Force Base, Texas.
14. May 1982 – May 1985, assistant for chief master sergeant matters, Headquarters Manpower and Personnel Center, Randolph Air Force Base, Texas.
15. May 1985 – July 1986, senior enlisted adviser to the commander, Headquarters Tactical Air Command, Langley Air Force Base, Virginia.
16. July 1986 – July 1990, Chief Master Sergeant of the Air Force, The Pentagon, Washington, D.C.

== Awards and decorations ==
Personal decorations
	Air Force Distinguished Service Medal
Width-44 crimson ribbon with a pair of width-2 white stripes on the edges	Legion of Merit
Width-44 scarlet ribbon with width-4 ultramarine blue stripe at center, surrounded by width-1 white stripes. Width-1 white stripes are at the edges.	Bronze Star Medal
Width-44 crimson ribbon with two width-8 white stripes at distance 4 from the edges.	Meritorious Service Medal with three bronze oak leaf clusters
	Joint Service Commendation Medal
	Air Force Commendation Medal with bronze oak leaf cluster
Unit awards
	Presidential Unit Citation
	Air Force Outstanding Unit Award with Valor device and silver oak leaf cluster
	Air Force Organizational Excellence Award
Service awards
	Air Force Good Conduct Medal with silver and two bronze oak leaf clusters
	Army Good Conduct Medal
Campaign and service medals
Width=44 scarlet ribbon with a central width-4 golden yellow stripe, flanked by pairs of width-1 scarlet, white, Old Glory blue, and white stripes	National Defense Service Medal
	Vietnam Service Medal with three bronze service stars
Service, training, and marksmanship awards
	Air Force Overseas Short Tour Service Ribbon
	Air Force Overseas Long Tour Service Ribbon with bronze oak leaf cluster
	Air Force Longevity Service Award with silver and bronze oak leaf clusters
	NCO Professional Military Education Graduate Ribbon with two bronze oak leaf clusters
	Small Arms Expert Marksmanship Ribbon
	Air Force Training Ribbon
Foreign awards
	Vietnam Gallantry Cross Unit Award
	Vietnam Campaign Medal

Military offices
Preceded by Sam E. Parish	Chief Master Sergeant of the Air Force; 1986–1990	Succeeded by Gary R. Pfingston
