= Gary R. Pfingston =

Chief Master Sergeant of the United States Air Force

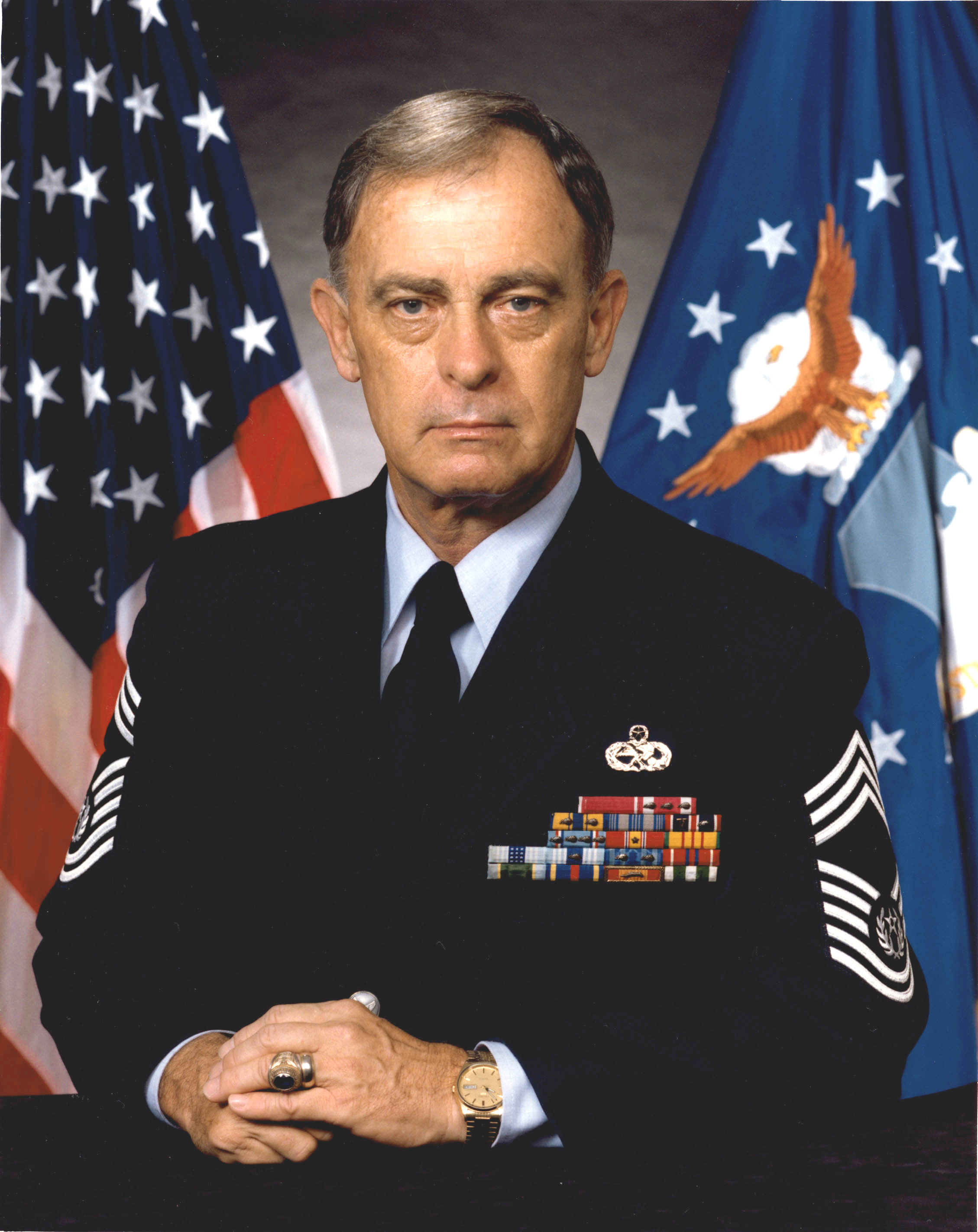
- Pfingston c. 1990
- Born: January 2, 1940; Evansville, Indiana, US
- Died: June 23, 2007 (aged 67); San Antonio, Texas, US
- Military career
- Branch: United States Air Force
- Service years: 1962–1994
- Rank: Chief Master Sergeant of the Air Force
- Conflicts: Vietnam War
- Awards: Air Force Distinguished Service Medal; Legion of Merit; Meritorious Service Medal (4); Air Force Commendation Medal (3); Air Force Achievement Medal

Gary R. Pfingston (January 2, 1940 – June 23, 2007) was an airman in the United States Air Force who served as the 10th Chief Master Sergeant of the Air Force from 1990 to 1994.

== Early life ==
Pfingston was born in Evansville, Indiana, on January 2, 1940. In California, he graduated from Torrance High School in 1958 and attended El Camino College from 1958 through 1961.

== Military career ==
Pfingston entered the United States Air Force in February 1962. He spent his early years as a B-52 Crew Chief at Castle Air Force Base, California from 1962 to 1968 and then worked on B-52s and KC-135s at Plattsburgh Air Force Base, New York from 1968 to 1972. After serving in Thailand at U-Tapao Royal Thai Air Base between 1972 and 1973, he became a military Training Instructor at Lackland Air Force Base in 1973. In 1979 he became Commandant of the Military Training Instructor School. Promoted first sergeant in 1982, he was then between 1984 and 1990 a Senior Enlisted Advisor at George Air Force Base, California; Bergstrom Air Force Base, Texas; and Pacific Air Forces Headquarters, Hickam Air Force Base, Hawaii.

On August 1, 1990, Pfingston was appointed Chief Master Sergeant of the Air Force. Pfingston's focus during his tenure was tackling the Air Force's draw-down and decreasing budget. After Basic Allowance for Subsistence (BAS) issues arose during increased deployments during the Gulf War, he worked to continue BAS for Airmen living in field conditions and toward increasing Servicemen's Group Life Insurance (SGLI) amounts. His toughest challenge was Air Force downsizing. With a goal of avoiding involuntary separations during the ongoing force draw-down, he worked to get the Voluntary Separation Incentive and Special Separation Bonus programs established. He retired on October 25, 1994, and died of cancer on June 23, 2007.

== Awards and decorations ==
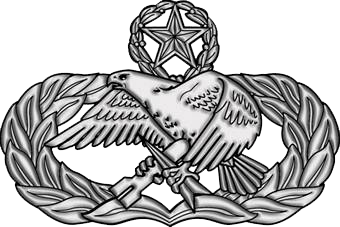
Master Maintenance Badge

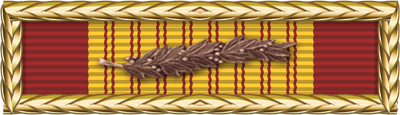
Air Force Distinguished Service Medal
Legion of Merit
Meritorious Service Medal with three bronze oak leaf clusters
Air Force Commendation Medal with two bronze oak leaf clusters
Air Force Achievement Medal
Air Force Outstanding Unit Award with Valor device and silver oak leaf cluster
Air Force Good Conduct Medal with silver and three bronze oak leaf clusters
National Defense Service Medal with service star
Vietnam Service Medal
Air Force Overseas Short Tour Service Ribbon
Air Force Overseas Long Tour Service Ribbon with bronze oak leaf cluster
Air Force Longevity Service Award with silver and bronze oak leaf clusters
NCO Professional Military Education Graduate Ribbon with two oak leaf clusters
Small Arms Expert Marksmanship Ribbon
Air Force Training Ribbon
Vietnam Gallantry Cross Unit Award
Vietnam Campaign Medal

Military offices
Preceded by James C. Binnicker	Chief Master Sergeant of the Air Force; 1990–1994	Succeeded by David J. Campanale
