= Robert Gaylor =

Chief Master Sergeant of the US Air Force (1977–1979)

Robert D. Gaylor
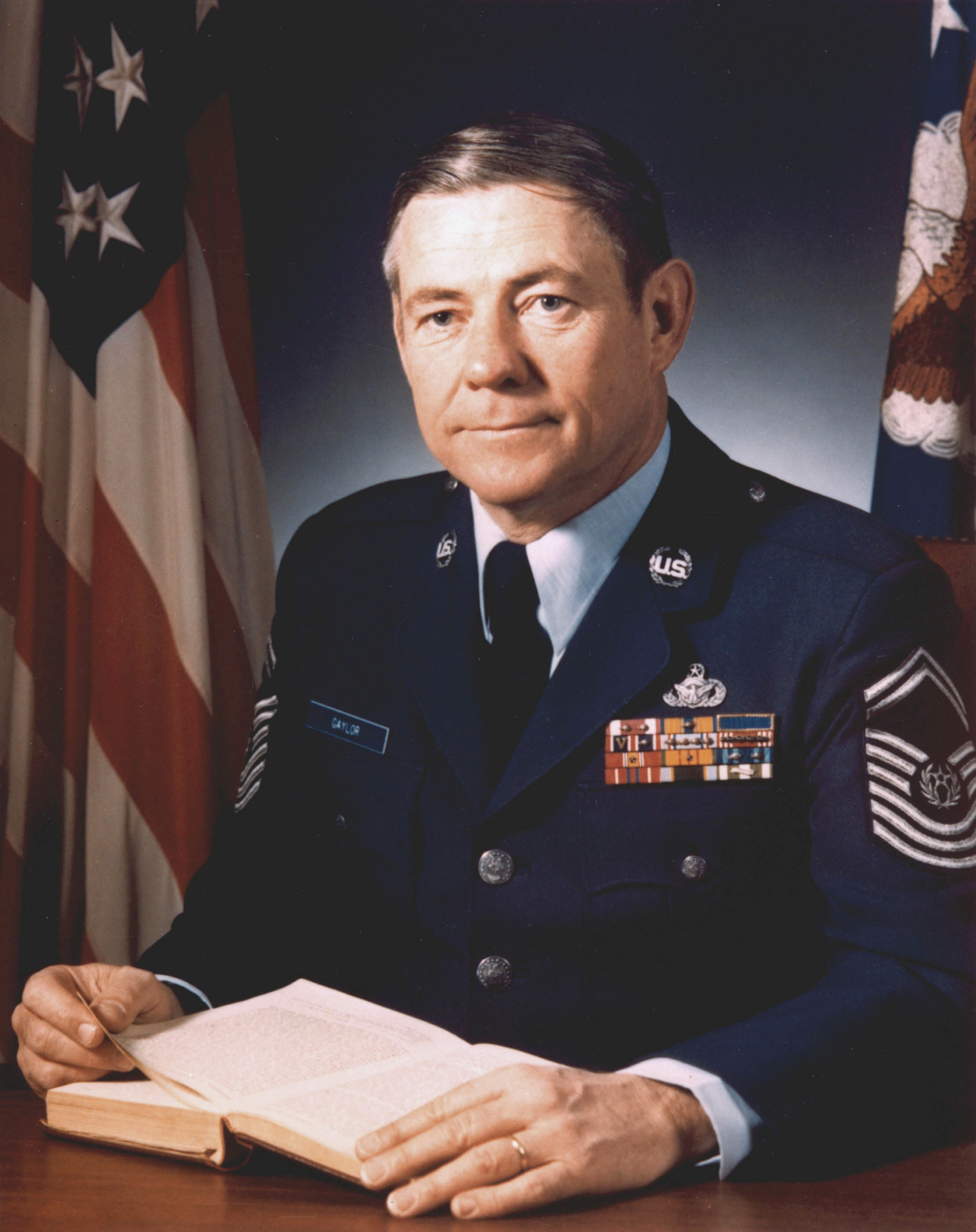
- Gaylor c. 1977
- Born: May 8, 1930; Bellevue, Iowa, U.S.
- Died: January 17, 2024 (aged 93)
- Military career
- Branch: United States Air Force
- Service years: 1948–1979
- Rank: Chief Master Sergeant of the Air Force
- Unit: 8th Tactical Fighter Wing
- Conflicts: Vietnam War
- Awards: Legion of Merit; Meritorious Service Medal (3); Air Force Commendation Medal (2)

Robert D. Gaylor (May 8, 1930 – January 17, 2024) was an American military senior non-commissioned officer, the 5th Chief Master Sergeant of the U.S. Air Force from 1977 to 1979.

== Early life ==
Gaylor was born on May 8, 1930, in Bellevue, Iowa; however, most of his youth was spent in Indiana.

== Military career ==
Gaylor enlisted in the United States Air Force in September 1948 and chose the security police career field upon arriving at Waco Air Base, Texas. He then attended army military police school at Camp Gordon, Georgia because the Air Force didn't have its own school yet. In September 1951, newly promoted staff sergeant Gaylor reenlisted. In 1952, he was transferred to Laredo Air Force Base, Texas and while there was promoted to technical sergeant (1953) and master sergeant (1956). Upon leaving Laredo in 1956, he went to Kunsan Air Base, Korea for a year.

In September 1957 he served as a military training instructor at Lackland Air Force Base, Texas, until February 1962. While an instructor he became the senior training NCO for a Women in the Air Force (WAF) squadron.

He then returned to the security police field in 1962 in Tachikawa Air Base, Japan and was promoted to senior master sergeant. Gaylor would go to Columbus Air Force Base, Mississippi and attend the NCO Academy at Barksdale Air Force Base, Louisiana. He was an honor graduate of Class 65B of the Second Air Force Noncommissioned Officer (NCO) Academy at Barksdale Air Force Base. After graduation in April 1965 he was selected to be an instructor at the academy and taught there until it closed in April 1966.

Following a security police tour at Korat Royal Thai Air Force Base, Thailand, Gaylor returned to Barksdale and assisted in reopening the SAC NCO Academy. In February 1970 he became senior enlisted adviser for Second Air Force. In July 1971 Gaylor transferred to Headquarters United States Air Forces in Europe (USAFE), where he traveled to USAFE teaching management techniques. In June 1972 he established the USAFE Command Management and Leadership Center, an in-residence, 60-hour course of instruction for USAFE NCOs. He continued as noncommissioned officer in charge of the center until his selection as USAFE Senior Enlisted Adviser in August 1973. In September 1974 Gaylor was assigned to the Air Force Military Personnel Center, where he traveled extensively as a management and leadership instructor. He became chief master sergeant of the Air Force in 1977 and retired July 31, 1979.

Gaylor was appointed Chief Master Sergeant of the Air Force in 1977. In this role he was adviser to Secretary of the Air Force John C. Stetson and Chiefs of Staff of the Air Force, General David C. Jones and General Lew Allen, on matters concerning welfare, effective utilization and progress of the enlisted members of the Air Force. He was the fifth chief master sergeant appointed to this ultimate noncommissioned officer position.

== Later life ==
After retiring from the Air Force, Gaylor taught, coached, and mentored leaders at all levels for USAA, a Fortune 500 company. In 2006, the NCO academy at Lackland Air Force Base was named the Robert D. Gaylor NCO Academy in his honor.

Robert Gaylor died on January 17, 2024, at the age of 93.

== Awards and decorations ==
Security Police Qualification Badge

Personal decorations
Width-44 crimson ribbon with a pair of width-2 white stripes on the edges	Legion of Merit
	Meritorious Service Medal with two bronze oak leaf clusters
	Air Force Commendation Medal with bronze oak leaf cluster
Unit awards
	Presidential Unit Citation
	Air Force Outstanding Unit Award with Valor device and silver oak leaf cluster
Service awards
	Air Force Good Conduct Medal with silver and three bronze oak leaf clusters
	Army Good Conduct Medal with four Good Conduct Loops
Campaign and service medals
	National Defense Service Medal with bronze service star
	Vietnam Service Medal with bronze service star
Service, training, and marksmanship awards
	Air Force Longevity Service Award with silver and bronze oak leaf cluster
	NCO Professional Military Education Graduate Ribbon with bronze oak leaf cluster
	Small Arms Expert Marksmanship Ribbon with bronze service star
Foreign awards
	Vietnam Campaign Medal

Awarded but not worn as the CMSAF

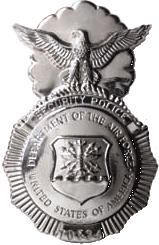
Air Force Security Forces Badge

Military offices
Preceded by Thomas N. Barnes	Chief Master Sergeant of the Air Force; 1977–1979	Succeeded by James M. McCoy
