= Gerald R. Murray =

US Air Force airman (born 1956)

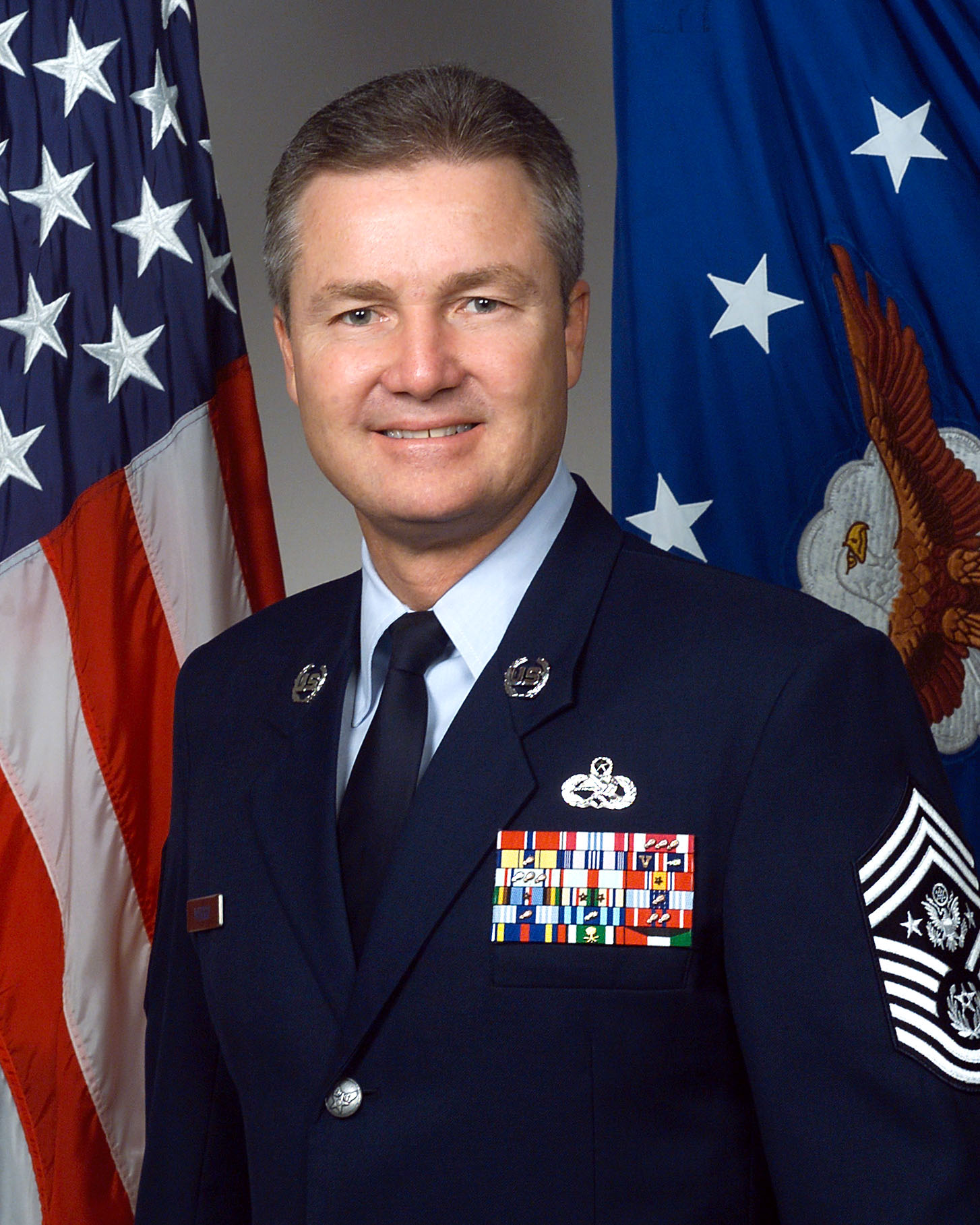
- Murray c. 2002
- Born: January 18, 1956 (age 70); Boiling Springs, North Carolina, US
- Military career
- Branch: United States Air Force
- Service years: 1977–2006
- Rank: Chief Master Sergeant of the Air Force
- Conflicts: Gulf War; Operation Southern Watch
- Awards: Air Force Distinguished Service Medal; Bronze Star Medal; Defense Meritorious Service Medal; Meritorious Service Medal (4); Air Force Commendation Medal (2); Air Force Achievement Medal

Gerald R. Murray (born January 18, 1956) is a retired airman of the United States Air Force who served as the 14th Chief Master Sergeant of the Air Force from 2002 to 2006.

== Military career ==
Murray grew up in Boiling Springs, North Carolina, and entered the United States Air Force in October 1977. His background includes various duties in aircraft maintenance and as a Command Chief Master Sergeant at wing, numbered air force and major command levels. His assignments include bases in Florida, South Carolina, Washington and Georgia. Murray also served overseas in Turkey and Japan, and deployed in support of operations Desert Storm and Southern Watch. Before becoming Chief Master Sergeant of the Air Force, he served as Command Chief Master Sergeant, Pacific Air Forces, Hickam Air Force Base, Hawaii.

Murray was appointed to the position of Chief Master Sergeant of the Air Force on July 1, 2002. In this position, he represented the highest enlisted level of leadership, and as such, provides direction for the enlisted corps and represents their interests, as appropriate, to the American public, and to those in all levels of government. He serves as the personal adviser to the Chief of Staff and the Secretary of the Air Force on all issues regarding the welfare, readiness, morale, and proper utilization and progress of the enlisted force.

Murray retired on October 1, 2006, after 29 years of service.

== Post military career ==
Murray served as Chairman of the Board of the Air & Space Forces Association.

== Education ==
- 1983 Tactical Air Command Noncommissioned Officer Leadership School, Shaw AFB, SC.
- 1984 U.S. Air Forces in Europe Noncommissioned Officer Academy, Kapaun Air Station, West Germany
- 1986 Associate in Applied Science degree in aircraft systems maintenance technology, Community College of the Air Force
- 1987 Associate of Arts degree in liberal arts, Saint Leo College, Saint Leo, Fl.
- 1993 Senior Noncommissioned Officer Academy, Gunter AFB, Al.

== Assignments ==
1. October 1977 – December 1977, trainee, Basic Military Training, Lackland AFB, Texas
2. December 1977 – February 1978, student, Aircraft Maintenance Technology Course, Sheppard AFB, Texas
3. February 1978 – October 1981, aircraft crew chief, 13th Fighter Squadron, 56th Tactical Fighter Wing, MacDill AFB, Fla.
4. October 1981 – April 1984, aircraft maintenance instructor, 363rd Tactical Fighter Wing, Shaw AFB, S.C.
5. April 1984 – May 1986, senior F-16 Fighting Falcon crew chief, 39th Consolidated Maintenance Squadron, Incirlik Air Base, Turkey
6. May 1986 – July 1992, aircraft production superintendent, 353rd Aircraft Maintenance Unit, 354th Fighter Wing, Myrtle Beach AFB, S.C. (August 1990 March 1991, production superintendent, 354th Wing [Provisional], King Fahd International Airport and King Khalid Military City, Saudi Arabia)
7. July 1992 – December 1994, Superintendent, Maintenance Flight, 354th Fighter Squadron, McChord AFB, Wash.
8. December 1994 – April 1996, Maintenance Superintendent, 70th Fighter Squadron, 347th Wing, Moody AFB, Ga. (December 1995 March 1996, Maintenance Superintendent, 70th Fighter Squadron, Al Jaber AB, Kuwait)
9. April 1996 – August 1999, Command Chief Master Sergeant, 347th Wing, Moody AFB, Ga. (November 1997 March 1998, Command Chief Master Sergeant, 347th Wing (Provisional) Sheikh Isa AB, Bahrain)
10. September 1999 – August 2001, Command Chief Master Sergeant, U.S. Forces Japan and 5th Air Force, Yokota AB, Japan
11. August 2001 – June 2002, Command Chief Master Sergeant, Pacific Air Forces, Hickam AFB, Hawaii
12. July 2002 – June 2006, Chief Master Sergeant of the Air Force, The Pentagon, Washington, D.C.

== Awards and decorations ==
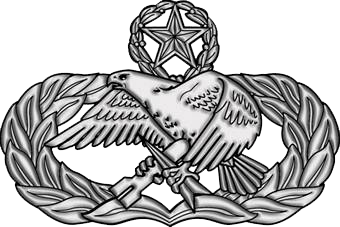
Master Maintenance Badge

Air Force Distinguished Service Medal
Bronze Star Medal
Defense Meritorious Service Medal
Meritorious Service Medal with three bronze oak leaf clusters
Air Force Commendation Medal with bronze oak leaf cluster
Air Force Achievement Medal
Air Force Outstanding Unit Award with Valor device and silver oak leaf cluster
Air Force Good Conduct Medal with silver and three bronze oak leaf clusters
Air Force Recognition Ribbon
National Defense Service Medal with bronze service star
Armed Forces Expeditionary Medal with bronze service star
Southwest Asia Service Medal with two bronze service stars
Air Force Overseas Short Tour Service Ribbon with bronze oak leaf cluster
Air Force Overseas Long Tour Service Ribbon with bronze oak leaf cluster
Air Force Longevity Service Award with silver and bronze oak leaf cluster
NCO Professional Military Education Graduate Ribbon with two bronze oak leaf clusters
Small Arms Expert Marksmanship Ribbon
Air Force Training Ribbon
Kuwait Liberation Medal (Saudi Arabia)
Kuwait Liberation Medal (Kuwait)

== Other Achievements ==
- 1983 Honor graduate and Communicative Skills Award, Noncommissioned Officer Leadership School
- 1985 Distinguished graduate, Noncommissioned Officer Academy
- 1991 Air Force General Lew Allen Trophy, for outstanding performance in aircraft sortie generation.
- 1993 Distinguished graduate, Senior Noncommissioned Officer Academy

Military offices
Preceded by Frederick J. Finch	Chief Master Sergeant of the Air Force; 2002–2006	Succeeded by Rodney J. McKinley
