= Western Brown High School =

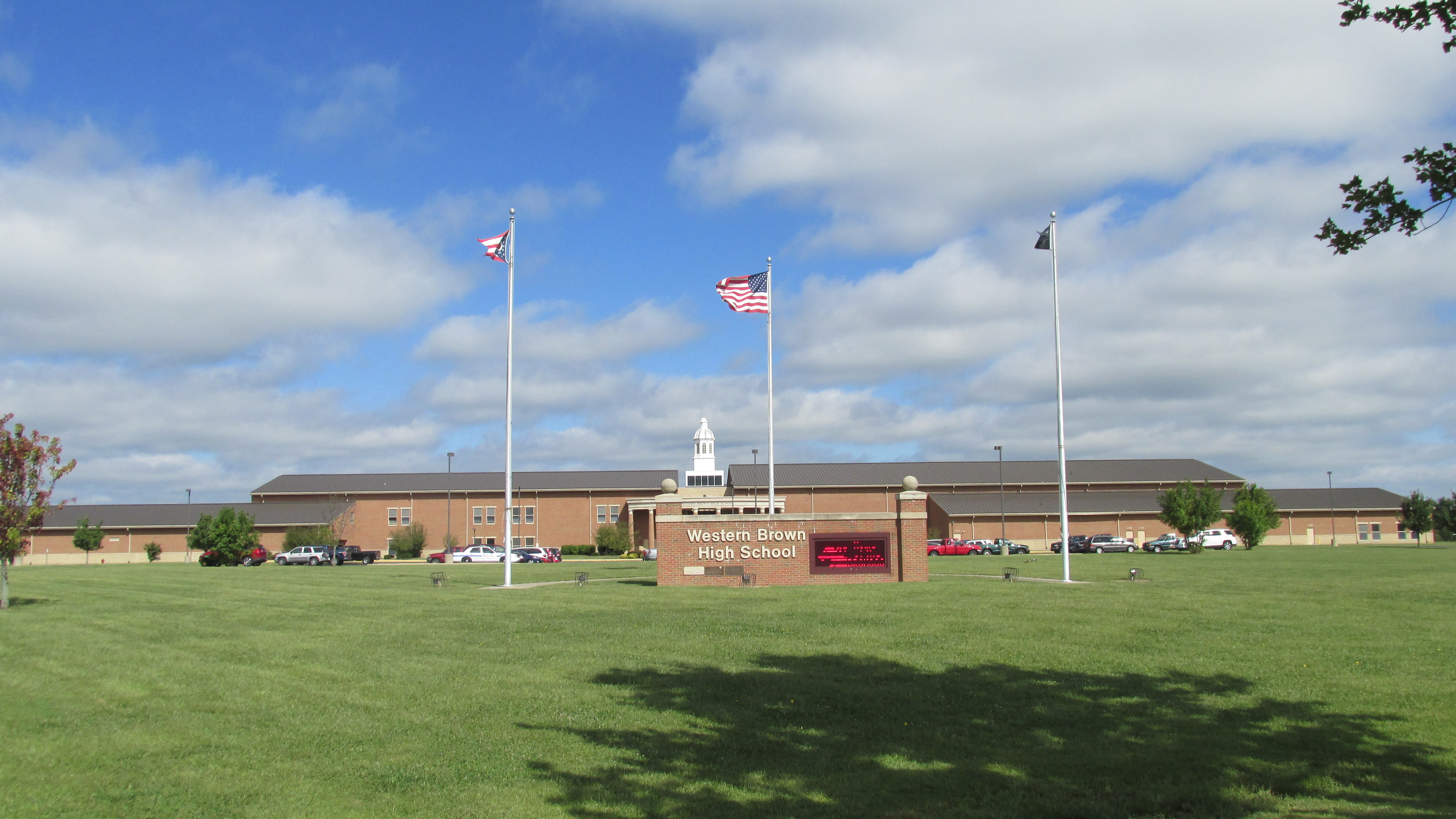

Location
- West Main Street; Mount Orab, Brown County, Ohio 45154; United States
- Coordinates: 39°2′3″N 83°56′17″W

Information
- Type: Public, Coeducational high school
- Established: 1973
- Superintendent: Raegan White
- Principal: Heather Cooper
- Colors: Brown and gold
- Athletics: Baseball, basketball, cross country, football, JROTC, soccer, softball, tennis, track, volleyball, wrestling, golf, marching band, academic team, bowling
- Athletics conference: Southern Buckeye Athletic/Academic Conference
- Mascot: Bronco
- Team name: Broncos
- Website: www.wb.k12.oh.us

Western Brown High School is a public secondary school located in Mount Orab, Ohio. It is the only high school in the Western Brown Local Schools District. Its mascot is the Bronco.

== Notable alumni ==
- Rodney J. McKinley (born 1956), 15th Chief Master Sergeant of the Air Force.
