= Frederick J. Finch =

13th Chief Master Sergeant of the Air Force

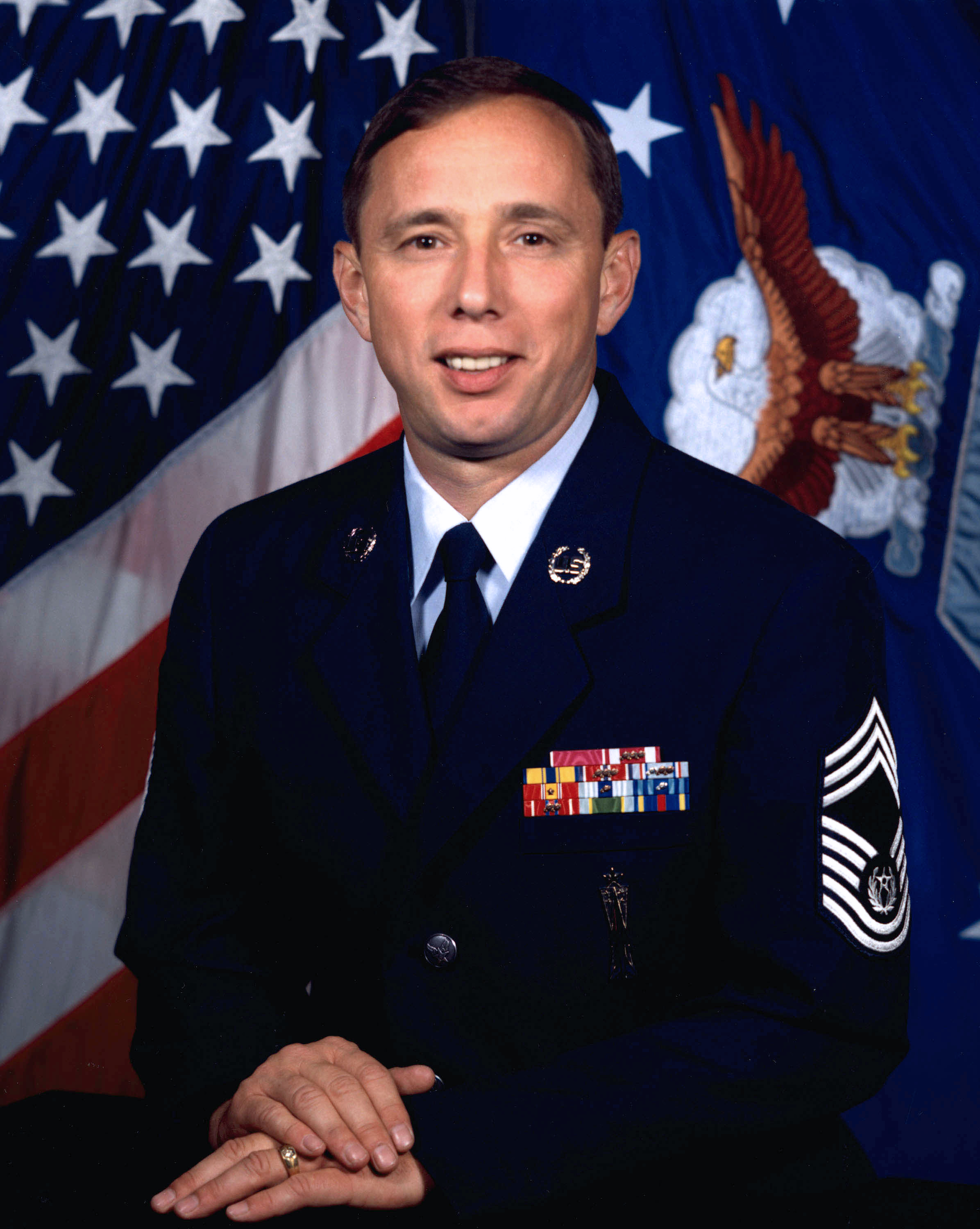
- Finch c. 1999
- Born: July 29, 1956 (age 70)
- Military career
- Branch: United States Air Force
- Service years: 1974–2002
- Rank: Chief Master Sergeant of the Air Force
- Awards: Air Force Distinguished Service Medal; Legion of Merit; Meritorious Service Medal (4); Air Force Commendation Medal

Frederick J. "Jim" Finch (born July 29, 1956) is a retired Chief Master Sergeant of the United States Air Force who served as the 13th Chief Master Sergeant of the Air Force from 1999 to 2002.

== Military career ==
Finch grew up in East Hampton, New York, and entered the United States Air Force in July 1974. His background was in missile maintenance and professional military education and he served in a number of operational, maintenance, and support units at every level of command, from squadron through Major Command. His assignments included bases in Colorado, Florida, Alabama, Texas, Virginia, and Washington, D.C. He served overseas in the United Kingdom and Alaska. Finch served as the Command Chief Master Sergeant for the 11th Air Force and Air Combat Command (ACC). While at ACC, the command was involved in operations such as Operation Provide Promise, Operation Northern Watch, Operation Southern Watch, Operation Deliberate Force, Operation Joint Endeavor, Operation Desert Fox, and Operation Allied Force.

== Assignments ==
1. July 1974 – September 1974, student, Air Force basic military training, Lackland Air Force Base, TX
2. September 1974 – February 1975, student, Missile Maintenance Technician School, Lowry Air Force Base, CO
3. March 1975 – November 1976, missile maintenance technician, 31st Munitions Maintenance Squadron, Homestead Air Reserve Base, FL
4. November 1976 – July 1978, missile maintenance technician, 7551st Ammunition Supply Squadron, Royal Air Force Welford, England
5. July 1978 – April 1980, missile maintenance crew chief and shift supervisor, 31st Equipment Maintenance Squadron, Homestead Air Reserve Base, FL
6. April 1980 – October 1984, instructor and Director of Education, Tactical Air Command Noncommissioned Officer Professional Military Education Center, Homestead Air Reserve Base, FL
7. October 1984 – June 1988, Chief, Nonresident Course Development; Director, Noncommissioned Officer Preparatory Course Instructor Course; and Chief, Noncommissioned Officer Professional Military Education Evaluations and Analysis Branch, Leadership and Management Development Center, Center for Professional Development, Maxwell Air Force Base, AL
8. June 1988 – August 1992, Superintendent for Noncommissioned Officer Professional Military Education, Air Force Military Personnel Center, Randolph Air Force Base, TX
9. September 1992 – July 1993, Commandant, Pacific Air Forces Noncommissioned Officer Academy — Alaska, Elmendorf Air Force Base, AK
10. July 1993 – July 1995, Senior Enlisted Adviser, 11th Air Force, Elmendorf Air Force Base, AK
11. July 1995 – July 1999, Command Chief Master Sergeant, Air Combat Command, Langley Air Force Base, VA
12. August 1999 – June 2002, Chief Master Sergeant of the Air Force, The Pentagon, Washington, D.C.

== Education ==
- 1980 Tactical Air Command Noncommissioned Officer Leadership School, Homestead Air Force Base, Fla.
- 1983 Tactical Air Command Noncommissioned Officer Academy, Tyndall Air Force Base, Fla.
- 1987 Associate degree in electronic systems technology, Community College of the Air Force
- 1990 U.S. Air Force Senior Noncommissioned Officer Academy, Gunter Air Force Base, Ala.
- 1991 Associate degree in instructor of technology, Community College of the Air Force

== Awards and decorations ==
Air Force Distinguished Service Medal
Legion of Merit
Meritorious Service Medal with three bronze oak leaf clusters
Air Force Commendation Medal
Air Force Organizational Excellence Award with three bronze oak leaf clusters
Air Force Good Conduct Medal with silver and three bronze oak leaf clusters
National Defense Service Medal with bronze service star
Air Force Overseas Long Tour Service Ribbon with bronze oak leaf cluster
Air Force Longevity Service Award with silver and bronze oak leaf cluster
NCO Professional Military Education Graduate Ribbon with two bronze oak leaf clusters
Small Arms Expert Marksmanship Ribbon
Air Force Training Ribbon

Military offices
Preceded by Eric W. Benken	Chief Master Sergeant of the Air Force; 1999–2002	Succeeded by Gerald R. Murray
