= James Roy =

James Roy may refer to:

- James A. Roy (born 1964), US Chief Master Sergeant of the Air Force
- James Roy (politician) (1893–1971), New Zealand politician of the National Party
- James Roy (writer) (born 1968), Australian writer
- James Joy Mohan Nichols Roy (1884–1959), Indian Christian minister and politician
