= David J. Campanale =

Chief Master Sergeant of the US Air Force

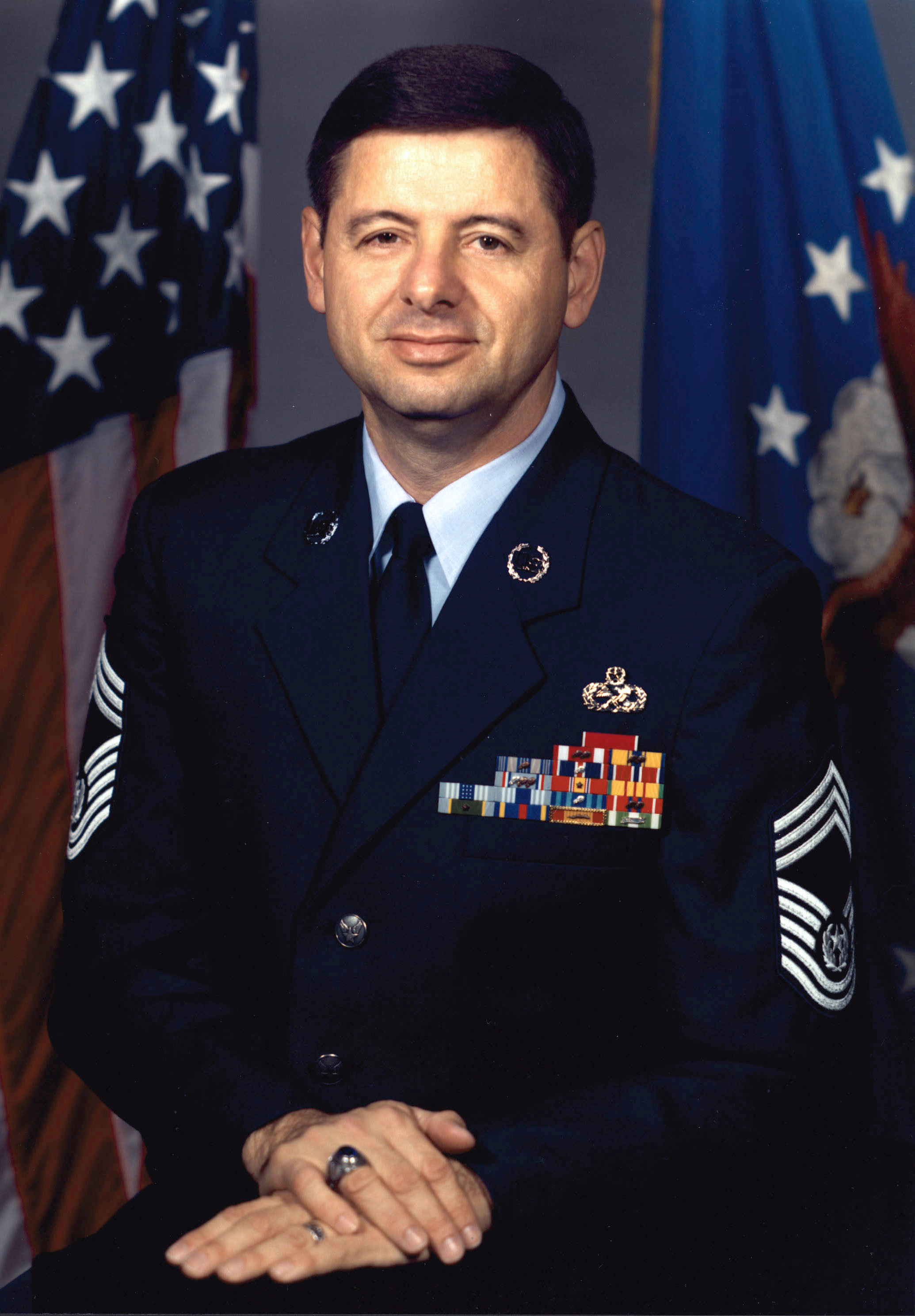
- Campanale c. 1994
- Born: October 7, 1952 (age 74); Worcester, Massachusetts, US
- Military career
- Branch: United States Air Force
- Service years: 1970–1997
- Rank: Chief Master Sergeant of the Air Force
- Conflicts: Vietnam War
- Awards: Air Force Distinguished Service Medal; Legion of Merit; Meritorious Service Medal (3); Air Force Commendation Medal (3); Air Force Achievement Medal (2)

David J. Campanale (born October 7, 1952) is a retired Chief Master Sergeant of the United States Air Force who served as the 11th Chief Master Sergeant of the Air Force from 1994 to 1996.

== Early life ==
Campanale was born in Worcester, Massachusetts, on October 7, 1952. He graduated from North High School and entered the United States Air Force in October 1970 .

== Military career ==
Campanale completed technical training as an aircraft maintenance specialist at Sheppard Air Force Base, Texas. In February 1971, he was assigned as a B-52 Stratofortress crew chief in the 2nd Organization Maintenance Squadron, Barksdale Air Force Base, Louisiana. While there, he completed three successive tours at Andersen Air Force Base, Guam, in support of B-52 Operation Arc Light missions in Southeast Asia. His career included tours at bases in Indiana, Hawaii, New Hampshire, and Nebraska. He served as Senior Enlisted Advisor to the 93rd Bomb Wing, Castle Air Force Base, California; and Air Mobility Command, Scott Air Force Base, Illinois.

Campanale served as the Chief Master Sergeant of the Air Force from October 1994 to November 1996. His most notable contributions include a push for single dorm occupancy, which led to the current dorm single occupancy policy, and a reduction of DUI incidents at Castle Air Force Base in one year from over 190, to fewer than five. Campanale also fought a uniform change which removed name tapes and rank insignia from the battle dress uniform. The Air Force swapped for a short time to a single black label worn over the left breast pocket which contained text including the rank, name, and position of the individual. Disagreeing with this change, Campanale said,

To prove my point, I had the secretary of a 3-star General remove the stars [rank insignia] from the Generals' BDU collar, then affixed the black label over his nametape as would be worn by everyone else. I then challenged that if he were to walk with me around the base, nobody would salute or render courtesies, since they couldn't read it. He accepted my challenge, and after about an hour of walking, someone finally recognized the General and said, "Hey...aren't you General so and so?"

Within a few weeks, the black patch was being phased out, and the rank insignia/name tapes were on the way back in.

Campanale was accused of being a personal friend of a Bataan prisoner of war impostor, whom he was promoting for an NCO of the Year-type award. Despite being advised of serious discrepancies in the impostor's story and credentials, Campanale dismissed all allegations. After Campanale was replaced by Eric W. Benken the matter was re-assessed.

Campanale retired from active duty effective January 1, 1997. He now resides in southern Arizona and frequently speaks at Air Force gatherings.

== Assignments ==
1. October 1970 – December 1970, Basic Military Training, Lackland Air Force Base, Texas
2. December 1970 – February 1971, student, technical training, Sheppard Air Force Base, Texas
3. February 1971 – April 1974, B-52 Stratofortress crew chief, 2nd Organizational Maintenance Squadron, Barksdale Air Force Base, Louisiana.
4. April 1974 – August 1978, 305th Field Maintenance Squadron, Grissom Air Force Base, Indiana.
5. August 1978 – August 1983, C-130 Hercules crew chief; noncommissioned officer in charge, C-130 inspection branch; and maintenance superintendent, 6594th Test Group, Air Force Systems Command, Hickam Air Force Base, Hawaii
6. August 1983 – August 1986, FB-111A and KC-135 Stratotanker flight chief and line chief, 509th Organizational Maintenance Squadron; and senior maintenance controller for the deputy commander for maintenance, 509th Bomb Wing, Pease Air Force Base, New Hampshire.
7. August 1986 – May 1989, FB-111A and Rockwell B-1B Lancer systems program manager, Headquarters Strategic Air Command, – Offutt Air Force Base, Nebraska.
8. May 1989 – February 1992, senior enlisted adviser, 93rd Bomb Wing, Castle Air Force Base, Calif.
9. February 1992 – October 1994, senior enlisted adviser, Military Airlift Command and Air Mobility Command, Scott Air Force Base, Illinois.
10. October 1994 – November 1996, Chief Master Sergeant of the Air Force, The Pentagon, Washington, D.C.

== Awards and decorations ==
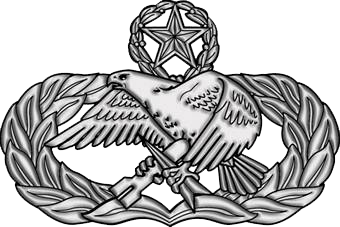
Master Maintenance Badge

Personal decorations
	Air Force Distinguished Service Medal
Width-44 crimson ribbon with a pair of width-2 white stripes on the edges	Legion of Merit
	Meritorious Service Medal with two bronze oak leaf clusters
	Air Force Commendation Medal with two bronze oak leaf clusters
	Air Force Achievement Medal with bronze oak leaf cluster
Unit awards
	Air Force Outstanding Unit Award with Valor device and silver oak leaf cluster
	Air Force Organizational Excellence Award
Service awards
	Air Force Good Conduct Medal with silver and three bronze oak leaf clusters
Campaign and service medals
	National Defense Service Medal with service star
	Vietnam Service Medal
Service, training, and marksmanship awards
	Air Force Overseas Short Tour Service Ribbon
	Air Force Overseas Long Tour Service Ribbon
	Air Force Longevity Service Award with silver oak leaf cluster
	NCO Professional Military Education Graduate Ribbon with two oak leaf clusters
	Small Arms Expert Marksmanship Ribbon with service star
	Air Force Training Ribbon
Foreign awards
	Vietnam Gallantry Cross Unit Award
	Vietnam Campaign Medal

=== Other achievements ===
- Graduate, U.S. Air Force Senior NCO Academy
- Distinguished Graduate and Speech Awards, Pacific Air Forces NCO Leadership School
- Commandant's Award and Distinguished Graduate, Military Airlift Command NCO Academy

Military offices
Preceded by Gary R. Pfingston	Chief Master Sergeant of the Air Force; 1994–1996	Succeeded by Eric W. Benken
