= James A. Cody =

17th Chief Master Sergeant of the US Air Force

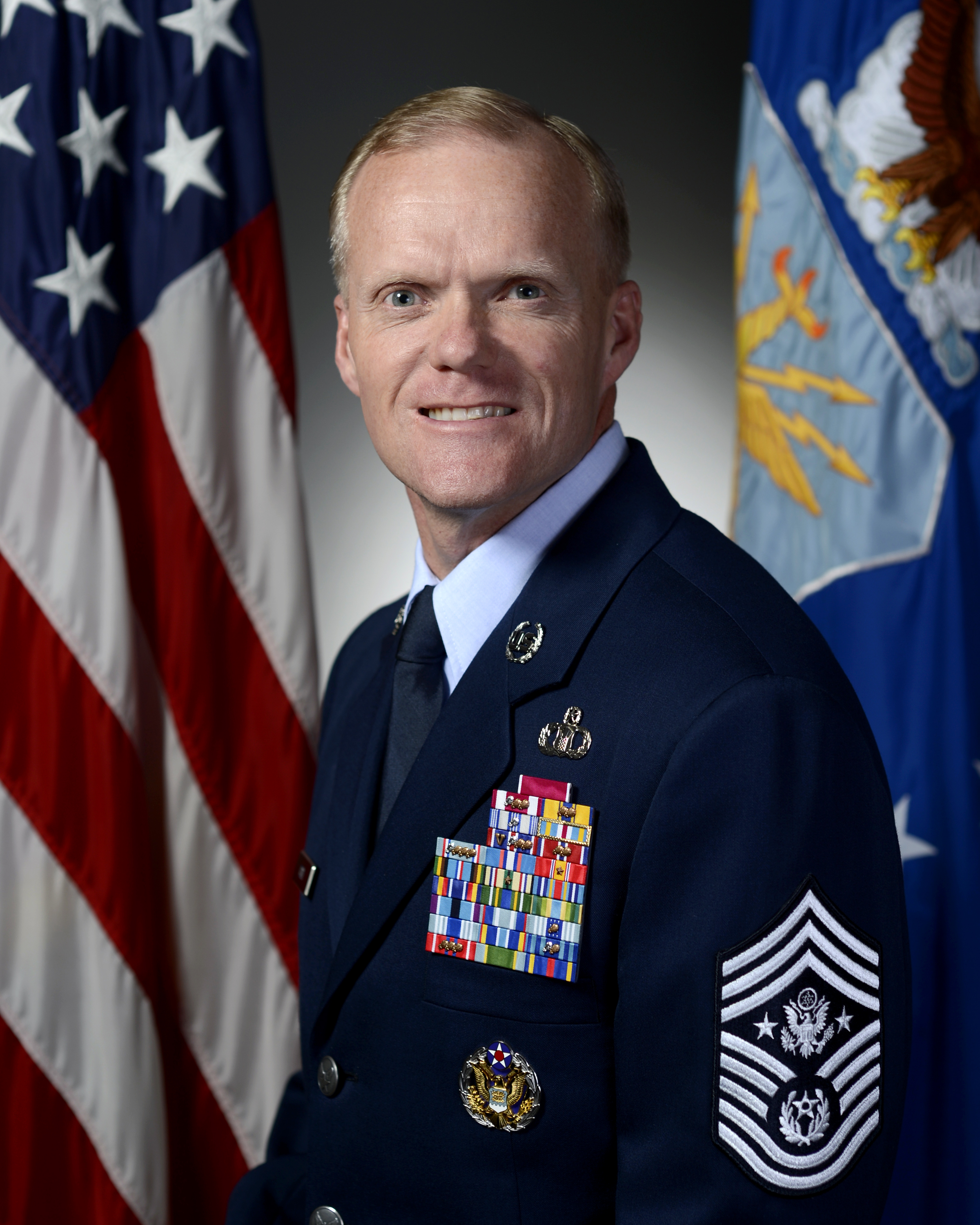
- Cody in c. 2013
- Born: June 19, 1965 (age 61); Massachusetts, U.S.
- Allegiance: United States of America
- Branch: United States Air Force
- Service years: 1984–2017
- Rank: Chief Master Sergeant of the Air Force
- Conflicts: Operation Southern Watch; War in Afghanistan
- Awards: Air Force Distinguished Service Medal; Legion of Merit; Meritorious Service Medal (8); Air Force Commendation Medal (3); Air Force Achievement Medal (6)
- Education: Community College of the Air Force (AAS); Trident University International (BS)

James A. Cody (born June 19, 1965) is a retired airman of the United States Air Force who served as the 17th Chief Master Sergeant of the Air Force from January 24, 2013 until his retirement on February 17, 2017. He served as the personal adviser to the Chief of Staff and the Secretary of the Air Force on all issues regarding the welfare, readiness, morale, and proper utilization and advancement of the enlisted force.

== Military career ==
Cody entered the United States Air Force in November 1984. He graduated from the air traffic control specialist course at Keesler Air Force Base, Mississippi in May 1985. His background includes various duties in air traffic control at the unit and major-command levels. Throughout his career, he has filled myriad roles including additional-duty first sergeant and Directorate Superintendent. His assignments include bases in New Hampshire, California, Virginia, and Florida. He also served overseas in Germany, South Korea, Turkey, and deployed in support of Operations Southern Watch and Enduring Freedom.

Prior to assuming his last position, Cody served as the Command Chief Master Sergeant, Air Education and Training Command, Randolph Air Force Base, Texas.

== Education ==
1987 Noncommissioned Officer Preparatory School, Kapaun Air Station, Germany
1989 Air Force Communications Command Noncommissioned Officer Leadership School, Keesler Air Force Base, Mississippi
1993 Noncommissioned Officer Academy Correspondence Course
1995 USAFE Noncommissioned Officer Academy, Kapaun Air Station, Germany
1997 Senior Noncommissioned Officer Academy Correspondence Course
1998 Associate degree airway science, Community College of the Air Force
2001 Senior Noncommissioned Officer Academy, Maxwell Air Force Base, Alabama
2005 Chief's Leadership Course, Maxwell Air Force Base, Alabama
2005 United States Air Force Senior Leadership Course, Center for Creative Leadership, San Diego, California
2006 Gettysburg Leadership Experience, Gettysburg, Pennsylvania
2008 Senior Enlisted Joint Professional Military Education Correspondence Course
2008 AFSO 21 Executive Leadership Course, Disney Institute, Orlando, Florida
2009 Keystone, National Defense University, Fort Lesley J. McNair, Washington, D.C.
2010 COMAFFOR Senior Staff Course, United States Air Force Expeditionary Center, New Jersey
2010 United States Air Force Enterprise Management Seminar, Darden School of Business, University of Virginia
2012 Bachelor of Science degree in business administration, Trident University International, Cypress, California

== Assignments ==
1. November 1984 – January 1985, Student, Basic Military Training, Lackland Air Force Base, Texas
2. January 1985 – June 1985, Student, Technical Training School, Keesler Air Force Base, Mississippi
3. June 1985 – June 1988, Air Traffic Controller, 1964th CG, Ramstein Air Base, Germany
4. June 1988 – January 1991, ATC Watch Supervisor, 1916th CS, Pease Air Force Base, New Hampshire
5. January 1991 – May 1993, ATC Watch Supervisor, 30th OSS, Vandenberg Air Force Base, California
6. May 1993 – May 1994, ATC Watch Supervisor, 51st OSS, Osan Air Base, South Korea
7. June 1994 – June 1996, Superintendent, Airfield Operations Training, 39th OSS, Incirlik Air Base, Turkey
8. June 1996 – March 2000, Superintendent, Airfield Operations, Readiness/Training, Headquarters Air Combat Command, Langley Air Force Base, Virginia
9. March 2000 – May 2003, Chief Controller, Tower, 1st Sergeant, 6th OSS, MacDill Air Force Base, Florida (April 2002 – Jul 2002, Superintendent, Combat Airspace Management Cell, Joint Task Force-Southwest Asia, Prince Sultan Air Base, Kingdom of Saudi Arabia)
10. June 2003 – July 2005, Superintendent, Directorate of Air and Space Operations and ATC Functional Manager, Headquarters Air Combat Command, Langley Air Force Base, Virginia
11. July 2005 – August 2007, Command Chief, 15th Expeditionary Mobility Task Force, Travis Air Force Base, California
12. Aug 2007 – July 2008, Command Chief, 6th Air Mobility Wing, MacDill Air Force Base, Florida
13. July 2008 – Sep 2010, Command Chief, 18th Air Force, Scott Air Force Base, Illinois
14. Sep 2010 – January 2013, Command Chief, Air Education and Training Command, Joint Base San Antonio/Randolph Air Force Base, Texas
15. January 2013 – February 2017, Chief Master Sergeant of the Air Force, The Pentagon, Washington, D.C.

== Awards and decorations ==
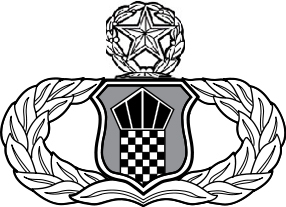
Master Air Traffic Control Badge
Headquarters Air Force Badge

Personal decorations
	Air Force Distinguished Service Medal
Width-44 crimson ribbon with a pair of width-2 white stripes on the edges	Legion of Merit
	Meritorious Service Medal with silver and two bronze oak leaf clusters
	Air Force Commendation Medal with two bronze oak leaf clusters
	Air Force Achievement Medal with silver oak leaf cluster
Unit awards
	Joint Meritorious Unit Award
	Air Force Outstanding Unit Award with "V" device, silver and two bronze oak leaf clusters
	Organizational Excellence Award with two bronze oak leaf clusters
Service awards
	Air Force Good Conduct Medal with silver and three bronze oak leaf clusters
	(second ribbon denoting tenth award)
	Outstanding Airman of the Year Ribbon
Campaign and service medals
	National Defense Service Medal with bronze service star
	Armed Forces Expeditionary Medal
	Southwest Asia Service Medal with bronze service star
	Global War on Terrorism Expeditionary Medal
	Global War on Terrorism Service Medal
	Korea Defense Service Medal
	Armed Forces Service Medal
	Humanitarian Service Medal
	Air and Space Campaign Medal
	Nuclear Deterrence Operations Service Medal with two oak leaf clusters
Service, training, and marksmanship awards
	Air Force Overseas Short Tour Service Ribbon with bronze oak leaf cluster
	Air Force Overseas Long Tour Service Ribbon
	Air Force Expeditionary Service Ribbon
	Air Force Longevity Service Award with silver and two bronze oak leaf clusters
	NCO Professional Military Education Graduate Ribbon with three bronze oak leaf clusters
	Small Arms Expert Marksmanship Ribbon with service star
	Air Force Training Ribbon

=== Other achievements ===
1994 PACAF ORI Outstanding Performer
1994 39th Air Base Wing NCO of the Year
1995 John L. Levitow Award, NCO Academy
1995 USAFE ATC Training Achievement Award
1995 STEP promotion to Master Sergeant
1997 ACC Director of Air and Space Operations SNCO of the Year
2001 Distinguished Graduate, SNCO Academy
2001 AMC Air Traffic Control Enlisted Manager of the Year
2001 Tampa Bay Military Citizen of the Year
2001 Air Mobility Command SNCO of the Year

Military offices
Preceded by James A. Roy	Chief Master Sergeant of the Air Force; 2013–2017	Succeeded by Kaleth O. Wright
