= Rodney J. McKinley =

15th Chief Master Sergeant of the USAF

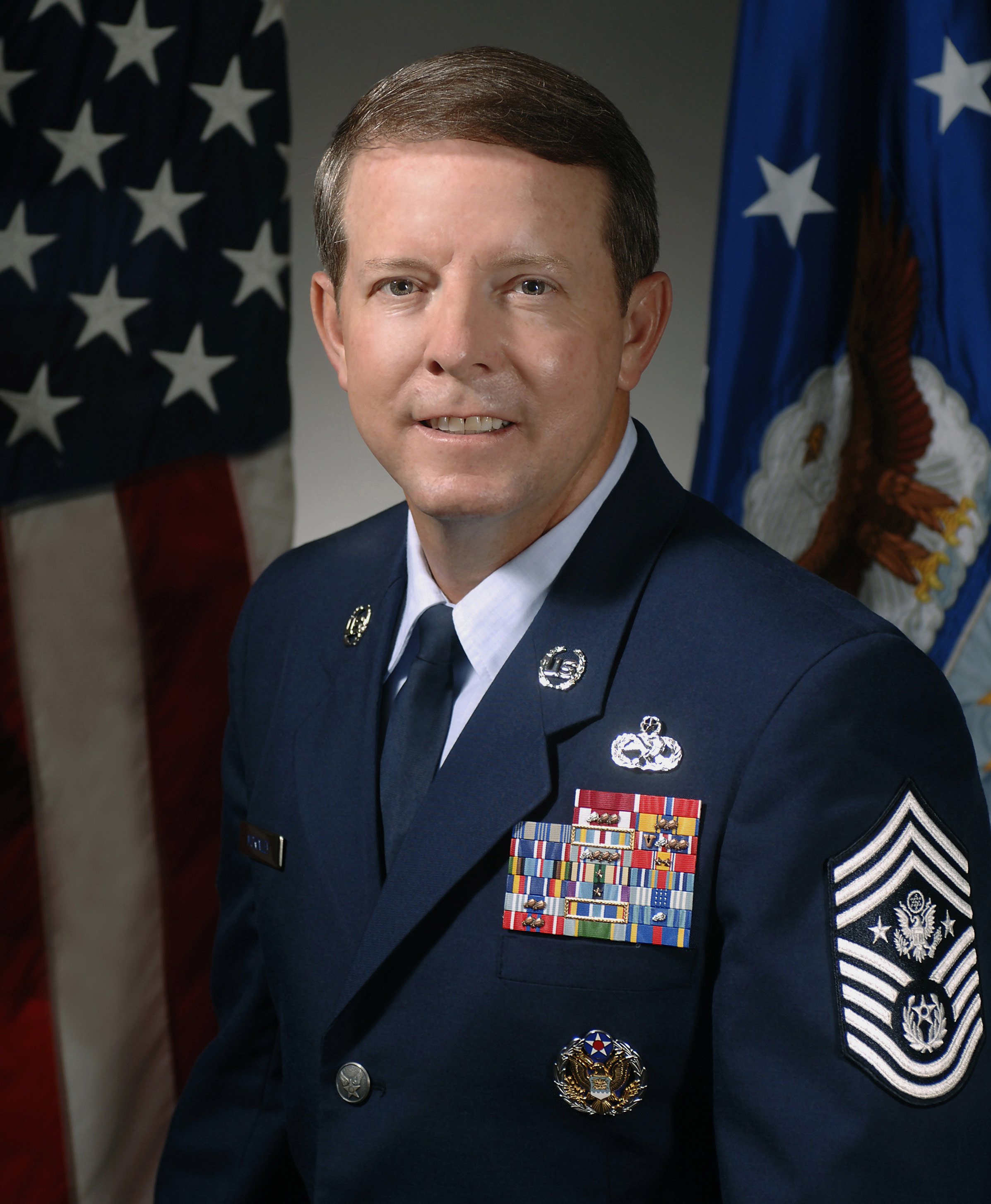
- McKinley c. 2006
- Born: January 17, 1956 (age 70); Georgetown, Ohio, US
- Military career
- Branch: United States Air Force
- Service years: 1974–1977; 1982–2009
- Rank: Chief Master Sergeant of the Air Force
- Conflicts: War in Afghanistan; Iraq War
- Awards: Air Force Distinguished Service Medal; Legion of Merit; Bronze Star Medal; Meritorious Service Medal (8); Air Force Commendation Medal (3); Air Force Achievement Medal

Rodney J. McKinley (born January 17, 1956) is a retired airman of the United States Air Force who served as the 15th Chief Master Sergeant of the Air Force from 2006 to 2009.

== Military career ==
McKinley grew up in Mt. Orab, Ohio, graduating from Western Brown High School in 1974. He originally entered the United States Air Force in 1974, took a break in service in 1977 to attend college, and re-entered the Air Force in 1982. His background includes various duties in medical and aircraft maintenance, and as a first sergeant and Command Chief Master Sergeant at wing, numbered air force and major command levels. His assignments include bases in North Carolina, South Carolina, Oklahoma, Virginia, Alaska, and Hawaii. He also served overseas in the Philippines, Italy and Germany, and deployed to Southwest Asia in support of operations Enduring Freedom and Iraqi Freedom.

McKinley served as Command Chief Master Sergeant of the Pacific Air Forces at Hickam Air Force Base in Hawaii. He was appointed to the position of Chief Master Sergeant of the Air Force on June 30, 2006. In this post, McKinley represented the highest enlisted level of leadership and, as such, provided direction for the enlisted corps and represents their interests, as appropriate, to the American public, and to those in all levels of government. He served as the personal adviser to the chief of staff and the secretary of the Air Force on all issues regarding the welfare, readiness, morale, and proper utilization and progress of the enlisted force.

== Post-military career ==
McKinley retired from the United States Air Force in June 2009, having served for over 30 years. From then to November 2012, he was senior vice president for strategic partnerships at MicroTech, a privately held information technology services company. Since January 2017, he has served on the Defense Advisory Committee on Investigations, Prosecution, and Defense of Sexual Assault in the US Department of Defense.

== Education ==
- 1984 Tactical Air Command NCO Leadership School, Myrtle Beach AFB, South Carolina
- 1986 Associate of Arts degree, Saint Leo College, Saint Leo, Florida
- 1986 Associate of Applied Science degree in aircraft maintenance technology, Community College of the Air Force
- 1986 Bachelor of Arts degree in human resources management, Saint Leo College, Saint Leo, Florida
- 1987 Tactical Air Command NCO Academy, Tyndall AFB, Florida
- 1991 USAF First Sergeant Academy, Keesler AFB, Mississippi
- 1997 USAF Senior NCO Academy, Maxwell Air Force Base, Alabama
- 1998 Associate of Applied Science degree in personnel management, Community College of the Air Force
- 1999 Master of Human Relations degree, University of Oklahoma, Norman, Oklahoma
- 2004 USAF Senior Leadership Course, Center for Creative Leadership, San Diego
- 2004 USAF Senior Leadership Course, Gettysburg College, Pennsylvania
- 2006 Keystone Course, National Defense University, Suffolk, Virginia
- 2007 Air Force Enterprise Management Seminar, University of North Carolina, Chapel Hill, North Carolina

== Assignments ==
1. July 1974 – August 1974, student, basic military training, Lackland AFB, Texas
2. August 1974 – November 1974, medical service specialist technical training, Sheppard AFB, Texas
3. November 1974 – August 1977, emergency room technician, Seymour Johnson AFB, NC
4. August 1977 – April 1982, separated from the Air Force
5. April 1982 – June 1982, aircraft maintenance technology technical training, Sheppard AFB, Texas
6. June 1982 – June 1987, phase dock inspector, maintenance instructor, quality assurance inspector, noncommissioned officer in charge of aircraft weight and balance and functional check flights, 354th Tactical Fighter Wing, Myrtle Beach AFB, SC
7. June 1987 – June 1991, dedicated crew chief, quality assurance inspector, noncommissioned officer in charge aircraft weight and balance and functional check flights, chief inspector of quality assurance, 3rd Tactical Fighter Wing, Clark Air Base, Philippines
8. June 1991 – June 1992, First Sergeant, 354th Communications and Services squadrons, Myrtle Beach AFB, SC
9. June 1992 – January 1994, First Sergeant, 401st Munitions Support Squadron, Ghedi AB, Italy
10. January 1994 – July 2000, First Sergeant, 3rd Combat Communications Support Squadron, 965th Airborne Air Control Squadron, 552nd Equipment Maintenance Squadron, and 552nd Aircraft Generation Squadron, Tinker AFB, OK
11. July 2000 – July 2001, First Sergeant, 723rd Air Mobility Squadron, Ramstein AB, Germany
12. August 2001 – September 2002, Command Chief Master Sergeant, 86th Airlift Wing, Ramstein AB, Germany
13. September 2002 – June 2004, Command Chief Master Sergeant, 1st Fighter Wing, Langley AFB, VA (February 2003 – June 2003, Command Chief Master Sergeant, 379th Air Expeditionary Wing, Southwest Asia)
14. June 2004 – March 2005, Command Chief Master Sergeant, 11th Air Force, Elmendorf AFB, AK
15. March 2005 – June 2006, Command Chief Master Sergeant, Pacific Air Forces, Hickam AFB, HI
16. June 2006 – June 2009, Chief Master Sergeant of the Air Force, The Pentagon, Washington, D.C.

== Awards and decorations ==
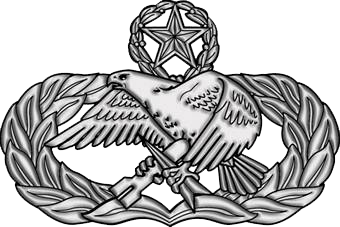
Master Maintenance Badge
Headquarters Air Force Badge

Personal decorations
	Air Force Distinguished Service Medal
Width-44 crimson ribbon with a pair of width-2 white stripes on the edges	Legion of Merit
Width-44 scarlet ribbon with width-4 ultramarine blue stripe at center, surrounded by width-1 white stripes. Width-1 white stripes are at the edges.	Bronze Star Medal
Width-44 crimson ribbon with two width-8 white stripes at distance 4 from the edges.	Meritorious Service Medal with silver and two bronze oak leaf clusters
	Air Force Commendation Medal with two bronze oak leaf clusters
	Air Force Achievement Medal
Unit awards
	Joint Meritorious Unit Award
	Air Force Outstanding Unit Award with Valor device, silver, and two bronze oak leaf clusters
	Air Force Outstanding Unit Award (Ninth award requires second ribbon due to spacing of accouterments)
Service awards
	Air Force Good Conduct Medal with silver and three bronze oak leaf clusters
	Air Force Good Conduct Medal (Tenth award requires second ribbon due to spacing of accouterments)
Campaign and service medals
Width=44 scarlet ribbon with a central width-4 golden yellow stripe, flanked by pairs of width-1 scarlet, white, Old Glory blue, and white stripes	National Defense Service Medal with two bronze service stars
	Armed Forces Expeditionary Medal
Width-44 ribbon with the following stripes, arranged symmetrically from the edges to the center: width-2 black, width-4 chamois, width-2 Old Glory blue, width-2 white, width-2 Old Glory red, width-6 chamouis, width-3 myrtle green up to a central width-2 black stripe	Southwest Asia Service Medal with bronze service star
	Global War on Terrorism Expeditionary Medal
	Global War on Terrorism Service Medal
	Humanitarian Service Medal with bronze service star
Service, training, and marksmanship awards
	Air Force Overseas Short Tour Service Ribbon
	Air Force Overseas Long Tour Service Ribbon with two bronze oak leaf clusters
	Air Force Expeditionary Service Ribbon with gold frame
	Air Force Longevity Service Award with silver and bronze oak leaf cluster
	NCO Professional Military Education Graduate Ribbon with two bronze oak leaf clusters
	Small Arms Expert Marksmanship Ribbon
	Air Force Training Ribbon

=== Other achievements ===
- 1984 John Levitow and Esprit de Corps winner, NCO Leadership School
- 1985 Maintenance Professional of the Year for Quality Assurance, 354th Tactical Fighter Wing
- 1990 Maintenance Professional of the Year, 3rd Tactical Fighter Wing
- 1994 First Sergeant of the Year, 3rd Combat Communications Group
- 1994 First Sergeant of the Year, 12th Air Force
- 1996 First Sergeant of the Year, 552nd Air Control Wing
- 1996 First Sergeant of the Year, Tinker AFB, Okla.

Military offices
Preceded by Gerald R. Murray	Chief Master Sergeant of the Air Force; 2006–2009	Succeeded by James A. Roy
