= James A. Roy =

16th Chief Master Sergeant of the Air Force

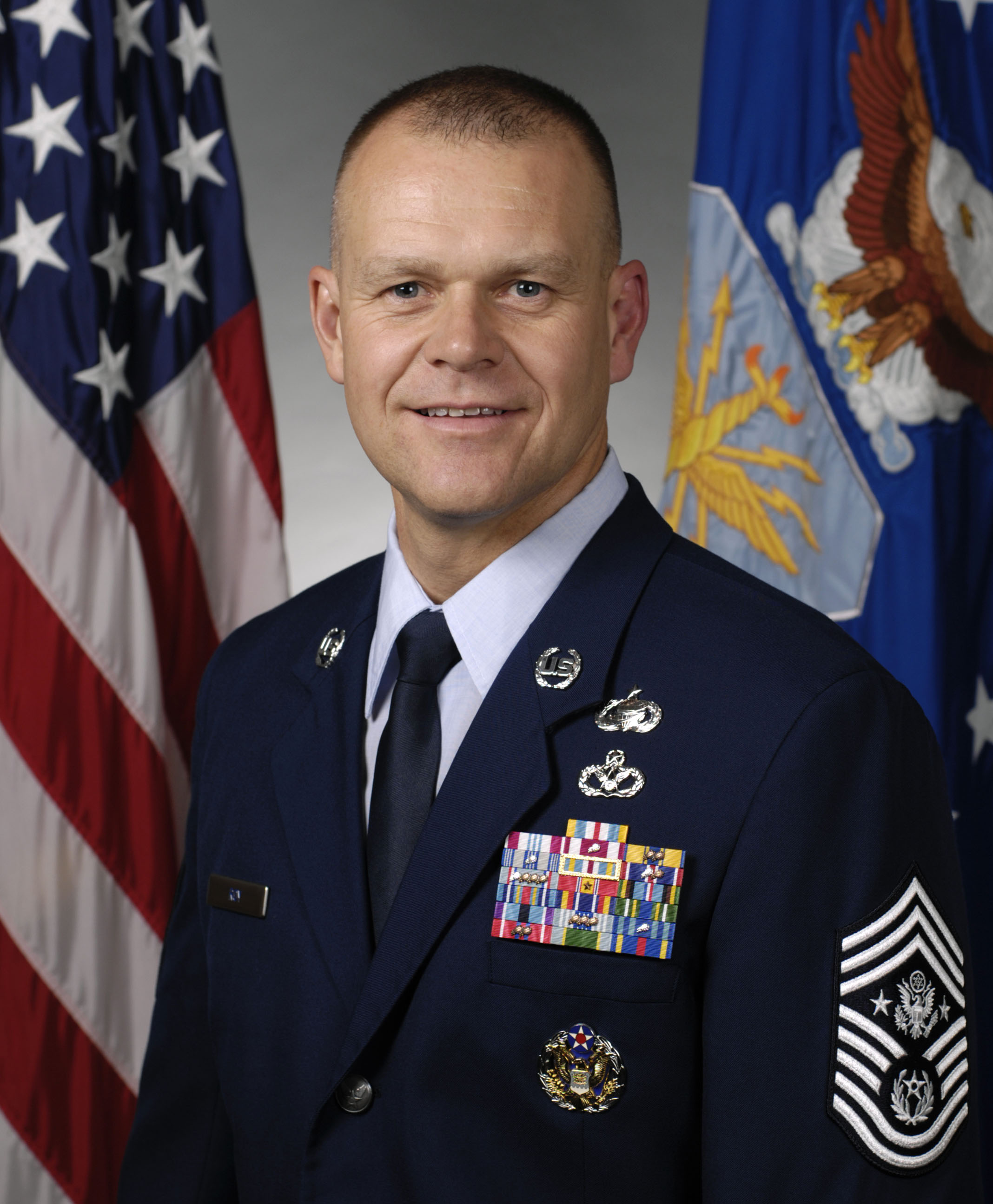
- Roy c. 2009
- Born: May 18, 1964 (age 62); Michigan, US
- Military career
- Branch: United States Air Force
- Service years: 1982–2013
- Rank: Chief Master Sergeant of the Air Force
- Awards: Air Force Distinguished Service Medal; Defense Superior Service Medal; Defense Meritorious Service Medal; Meritorious Service Medal (6); Air Force Commendation Medal (3); Air Force Achievement Medal (6)

James A. Roy (born May 18, 1964) is a retired Chief Master Sergeant of the United States Air Force who served as the 16th Chief Master Sergeant of the Air Force from June 30, 2009, to January 24, 2013. He was previously the Senior Enlisted Leader and Advisor for United States Pacific Command.

== Military career ==
Roy grew up in Monroe, Michigan, and he entered the United States Air Force in September 1982. His background includes numerous leadership roles at squadron, group, numbered air force and combatant command levels. He has worked a variety of civil engineer duties. Roy also served as a superintendent of a military personnel flight and a mission support group before becoming a command chief master sergeant at the wing, air expeditionary wing, numbered air force and combatant command levels. Before assuming duties as Chief Master Sergeant of the Air Force, he served as the Senior Enlisted Leader and adviser to the U.S. Pacific Command Combatant Commander and staff, Camp H. M. Smith, Hawaii.

In September 2012, Roy announced his retirement, effective February 1, 2013. He was succeeded by James A. Cody.

The bulk of Roy's efforts focused on three key areas: deliberately developing airmen; caring for airmen and their families; and building partner nation capacity.

== Education ==
1985 Noncommissioned Officer Preparatory Course, MacDill AFB, Florida
1991 Associate of Science degree in construction management, Park College, Parkville, Missouri
1992 Associate of Applied Science degree in construction technology, Community College of the Air Force
1993 Noncommissioned Officer Academy, Kadena Air Base, Japan
1993 Associate in Applied Science degree in instructor of technology and military science, Community College of the Air Force
1996 Senior Noncommissioned Officer Academy, Gunter AFB, Alabama
1996 Bachelor of Science degree in engineering management, Park College, summa cum laude, Parkville, Missouri
2000 Master of Science degree in human resources management, Troy State University, Troy, Alabama
2005 USAF Senior Leadership Course, Center for Creative Leadership, Greensboro, North Carolina
2005 Keystone, U.S. Joint Forces Command, Suffolk, Virginia
2005 Leadership Team Awareness Course, Defense Equal Opportunity Management Institute, Patrick AFB, Florida
2006 USAF Senior Leadership Course, Gettysburg College, Gettysburg, Pennsylvania
2008 Security Assistance Management-Overseas Course, Defense Institute of Security Assistance Management, Wright-Patterson AFB, Ohio

== Assignments ==
1. September 1982 - November 1982, trainee, Basic Military Training, Lackland AFB, Texas
2. November 1982 - February 1983, student, heavy equipment operator, Fort Leonard Wood, Missouri
3. February 1983 - January 1987, heavy equipment operator, 56th Civil Engineering Squadron, MacDill AFB, Florida
4. February 1987 - December 1987, heavy equipment operator, 554th Civil Engineering Squadron, Osan Air Base, Republic of Korea
5. January 1988 - May 1992, instructor/instructor supervisor, heavy equipment operator, 3770th Technical Training Group, Detachment 0001, Fort Leonard Wood, Missouri
6. May 1992 - May 1993, foreman, horizontal construction, 8th Civil Engineering Squadron, Kunsan Air Base, Republic of Korea
7. May 1993 - March 1994, foreman, heavy repair, 633d Civil Engineering Squadron, Andersen AFB, Guam
8. April 1994 - March 1995, manager, heavy repair, 36th Civil Engineering Squadron, Andersen AFB, Guam
9. March 1995 - November 1996, chief, readiness flight, 36th Civil Engineering Squadron, Andersen AFB, Guam
10. November 1996 - July 1997, chief, heavy repair, 36th Civil Engineering Squadron, Andersen AFB, Guam
11. August 1997 - July 1999, chief, facility maintenance, 81st Civil Engineering Squadron, Keesler AFB, Mississippi
12. July 1999 - March 2000, superintendent, military personnel flight, 81st Mission Support Squadron, Keesler AFB, Mississippi
13. March 2000 - September 2000, superintendent, 81st Support Group, Keesler AFB, Mississippi
14. September 2000 - September 2002, command chief master sergeant, 14th Flying Training Wing, Columbus AFB, Mississippi
15. September 2002 - May 2004, command chief master sergeant, 437th Airlift Wing, Charleston AFB, South Carolina
16. June 2004 - August 2005, command chief master sergeant, 1st Fighter Wing, Langley AFB, Virginia (Oct 2004 - Nov 2004, command chief master sergeant, 386th Air Expeditionary Wing, Ali Al Salem AB, Kuwait)
17. August 2005 - May 2007, command chief master sergeant, United States Forces Japan and Fifth Air Force, Yokota Air Base, Japan
18. June 2007 - June 2009, Senior Enlisted Leader and Advisor, United States Pacific Command, Camp H.M. Smith, Hawaii
19. June 2009 - January 2013, Chief Master Sergeant of the Air Force, the Pentagon, Washington, D.C

== Awards and decorations ==
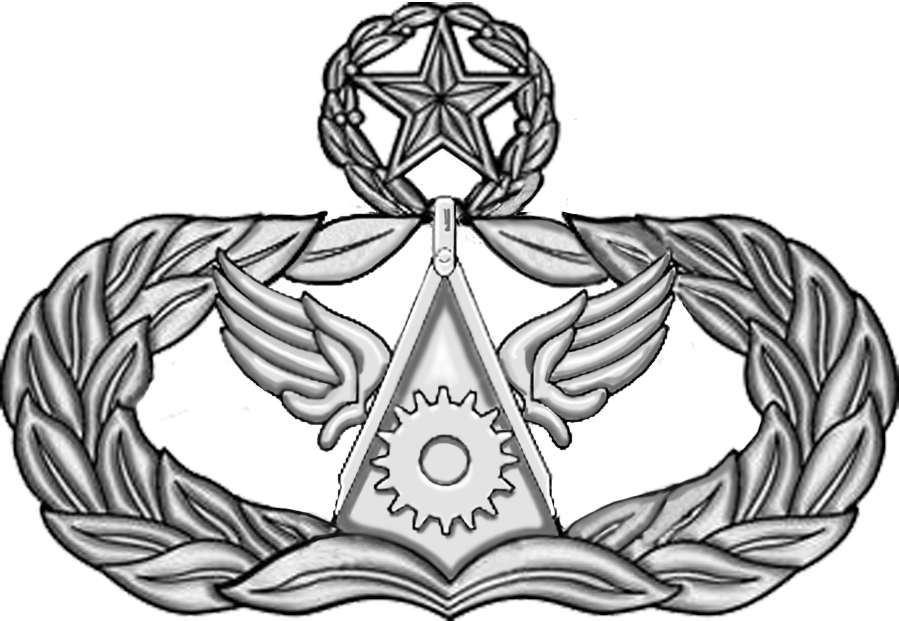
Senior Manpower & Personnel Badge
Master Civil Engineer Badge
Headquarters Air Force Badge

Personal decorations
Air Force Distinguished Service Medal
Defense Superior Service Medal
Defense Meritorious Service Medal
Meritorious Service Medal with silver oak leaf cluster
Air Force Commendation Medal with two bronze oak leaf clusters
Air Force Achievement Medal with silver oak leaf cluster
Unit awards
Joint Meritorious Unit Award
Air Force Outstanding Unit Award with silver and bronze oak leaf clusters
Service awards
Air Force Good Conduct Medal with silver and three bronze oak leaf clusters
Air Force Good Conduct Medal (Second ribbon required for accoutrements spacing)
Campaign and service medals
National Defense Service Medal with service star
Armed Forces Expeditionary Medal
Global War on Terrorism Expeditionary Medal
Global War on Terrorism Service Medal
Korea Defense Service Medal
Humanitarian Service Medal
Service, training, and marksmanship awards
Air Force Overseas Short Tour Service Ribbon with three bronze oak leaf clusters
Air Force Longevity Service Award with silver and bronze oak leaf clusters
NCO Professional Military Education Graduate Ribbon with two bronze oak leaf clusters
Small Arms Expert Marksmanship Ribbon
Air Force Training Ribbon

=== Other achievements ===
1993 John Levitow Award, Noncommissioned Officer Academy
1996 Senior Noncommissioned Officer the Year, 13th Air Force
1996 Ancient Order of Chamorro and a special resolution from Guam's 24th Legislature

Military offices
Preceded by Rodney J. McKinley	Chief Master Sergeant of the Air Force; 2009–2013	Succeeded by James A. Cody
