= Airey Non-Commissioned Officer Academy =

The Airey Non-Commissioned Officer Academy is an academy for non-commissioned officers at Tyndall Air Force Base. Founded in 1957 at Otis Air Force Base, the academy moved to Stewart Air Force Base in 1959 and Hamilton Air Force Base in 1960. In 1978, it moved to Tyndall where it has remained since.
