= Air Force Sergeants Association =

- Formation: 1961
- Type: 501(c)(19) nonprofit organization
- Purpose: representing the professional and personal interests of active, retired and veteran total enlisted members of the United States Air Force and their families
- Headquarters: Suitland, Maryland
- Region served: United States
- Members: 111,000
- Website: https://www.hqafsa.org/

The Air Force Sergeants Association (AFSA) is a 501(c)(19) non-profit organization representing the professional and personal interests of nearly 111,000 active, retired and veteran total enlisted members of the United States Air Force and their families.

AFSA is the recipient of a congressional charter under Title 36 of the United States Code. It promotes enlisted concerns to enhance their quality of life, assures the preservation of entitlements earned through service and sacrifice, and maintains a vigilant presence on Capitol Hill.

== Membership ==
Membership in the organization is open to: All services, all grades, retirees, and veterans. Family members (spouses, children, parents, and siblings) are also eligible for membership in AFSA. Other persons are eligible for associate memberships in AFSA.

== Structure ==
AFSA is governed by a 12-member executive council. On the council are a president, vice president, and three trustees (representing the uniformed services, retired & veteran personnel, and their family members) who are elected by the general membership. There are seven geographical division presidents who are elected by their constituents. A former AFSA president serves as advisor to the council, as well as the chief executive officer, who reports to the council and operates the international headquarters located in the Airmen Memorial Building in Suitland, Maryland.

== History ==
AFSA was founded and incorporated on 3 May 1961, and has evolved into an organization highly respected by congressional members and Department of Defense officials. AFSA is a leading force on Capitol Hill and works closely with elected representatives and their staff members to assist in drafting proposals for legislation on issues related to military members and their families. AFSA testifies numerous times each year before House and Senate committees and sub-committees. AFSA also works closely with White House staff personnel and Pentagon officials to ensure that enlisted members' concerns specifically, as well as the concerns of all ranks, retirees, veterans, and their family members are heard and acted upon.

The AFSA Professional Airman's Conference is held annually so that senior leadership perspectives can be relayed to the Airman that attend and so that they can be informed of the Air Forces current direction and its future plans.

== Publications ==
The organization publishes AFSA Magazine, formerly Sergeants magazine. The annual Enlisted Almanac edition has been praised as the definitive reference of Air Force and DoD enlisted statistics and projections. The AFSA Newsletter, published each week, informs members of the most recent legislative action, issues, and news that affects them and provides other news of interest to the Total Air Force Enlisted Corps and their families.

== Scholarship programs ==
AFSA and the Airmen Memorial Foundation (AMF) conduct an annual scholarship program to financially assist the undergraduate studies of single, eligible, dependent children of AFAD, AFRC and ANG enlisted members in active duty, retired, or veteran status. The AFSA program contains membership requirement, but there is none in the AMF or CMSAF Scholarship programs. These programs combined have awarded $1,359,850 in college aid to deserving students.

== Airmen Memorial Museum ==
The Airmen Memorial Museum (AMM) stands as a tribute to the enlisted Airmen of the United States Air Force and its predecessor services. The AMM collects and preserves artifacts, tells the enlisted story, and preserves the enlisted heritage of U.S. air and space power via public education.

== Awards ==
The AFSA has annual awards in which it awards to deserving Air Force members such as the AFSA Pitsenbarger Award for an heroic act performed on or off duty by an enlisted active-duty Air Force member. It also has annual awards for cadets including the AFSA Junior Reserve Officer Training Corps (JROTC) award and the AFSA Civil Air Patrol (CAP) award.

In 2023, the AFSA inaugurated the Mark Hamilton Spirit Award in honor of former chapter 254 President Mark Hamilton. It is an annual award for Americanism and Patriotism Excellence.

Other awards include:

- William R. Rivkin Award (since 1968)
- W. Averell Harriman Award (since 1968)
- Christian A. Herter Award (since 1969)
- Avis Bohlen Award (since 1983)
- Nelson B. Delavan Award (since 1991)
- AFSA Achievement and Contributions to the Association (since 1994)
- Lifetime Contributions to American Diplomacy (since 1995)
- M. Juanita Guess Award (since 1995)
- F. Allen "Tex" Harris Award (since 2000)
- Post Representative of the Year (since 2001)
- Special Posthumous Dissent Award (only awarded in 2002)
- AFSA Special Achievement Award (since 2003)
- Mark Palmer Award for the Advancement of Democracy (since 2015)
- Foreign Service Champions (since 2022)
