= Chief Master Sergeant of the Air Force =

Senior enlisted member of the US Air Force

Chief Master Sergeant of the United States Air Force
- Headquarters Air Force Identification Badge

- Flag of the CMSAF

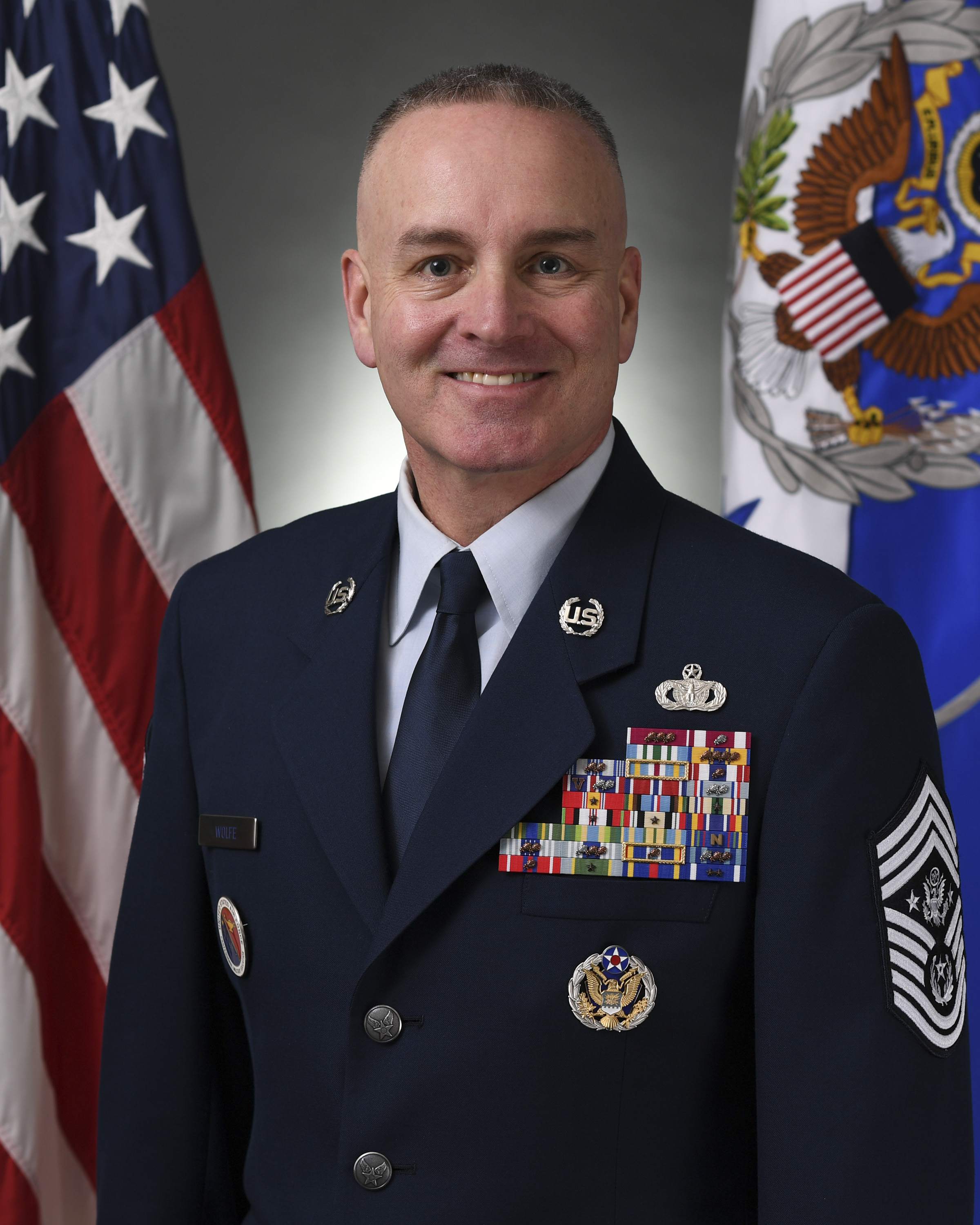
- Incumbent; David R. Wolfe since 8 December 2025
- United States Air Force
- Style: Chief
- Type: Senior enlisted advisor
- Abbreviation: CMSAF
- Member of: The Air Staff
- Reports to: Chief of Staff of the U.S. Air Force
- Appointer: Chief of Staff of the U.S. Air Force
- Formation: April 3, 1967; 59 years ago
- First holder: Paul W. Airey
- Salary: $10,758.00 per month, regardless of the incumbent's service longevity
- Website: Official Website

The chief master sergeant of the Air Force (acronym: CMSAF) is a unique non-commissioned rank in the United States Air Force. The holder of this rank and position of office represents the highest enlisted level of leadership in the Air Force, unless an enlisted airman is serving as the senior enlisted advisor to the chairman. The CMSAF provides direction for the enlisted corps and represents their interests, as appropriate, to the American public, and to those in all levels of government. The CMSAF is appointed by the Air Force chief of staff (AF/CC) and serves as the senior enlisted advisor to the Air Force chief of staff and the secretary of the Air Force on all issues regarding the welfare, readiness, morale, and proper utilization and progress of the enlisted force.

The incumbent 21st chief master sergeant of the Air Force is Chief Master Sergeant David R. Wolfe who became the CMSAF on 8 December 2025.

The chief master sergeant of the Air Force is designated as a special paygrade above E-9, and although the CMSAF is a non-commissioned officer, protocol states that the CMSAF has precedence over all lieutenant generals at joint events, and over all lieutenant generals except the Air Force director of staff at Air Force–exclusive events.

== Establishment ==
The Air Force Association’s Airman Council first put forward the idea of a top non-commissioned officer billet for the Air Force in 1964 in the hopes of improving communication between airmen and the leadership of the Air Force. In July of 1966, the Army would create the Sergeant Major of the Army which would encourage the Marine Corps to elevate the Sergeant Major of the Marine Corps to an advisor to the commandant. In January 1967, the Navy would name their first Master Chief Petty Officer of the Navy, leaving the Air Force the last service without a top senior enlisted billet. Chief of Staff Gen. John P. McConnell would seek out candidates in 1966 - the requirements were that the candidate be a chief master sergeant for at least two years, with 22 or more years of active duty service, be a high school graduate and be of the highest integrity and professionalism.

== Rank insignia and positional colors ==
On 1 November 2004, the CMSAF's rank insignia was updated to include the Great Seal of the United States and two stars in the upper field. This puts the insignia in line with those of the Army and Marine Corps which have similar insignia to denote their senior enlisted servicemen. The laurel wreath around the star in the lower field remained unchanged, to retain the legacy of the Chief Master Sergeants of the Air Force.

The CMSAF wears distinctive collar insignia. Traditionally, enlisted airmen's collar insignia was silver-colored "U.S." within a ring. The CMSAF's collar brass replaced the standard ring with a silver laurel wreath. The CMSAF also wears a distinctive cap device. Enlisted airmen's cap device is the Coat of Arms of the United States, surrounded by a ring, all struck from silver-colored metal. Much as with the position's distinctive collar brass, the ring is replaced with a laurel wreath for the CMSAF.

The sergeant major of the Army, chief master sergeant of the Air Force, chief master sergeant of the Space Force, senior enlisted advisor to the chief of the National Guard Bureau, and the senior enlisted advisor to the chairman are the only members of the United States armed forces below the rank of brigadier general/rear admiral (lower half) to be authorized a positional color (flag). The Chief Master Sergeant of the Air Force colors were authorized in January 2013.

The official term of address for the CMSAF is "Chief Master Sergeant of the Air Force" or "Chief."

CMSAF Sleeve Insignia 1967–1991

CMSAF Sleeve Insignia 1991–2004

CMSAF Sleeve Insignia 2004–present
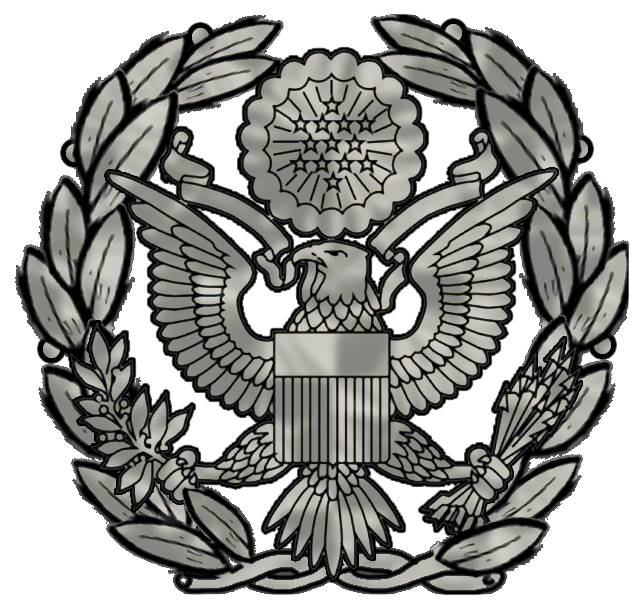
CMSAF Cap Insignia

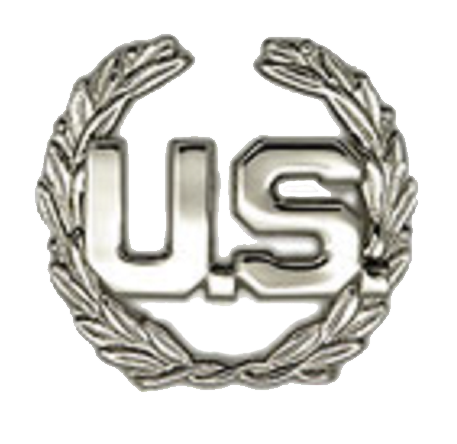
CMSAF Lapel Insignia

== List of chief master sergeants of the Air Force ==
No.	Portrait	Name	Term of office		
No.	Portrait	Name	Took office	Left office	Time in office
1		Paul W. Airey (1923–2009)	3 April 1967	31 July 1969	2 years, 119 days
2		Donald L. Harlow (1920–1997)	1 August 1969	30 September 1971	2 years, 60 days
3		Richard D. Kisling (1923–1985)	1 October 1971	30 September 1973	1 year, 364 days
4		Thomas N. Barnes (1930–2003)	1 October 1973	31 July 1977	3 years, 303 days
5		Robert Gaylor (1930–2024)	1 August 1977	31 July 1979	1 year, 364 days
6		James M. McCoy (1930–2022)	1 August 1979	31 July 1981	1 year, 364 days
7		Arthur L. Andrews (1934–1996)	1 August 1981	31 July 1983	1 year, 364 days
8		Sam Parish (1937–)	1 August 1983	30 June 1986	2 years, 333 days
9		James C. Binnicker (1938–2015)	1 July 1986	31 July 1990	4 years, 30 days
10		Gary R. Pfingston (1940–2007)	1 August 1990	25 October 1994	4 years, 85 days
11		David J. Campanale (1952–)	26 October 1994	1 November 1996	2 years, 6 days
12		Eric W. Benken (1951–)	5 November 1996	30 July 1999	2 years, 267 days
13		Frederick J. Finch (1956–)	31 July 1999	28 June 2002	2 years, 332 days
14		Gerald R. Murray (1956–)	1 July 2002	30 June 2006	3 years, 364 days
15		Rodney J. McKinley (1956–)	30 June 2006	30 June 2009	3 years, 0 days
16		James A. Roy (1964–)	1 July 2009	24 January 2013	3 years, 207 days
17		James A. Cody (1965–)	24 January 2013	17 February 2017	4 years, 24 days
18		Kaleth O. Wright (1971-)	17 February 2017	14 August 2020	3 years, 179 days
19		JoAnne S. Bass (1974-)	14 August 2020	8 March 2024	3 years, 207 days
20		David A. Flosi	8 March 2024	8 December 2025	1 year, 275 days
21		David R. Wolfe	8 December 2025	Incumbent	345 days

== See also ==
- Senior Enlisted Advisor to the Chairman
- Sergeant Major of the Army
- Command Sergeant Major of the US Army Reserve
- Sergeant Major of the Marine Corps
- Master Chief Petty Officer of the Navy
- Chief Master Sergeant of the Space Force
- Master Chief Petty Officer of the Coast Guard
- Master Chief Petty Officer of the Coast Guard Reserve Force
- Senior Enlisted Advisor for the National Guard Bureau
- National Command Chief of the Civil Air Patrol
