= Non-Commissioned Officer Professional Development Ribbon =

US Army, Air Force, and Space Force award

Noncommissioned Officer Professional Development Ribbon
- Army (above) and Air Force and Space Force (below) ribbons
- Type: Ribbon
- Awarded for: Completion of the Basic Leader Course
- Presented by: Department of the Army; Department of the Air Force
- Status: Current
- Established: 1981 (U.S. Army), 1962 (Air and Space Forces)

Precedence
- Next (higher): Armed Forces Reserve Medal
- Next (lower): Army: Army Service Ribbon; Air and Space Forces: Basic Military Training Honor Graduate Ribbon

A Noncommissioned Officer Professional Development Ribbon is an award presented by the United States Army, Air Force, and Space Force to recognize those noncommissioned officers (NCOs) who have completed a prescribed leadership course at an NCO training school. The Navy, Marine Corps, and Coast Guard have no equivalent to the Noncommissioned Officer Development Ribbon.

== Army ==
The NCO Professional Development Ribbon (established in 1981) is issued by the U.S. Army for completion of any prescribed NCO development courses. The first award of the NCO Professional Development Ribbon is issued for completion of the Basic Leader Course (BLC [former titles of BLC include: the "Warrior Leader Course", "Primary NCO Course", "Combat Army Course", and the "Primary Leadership Development Course"]). When a soldier completes additional schooling such as the Advanced Leaders Course (ALC), Senior Leaders Course (SLC), and Master Leader Course (MLC), an award numeral is worn on the ribbon to denote subsequent satisfactory completion of those courses (2, 3, & 4 respectively). Currently, the numeral "5" is authorized for graduation from the US Army Sergeant Major Academy's 'Sergeants Major Course'. Graduates of the Battle Staff NCO Course, and the legacy First Sergeant Course, do not receive a numeral device for graduation from those courses. The highest numeral authorized for the NCO Professional Development Ribbon is "6" for graduates of the Nominative Leaders Course (NLC). NLC is a two-week strategic leader development course designed to prepare nominative Command Sergeants Major (CSM) and Sergeants Major (SGM) for their duties as CSMs for commanders of 1-2 star Army commands, and Staff Section SGMs at HQDA level of responsibilities.

The Army NCO Professional Development Ribbon is a green ribbon 1 3/8 inches (35 mm) wide. It has a center strip of 1/4 inch (6 mm) of Flag Blue, bordered by 1/16 inch (2 mm) stripes of yellow. Equidistant from the edge and center stripes on each side are 1/8 inch (3 mm) stripes of yellow. The green and yellow of the ribbon represent the chevrons worn by NCOs. The central stripe of blue represents support of the United States.

== Air Force and Space Force ==
The NCO Professional Military Education Graduate Ribbon was established by the Secretary of the Air Force on 28 August 1962. The ribbon is awarded to NCOs of the US Air Force and US Space Force for completion of prescribed NCO professional development programs. Approved programs are the NCO Preparatory Course, Airman Leadership School, NCO Leadership School, NCO Academy, and Senior NCO Academy. Select professional development programs of other services may also be counted for award of the ribbon. Eligible courses are the Army Sergeants Major Academy, Navy Senior Enlisted Academy, and Coast Guard Chief Petty Officer Academy. Additional awards of the NCO Professional Military Education Graduate Ribbon are denoted by oak leaf clusters.
