= Kaleth O. Wright =

18th Chief Master Sergeant of the U.S. Air Force

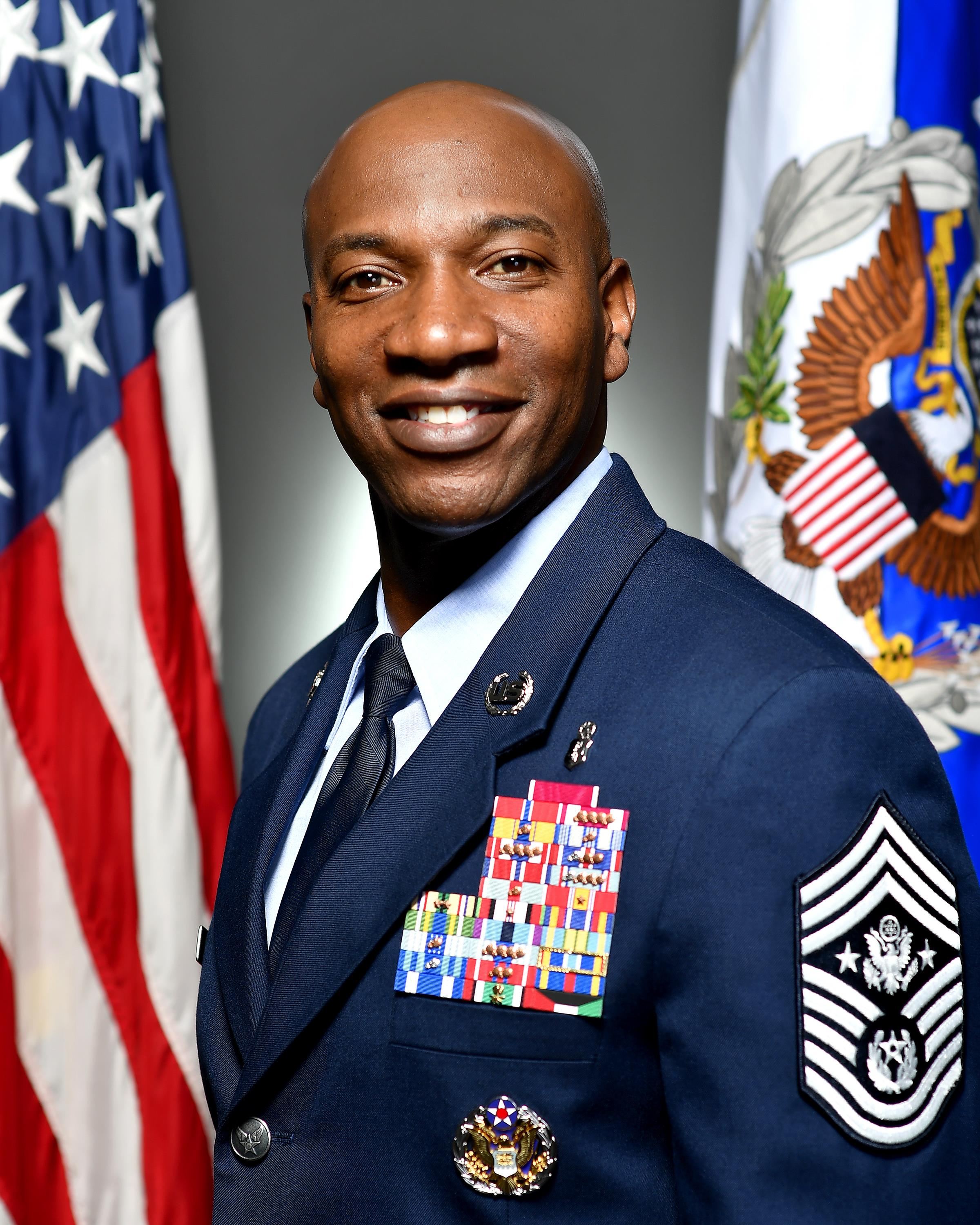
- Wright in 2017
- Born: Columbus, Georgia, United States
- Alma mater: Community College of the Air Force (AAS); University of Maryland (BS); University of Phoenix (MBA)
- Military career
- Allegiance: United States
- Branch: United States Air Force
- Service years: 1989–2020
- Rank: Chief Master Sergeant of the Air Force
- Nickname: "Enlisted Jesus"
- Conflicts: Gulf War; War in Afghanistan
- Awards: Air Force Distinguished Service Medal; Legion of Merit; Bronze Star Medal; Meritorious Service Medal (5); Air Force Commendation Medal (2); Air Force Achievement Medal (2)

Kaleth O. Wright is a retired Chief Master Sergeant in the United States Air Force who served as the 18th Chief Master Sergeant of the Air Force from February 17, 2017, to August 14, 2020. In this post he served as the personal adviser to the Chief of Staff and the Secretary of the Air Force on all issues regarding the welfare, readiness, morale, and proper utilization and progress of the enlisted force. Wright is the second African American to serve in this position. Wright is often referred to by the nickname "Enlisted Jesus" by airmen due to his successful advocacy and reforms on behalf of enlisted personnel.

== Military career ==
Wright enlisted in the United States Air Force in March 1989 and his background includes various duties in the dental career field. He served as a Professional Military Education instructor and has held various senior enlisted positions while serving at squadron, group, wing, Task-Force and Numbered Air Force levels. He has deployed in support of Operations Desert Shield/Storm and Enduring Freedom and completed overseas tours in the Republic of Korea, Japan, Germany, and Alaska. He was the Command Chief Master Sergeant, Third Air Force and 17th Expeditionary Air Force.

Prior to assuming the position of Chief Master Sergeant of the Air Force, Wright was the Command Chief Master Sergeant, United States Air Forces in Europe and Air Forces Africa, with headquarters at Ramstein Air Base, Germany. As the command chief, he was the senior enlisted advisor to the commander on all matters affecting the readiness, training, professional development and effective utilization of more than 21,000 enlisted force personnel. Additionally, he coordinated with the headquarters staff, commanders, and senior personnel on administration and implementation of command policy. The chief champions and directs enlisted theater security engagement and building partnership capacity in an area of responsibility that comprises 104 countries in support of both United States European Command and United States Africa Command.

Wright succeeded James A. Cody as Chief Master Sergeant of the Air Force on February 17, 2017. He was relieved by CMSgt JoAnne S. Bass on August 14, 2020.

== Education ==
1993 Airman Leadership School, Pope Air Force Base, N.C.
2000 Associates in Applied Science Degree, Dental Assisting, CCAF
2000 Noncommissioned Officer Academy, Kadena AB, Japan
2002 Bachelor of Science, Business Management, University of Maryland University College
2003 Associates in Applied Science Degree, Instructor of Technology/Military Science, CCAF
2005 Senior Noncommissioned Officer Academy, Maxwell AFB-Gunter Annex, AL
2007 Air Force Medical Service Intermediate Executive Skills Course
2009 Masters in Business Administration, University of Phoenix
2010 Master Certificate in Project Management, Villanova University
2010 Chief Leadership Course, Maxwell AFB-Gunter Annex, Ala.
2010 Professional Managers Certification, CCAF
2012 Gettysburg Leadership Experience, Gettysburg, Pa.
2012 Senior Enlisted Joint PME Course, National Defense University
2013 Project Management Professional (PMP) Certification, Project Management Institute
2013 Enterprise Leadership Seminar, Darden School of Business, University of Virginia
2014 Keystone Command Senior Enlisted Leader Course, National Defense University, Washington, DC
2014 AFSO21 Executive Leaders Course, University of Tennessee
2014 USAF Air War College via Correspondence, Air University
2015 Leadership Development Program, Center for Creative Leadership, Colorado Springs, CO
2016 Graduate Certificate in Executive Leadership, Cornell University

== Assignments ==
1. September 1989 – June 1994, Dental Assistant Specialist, 317th (later 23rd) Medical Group, Pope AFB, N.C.
2. July 1994 – July 1995, Dental Assistant Journeyman, 51st Dental Squadron, Osan AB, Korea
3. August 1995 – August 2001, NCOIC, Preventive Dentistry/Records and Reception/Oral and Maxillofacial Surgery/Dental Readiness, 18th Dental Squadron, Kadena AB, Japan
4. August 2001 – August 2004, Flight Chief, Training/Evaluation, Kisling NCOA, Kapaun AS, Germany
5. September 2004 – February 2007, Flight Chief, Dental Flight, 43rd ADOS, Pope AFB, N.C.
6. February 2007 – February 2009, Superintendent, 51st Dental Squadron, Osan AB, Republic of Korea
7. February 2009 – July 2010, Superintendent, 3rd Dental Squadron, Elmendorf AFB, Alaska
8. July 2010 – May 2011, Superintendent, 18th Dental Squadron, Kadena AB, Japan
9. May 2011 – May 2012, Superintendent, 18th Mission Support Group, Kadena AB, Japan
10. May 2012 – February 2014, Command Chief Master Sergeant, 22d Air Refueling Wing, McConnell AFB, Kansas
11. February 2014 – December 2014, Command Chief Master Sergeant, 9th Air and Space Expeditionary Task Force-Afghanistan, Kabul, Afghanistan
12. January 2015 – June 2016, Command Chief Master Sergeant, 3rd Air Force and 17th Expeditionary Air Force, Ramstein AB, Germany
13. June 2016 – January 2017, Command Chief Master Sergeant, U.S. Air Forces in Europe, U.S. Air Forces Africa, Ramstein AB, Germany
14. February 2017 – August 2020, Chief Master Sergeant of the Air Force, The Pentagon, Washington, D.C.

== Awards and decorations ==
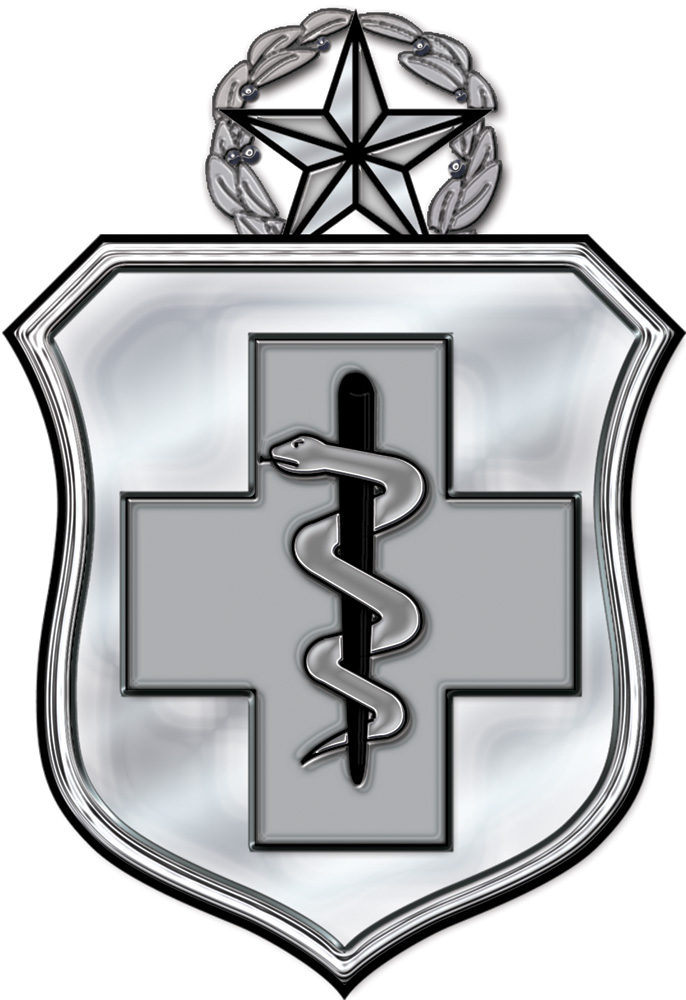
Master Enlisted Medical Badge
Headquarters Air Force Badge

Personal decorations
	Air Force Distinguished Service Medal
Width-44 crimson ribbon with a pair of width-2 white stripes on the edges	Legion of Merit
	Bronze Star Medal
Width-44 crimson ribbon with two width-8 white stripes at distance 4 from the edges.	Meritorious Service Medal with four bronze oak leaf clusters
	Air Force Commendation Medal with oak leaf cluster
	Air Force Achievement Medal with oak leaf cluster
Unit awards
	Air Force Meritorious Unit Award with four oak leaf clusters
	Air Force Outstanding Unit Award with silver and two bronze oak leaf clusters
	Organizational Excellence Award
Service awards
	Air Force Good Conduct Medal with one silver and three bronze oak leaf clusters
	Air Force Good Conduct Medal (second ribbon to denote tenth award)
	Air Force Recognition Ribbon with oak leaf cluster
Campaign and service medals
Width=44 scarlet ribbon with a central width-4 golden yellow stripe, flanked by pairs of width-1 scarlet, white, Old Glory blue, and white stripes	National Defense Service Medal with one bronze service star
	Southwest Asia Service Medal with two service stars
	Afghanistan Campaign Medal with service star
	Global War on Terrorism Service Medal
	Korea Defense Service Medal
	Humanitarian Service Medal
	Military Outstanding Volunteer Service Medal
Service, training, and marksmanship awards
	Air Force Overseas Short Tour Service Ribbon with bronze oak leaf cluster
	Air Force Overseas Long Tour Service Ribbon with four oak leaf clusters
	Air Force Expeditionary Service Ribbon with gold border
	Air Force Longevity Service Award with silver and bronze oak leaf clusters
	NCO Professional Military Education Graduate Ribbon with two bronze oak leaf clusters
	Air Force Training Ribbon
International and foreign awards
	NATO Medal for service with ISAF
	Kuwait Liberation Medal (Saudi Arabia)
	Kuwait Liberation Medal (Kuwait)

=== Other achievements ===
1997 18th Dental Squadron NCO of the Year
1998 18th Dental Squadron NCO of the Year
2000 18th Dental Squadron NCO of the Year
2000 PACAF Outstanding Dental NCO of the Year
2000 USAF Outstanding Dental NCO of the Year
2000 John L. Levitow and Academic Achievement Awards, Kadena NCOA
2005 43rd AW and Pope AFB SNCO of the Year
2005 AMC Outstanding Dental SNCO of the Year

Military offices
Preceded by James A. Cody	Chief Master Sergeant of the Air Force; 2017–2020	Succeeded by JoAnne S. Bass
