= JoAnne S. Bass =

Retired United States Air Force senior noncommissioned officer

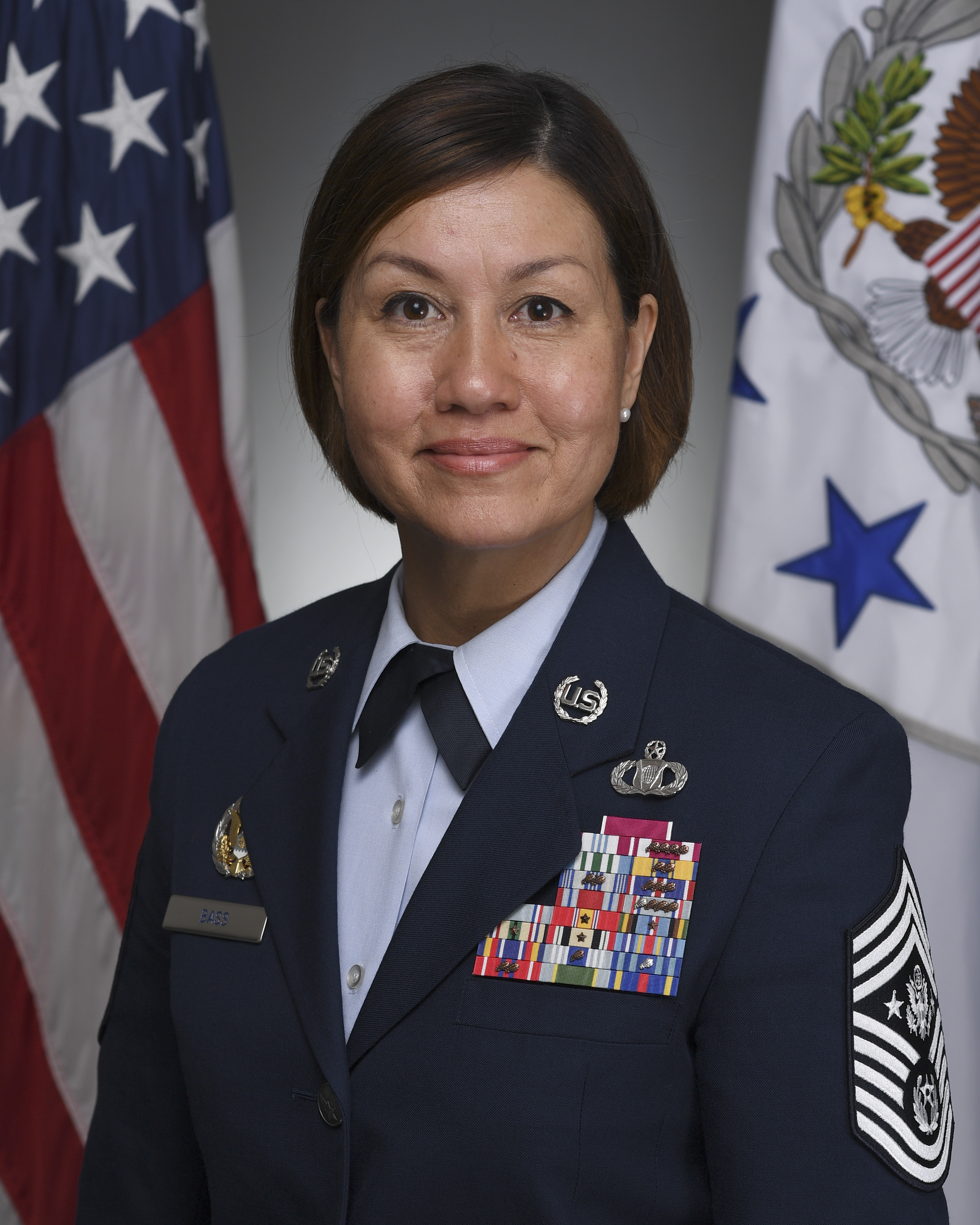
- Bass in 2020
- Born: 1973 or 1974 (age 51–52); Puyallup, Washington, U.S.
- Education: Community College of the Air Force (AAS); Embry-Riddle Aeronautical University (BS)
- Military career
- Allegiance: United States
- Branch: United States Air Force
- Service years: 1993–2024
- Rank: Chief Master Sergeant of the Air Force
- Conflicts: Operation Southern Watch; Operation Enduring Freedom; Operation Iraqi Freedom
- Awards: Defense Distinguished Service Medal; Legion of Merit; Defense Meritorious Service Medal; Meritorious Service Medal (5); Joint Service Commendation Medal; Air Force Commendation Medal (3); Air Force Achievement Medal (3)
- JoAnne S. Bass's voice Bass's opening statement at a House Armed Services Military Personnel Subcommittee hearing on the state of enlisted personnel Recorded 9 March 2023

JoAnne S. Bass (/bæs/; born c. 1974) is a retired Chief Master Sergeant in the United States Air Force who served as the 19th Chief Master Sergeant of the Air Force from 14 August 2020 to 8 March 2024. She was the first woman to serve as the senior enlisted leader of a United States military service and the first person of Asian American descent to serve as the Air Force's top enlisted leader. Before assuming the office, she served as command chief master sergeant of Second Air Force at Keesler Air Force Base in Mississippi. After retiring from the Air Force, she continued work in leadership, education, national security, and workforce development through roles including strategic advisor for Columbia Southern University, ambassador for Hiring Our Heroes, and adjunct senior fellow at the Center for a New American Security.

== Early life ==
Bass was born in Puyallup, Washington, and grew up in a military family. Her mother is Korean, and her father served as a warrant officer in the United States Army. Because of her father's assignments, she lived in several stateside and overseas locations during childhood, including Mainz and Heidelberg in Germany, before her family settled in Mililani, Hawaii, where she graduated from high school.

== Military career ==
Bass entered the United States Air Force in March 1993 as an aviation resource management specialist. She later reflected that she had originally expected to serve only one enlistment, but said that deployments, demanding assignments, and the example of the people she served alongside transformed that plan into a career rooted in purpose.

Bass began her Air Force career in aviation resource management at Pope Air Force Base, North Carolina, and later served with the 24th Special Tactics Squadron at Fort Bragg. She has described that assignment as a turning point and an experience that shaped her understanding of leadership, culture, and accountability. It was there, and in the years that followed, that she developed the leadership philosophy that would define much of her career: credibility matters, every assignment prepares you for the next, and service is ultimately about something larger than oneself.

Over the next two decades, Bass served in a series of increasingly senior enlisted roles in both the United States and Europe. Her assignments included multiple tours at Ramstein Air Base, where she rose to superintendent of the 86th Operations Group, as well as command-level leadership positions at Goodfellow Air Force Base, the Pentagon, and Keesler Air Force Base. Her career reflected a combination of operational experience, special operations credibility, training and education, and enterprise-level leadership, developed across squadron, group, wing, and major command assignments.

In August 2020, Bass became the 19th Chief Master Sergeant of the Air Force, making history as the first woman and the first person of Asian American descent to serve as the Air Force’s highest-ranking enlisted leader. In that role, she served as the principal adviser to the Chief of Staff and Secretary of the Air Force on issues affecting the welfare, readiness, morale, and proper utilization of the enlisted force. She consistently framed her priorities around people, readiness, and culture—arguing that leadership, trust, respect, and development were inseparable from combat effectiveness and the future relevance of the force.

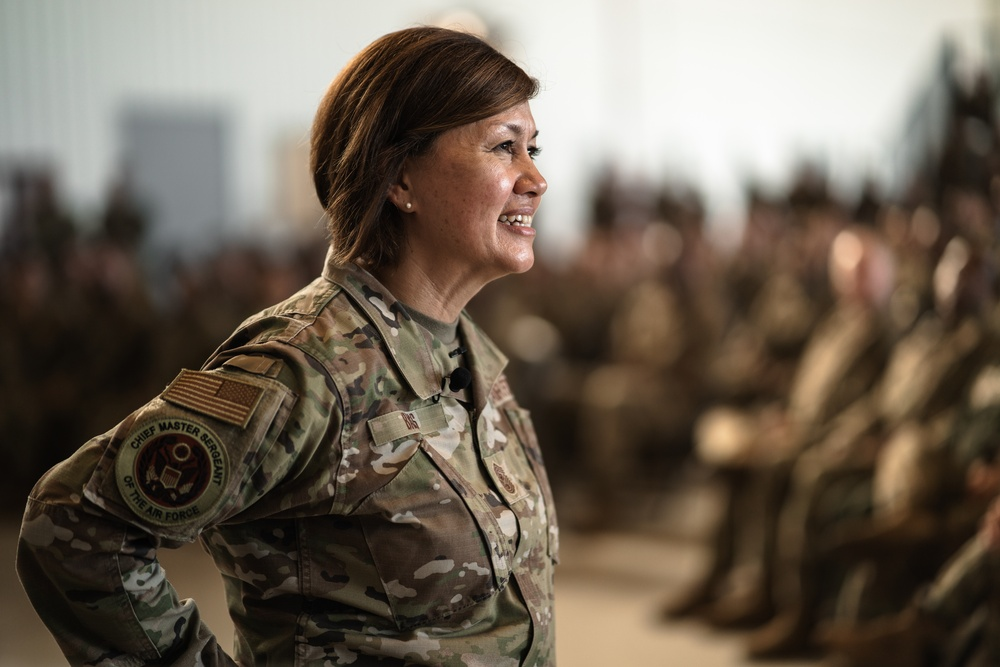
Chief Master Sgt. of the Air Force JoAnne S. Bass speaks to Airmen during an all-call at MacDill Air Force Base, Florida, on 4 August 2022.

Her tenure as Chief Master Sergeant of the Air Force was marked by sustained emphasis on enlisted development, quality of life, force culture, and the need for leaders to adapt to a changing information environment. She spoke frequently about the responsibility of leaders to be transparent, to take accountability, and to prepare service members not only for current demands but for the challenges of the decades ahead. Across speeches, interviews, and official engagements, Bass reinforced the idea that culture is not incidental to mission success—it is foundational to it.

Bass served as Chief Master Sergeant of the Air Force until 8 March 2024, when she was succeeded by David A. Flosi and retired from the Air Force.

=== Social media and public communication ===
As Chief Master Sergeant of the Air Force, Bass made frequent use of official social media to communicate directly with airmen and their families and to comment on issues affecting force culture. She said she used social media to hear directly about problems in the service, including issues that did not always surface through traditional channels. Her use of these platforms reflected a broader shift among senior military leaders toward direct online engagement with service members, even as the Air Force and other institutions continued to navigate questions of moderation, professionalism, and public discourse on official accounts. Bass also linked online behavior to broader questions of professionalism, readiness, and culture. In October 2020, after online harassment directed at Staff Sgt. Heather Fejerang and Capt. Monica Clements, Bass wrote that "Respect is non-negotiable" and argued that respect among airmen extends to their conduct on social media. In a 2022 article in Æther: A Journal of Strategic Airpower & Spacepower, and later in remarks at the Air & Space Forces Association conference, she described the information environment as a battlespace that "can no longer be ignored" because it affects the Air Force's people, readiness, and culture.

In October 2020, Bass drew attention after responding to repeated Facebook comments about how to pronounce her surname. Although the original question came from an enlisted airman, Bass later wrote that he and others had asked it across multiple posts, which she characterized as trolling. After speaking with the airman, she wrote that his question had been "simple and honest," but that having him and others repeat it across multiple posts was trolling.

In January 2021, Bass shared a post on her official Facebook page highlighting an airman's efforts to help other single parents. The post drew criticism over how it characterized the airman's ex-husband. Bass later removed the post and apologized, writing that it had been her "blind spot" because she had not considered how the commentary could be viewed "from a father or a husband's point of view". Task & Purpose reported that Bass personally called both airmen involved to apologize and said she would continue using social media to connect with airmen and highlight their work.

In a separate dispute arising from her official Facebook page, retired Air Force Maj. Richard Rynearson was blocked in November 2020 after posting comments critical of Air Force policies. Rynearson later sued, alleging that the ban violated the First Amendment. In 2022, a court-approved settlement restored his access to the page and required the Air Force to revise its social media comment policy to state that posts would not be removed, and users would not be banned, based on viewpoint.

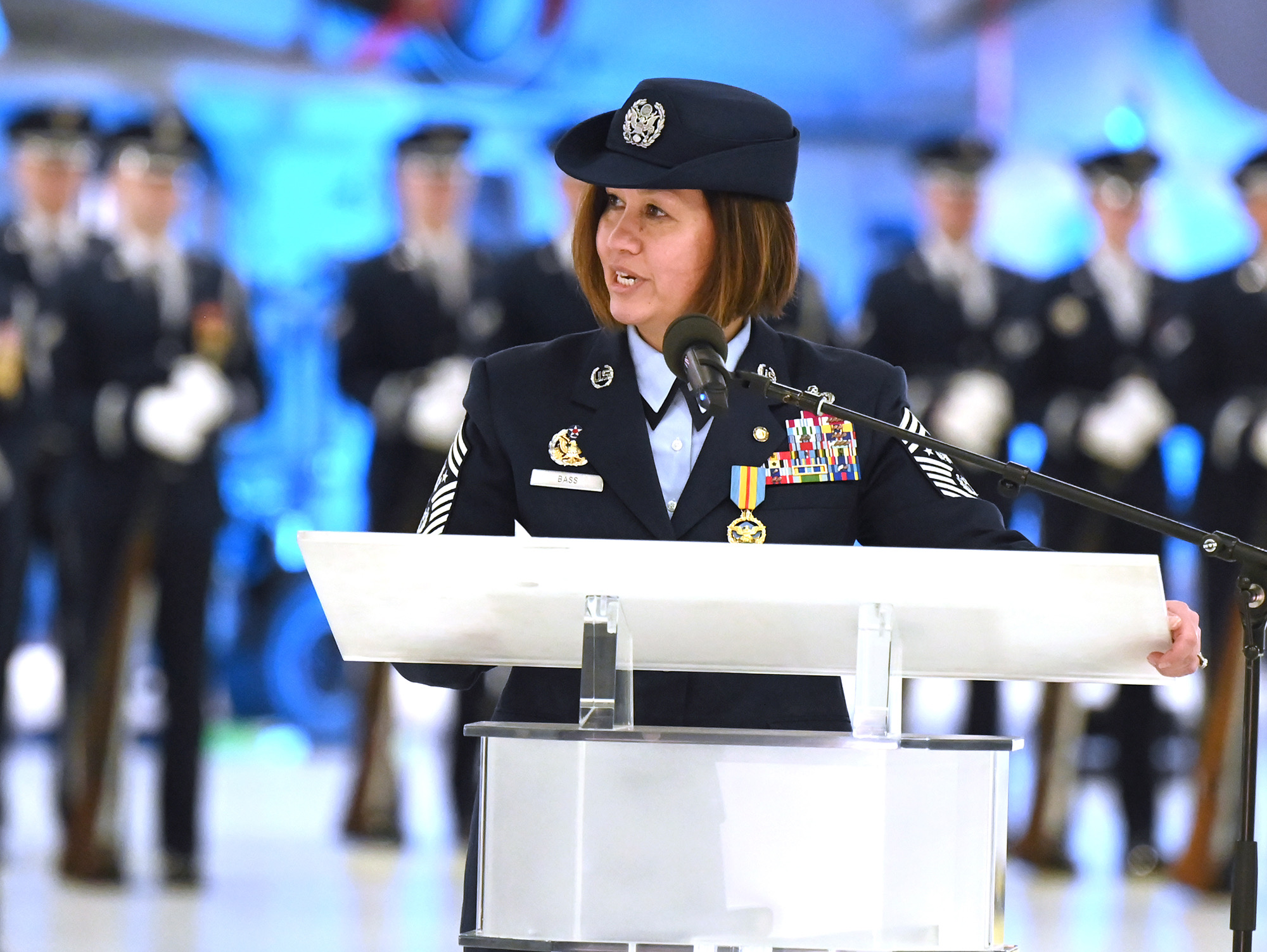
Retired Chief Master Sergeant of the Air Force JoAnne S. Bass addresses the audience during the Chief Master Sergeant of the Air Force change of responsibility ceremony at Joint Base Andrews, Maryland, on 8 March 2024.

== Post-military career ==
After retiring from the Air Force in March 2024, Bass continued her work in leadership, education, national security, and workforce development. She joined Columbia Southern University as a strategic advisor for government, military, and community relations, where she supports institutional strategy, global engagement, and workforce-aligned education initiatives. She also became involved in veteran employment and transition efforts through Hiring Our Heroes, while expanding her advisory work across industry, academia, and nonprofit organizations.

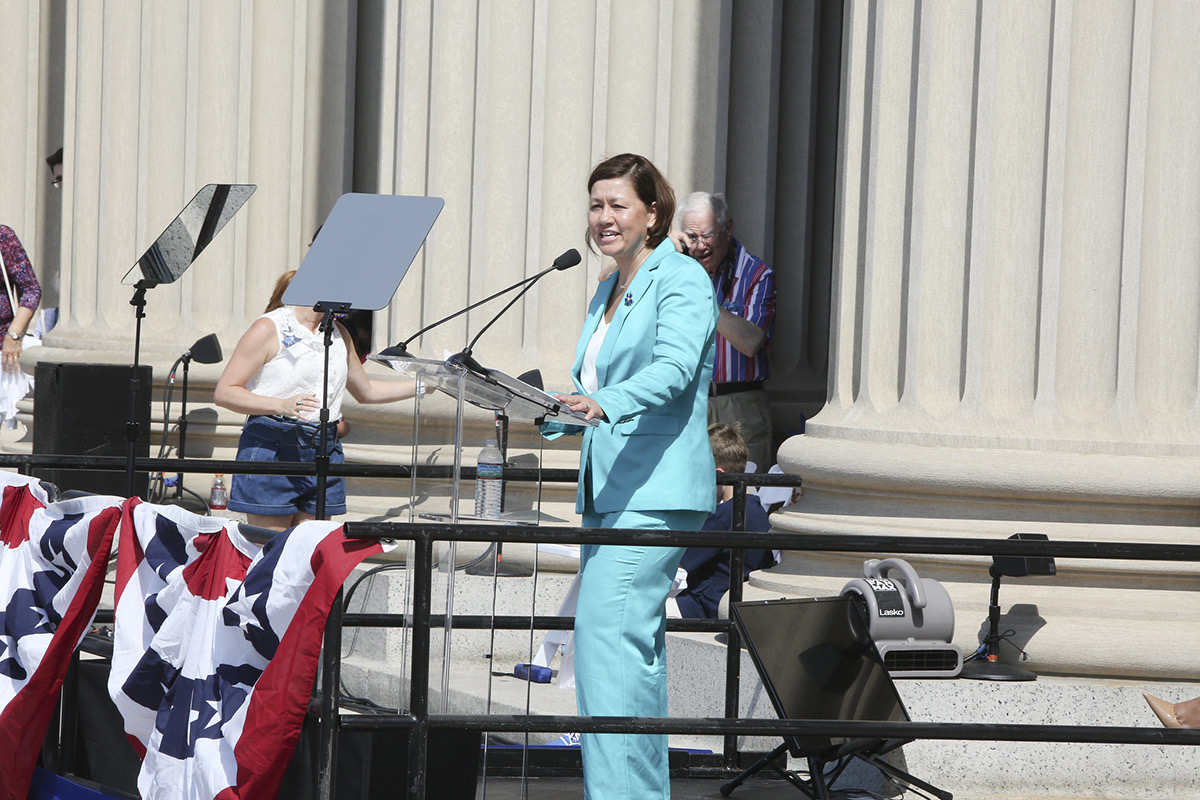
Bass speaks during the 4 July 2024 program at the National Archives in Washington, D.C.

In her post-military career, Bass has engaged with senior leaders across corporate, academic, government, and policy environments on issues including leadership at scale, organizational culture, workforce readiness, and national security. Her experience leading and advising large, complex organizations has positioned her as a voice on how institutions adapt, compete, and build resilient teams in rapidly changing environments. Her work reflects a cross-sector approach, connecting military leadership principles with enterprise strategy, talent development, and long-term organizational effectiveness.

In public life after retirement, Bass has remained focused on the same themes that shaped her military career: leadership, service, accountability, and the long-term development of people and institutions. Whether speaking to military, corporate, or academic audiences, she continues to draw on more than three decades of service to emphasize that effective leadership—grounded in trust, character, and connection—is central to organizational success in any domain.

== Education ==
- 1997 Airman Leadership School, Pope Air Force Base, North Carolina
- 2000 Associate degree, Airport Resource Management, Community College of the Air Force
- 2004 Noncommissioned Officer Academy, Kapaun Air Station, Germany
- 2005 Bachelor of Science in Professional Aeronautics, Embry–Riddle Aeronautical University, Prescott
- 2006 Senior Noncommissioned Officer Academy, Course 12, by distance learning
- 2007 Senior Enlisted Joint Professional Military Education, by distance learning
- 2009 Senior Noncommissioned Officer Academy, Maxwell Air Force Base, Alabama
- 2013 Air Mobility Command Leadership Challenge Program, Ramstein Air Base, Germany
- 2013 Chief Master Sergeant Leadership Seminar, Ramstein Air Base, Germany
- 2015 AFSO21 Executive Leadership Seminar, University of Tennessee, Nashville, Tennessee
- 2015 USAF Enterprise Leadership Seminar, UNC Kenan–Flagler Business School, University of North Carolina, Chapel Hill
- 2016 Senior Enlisted Joint Professional Military Education II, by distance learning
- 2017 Keystone Command Senior Enlisted Leader Course, National Defense University, Washington, D.C.
- 2018 Leading Strategically, Center for Creative Leadership, Colorado Springs, Colorado
- 2018 Coaching for Greater Effectiveness, Center for Creative Leadership, Greensboro, North Carolina

== Assignments ==
1. June 1993 – June 1996, Operations System Management Journeyman, 74th Fighter Squadron, Pope Air Force Base, North Carolina
2. June 1996 – July 1998, Range Scheduling Specialist, 43rd Operations Support Squadron, Pope Air Force Base, North Carolina
3. July 1998 – November 2000, Noncommissioned Officer in Charge, Current Operations Scheduler, 24th Special Tactics Squadron, Fort Bragg, North Carolina
4. November 2000 – March 2001, Current Operations Scheduler, 86th Operational Support Squadron, Ramstein Air Base, Germany
5. March 2001 – January 2004, Noncommissioned Officer in Charge, Special Airlift Operations, Air Mobility Operations Control Center, Ramstein Air Base, Germany
6. January 2004 – November 2005, Noncommissioned Officer in Charge, Host Aviation Resource Management, 86th Operational Support Squadron, Ramstein Air Base, Germany
7. November 2005 – August 2010, Superintendent, Host Aviation Resource Management, Group Career Field Functional Manager, (Data Masked)
8. August 2010 – September 2012, Superintendent, Host Aviation Resource Management and Superintendent, 86th Operations Support Squadron, Ramstein Air Base, Germany
9. September 2012 – May 2015, Superintendent, 86th Operations Group, Ramstein Air Base, Germany
10. May 2015 – September 2016, Command Chief Master Sergeant, 17th Training Wing, Goodfellow Air Force Base, Texas
11. September 2016 – July 2018, Chief, Air Force Enlisted Developmental Education, The Pentagon, Washington, D.C.
12. July 2018 – August 2020, Command Chief Master Sergeant, Second Air Force, Keesler Air Force Base, Mississippi
13. August 2020 – March 2024, Chief Master Sergeant of the Air Force, The Pentagon, Washington, D.C.

== Awards and decorations ==
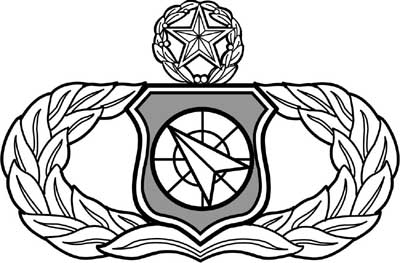
Air Force Master Command and Control Badge
Headquarters Air Force Badge

Personal decorations
	Defense Distinguished Service Medal
Width-44 crimson ribbon with a pair of width-2 white stripes on the edges	Legion of Merit
	Defense Meritorious Service Medal
Width-44 crimson ribbon with two width-8 white stripes at distance 4 from the edges.	Meritorious Service Medal with four bronze oak leaf clusters
	Joint Service Commendation Medal
	Air Force Commendation Medal with two oak leaf clusters
	Air Force Achievement Medal with two oak leaf clusters
Unit awards
	Air Force Outstanding Unit Award with three oak leaf clusters
Service awards
	Combat Readiness Medal
	Air Force Good Conduct Medal with one silver and four bronze oak leaf clusters
Campaign and service medals
Width=44 scarlet ribbon with a central width-4 golden yellow stripe, flanked by pairs of width-1 scarlet, white, Old Glory blue, and white stripes	National Defense Service Medal with one bronze campaign star
	Armed Forces Expeditionary Medal with bronze service star
	Southwest Asia Service Medal with bronze service star
	Iraq Campaign Medal with bronze service star
	Global War on Terrorism Expeditionary Medal
	Global War on Terrorism Service Medal
Service, training, and marksmanship awards
	Air Force Overseas Long Tour Service Ribbon with oak leaf cluster
	Air Force Longevity Service Award with silver and bronze oak leaf clusters
	NCO Professional Military Education Graduate Ribbon with two oak leaf clusters
	Small Arms Expert Marksmanship Ribbon
	Air Force Training Ribbon

== Honors and recognition ==
- U.S. Veterans Hall of Fame — Class of 2025: Selected for induction in recognition of lifelong service, leadership, and enduring contributions to the veteran community.
- SHRM 2024 Legend in Leadership Award: Recognized for exceptional impact on workforce leadership and for breaking barriers as the first woman to serve as the senior enlisted leader of a U.S. military service.
- MIGHTY 25 — 2024': Named among We Are The Mightys “Mighty 25,” honoring influential leaders shaping the military and veteran community.
- PenFed Foundation 2022 Military Hero Award: Honored at the nationally recognized Night of Heroes Gala for extraordinary service and impact in support of the military community.
- Army & Air Force Exchange Service (AAFES) Inaugural Warfighter Quality of Life Champion Award — 2022: Recognized for advancing the well-being and quality of life of service members and their families across the Department of Defense.

Military offices
Preceded by Kaleth O. Wright	Chief Master Sergeant of the Air Force; 2020–2024	Succeeded by David A. Flosi
