= David R. Wolfe =

US Air Force officer

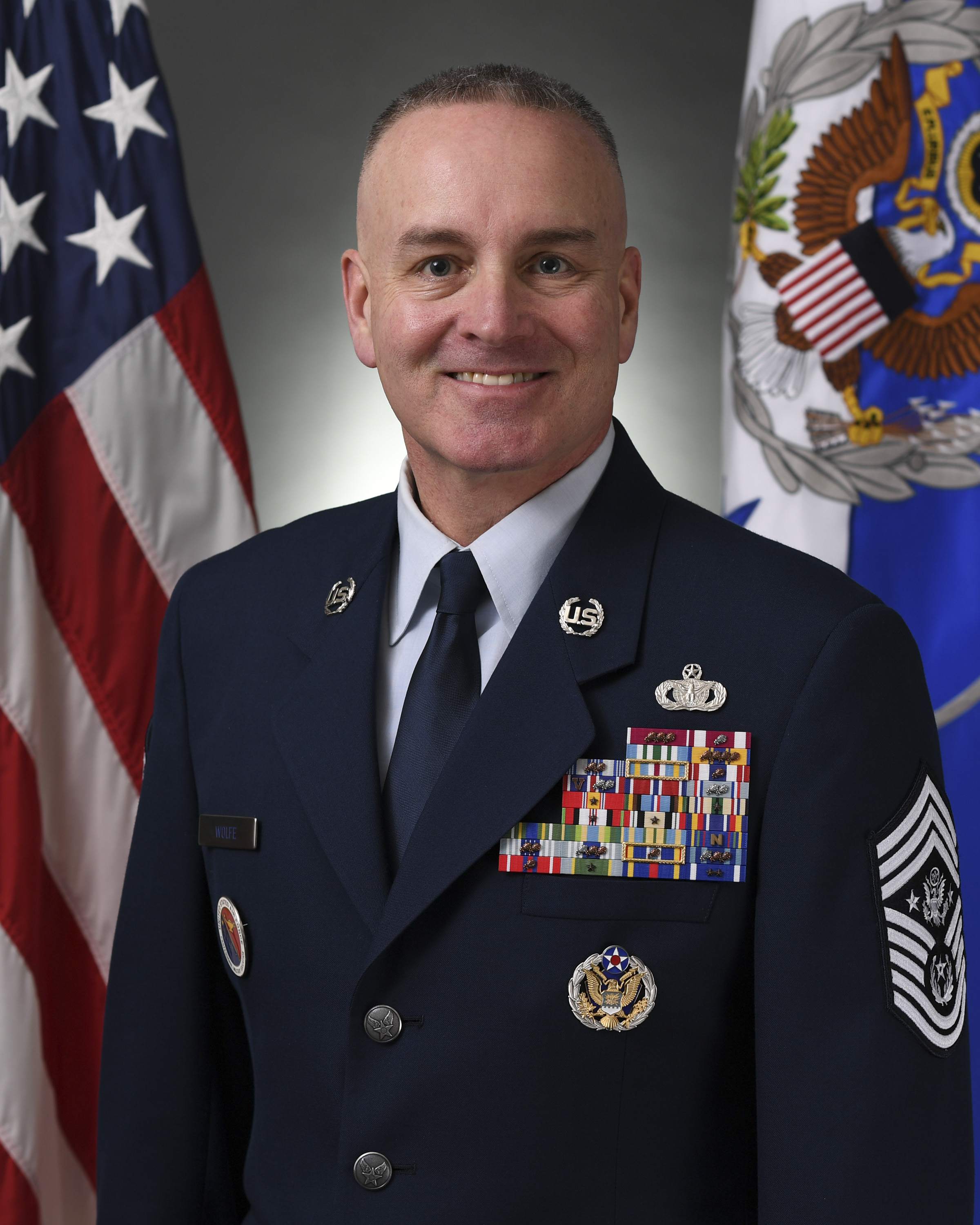
- Wolfe in 2026
- Education: Wayland Baptist University; University of Charleston; Virginia Tech
- Military career
- Allegiance: United States
- Branch: United States Air Force
- Service years: 1992–present
- Rank: Chief Master Sergeant of the Air Force
- Conflicts: War in Afghanistan; Iraq War
- Awards: Legion of Merit (4); Meritorious Service Medal (6)

David R. Wolfe is a senior noncommissioned officer in the United States Air Force, who has served as the 21st Chief Master Sergeant of the Air Force since December 8, 2025. Wolfe has served in the U.S. Air Force since enlisting in 1992, serving mainly as a Security Forces Airman, which is the U.S. Air Force version of military police. He succeeded Chief Master Sergeant of the Air Force David A. Flosi, who announced his retirement in September 2025 due to the death of his wife.

Wolfe served in a number of joint assignments with other U.S. military services. He deployed in support of Operations Southern Watch, Iraqi Freedom, and Inherent Resolve.

== Early career ==
In July 1992, Airman Wolfe was stationed at F.E. Warren Air Force Base received nonjudicial punishment under Article 15 of the Uniform Code of Military Justice for an undisclosed infraction. Only one year later, Airman 1st Class Wolfe was the 321st Missile Squadron Airman of the Year.

== Chief Master Sergeant of the Air Force ==
Wolfe sees China as the most important threat to the United States currently.

In February 2026, Wolfe testified to the Senate Armed Services Subcommittee stating that airmen's quality of life including childcare and housing is a national security and readiness issue.

== Controversies ==
On January 30, 2026, CMSAF Wolfe and the USAF Chief of Staff issued a memo instructing Air Force Security personnel manning the base gates to use, “Professional greetings—at installation entry control points and throughout interactions with the public." This quickly opened up the airmen to ridicule with both airmen and civilians saying that the greetings were unneeded and "dumb."

== Education ==
Wolfe was the distinguished graduate of the Airman Leadership School in Aviano, Italy in 1997. He completed his associates of police science from the Community College of the Air Force in 1999, a Bachelor of Science in criminal justice from Wayland Baptist University in 2004, a masters of strategic leadership from University of Charleston in 2018 and a second masters of political science from Virginia Tech in 2020.

== Assignments and achievements ==
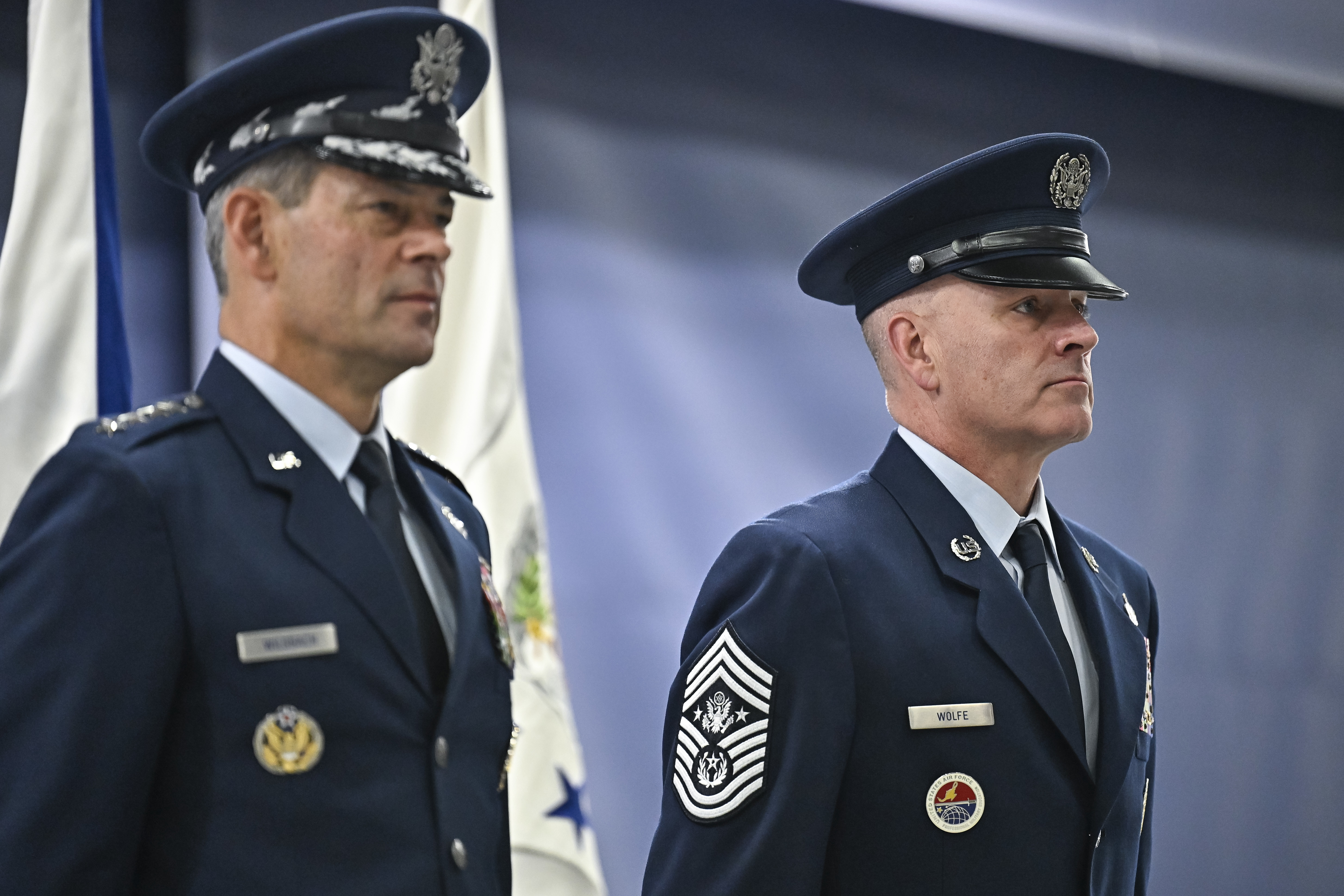
Wolfe and Air Force Chief of Staff, General Kenneth S. Wilsbach, stand during Wolfe's assumption of responsibility ceremony on Joint Base Andrews, December 8, 2025.

CMSAF Wolfe joined the Air Force in 1992 attending Basic Military Training at Lackland Air Force Base. He became a Security Forces Airman and was stationed at Warren AFB, King Abdul Aziz Air Base, Ramstein AB, Naples, Italy, Clear Air Force Station, and Elmendorf AFB. As a Noncommissioned Officer, he would be the 11th Air Force Senior Noncommissioned Officer of the Year in 2008. He would continue to be promoted, rising to Command Chief Master Sergeant, 3rd Wing in 2016 and Senior Enlisted Leader, Alaskan North American Aerospace Defense Command Region and Alaskan Command in 2018 among other assignments.

== Awards and decorations ==
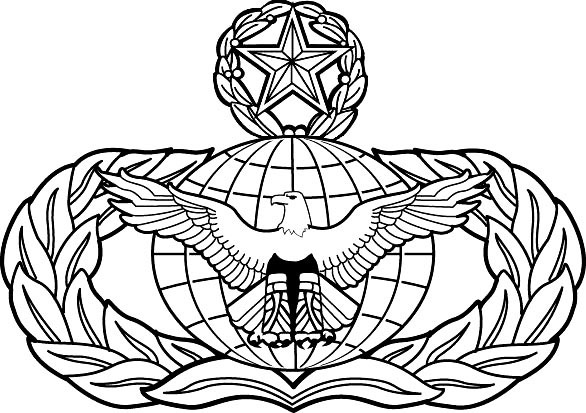

Air Force Master Force Protection Badge
Headquarters Air Force Badge

Personal decorations
Width-44 crimson ribbon with a pair of width-2 white stripes on the edges	Legion of Merit with three bronze oak leaf clusters
Width-44 crimson ribbon with two width-8 white stripes at distance 4 from the edges.	Meritorious Service Medal with one silver oak leaf clusters
	Joint Service Commendation Medal
	Air and Space Commendation Medal with four oak leaf clusters
	Air and Space Achievement Medal with two oak leaf clusters
Unit awards
	Joint Meritorious Unit Award
	Meritorious Unit Award (Air and Space Forces)
	Air Force Outstanding Unit Award with two silver oak leaf clusters and V device
	Air and Space Organizational Excellence Award
Service awards
	Air Force Good Conduct Medal with two silver oak leaf clusters
Campaign and service medals
Width=44 scarlet ribbon with a central width-4 golden yellow stripe, flanked by pairs of width-1 scarlet, white, Old Glory blue, and white stripes	National Defense Service Medal with one bronze campaign star
	Armed Forces Expeditionary Medal
	Southwest Asia Service Medal with bronze service star
	Afghanistan Campaign Medal with bronze service star
	Iraq Campaign Medal with bronze service star
	Global War on Terrorism Service Medal
	Korea Defense Service Medal
	Armed Forces Service Medal
	Military Outstanding Volunteer Service Medal
	Nuclear Deterrence Operations Service Medal with N device
Service, training and marksman awards
	Air and Space Overseas Short Tour Service Ribbon with two bronze oak leaf clusters
	Air and Space Overseas Long Tour Service Ribbon with one silver and two bronze oak leaf cluster
	Air and Space Expeditionary Service Ribbon with one bronze oak leaf cluster and gold frame
	Air and Space Longevity Service Award with silver and two bronze oak leaf clusters
	NCO Professional Military Education Graduate Ribbon with one oak leaf cluster
	Small Arms Expert Marksmanship Ribbon with bronze star device
	Air and Space Training Ribbon
	NATO Medal with two bronze star devices

== Personal life ==
Wolfe is married to Dr. Doniel Wolfe, who he met in Cheyenne, Wyoming, and has one daughter and grandchildren. He is the son of Army Air Corps and U.S. Air Force Staff Sergeant Thomas R. Wolfe, a combat photographer with the 6th Photographic Technical Squadron, who documented the aftermath of the atomic bomb tests as well as photographs in both Hiroshima and Nagasaki after the bombings.

Military offices
Preceded by David A. Flosi	Chief Master Sergeant of the Air Force; 2025–present	Incumbent
