= David A. Flosi =

20th Chief Master Sergeant of the U.S. Air Force

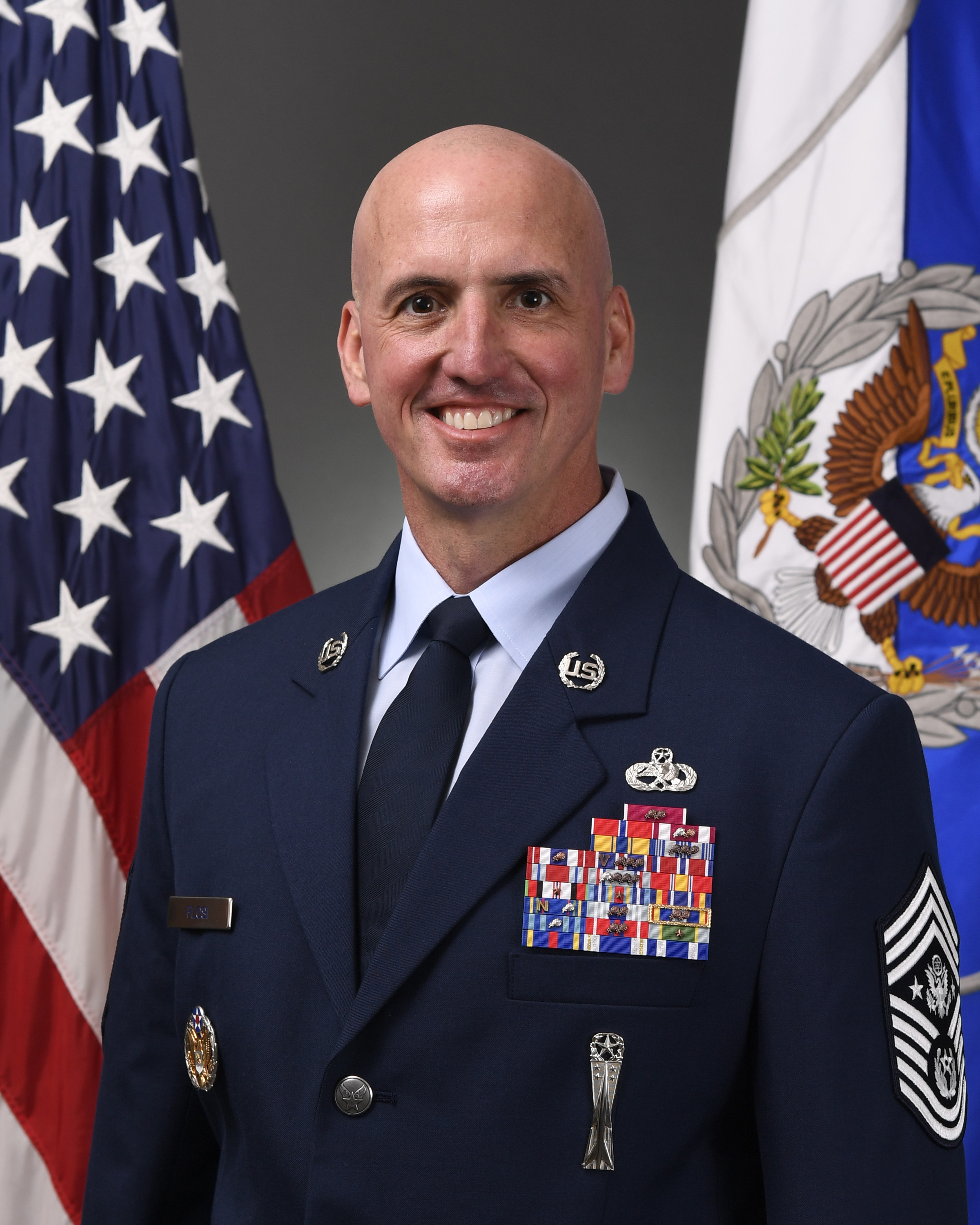
- Flosi in 2024
- Education: Embry-Riddle Aeronautical University (BSc); Air Force Institute of Technology (MSc)
- Military career
- Allegiance: United States
- Branch: United States Air Force
- Service years: 1996–2025
- Rank: Chief Master Sergeant of the Air Force
- Conflicts: Iraq War; War in Afghanistan
- Awards: Legion of Merit (3); Bronze Star Medal; Meritorious Service Medal (7); Air and Space Commendation Medal; Air and Space Achievement Medal (4)

David A. Flosi is a retired senior noncommissioned officer of the United States Air Force. He served as the 20th chief master sergeant of the Air Force from 8 March 2024 to 8 December 2025.

From October 2021 to February 2024, Flosi was the command chief master sergeant of Air Force Materiel Command at Wright-Patterson Air Force Base in Dayton, Ohio.

Flosi joined the air force in May 1996 as a nuclear weapons specialist. His career included deployments for Operation Southern Watch, Operation Iraqi Freedom, Operation Inherent Resolve, and Operation Freedom's Sentinel.

== Education ==
Flosi attended the Airman Leadership School at Spangdahlem Air Base, Germany, in 2000. He obtained an Associate of Applied Science in Munitions Systems Technology from the Community College of the Air Force in 2001 and a Bachelor of Science in Professional Aeronautics from Embry-Riddle Aeronautical University, Worldwide Campus, in 2003.

In 2007, Flosi completed the U.S. Air Force Europe Noncommissioned Officer Academy at Kapaun Air Station, Germany. He obtained a Master of Science in Logistics and Supply Chain Management at the Air Force Institute of Technology, Ohio, in 2010. The following year, he graduated from the Senior Noncommissioned Officer Academy at Maxwell AFB, Alabama. He holds a Professional Manager Certification from the Community College of the Air Force, which he obtained in 2013. In 2016, he completed Personnel Recovery Planning training at the Joint Personnel Recovery Education and Training Center, and also completed both the Senior Enlisted Joint Professional Military Education I and II programs via distance learning in 2016 and 2017, respectively.

Additional programs include Leading Strategically at the Center for Creative Leadership in Colorado Springs, Colorado, in 2018, and the Keystone Command Senior Enlisted Leader Course at the National Defense University, Washington D.C., in the same year. In 2020, he participated in the USAF Enterprise Leadership Seminar at the Kenan-Flager Business School, University of North Carolina, Chapel Hill. In 2021, he attended the National and International Security Leadership Seminar with Alan L. Freed Associates in Washington D.C.

== Assignments ==
Flosi enlisted in the United States Air Force in May 1996, was a student at Basic Military Training at Lackland AFB, Texas, and subsequently attended the Nuclear Weapons Technician Course at Sheppard AFB, Texas, from June to September 1996. His first assignment, from September 1996 to November 1999, was a Munitions Maintenance Team Member with the 898th Munitions Squadron at Kirtland AFB, New Mexico.

In November 1999, he transitioned to Germany, serving as Team Chief for the 852nd Munitions Support Squadron at Büchel AB until October 2003. During this period, he was deployed to Saudi Arabia from February to June 2003 as Noncommissioned Officer in Charge of the Escort Control Center for the 363rd Expeditionary Civil Engineering Squadron at Prince Sultan AB.

From October 2003 to June 2006, he served as the Command Weapons Storage and Security System Program Manager at Headquarters USAFE, Ramstein AB, Germany. Following this, he became the Noncommissioned Officer in Charge of Munitions Maintenance for the 704th Munitions Support Squadron at Ghedi Air Base, Italy, from June 2006 to August 2008.

Between August 2008 and March 2010, Flosi pursued advanced education as a student at the Graduate School of Engineering and Management, Air Force Institute of Technology, Wright-Patterson AFB, Ohio. He then returned to active operations as Special Weapons Flight Chief and Superintendent with the 898th Munitions Squadron at Kirtland AFB, New Mexico, from March 2010 to December 2012.

From December 2012 to April 2015, he served as Integrated Maintenance Superintendent for the 705th Munitions Squadron at Minot AFB, North Dakota. He then became superintendent of the 341st Munitions Squadron at Malmstrom AFB, Montana, a role he held from April to December 2015. Flosi continued at Malmstrom AFB as superintendent of the 341st Maintenance Group from December 2015 to June 2017, with a deployment as superintendent of the 1st Expeditionary Rescue Group in Diyarbakir, Turkey, and Erbil, Iraq, from March to October 2016.

In June 2017, Flosi assumed the role of Command Chief Master Sergeant, a position he held in various capacities until February 2020. He served with NATO's Train Advise Assist Command-Air and the 438th Air Expeditionary Wing at Forward Operating Base Oqab in Afghanistan from April 2019 to February 2020.

From March 2020 to September 2021, he served as Command Chief Master Sergeant at the Air Force Sustainment Center, Tinker AFB, Oklahoma. He then moved to Wright-Patterson AFB, Ohio to serve as Command Chief Master Sergeant for Air Force Materiel Command from October 2021 to February 2024.

In March 2024, Flosi was appointed Chief Master Sergeant of the Air Force, based at The Pentagon, Virginia. Flosi announced his retirement on 13 October 2025, following the death of his wife.

== Major awards and decorations ==
- Legion of Merit with two oak leaf clusters
- Bronze Star Medal
- Meritorious Service Medal with one silver and one bronze oak leaf cluster
- Air and Space Commendation Medal
- Air and Space Achievement Medal with three oak leaf clusters

== Other achievements ==
In 2000, Flosi received the John L. Levitow Award at the Airman Leadership School. He was awarded the same honor in 2007 at the USAFE Noncommissioned Officer Academy. In 2010, he was inducted into the Sigma Iota Epsilon Professional Management Fraternity.

In 2011, he was recognized as a Distinguished Graduate of the Senior Noncommissioned Officer Academy. Under his leadership, the 705th Munitions Squadron received the Air Force Global Strike Command's Maintenance Effectiveness Award in 2014. Similarly, in 2016, the 341st Maintenance Group was recognized with the Secretary of Defense Outstanding Field Level Maintenance Award.

Military offices
Preceded by JoAnne S. Bass	Chief Master Sergeant of the Air Force; 2024–2025	Succeeded by David R. Wolfe
