= Flosi =

Flosi is a surname. Notable people with the surname include:

- Flosi Ólafsson (1929–2009), Icelandic actor
- Flosi Sigurðsson (born 1960), Icelandic former basketball player

== See also ==
- David A. Flosi, United States Air Force officer
