= Airman Leadership School =

U.S. Air Force education program

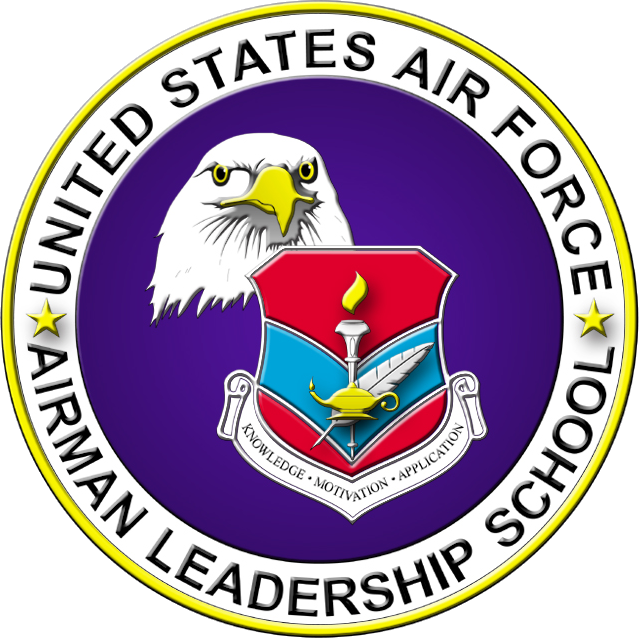

Airman Leadership School (ALS) is a 24 duty day (5 week) United States Air Force program designed to develop airmen into effective front-line supervisors. It is the first professional military education that enlisted Air Force members encounter. ALS focuses on developing leadership abilities, the profession of arms, and building effective communication. ALS was established in the 1990s, replacing the Non-commissioned Officer (NCO) Preparatory Course and NCO Leadership School.

The Distance Learning version of ALS is conducted by the Air Force Global College (AFGC) - College of Online Professional Military Education (COOL PME), a separate school within Air University. It has different curriculum and admission eligibility than the in-residence version.

== Eligibility ==
Senior airmen with 36 months time in service or those with a promotion line number for staff sergeant are eligible to attend the school. The member must also have at least six months of retainability from the projected class graduation date before being enrolled.

== Awards in ALS ==
- Noncommissioned Officer Development Ribbon - Mandatory award and wear upon successful completion of ALS.
- John Levitow Award - The highest award presented at Airman Leadership School, the Levitow award is presented to the student that demonstrates the most outstanding leadership and scholastic qualities. Selection for the Levitow award is based on academic performance and assignment of points by peers and instructors (although it is unclear what weight each category carries in determining the winner).
- Commandant Leadership Award - Presented to the student who has displayed all the characteristics of an effective leader, but is not solely based on academic standings. Depending on class size, one or two students from each flight in the class are selected by their peers and must meet with the Commandant. The commandant is the final determining factor in who is awarded the honor.
- Academic Achievement Award - Presented to the student with highest overall average on all academic evaluations.
- Distinguished Graduate Award - Presented to the next (10% of graduates) person with the highest overall average in all graded areas, and demonstrated a high level of leadership skills.

== Supervision without promotion ==
Upon completion of ALS, the graduate is authorized to write performance reports on subordinates. This allows the senior airman graduate the ability to supervise without promotion to staff sergeant.

== Curriculum ==
Airman Leadership School provides training in combat leadership, military professionalism, supervision, verbal and written communication, and group dynamics. Other topics include diversity, airmanship, emergent leadership issues, and modern communication.

A majority of the instruction focuses around various Air Force rules and regulations.

== See also ==
- Non-commissioned officer
- Basic Leader Course
