= John Levitow =

US Air Force Medal of Honor recipient

Sgt. John L. Levitow
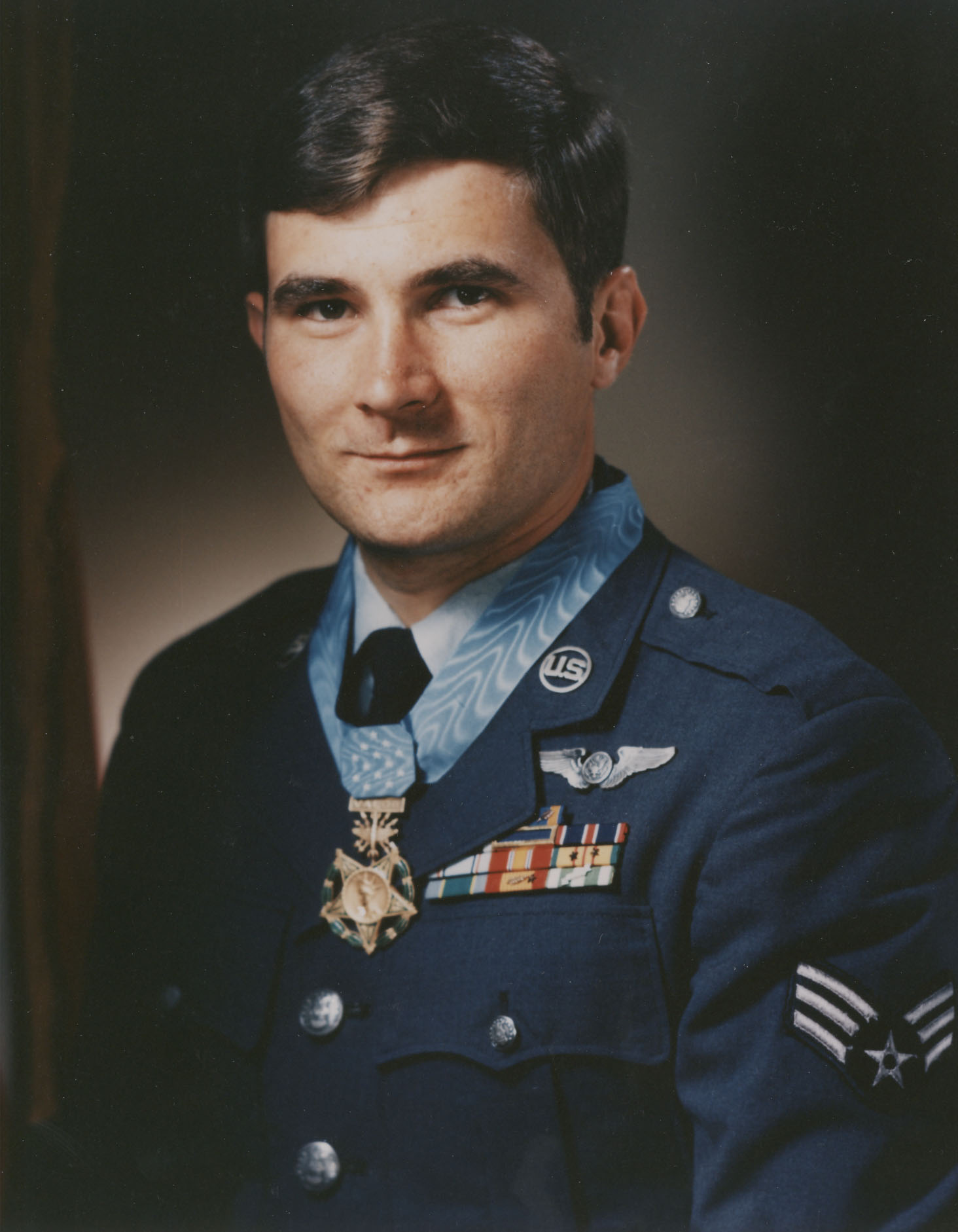
- John Levitow
- Born: November 1, 1945; Hartford, Connecticut, US
- Died: November 8, 2000 (aged 55); Connecticut, US
- Burial place: Arlington National Cemetery
- Military career
- Allegiance: United States
- Branch: United States Air Force
- Service years: 1966–1970
- Rank: Sgt
- Unit: 3rd Special Operations Squadron
- Conflicts: Vietnam War
- Awards: Medal of Honor; Purple Heart; Air Medal (8)

John Lee Levitow (November 1, 1945 – November 8, 2000) was a United States Air Force (USAF) loadmaster who received the Medal of Honor for exceptional heroism during wartime. He was awarded the Medal of Honor for his acts of heroism while serving on board a Douglas AC-47 Spooky gunship of the 3d Special Operations Squadron USAF on February 24, 1969. An airman first class at the time of his actions, he became the first enlisted serviceman in the Air Force to receive the Medal of Honor, the United States military's highest honor. (Note: The US Air Force was created in 1948, so the four US Army Air Forces enlisted personnel awarded a Medal of Honor (MOH) during WWII were not from the US Air Force. All four US Air Force MOH recipients in the Korean War were officers. The first nine US Air Force MOH recipients in the Vietnam War were officers. Levitow's was the 14th MOH ever awarded to someone from the Air Force and the first to an enlisted serviceman. Overall, the MOH has rarely been awarded to Air Force personnel of any rank; as of June 2022, only 19 have been awarded, to 14 officers and five enlisted personnel. See also: List of post-Vietnam War Medal of Honor recipients)

== Biography ==
Born in Hartford, Connecticut to a Jewish family, he originally intended to join the United States Navy, but changed his mind and joined the USAF in June 1966. His first job was civil engineering, then he cross-trained into the loadmaster career field.

On February 24, 1969, Levitow was asked to fill in for the regular loadmaster on an armed AC-47, call sign Spooky 71. It was Airman Levitow's job to set the ejection and ignition timer controls on Mark 24 magnesium flares and pass them to the gunner for deployment. These flares were 27-pound (12 kg) metal canisters 3 feet (0.91 m) long that would burn at 4,000 °F, illuminate with the intensity of two million candlepower and burn for two and a half to three minutes. Spooky 71 was flying night missions near the Tan Son Nhut Air base area when Long Binh came under attack.

As the crew of Spooky 71 manned their aircraft patrolling the area, the pilot, Major Kenneth Carpenter, had seen muzzle flashes outside Long Binh Army Base. The pilot threw the AC-47 and its eight-man crew into a banked turn to engage the Viet Cong in the Tan Son Nhut Air Base area.

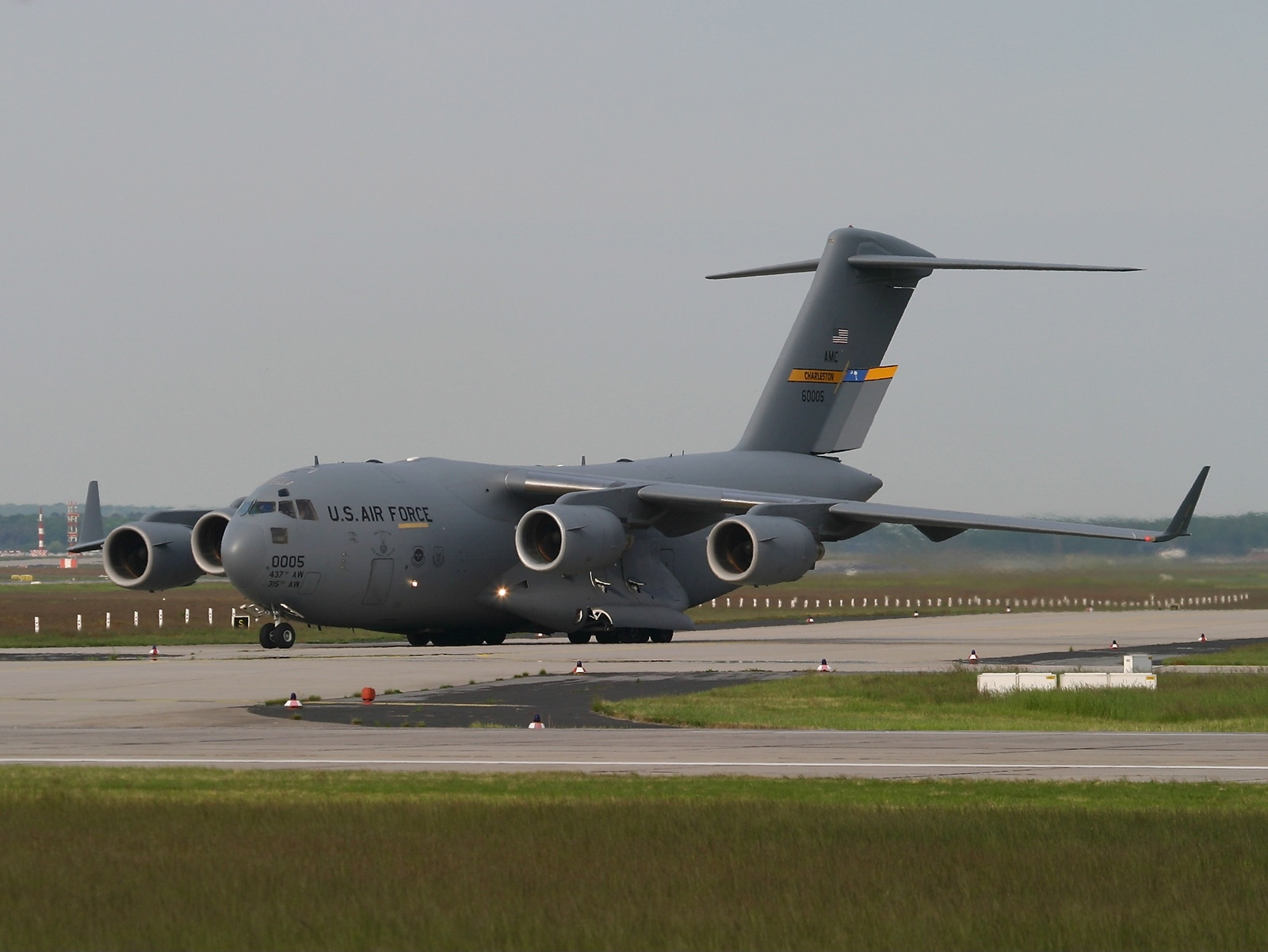
This C-17 Globemaster III was named after him on January 23, 1998, "The Spirit of John L. Levitow".

On the pilot's command, Levitow and the gunner began deploying flares through the open cargo door. Levitow set the timers and handed a flare to the gunner, who held it with his finger through the pull ring attached to the safety pin. Suddenly, Spooky 71 was jarred by a tremendous explosion. A North Vietnamese Army's 82 mm mortar shell hit the right wing and exploded inside the structure, raking the fuselage with flying shrapnel. Everyone in the back of Spooky 71 was wounded, including Levitow, who was hit by shrapnel and experienced a concussion that he was quoted as saying, "felt like being hit by a two-by-four." The blast also jarred the flare from the gunner's hands, pulling the safety pin from the canister as it did so and arming the fuse.

Despite more than 40 wounds in his back and legs, Levitow saw the loose flare, its fuse burning with clouds of smoke, rolling amid ammunition cans that contained 19,000 rounds of live ammunition. When the flare exploded, it could detonate the ammunition and burn a hole through the floor to the aircraft's control cables below. Through a haze of pain and shock, unable to stand up, and fighting the aircraft's 30° bank angle, Levitow crawled to the flare and threw himself upon it. Hugging it to his body, he dragged himself back to the rear of the cabin and pushed it through the open cargo door an instant before it ignited, saving the aircraft and its crew. When the aircraft finally returned to the base, the extent of the damage became apparent. The AC-47 had more than 3,500 holes in the wings and fuselage, one measuring more than 3 ft long.

Levitow received the Medal of Honor from President Richard Nixon on, May 14, 1970, on Armed Forces Day.

Levitow died of cancer on November 8, 2000. He is buried at Arlington National Cemetery in Virginia. His grave can be found in section 66, site 7107.

The John Levitow Award is the highest honor presented to a graduate of Air Force Enlisted Professional Military Education, including Airman Leadership School, NCO Academy, and the Senior NCO Academy. To be eligible for the award, a graduate must rank in the top 1% of his or her class.

== Military decorations ==

Enlisted Aircrew Badge
Medal of Honor	Purple Heart	Air Medal with one silver and two bronze oak leaf clusters
Air Force Presidential Unit Citation	Air Force Outstanding Unit Award	Air Force Good Conduct Medal
National Defense Service Medal	Vietnam Service Medal with bronze campaign star	Air Force Longevity Service Award
Small Arms Expert Marksmanship Ribbon	Vietnam Gallantry Cross Unit Citation	Vietnam Campaign Medal

=== Medal of Honor citation ===
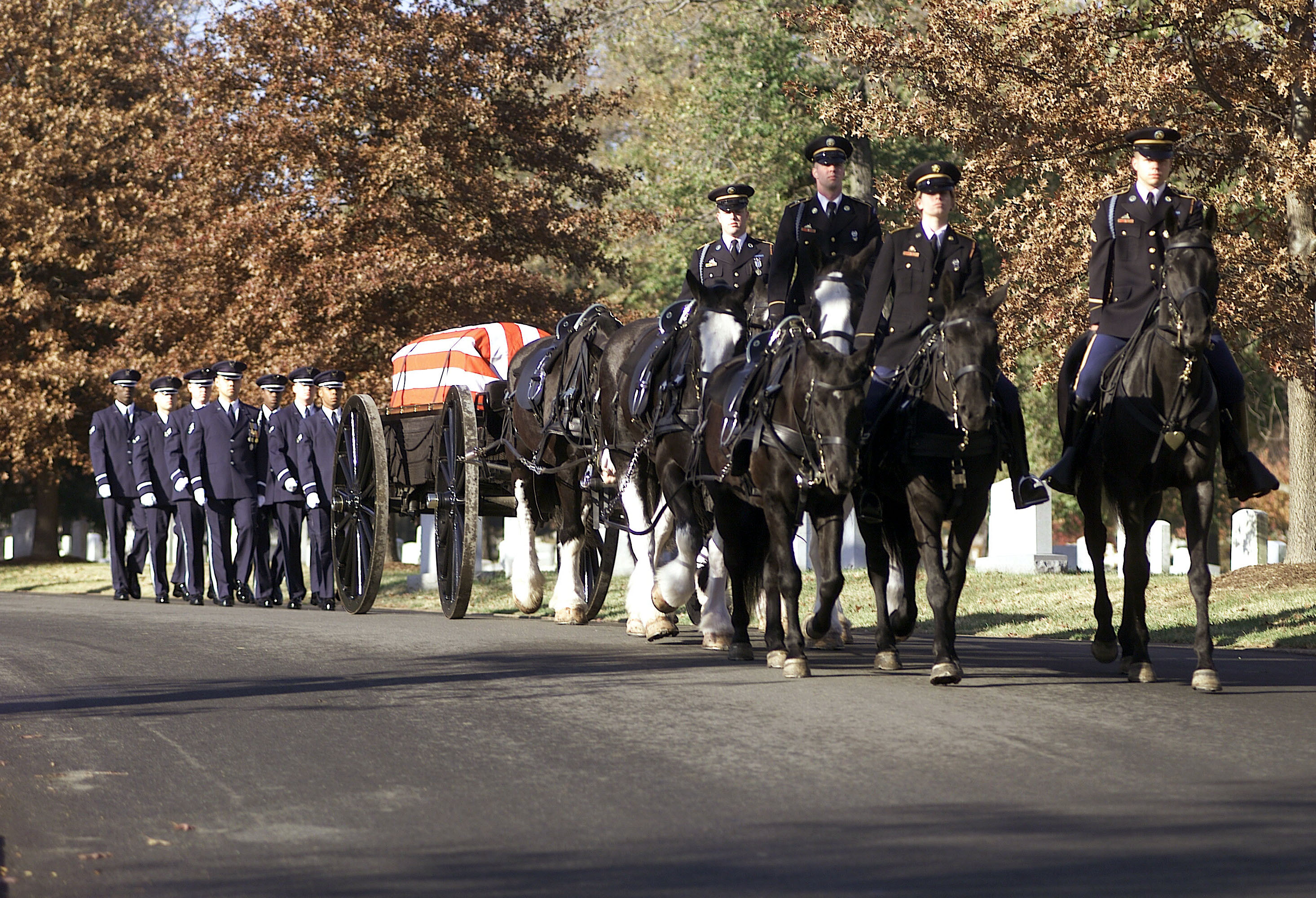
His burial at Arlington National Cemetery on November 17, 2000.

Rank and organization: Sergeant, U.S. Air Force, 3d Special Operations Squadron. place and date: Long Binh Army post, Republic of Vietnam, 24 February 1969. Entered service at: New Haven, Conn. Born: 1 November 1945, Hartford, Conn.

Citation:

For conspicuous gallantry and intrepidity in action at the risk of his life above and beyond the call of duty. Sgt. Levitow (then A1C), U.S. Air Force, distinguished himself by exceptional heroism while assigned as a loadmaster aboard an AC-47 aircraft flying a night mission in support of Long Binh Army post. Sgt. Levitow's aircraft was struck by a hostile mortar round. The resulting explosion ripped a hole 2 feet in diameter through the wing and fragments made over 3,500 holes in the fuselage. All occupants of the cargo compartment were wounded and helplessly slammed against the floor and fuselage. The explosion tore an activated flare from the grasp of a crewmember who had been launching flares to provide illumination for Army ground troops engaged in combat. Sgt. Levitow, though stunned by the concussion of the blast and suffering from over 40 fragment wounds in the back and legs, staggered to his feet and turned to assist the man nearest to him who had been knocked down and was bleeding heavily. As he was moving his wounded comrade forward and away from the opened cargo compartment door, he saw the smoking flare ahead of him in the aisle. Realizing the danger involved and completely disregarding his own wounds, Sgt. Levitow started toward the burning flare. The aircraft was partially out of control and the flare was rolling wildly from side to side. Sgt. Levitow struggled forward despite the loss of blood from his many wounds and the partial loss of feeling in his right leg. Unable to grasp the rolling flare with his hands, he threw himself bodily upon the burning flare. Hugging the deadly device to his body, he dragged himself back to the rear of the aircraft and hurled the flare through the open cargo door. At that instant the flare separated and ignited in the air, but clear of the aircraft. Sgt. Levitow, by his selfless and heroic actions, saved the aircraft and its entire crew from certain death and destruction. Sgt. Levitow's gallantry, his profound concern for his fellowmen, at the risk of his life above and beyond the call of duty are in keeping with the highest traditions of the U.S. Air Force and reflect great credit upon himself and the Armed Forces of his country.

=== Other awards ===
In 1998, he was inducted into the Airlift/Tanker Association Hall of Fame.

In April 2025, the United States Air Force Academy Class of 2028 selected Levitow to be the class's exemplar.

The training support center on Keesler Air Force Base is named after Levitow.

== C-17 Globemaster III ==
On January 31, 1998, Boeing delivered C-17 Globemaster III S/N 96-0005, named The Spirit of John L. Levitow to the 437th Airlift Wing (AMC) and the 315th Airlift Wing (AFRC), Charleston AFB, South Carolina. Later transferred to the 105th Airlift Wing, New York Air National Guard.

== See also ==
- List of Medal of Honor recipients
- List of Medal of Honor recipients for the Vietnam War
- Henry E. Erwin – awarded the Medal of Honor for similar actions
