= Community College of the Air Force =

American federal education program

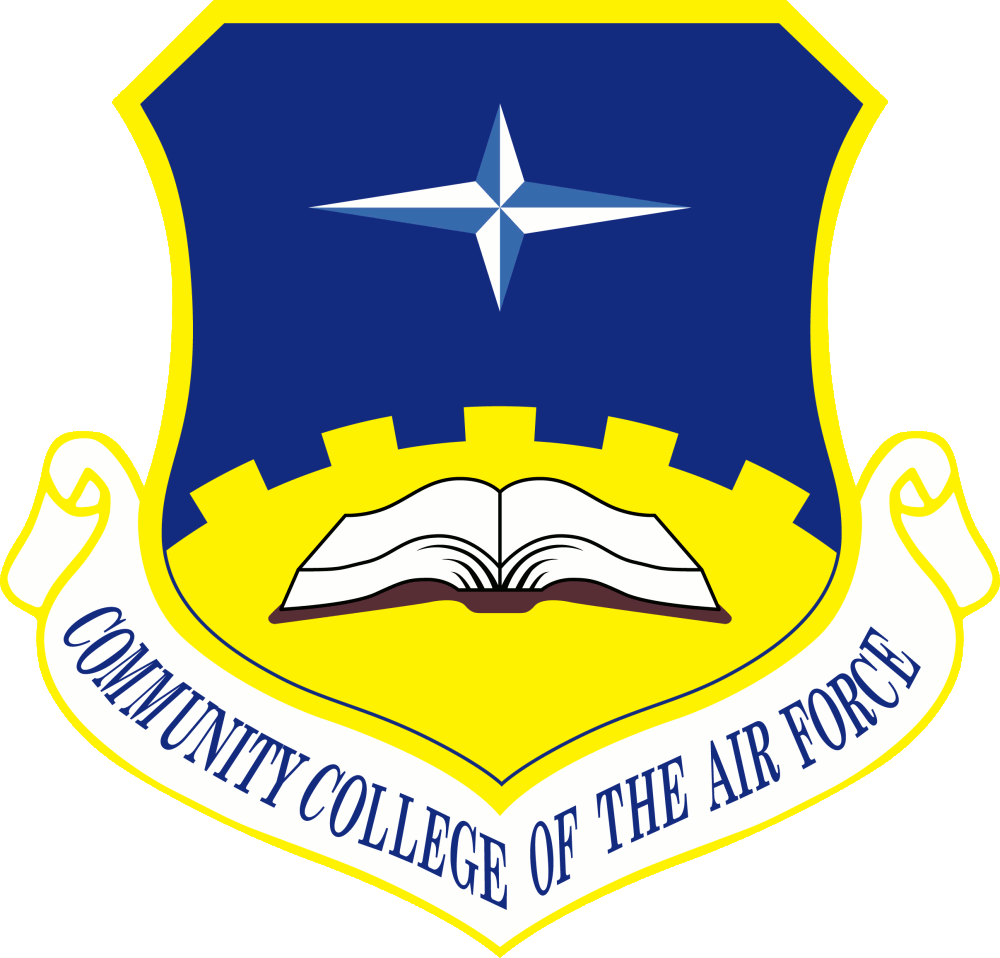
- Motto: The foundation of liberty is knowledge.
- Type: Public two-year
- Established: 1972
- Affiliations: Air University
- Students: 351,715
- Location: Maxwell AFB, AL, United States
- Campus: Multi-campus
- Website: Official website

The Community College of the Air Force (CCAF) is a federal program offered by the United States Air Force and United States Space Force which grants two-year Associate of Applied Science (AAS) degrees in association with Air University. CCAF serves approximately 300,000 active, guard, and reserve enlisted personnel, making CCAF the world's largest community college system. The college awards over 22,000 associate in applied science degrees from 71 degree programs annually.

The CCAF is accredited by the Southern Association of Colleges and Schools through Air University.

== History ==
In the early 1970s, the Air Force decided to attempt to gain accreditation and recognition for Air Force training programs. Representatives of the Air Training Command (ATC), Air University, and the United States Air Force Academy held numerous conferences in 1971 to discuss increased training for Air Force non-commissioned officers (NCOs). These conferences, in turn, recommended the foundation of an Air Force community college. On 9 November 1971, Gen John D. Ryan, Air Force Chief of Staff, approved the establishment of the Community College of the Air Force. The Secretary of the Air Force approved the plan 25 January 1972, and the college was officially established on 1 April 1972, at Randolph AFB, TX.

Until the mid-1970s, the CCAF offered only certificate programs. It became apparent that CCAF standards exceeded the minimum requirements of associate degree programs in civilian community colleges. Therefore, in 1975 the Air Force sought degree-granting authority for the college from Congress. President Gerald R. Ford signed Public Law 94-361 on 14 July 1976 authorizing the AETC commander to confer the associate degree.

Following an evaluation in October 1976, the U.S. Commissioner of Education certified degree-granting authority in January 1977. The college awarded its first AAS degree in April 1977.

When the Commission on Occupational Education Institution charter was limited in 1975 to non-degree-granting institutions, the CCAF began seeking accreditation from the SACS Commission on Colleges. The Commission on Colleges accredited the CCAF on 12 December 1980. In 2004, Air University became accredited by the SACS Commission on Colleges to award associate and master's degrees. CCAF now shares in Air University's regional accreditation. CCAF was separately accredited by SACS from 1980 to 2004.

Currently the CCAF is only open to enlisted airmen in the active duty Regular Air Force, the Air Force Reserve, and the Air National Guard, plus enlisted guardians in the corresponding Space Force components.

== Academics ==
The CCAF offers Associates of Applied Science degrees in five broad career areas:

- Aircraft and Missile Maintenance
- Allied Health
- Electronics and Telecommunications
- Logistics and Resources
- Public and Support Services

Within those 5 broad areas, the CCAF currently offers 67 specific degree programs.
