= Dobodura Airfield Complex (1942) =

New Guinean airfield

- Dobodura in Papua New Guinea

Site information
- Type: Airfield complex
- Condition: Abandoned

Location
- Shown within Papua New Guinea
- Coordinates: 8°47′03″S 148°20′29″E

Site history
- Built: December 1942 - Early 1943
- In use: 1943 - 1945
- Fate: Disused

Dobodura Airfield Complex was an airfield complex, which consisted of 15 landing grounds. It was located in Dobodura, inland from the Northern coast of New Guinea.

== History ==
The Allies acknowledged the need for an airfield on the northern coast of New Guinea, while also being on the vicinity of Buna for use if Lae Airfield and Salamaua Airfield were attacked by Japanese forces. On July 9, 1942, an Allied reconnaissance was scheduled of the area, and two days later on July 11, a Royal Australian Air Force Catalina flew over Dobodura. Aboard were six officers including one US Army engineering officer, and three Australian officers, which determined that the plain and flat terrain at Dobodura should be developed. Afterwards, the Dobodura Airfield Complex was built by the United States Army Air Forces between December 1942 and early 1943. A total of 15 landing grounds were built and put to use, which held several bomber and fighter squadrons, however, it was unclear which specific airfield each unit was based. Dobodura was also used to receive war supplies, including heavy field guns to support the Allied campaign on New Guinea Island.

== Airfields ==
=== Raways Airfield (Dobodura No. 1) ===
Raways Airfield was completed by late 1943 by the US Army for the usage of liaison planes and light aircraft.

=== Horanda 4 (Dobodura No. 4) ===
The Horanda No. 4 Strip had two runways. In January 1944, there was a camp consisting of a mess hall and tents located two miles from the strip, which the 22nd Bomb Group was stationed in before. After they left, the 501st unit had moved in, reoccupying facilities and using the No. 4 strip which was within walking distance.

=== Kenney Airfield (Dobodura No. 7) ===
Between late 1942 and early 1943, Kenney Airfield was constructed, named in honor of in honor of Fifth Air Force Commander General George Kenney. It was also known as No. 7, West 7, or Horanda No. 7 Airstrip or West 7, however it was more commonly known as Kenney Airfield. It was the only airfield that was not abandoned after the war, and is known as Girua Airport today.

Major USAAF units assigned

- 3d Bombardment Group (May 20, 1943 – February 3, 1944)

Headquarters, 13th, 89th, 90th Bomb Squadrons, North American B-25 Mitchell

- 22d Bombardment Group (October 9, 1943 – January 13, 1944)

Headquarters, 2d, 19th, 408th Bomb Squadrons, Martin B-26 Marauder

- 43d Bombardment Group (December 10, 1943 – March 4, 1944)

Headquarters, 63d, 64th, 65th, 403d Bomb Squadrons, Consolidated B-24 Liberator

- 90th Bombardment Group (December 1943 – February 23, 1944)

Headquarters, 319th, 320th, 321st, 400th Bomb Squadrons, B-24 Liberator

- 345th Bombardment Group (January 18 – February 16, 1944)

Headquarters, 498th, 499th, 500th, 501st Bomb Squadrons, B-25 Mitchell

- 417th Bombardment Group (February 7 – April 8, 1944), (Headquarters)

672d, 673d, 673d, 675th Bomb Squadrons, Douglas A-20 Havoc

- 49th Fighter Group (March – November 20, 1943)

Headquarters, 7th, 8th Fighter Squadrons, Curtiss P-40, 9th Fighter Squadron, Lockheed P-38 Lightning and Republic P-47 Thunderbolt

- 58th Fighter Group (December 28, 1943 – April 3, 1944)

Headquarters, 69th, 310th, 311th Fighter Squadrons, P-47 Thunderbolt

- 475th Fighter Group (August 14, 1943 – March 24, 1944) (Headquarters)

432d Fighter Squadron, P-38 Lightning, (May 15 – July 12, 1944), (North Borio Airfield, Dobodura No. 15)
433rd Fighter Squadron, P-38 Lightning, (August 14 – October 3, 1943), (Borio Airfield, Dobodura No. 11)

- 418th Night Fighter Squadron (V Fighter Command) (November 22, 1943 – March 28, 1944), Northrop P-61 Black Widow
- 80th Fighter Squadron, (8th Fighter Group), (December 11, 1943 – February 28, 1944), P-38 Lightning
- 375th Troop Carrier Group, (August 19 – December 19, 1943) (HQ Echelon)

=== Borio Airfield No. 11 (Dobodura No. 11) ===
In July 1943, the construction of Borio Airfield No. 11 was proposed. Between late 1943 and early 1944, the airfield was built by the US Army with taxiways connecting to North Borio Airfield and North Embi Airfield. It was used as a USAAF fighter base, and had a compound with US Army nurses and personnel stationed. After the Pacific War, it was abandoned, however it was listed as Embi Landing Ground in the 1970s.

Units:

- 475th Fighter Group, 433rd Fighter Squadron, equipped with P-38s, arrives from Amberley on August 14, 1943

== Allied Units ==
The following lists the Allied units based at Dobodura Airfield Complex:

American units

- 22nd Bombardment Group 19th BS (B-26, B-25) Woodstock arrives July 11, 1943–?
- 22nd BG, 2nd BS (B-26, B-25) Ried River arrives October 9, 1943 – December 19, 1943 departs Nadzab
- 22nd BG HQ, 33rd BS (B-25) Australia arrives October 15, 1943
- 22nd BG 408th BS (B-25) Australia arrives October 15, 1943–?
- 43rd BG, 63rd BS (B-24) Port Moresby arrives October 29, 1943 –?
- 17th TRG, 17th TRS (B-25, P-39) Milne Bay arrives November 22, 1943–?
- 17th TRG, 82nd TRS (B-25, P-39) Milne Bay arrives November 22, 1943–?
- 5th FC, 418th NFS (P-38, P-70) Milne Bay arrives November 22, 1943–?
- 90th BG, 319th, 320th BS (B-24) Port Moresby arrives December 1, 1943–?
- 90th BG, 321st, 400th BS (B-24) Port Moresby arrives December 1, 1943–?
- 43rd BG HQ, 64th BS (B-24) Port Moresby arrives December 10, 1943–?
- 43rd BG HQ, 65th BS (B-24) Port Moresby arrives December 11, 1943–?
- 8th FG, 80th FS (P-38) from Port Moresby arrives December 11, 1943–?
- 43rd BG HQ, 403rd BS (B-24) Port Moresby arrives December 13, 1943 –?
- 375th TCG HQ Port Moresby arrives August 19, 1943 – December 19, 1943 departs Port Moresby
- 345th BG, 501st BS Port Moresby arrives Dec 23, 1943–?
- 58th FG HQ, 310th FS, 311th FS (P-47) Brisbane arrives Dec 28, 1943–?
- 58th FG HQ, 69th FS (P-47) Brisbane arrives Dec 28, 1943–?
- 345th BG, 500st BS (B-25) Port Moresby arrives Jan 1, 1944–?
- 417th Bombardment Group, 673rd BS (A-20) USA / Cape Sudest arrives February 3 - April 14, 1944 departs Saidor
- 417th BG, 672nd BS (A-20) USA / Cape Sudest arrives February 4 - April 10, 1944 departs Saidor
- 417th BG, 674th BS (A-20) USA / Cape Sudest arrives February 4, April 17, 1944, departs Saidor
- 417th BG, 675th Bombardment Squadron (A-20) USA / Cape Sudest arrives February 4 - April 10, 1944 departs Saidor
- 417th BG, HQ USA / Cape Sudest arrives February 7 - April 8, 1944 departs Saidor

Australian units

- No. 6 Squadron (Beaufort) Vivigani arrives 1944–1945 departs Kingaroy

== Post-war ==
After World War II, all airfields except for Kenney Airfield had been abandoned. There were over a thousand aircraft left behind in the Dobodura region. Most were turned into scrap metal by the late 1940s and early 1950s. By the 1990s, most of the airfield's area had been converted into oil palm farms, which remains today. The Oil Parm Industries Corporation is lending money to individual developers to plant oil parm in the area. No plants grow on the runways, as the high compacted earth and bitumen is still present.

== See also ==
- Buna Airfield
