= 675th Bombardment Squadron =

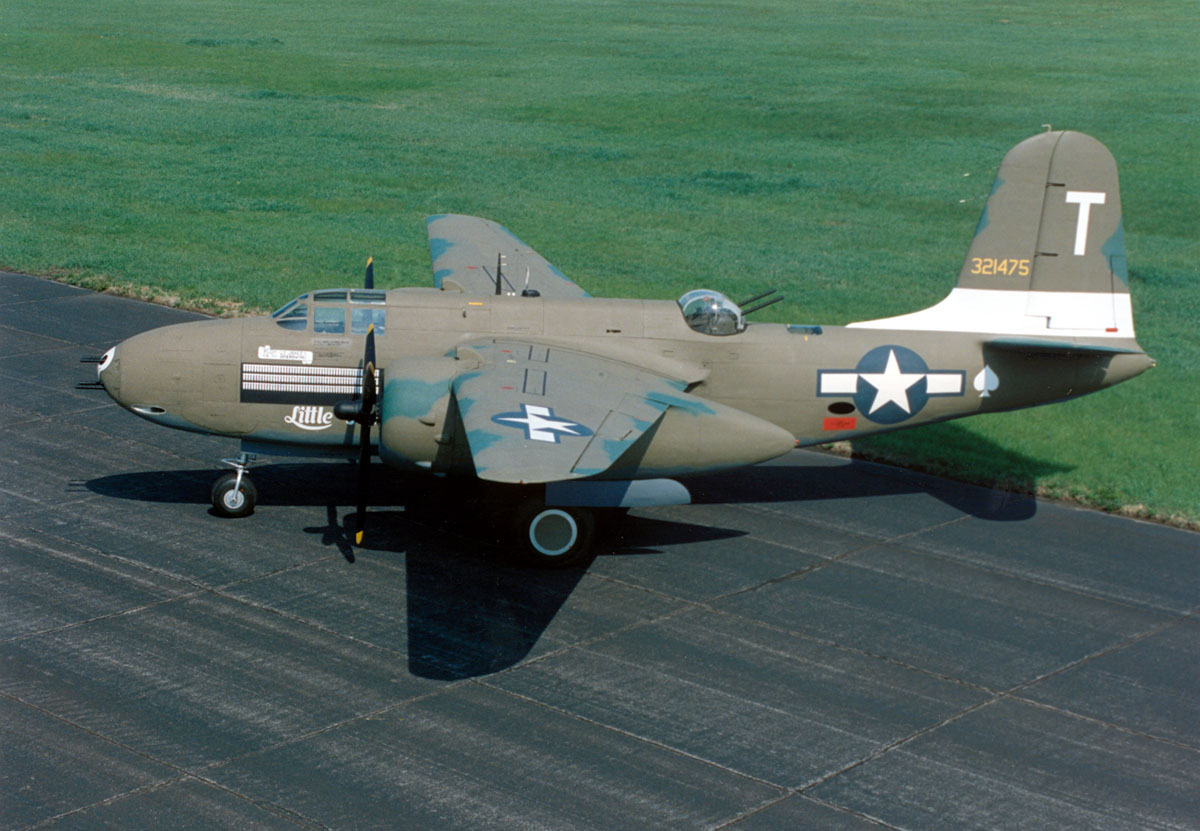
- National Museum of the USAF Douglas A-20 in Southwest Pacific markings
- Active: 1943–1945
- Country: United States
- Branch: United States Air Force
- Role: Light bomber
- Nickname(s): Dauntless Demons
- Engagements: South West Pacific Theater of World War II
- Decorations: Distinguished Unit Citation; Philippine Republic Presidential Unit Citation

Insignia
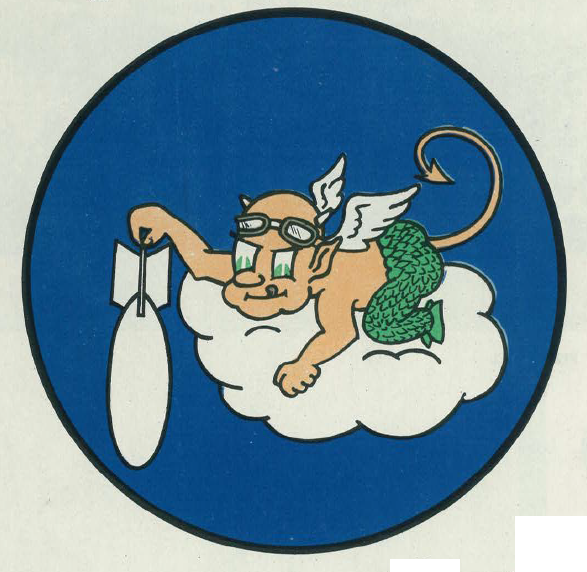
- 675th Bombardment Squadron Emblem (Note: Approved 3 July 1943. Description: On a medium blue disc, border black, a devilish cherub, face arms, body, and barbed tail flesh colored, wings white, tongue and finger nails red, eyes and horns green, wearing leaf trousers yellow-green and aviator's goggles brown, leaning over edge of white cloud formation and dropping a gray aerial bomb, point to base with right hand.)

The 675th Bombardment Squadron is a former United States Army Air Forces unit. Its last assignment was with the 417th Bombardment Group at Itami Airfield, Japan, where it was inactivated on 5 November 1945.

During World War II, the squadron operated in the Southwest Pacific Theater as a light bombardment unit during the New Guinea and Philippines campaigns. It was awarded both the Distinguished Unit Citation and the Philippine Presidential Unit Citation for its combat service.

== History ==
=== Training in the United States ===
The 675th Bombardment Squadron was activated in the spring of 1943 at Will Rogers Field, Oklahoma as one of the original squadrons of the 417th Bombardment Group. The squadron drew its initial cadre from the 46th and 416th Bombardment Groups. Once assigned, the 675th's key personnel travelled to Orlando Army Air Base in mid-April where they received combat training from the Army Air Forces School of Applied Tactics.

The first Douglas A-20 Havocs arrived to equip the squadron in mid-May along with some DB-7 export models of the Havoc. Initial training of the 675th was conducted by the 46th Bombardment Group, the Operational Training Unit at Will Rogers Field. The unit then moved to DeRidder Army Air Base, Louisiana for advanced training. From August to September the 675th operated with the II Tactical Air Division, giving close air support to ground units on maneuvers. Once training was completed, the squadron departed San Francisco by ship on New Year's Day 1944.

=== Combat in the Southwest Pacific ===
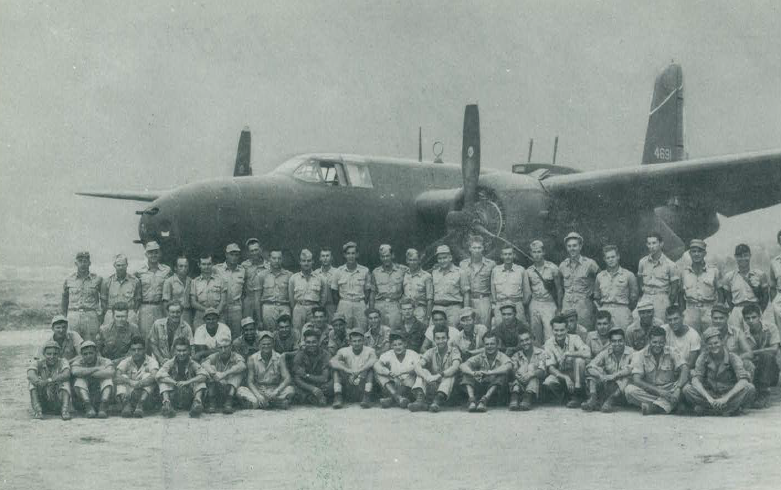
Combat Crews of the 675th Bombardment Squadron in front of one of the squadron's Douglas A-20s in the Southwest Pacific Theater (Note: Aircraft is Douglas A-20H-15-DO Havoc, serial 44-691.)

The squadron arrived in New Guinea in late January 1944, where it became part of Fifth Air Force. It began combat in March, operating in support of ground forces on New Guinea and striking airfields, bridges, personnel concentrations, installations, and shipping in the area. The 675th participated with other Fifth Air Force units in attacks on shipping and enemy airstrips near Hollandia on 16 April that resulted in the destruction of 298 enemy planes.

The unit operated from Noemfoor from September to December 1944, attacking airfields and installations on Ceram, Halmahera, and western New Guinea. Noemfoor operations included attacks on oil installations. The squadron moved to the Philippines in December 1944 at the end of the New Guinea campaign. The unit's ground crews left Noemfoor by ship while the aircrew flew to the Philippines once the advance party had prepared McGuire Field for use in late December. While en route, the convoy transporting the ground echelon endured two Japanese air attacks.

The squadron received a Distinguished Unit Citation for attacking Japanese convoys at Lingayen between 30 December 1944 and 2 January 1945, an action that not only impaired enemy shipping and supply strength, but also helped to clear the way for the American invasion of Luzon. During these attacks the 417th group sank 36,000 tons of shipping including a freighter, a destroyer escort and several transports.

Until June 1945 the 675th supported ground forces and continued to attack enemy airfields, transportation, and installations on Luzon, Cebu, Negros, and Mindanao. The squadron flew its last missions in July, dropping propaganda leaflets to Japanese troops on Luzon. After the Philippines were secured, the group turned its attention to Japanese targets on Formosa in early 1945. It moved to Okinawa in August 1945 and to Itami Air Base, Japan in November, where it was inactivated on 15 November 1945.

== Lineage ==
- Constituted as the 675th Bombardment Squadron (Light) on 23 March 1943

Activated on 28 March 1943
Redesignated 675th Bombardment Squadron, Light in 1944
Inactivated on 15 November 1945

=== Stations ===
- Will Rogers Field, Oklahoma, 28 March 1943
- DeRidder Army Air Base, Louisiana, 5 August 1943 – 10 December 1943
- Cape Sudest Airfield, New Guinea, 28 January 1944
- Dobodura Airfield, New Guinea, 4 February 1944
- Saidor Airfield, New Guinea, 9 April 1944
- Kornasoren Airfield Noemfoor, Schouten Islands, New Guinea, c. 15 September 1944
- Tacloban Airfield, Leyte, Philippines, 6 December 1944
- McGuire Field, Mindoro, Philippines, 22 December 1944
- Motobu Airfield, Okinawa, 15 August 1945
- Itami Airfield, Japan, 1 November 1945 – 15 November 1945

=== Aircraft and missiles ===
- Douglas A-20 Havoc, 1943–1945

=== Awards and campaigns ===
Award streamer	Award	Dates	Notes
	Distinguished Unit Citation	30 December 1944-2 January 1945	Philippine Islands
	Philippine Republic Presidential Unit Citation	17 October 1944-4 July 1945	

Campaign Streamer	Campaign	Dates	Notes
	New Guinea	28 January 1944 – 31 December 1944	
	Leyte	17 October 1944 – 1 July 1945	
	Luzon	15 December 1944 – 4 July 1945	
	Southern Philippines	27 February 1945 – 4 July 1945	

== See also ==
- List of Douglas A-20 Havoc operators
