= 69th Fighter Squadron =

69th Fighter Squadron

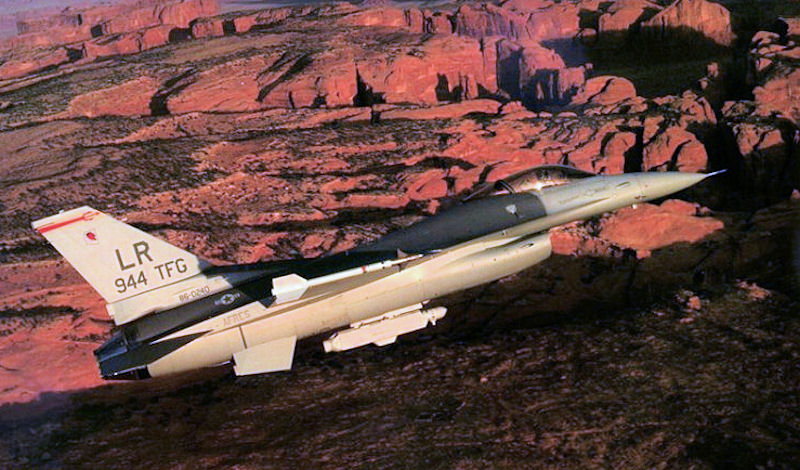
- 944th Fighter Group F-16 Fighting Falcon over Arizona (Note: Aircraft is General Dynamics F-16C Block 32C Fighting Falcon serial 86-240.)
- Active: 1941–1946; 1952–1958; 1969–1983; 1983-2001; 2010–present
- Country: United States
- Branch: United States Air Force
- Role: Fighter Training
- Part of: Air Force Reserve Command
- Nickname(s): Dragons (1983–1990) Werewolves (1990–present)
- Engagements: World War II American Theater; World War II Asia-Pacific Theater; Korean War; 1991 Gulf War (Defense of Saudi Arabia; Liberation of Kuwait)

- Decorations: Distinguished Unit Citation (2×); Air Force Outstanding Unit Award with Combat "V" Device; Air Force Outstanding Unit Award (7×); Presidential Unit Citation (Philippines); Republic of Korea Presidential Unit Citation

Insignia
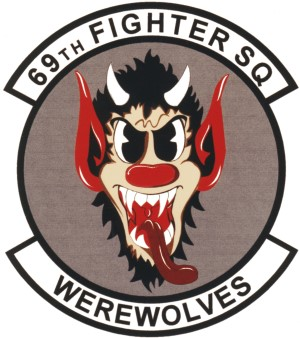
- 69th Fighter Squadron emblem (approved 20 September 1990, modified 16 November 1994) (Note: The 1994 modification was limited to the placement and color of the tabs.)

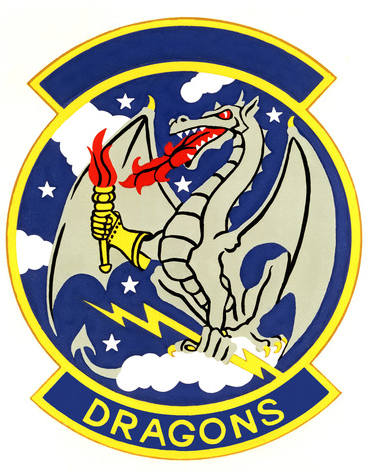
- 69th Tactical Fighter Squadron emblem (approved 17 October 1983)

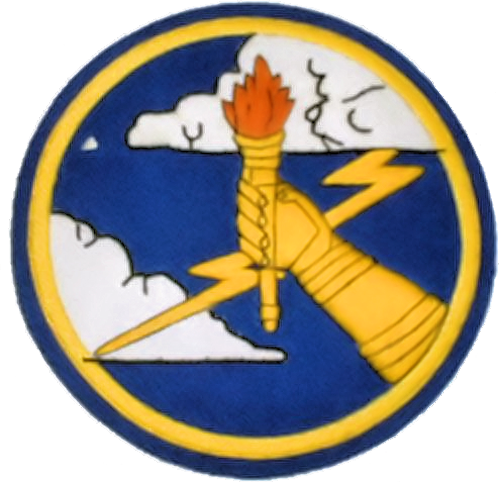
- 69th Fighter Squadron emblem (approved 25 June 1942)

The 69th Fighter Squadron is a United States Air Force Reserve fighter squadron. It is assigned to the 944th Operations Group, stationed at Luke Air Force Base, Arizona.

The 69th Fighter Squadron replaced the 301st Fighter Squadron in 2010. It trains Air Force Reserve Command pilots combat tactics with the F-16 Fighting Falcon. It is integrated with the 56th Operations Group. The squadron flies Block 42 F-16Cs, tail code "LF", 69th FS carrying a black tail band.

== History ==
=== World War II ===
The squadron was activated in 1941 as a single-engine fighter operational and replacement training unit, initially assigned to III Fighter Command. It was reassigned to I Fighter Command in 1942. It used Bell P-39 Airacobras and Curtiss P-40 Warhawks for training. Converted to an operational squadron, 1943, re-equipped with P-47 Thunderbolts.

Deployed to the South West Pacific Area in 1943 and assigned to Thirteenth Air Force. Began combat operations in February 1944, providing protection for U.S. bases and escorting transports initially, then escorting bombers over New Guinea and sea convoys to Admiralty Islands. From Noemfoor, bombed and strafed Japanese airfields and installations on Ceram, Halmahera, and the Kai Islands.

Moved to the Philippines in November, flew fighter sweeps against enemy airfields, supported U.S. ground forces, and protected sea convoys and transport routes. Beginning in July 1945, attacked railways, airfields, and enemy installations in Korea and Kyushu, Japan from Okinawa.

After V-J Day, flew reconnaissance missions over Japan. Moved without personnel or equipment to the Philippines in December and demobilized, aircraft sent to depots in the Philippines, inactivated in January 1946.

=== Korean War ===
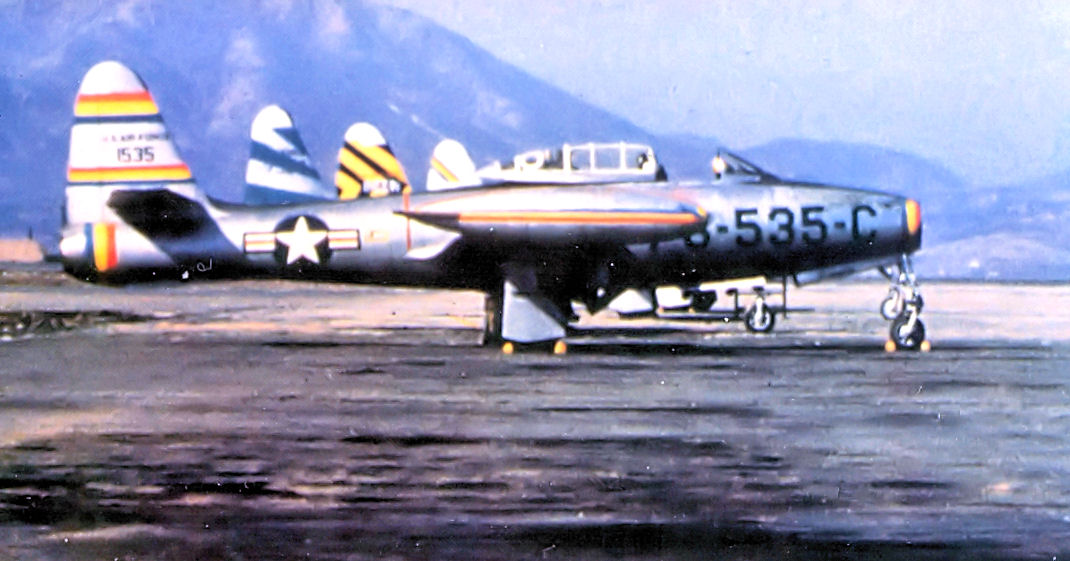
69th Fighter Squadron F-84E Thunderjet 51-535 Taegu Air Base (K-2), South Korea, 1952

Reactivated at Taegu Air Base (K-2) South Korea in 1952, replacing a federalized Texas Air National Guard squadron and assuming its personnel and Republic F-84D Thunderjets. The squadron provided close air support for United Nations ground forces and attacked enemy airfields and installations. Transitioned in late 1952 to the new Republic F-84G, designed with more speed and range. New targets included enemy ports, railroads, and airfields. The squadron attacked the major supply port of Sinuiju in September, inflicting heavy damage without loss of personnel or aircraft. Combining with other fighter-bomber units, it attacked the Kumgang Political School at Odong-ni in October 1952 and the North Korean tank and infantry school at Kangso in February 1953. In May, the 58th Fighter-Bomber Group bombed North Korean dams, flooding enemy lines of communication and rice fields. On 27 July 1953, it attacked the runway at Kanggye and, with the 49th Fighter-Bomber Group, bombed Sunan Airfield for the final action of fighter-bombers in the Korean War.

Re-equipped with North American F-86 Sabres after the 1953 armistice, remained in South Korea to enforce cease-fire with North Korea, squadron elements rotating frequently to Taiwan until inactivated in 1958 due to budget reductions.

=== F-104 Training Unit ===
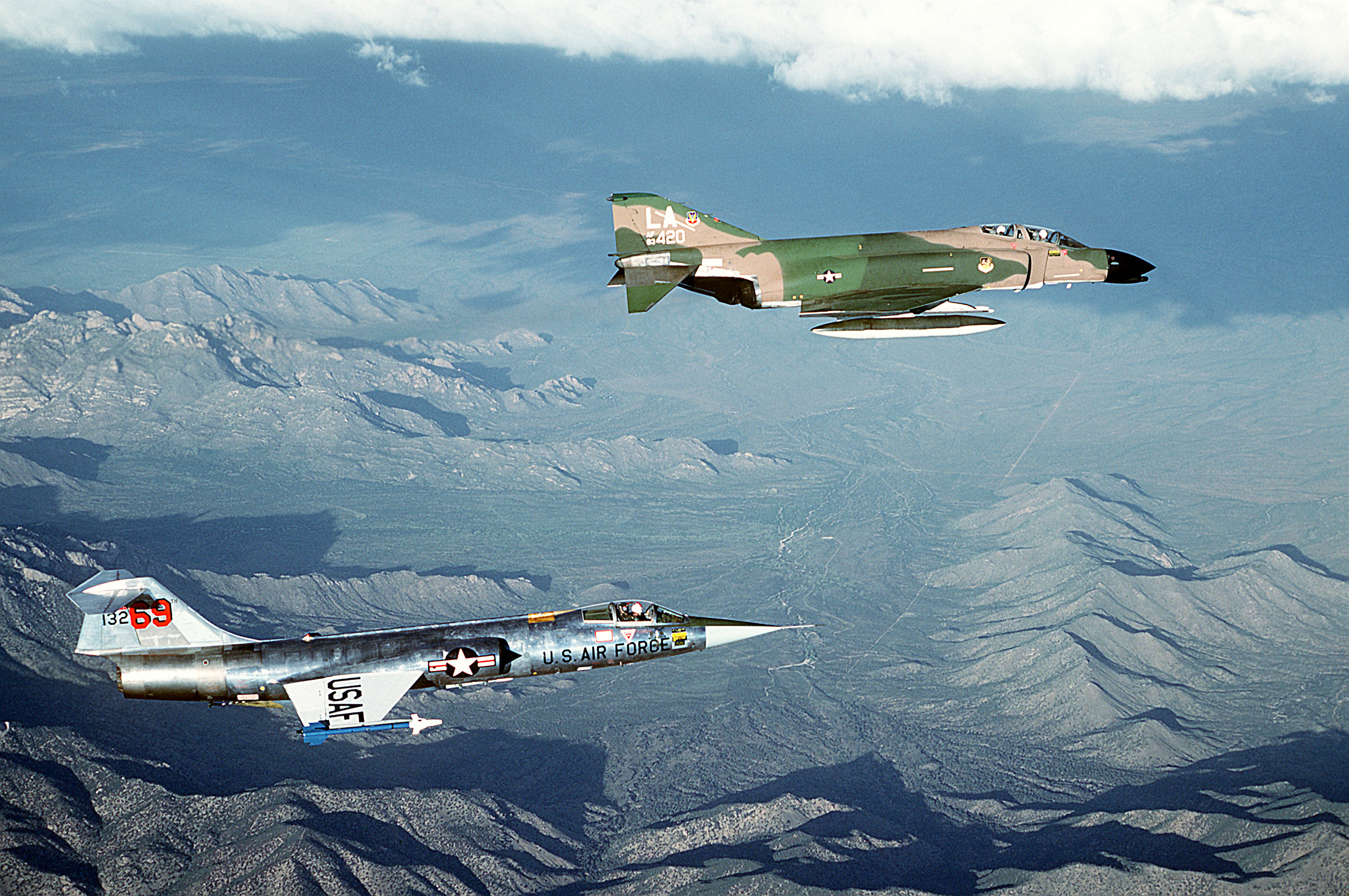
An F-4C-15-MC Phantom II (s/n 63-7420), top, and a German Lockheed F-104G Starfighter (63–13269) aircraft [flown by Retired Lt. Colonel Richard Hays] on a training mission from Luke AFB

The squadron was reactivated at Luke Air Force Base, Arizona in October 1969. This took place when the 58th Tactical Fighter Training Wing was activated, replacing the 4510th Combat Crew Training Wing as the host unit at Luke. Concurrently, the 69th Tactical Fighter Training Squadron and the 418th Tactical Fighter Training Squadron were activated as Lockheed F-104G Starfighter training units, replacing the 4512th and 4518th Combat Crew Training Squadrons to support foreign military sales of the F-104. Pilots from Greece, Norway, Turkey, Denmark, and Spain trained at Luke. In addition, many F-104Gs owned by the West German Luftwaffe operated with the 58th Wing where they sported USAF insignia and carried USAF serial numbers.

Training of West German Air Force pilots in the F-104G continued until late 1982. The Germans flew more than 900 Starfighters totaling an excess of 269,750 hours and produced 1,868 F-104 pilots. The squadron inactivated on 16 March 1983.

=== Tactical Fighter Squadron ===
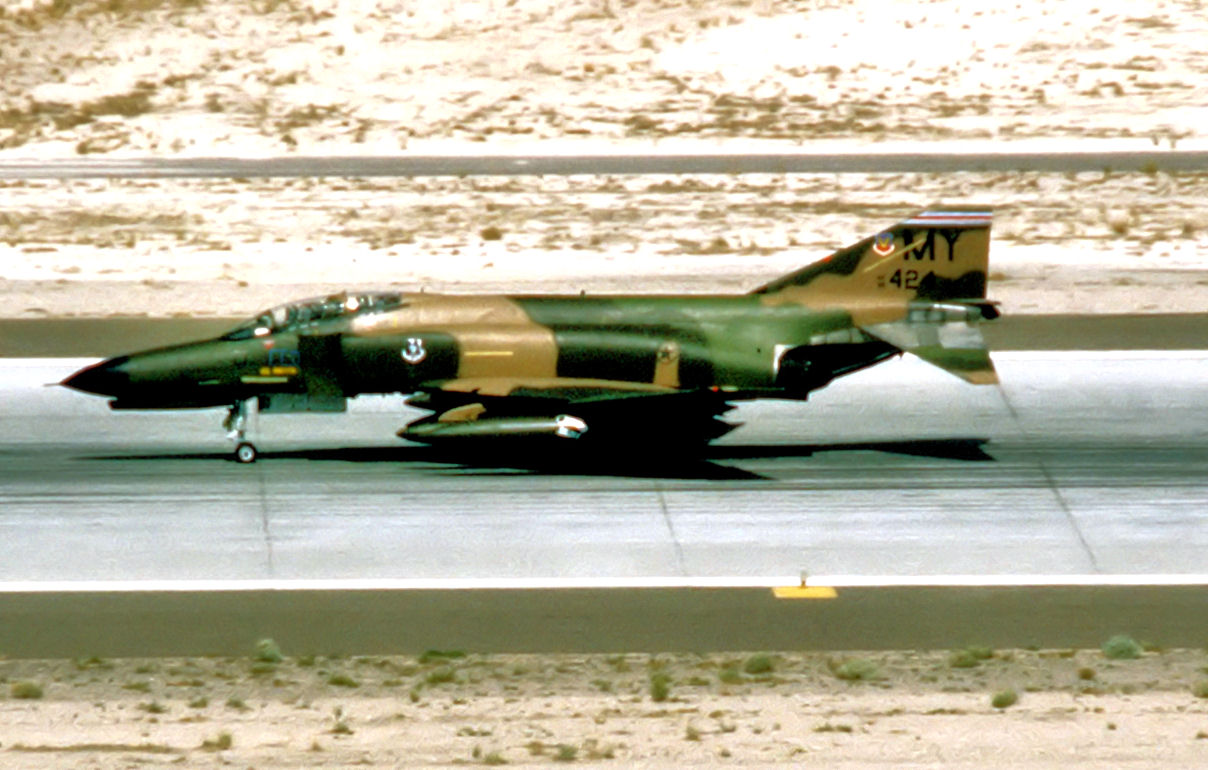
F-4E-39-MC Phantom II (s/n 68-0424) from the 69th Tactical Fighter Squadron, 347th Tactical Fighter Wing, 1981

Reactivated as a McDonnell F-4E Phantom II tactical fighter squadron at Moody Air Force Base, Georgia on 1 July 1983, assuming the personnel and aircraft of the 339th Tactical Fighter Squadron which inactivated the same day. Tail coded "MY", carried a silver/red tail stripe. Conducted frequent exercise deployments in the U.S. and overseas to maintain capabilities specializing in air-to-ground attack using precision-guided weapons. Transitioned to General Dynamics F-16 Fighting Falcon aircraft, 1988–1989, and oriented mission planning toward NATO requirements by conducting squadron-strength deployments to Europe. Began upgrading to F-16C/D in Jan 1990 and in Aug 1990 became first operational Tactical Air Command unit to employ the LANTIRN all-weather/night navigation and bombing system.

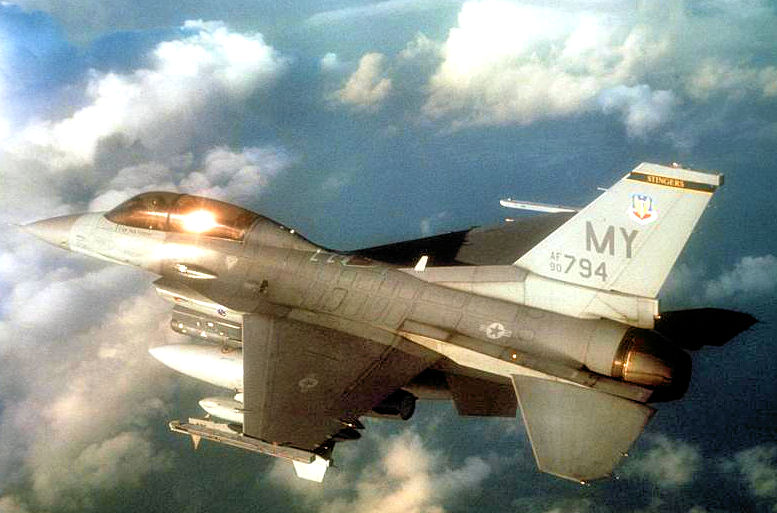
Moody AFB 69th FS F-16D Block 40J Fighting Falcon 90-0794

Deployed to Southwest Asia, January–February 1991, engaging in combat operations during Operation Desert Storm flying more than 1,500 combat sorties. Following the ceasefire, continued to support peace-keeping operations with periodic aircraft deployments to Saudi Arabia. Continued training operations from Moody AFB throughout the 1990s, stood down in early 2001 when Moody was realigned to a rescue/special operations base and host 347th Fighter Wing was inactivated.

=== Reserve fighter training ===
Reactivated in February 2010 at Luke Air Force Base in the Air Force Reserve with a mission to train Air Force Reserve Command pilots in combat tactics with the F-16 Fighting Falcon. The squadron assumed the mission, personnel and aircraft of the 301st Fighter Squadron, which was simultaneously inactivated.

== Lineage ==
- Constituted as the 69th Pursuit Squadron (Interceptor) on 20 November 1940

Activated on 15 January 1941
Redesignated 69th Fighter Squadron on 15 May 1942
Redesignated 69th Fighter Squadron, Single Engine on 20 August 1943
Inactivated on 27 January 1946

- Redesignated 69th Fighter-Bomber Squadron on 25 June 1952

Activated on 10 July 1952
Inactivated on 1 July 1958

- Redesignated 69th Tactical Fighter Training Squadron on 22 August 1969

Activated on 15 October 1969
Inactivated on 16 March 1983

- Redesignated 69th Tactical Fighter Squadron on 14 April 1983

Activated on 1 July 1983
Redesignated 69th Fighter Squadron on 1 November 1991
Inactivated on 2 February 2001

- Activated in the reserve on 1 February 2010

=== Assignments ===
- 58th Fighter Group, 15 January 1941 – 27 January 1946
- 58th Fighter-Bomber Group, 10 July 1952 (attached to Thirteenth Air Force 26 January 1955, Air Task Force Five, Provisional 17 February–9 March 1955; Air Task Force Thirteen, Provisional 2 April–2 June 1956; Air Task Force Thirteen, Provisional c. 11 October–30 November 1956; Air Task Force Thirteen, Provisional after 18 September 1957) (Note: The last three provisional task forces are considered to be different units despite bearing the same name.)
- 58th Fighter-Bomber Wing, 8 November 1957 – 1 July 1958 (remained attached to Air Task Force Thirteen, Provisional until 10 December 1957)
- 58th Tactical Training Wing, 15 October 1969 – 16 March 1983
- 347th Tactical Fighter Wing, 1 July 1983 (attached to 388th Tactical Fighter Wing, Provisional 8 January 1991; 4404th Tactical Fighter Wing, Provisional after 16 March 1991)
- 347th Operations Group, 1 May 1991 – 2 February 2001 (remained attached to 4404th Tactical Fighter Wing, Provisional [later 4404th Composite Wing, Provisional] until 30 June 1991)
- 944th Operations Group, 1 February 2010 – present

=== Stations ===
- Selfridge Field, Michigan, 15 January 1941
- Harding Field, Louisiana, 6 October 1941
- Dale Mabry Field, Florida, 3 March 1942
- Drew Field, Florida, 19 June 1942
- Sarasota Army Air Field, Florida, c. 25 July 1942
- Dale Mabry Field, Florida, 26 September 1942
- Richmond Army Air Base, Virginia, 16 October 1942
- Philadelphia Municipal Airport, Pennsylvania, 4 November 1942
- Bradley Field, Connecticut, c. 5 March 1943
- Bedford Army Air Base, Massachusetts, 1 May 1943
- Suffolk County Army Air Field, New York, 28 August 1943
- Grenier Field, New Hampshire, c. 15 September-22 October 1943
- Brisbane, Queensland, Australia, 21 November 1943
- Dobodura Airfield, New Guinea, 29 December 1943
- Saidor Airfield, New Guinea, 3 April 1944
- Kornasoren Airfield, Noemfoor, Schouten Islands, New Guinea, 6 September 1944
- San Roque Airfield, Leyte, Philippines, 18 November 1944)
- McGuire Field, Mindoro, Philippines, 22 December 1944)
- Mangaldan Airfield, Luzon, Philippines, c. 8 April 1945
- Porac Airfield, Luzon, Philippines, c. 17 April 1945
- Kadena Field, Okinawa, 8 July 1945
- Machinato Airfield, Okinawa, c. August 1945
- Japan, 26 October 1945
- Fort William McKinley, Luzon, Philippines, 28 December 1945 – 27 January 1946
- Taegu Air Base, South Korea, 10 July 1952 (deployed to Clark Air Base, Philippines 26 January–16 February 1955; Chiayi Air Base, Taiwan 17 February-c. 8 March 1955)
- Osan-ni Air Base (later Osan Air Base), South Korea, 9 March 1955 – 1 July 1958 (deployed to Tainan Air Base, Taiwan 2 April–2 June 1956, c. 11 October–30 November 1956; and 18 September – 4 November 1957; Kimpo Air Base, South Korea 19 July–10 September 1957; Chiayi Air Base, Taiwan 5 November–10 December 1957)
- Luke Air Force Base, Arizona, 15 October 1969 – 16 March 1983
- Moody Air Force Base, Georgia, 1 July 1983 – 1 February 2001 (deployed to Al Minhad Air Base, United Arab Emirates 8 January 1991, King Fahd International Airport, Saudi Arabia 29 January 1991), Al Minhad Air Base, United Arab Emirates 5 March 1991, Al Kharj Air Base, Saudi Arabia 16 March 1991, Dhahran Air Base, Saudi Arabia 16–30 June 1991)
- Luke Air Force Base, Arizona, 1 Feb 2010 – present

=== Aircraft ===
- Seversky P-35 (1941–1942)
- Curtiss P-36 Hawk (1941–1942)
- Bell P-39 Airacobra (1941–1942)
- Curtiss P-40 Warhawk (1942–1943)
- Republic P-47 Thunderbolt (1943–1945)
- Republic F-84 Thunderjet (1952–1954)
- North American F-86 Sabre (1954–1958)
- Lockheed F-104 Starfighter (1969–1983)
- McDonnell F-4 Phantom II (1983–1988)
- General Dynamics F-16 Fighting Falcon (1988–2001, 2010 – present
