= Buna =

Buna may refer to:

== Places ==
- Buna, Mostar, a village in Bosnia and Herzegovina at the confluence of the Buna and Neretva rivers
- Buna, Kenya, a town in Wajir County
- Buna, Ivory Coast, a town in Zanzan District
- Buna, Papua New Guinea, a village in Oro Province, Papua New Guinea
  - Buna Airfield, an aerodrome located near Buna, Papua New Guinea
- Buna, Texas, a census-designated place in Jasper County
- Buna concentration camp, a Nazi concentration camp run during WWII

== Rivers and other waterbodies ==
- Buna (Adriatic Sea), a river in Albania and Montenegro (known as Bojana in Montenegro)
- Buna (Neretva), a Neretva tributary in Bosnia and Herzegovina
- Buna Bay, a bay and port of Papua New Guinea

== Languages ==
- Buna language, a Torricelli language of Papua New Guinea
- Mbum language or Buna language, an Adamawa language of Cameroon

== Rubber ==
- Buna rubber, tradename for Polybutadiene, a synthetic rubber
- Buna Werke Schkopau, a former IG Farben synthetic rubber plant near Halle (Saale), Germany, later VEB Chemische Werke Buna
- Monowitz Buna Werke, a former IG Farben synthetic rubber plant with an attached Nazi German labor camp near Oswiecim, Poland

== Ships ==
- HMAS Buna (L 132), a Balikpapan-class heavy landing craft operated by the Royal Australian Navy
- JDS Buna (PF-294), a Tacoma-class frigate operated by the Japan Maritime Self-Defense Force

== People ==
- Buna Lawrie, an Australian Aboriginal musician

== Other uses ==
- Buna maflat, an Ethiopian coffee ceremony
- Buna (payment system), a project of the Arab Monetary Fund
- HD 16175 or Buna, a star
- Fagus crenata or buna, a deciduous tree of the beech family
- Sac de gemecs (Andorran: Buna), a type of bagpipe in Catalonia

== See also ==
- Bună Ziua, Cluj-Napoca, a housing district in Romania
