= 310th Fighter Squadron =

US Air Force unit

310th Fighter Squadron

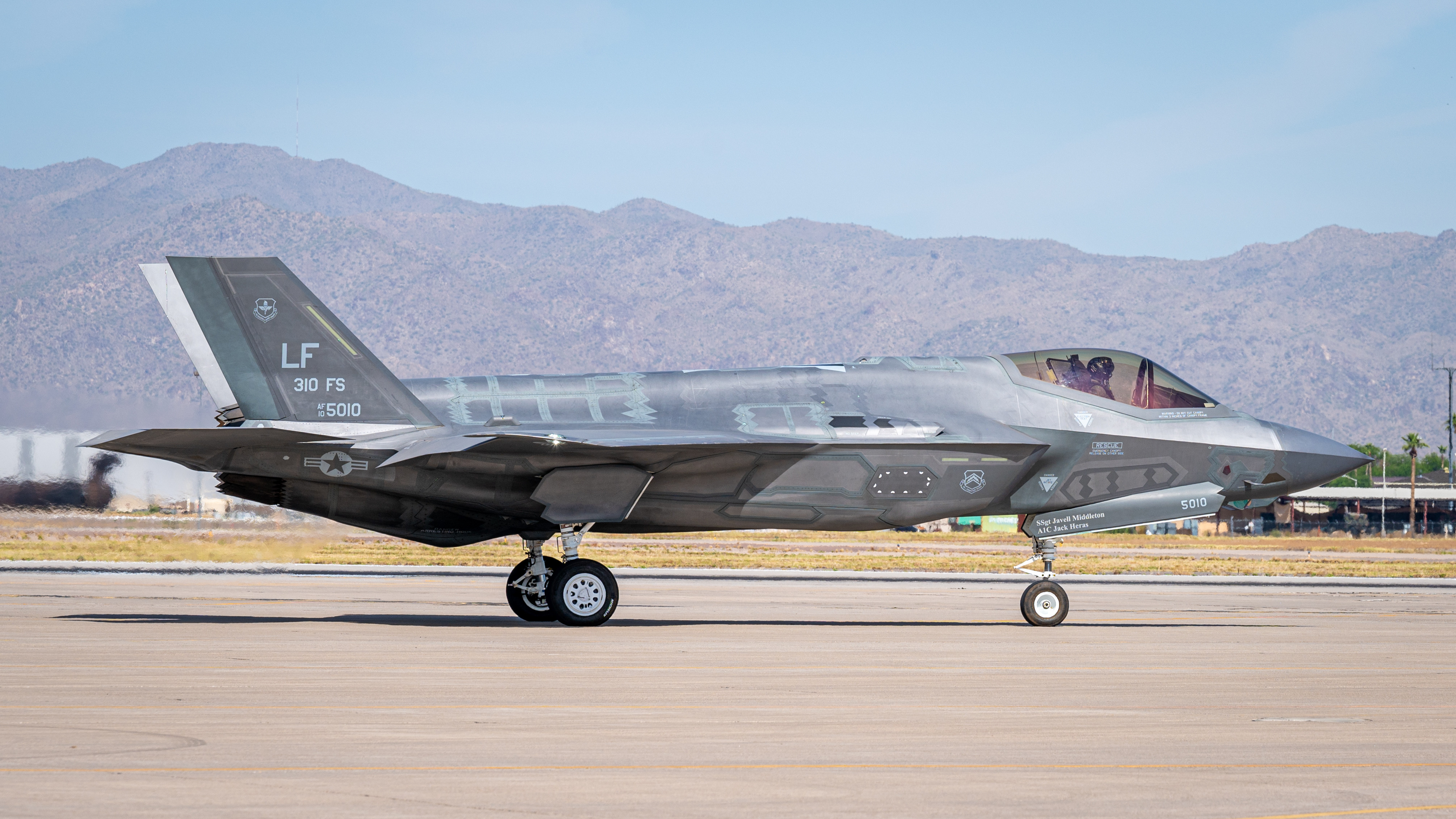
- Squadron flagship Lockheed Martin F-35A Lightning II taxiing during an inaugural sortie.
- Active: 1942–1946; 1952–1962; 1969–present
- Country: United States
- Branch: United States Air Force
- Role: Fighter Training
- Part of: Air Combat Command
- Garrison/HQ: Luke Air Force Base
- Nicknames: The Deterrents (1958–1962); Top Hats
- Motto: “Dressed to Kill”
- Decorations: Distinguished Unit Citation; Air Force Outstanding Unit Award; Presidential Unit Citation (Philippines); Republic of Korea Presidential Unit Citation

Insignia
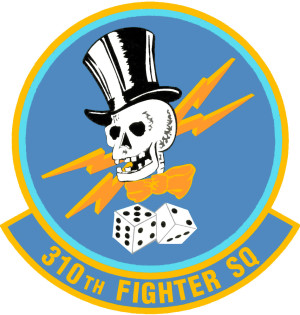
- 310th Fighter Squadron emblem (approved 9 October 1943, reinstated 6 November 1987)

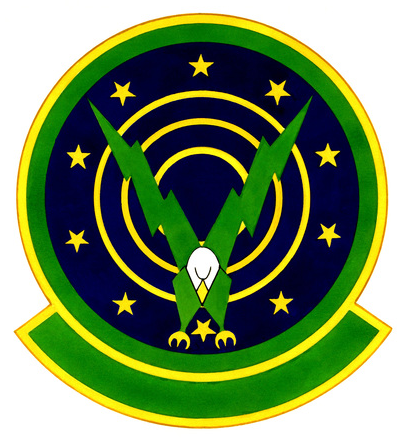
- 310th Tactical Fighter Training Squadron emblem (approved 18 May 1983)

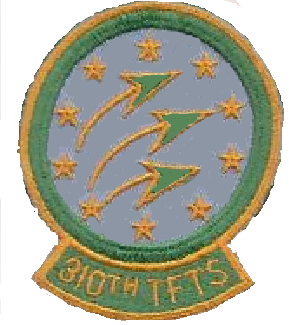
- Patch with 310th Tactical Fighter Training Squadron emblem (approved 7 April 1972)

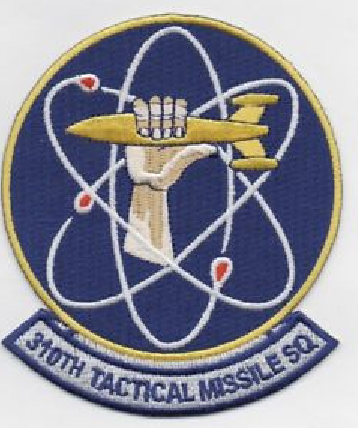
- Patch with 310th Tactical Missile Squadron emblem (approved 5 May 1961)

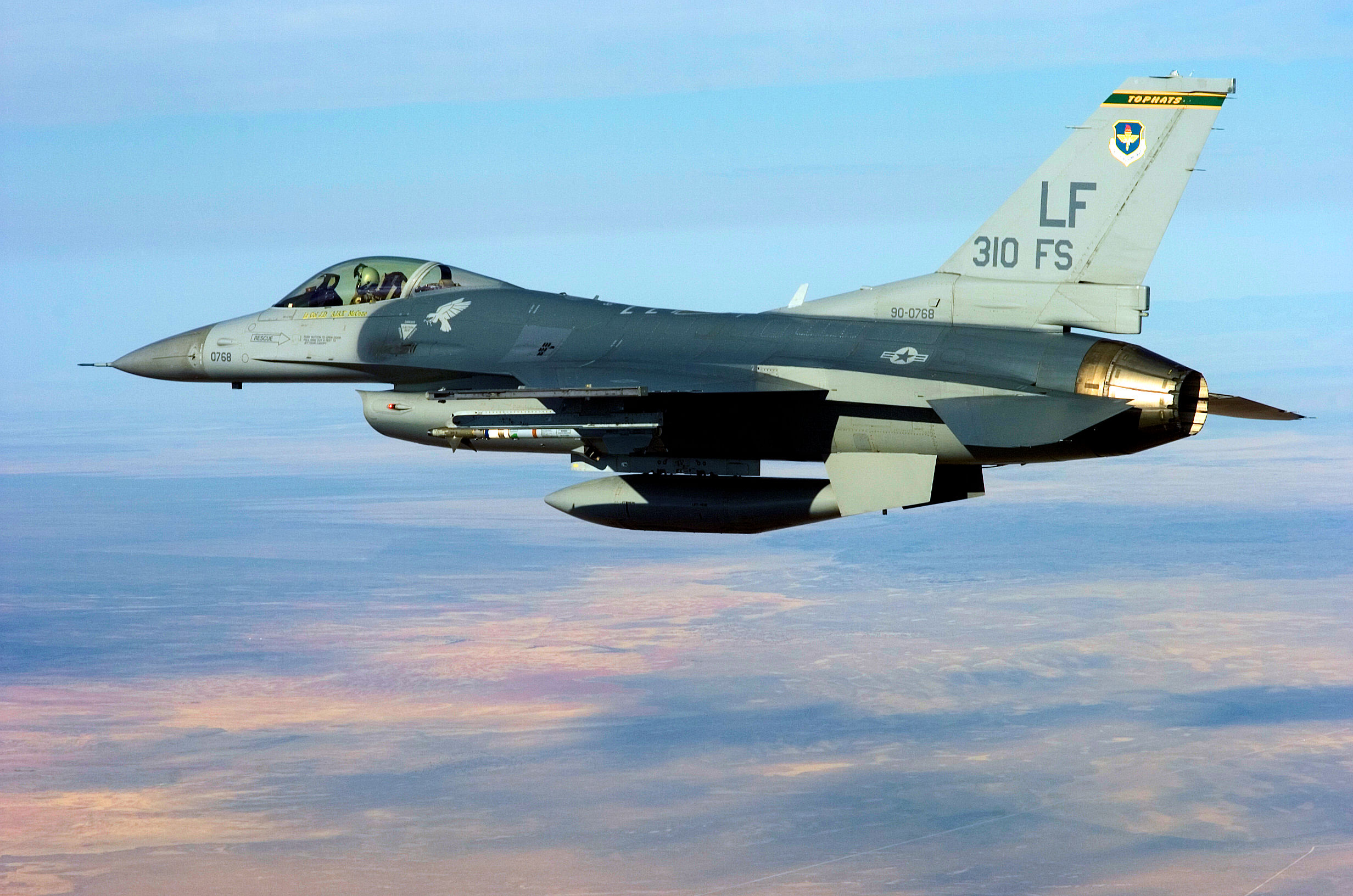
F-16C Block 42J Fighting Falcon 90-0768 flies over the White Sands Missile Range in New Mexico during a QF-4 drone.

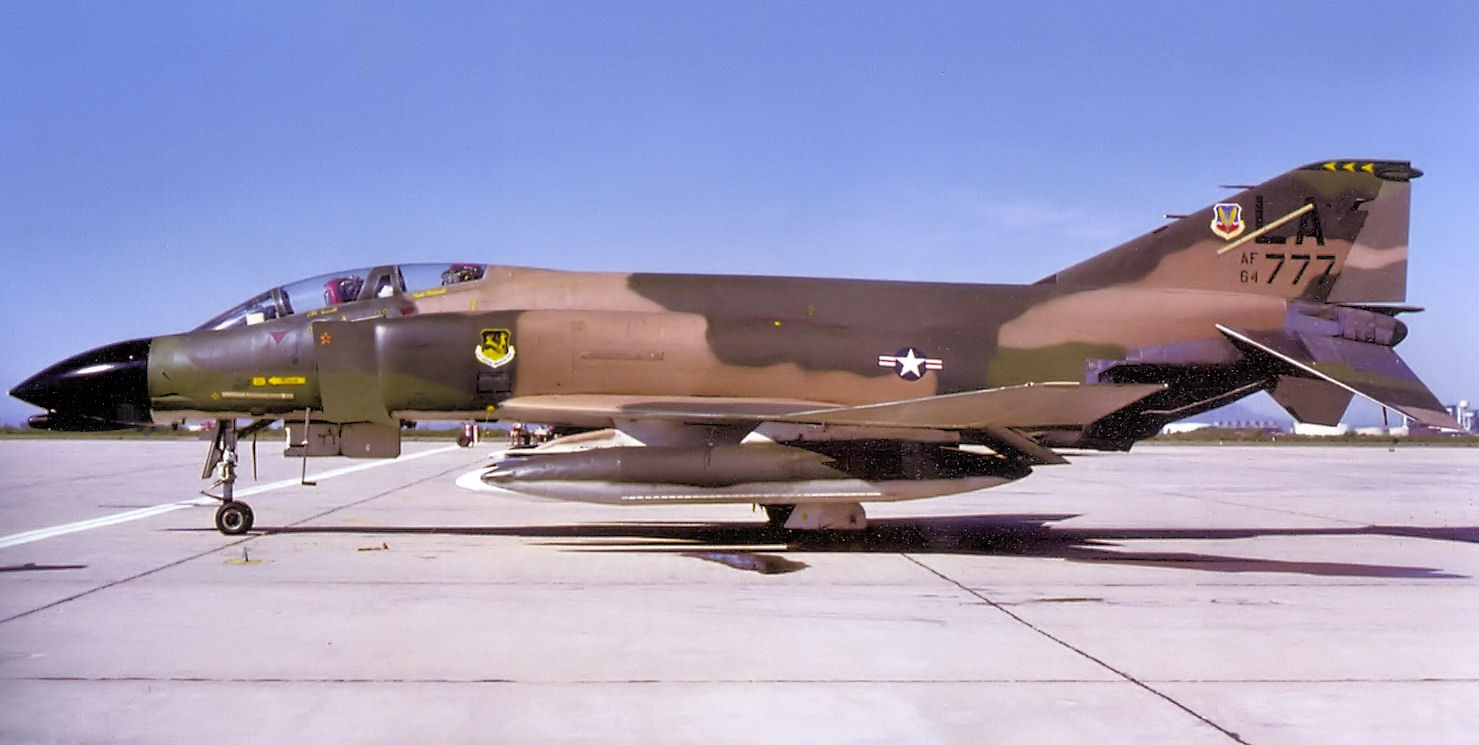
310th TFTS McDonnell F-4C-23-MC Phantom 64-0777, 1980. Note the red star on the intake, noting this aircraft shot down a MiG aircraft during the Vietnam War.

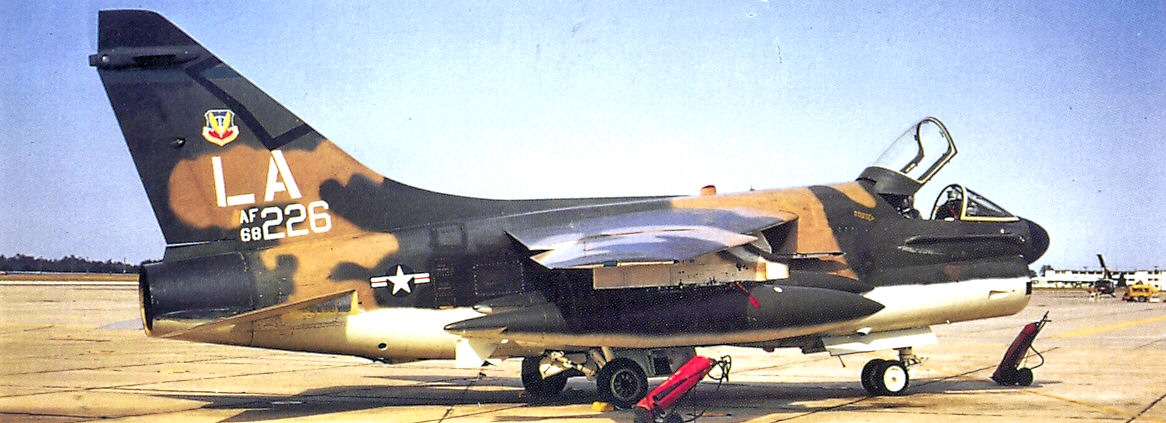
Ling-Temco-Vought A-7D-3-CV Corsair II (68-6226) of the 310th TFTS, May 1971.

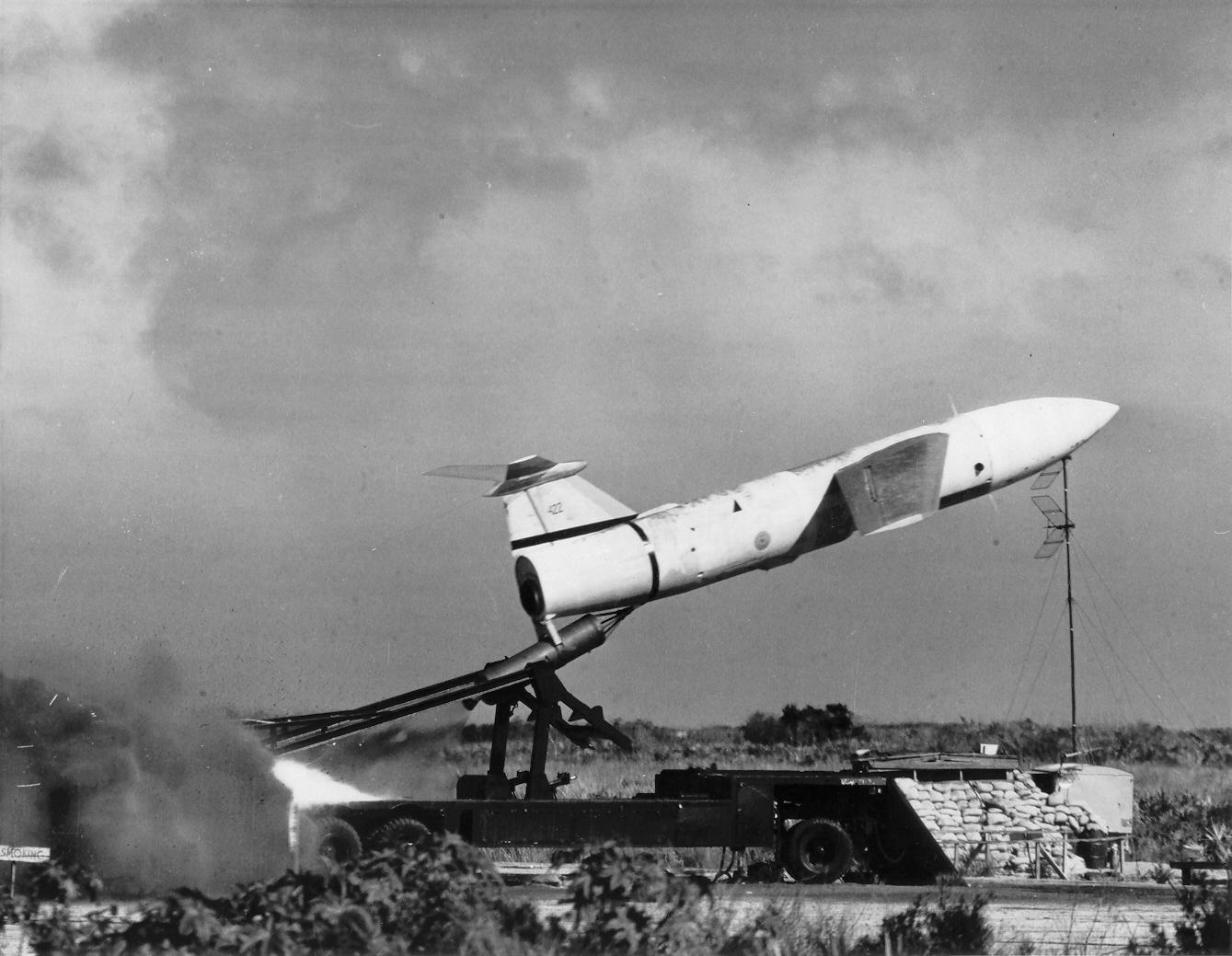
MGM-1 Matador

The 310th Fighter Squadron is part of the 56th Operations Group at Luke Air Force Base, Arizona. It operates the Lockheed Martin F-35A Lightning II, conducting advanced fighter training.

The unit, which adopted its original "Tophat" name in September 1987, has earned two Distinguished Unit Citations, Philippine Presidential Unit Citation, Republic of Korea Presidential Unit Citation, and nine Air Force Outstanding Unit Awards.

== Mission ==
The 310th Fighter Squadron ("Top Hats"), fly the Lockheed Martin F-35A Lightning II to conduct aircraft specific training for instructor pilots and initial qualification pilots for Air Combat Command assignments.

== History ==
=== World War II ===
The 310th Fighter Squadron was constituted on 21 January 1942, as the 310th Pursuit Squadron (Interceptor) and was activated on 9 February at Harding Field, Louisiana, where it flew the Bell P-39 Airacobra and Curtiss P-40 Warhawk aircraft. During 1942 and early 1943 the squadron was both an Operational and a Replacement Training Unit initially under III Fighter Command, being reassigned to I Fighter Command in October 1942. Also was part of the air defense of the Northeast United States, being a component of several Air Defense fighter wings (Philadelphia, New York, Boston), under First Air Force.

Was converted into an operational squadron in March 1943 at Bradley Field, Connecticut, being re-equipped with Republic P-47 Thunderbolts. Was deployed to the Southwest Pacific Theater, being assigned to Fifth Air Force in Australia in November 1943. Began combat operations in February 1944, providing protection for U.S. bases and escorting transports initially, then escorting bombers over New Guinea and sea convoys to Admiralty Islands. From Noemfoor, bombed and strafed Japanese airfields and installations on Ceram, Halmahera, and the Kai Islands.

Moved to the Philippines in Nov, flew fighter sweeps against enemy airfields, supported U.S. ground forces, and protected sea convoys and transport routes.

Beginning in June 1945, the Mexican squad, Escuadron 201 initially flew missions with the 310th Fighter Squadron, often twice a day, using borrowed U.S. aircraft. It received 25 new P-47D-30-RA aircraft in July, marked with the insignia of both the USAAF and Mexican Air Force. The squadron flew more than 90 combat missions, totaling more than 1,900 hours of flight time. They participated in the Allied effort to bomb Luzon and Formosa to push the Japanese out of those islands.

Beginning in July 1945, attacked railways, airfields, and enemy installations in Korea and Kyushu, Japan from Okinawa. After V-J Day, flew reconnaissance missions over Japan. Moved without personnel or equipment to the Philippines in Dec to be inactivated in January 1946 at Fort William McKinley, Luzon.

=== Cold War ===
==== Fighter operations in Korea ====
Reactivated during the Korean War at Taegu Air Base, South Korea, being redesignated the 310th Fighter-Bomber Squadron. First equipped with the Republic F-84G Thunderjet, the squadron adopted the North American F-86 Sabre in 1954 and kept it through 1958. During the Korean War, the squadron flew primarily air-to-ground missions supporting ground operations. The 310th participated in the Korea Summer-Fall 1952, Third Korean Winter, and Korean Summer-Fall 1953 campaigns, the squadron again distinguished itself, earning the Republic of Korea Presidential Unit Citation. After the armistice in 1953, the squadron moved to Osan Air Base on 19 March 1955.

==== Tactical missile operations ====
In 1958 the 310th gave up its F-86s when it became the 310th Missile Squadron on 15 June 1958, assigned to the 58th Tactical Missile Group. It remained the home of the surface-to-air TM-61 Matador missile. As the 498th Tactical Missile Group on Okinawa became operational with the TM-76 Mace, which was more capable and had longer range that the 310th's Matadors, the need for missiles in South Korea ended and the squadron was inactivated on 25 March 1962.

=== Fighter training ===
On 1 December 1969, the squadron resurfaced as the 310th Tactical Fighter Training Squadron 1 December 1969: two weeks later, on 15 December 1969 Luke Air Force Base, assuming the personnel and equipment of the provisional 4514th Combat Crew Training Squadron. Initially flying the new A-7 Corsair II ground attack aircraft, aircraft carrying tail code "LA" with blue tail stripes. Began transition to the McDonnell F-4C Phantom II in July 1971, assuming training mission from Davis–Monthan AFB units. Operated the F-4C until April 1982. aircraft carrying green fin caps. The squadron started phasing out the F-4 for the Block 1 General Dynamics F-16A Fighting Falcon in 1982, with the distinction of operating the first production F-16 #78-0001. Deactivation with the F-4C was on 4 November 1982. F-16s initially tail coded "LA", recoded to "LF" on 1 January 1983.

In the early years of operation with the F-16, the squadron patch was very different and the squadron name was Falcons. Eventually the 310th would return to the patch style used in World War II with a tophat wearing skull with a pair of dice (see patch top of page). The squadron name changed as well to "Top Hats" which it has carried through to today.

In 1988 the 310th began receiving brand new block 42 F-16C/Ds to replace the F-16A/B. The 310th TFTS became the first unit to receive the block 42 and also became the first F-16 squadron to receive the LANTIRN night vision system. Instructor pilots assigned to the 310th developed and wrote the Replacement Training Unit syllabus for both the Block 40/42 and LANTIRN. They also developed the first LANTIRN tactics. Until the mid-1990s, the 310th was dedicated almost exclusively to the LANTIRN training mission.

On 1 November 1991 the 310th was re-designated simply as a Fighter Squadron. Although the word 'Training' was dropped, nothing in that role was changed and was the case for all USAF Tactical Fighter Training Squadrons at that time.

During the late 1990s with the growing use of night vision goggles the 310th has become the principle trainer in this role. It was several years later that the squadron began training night-vision goggle qualified pilots. Although now well known for night vision training, the 310th FS is also tasked with other pilot training normally in the realms of advanced pilot training. One such program is Forward Air Controller, of which the 310th FS is currently the only squadron in the USAF that trains F-16 pilots in this role. Each class lasts five weeks and includes twelve sorties intended to test technical knowledge of the program. The 310th Fighter Squadron on average graduates thirteen classes of FAC qualified pilots a year.

Beginning in April 2004 the 310th FS was tasked with all night vision goggle training. Pilots going through this training program have to be experienced as the night vision goggles prove to be very challenging. New pilots to the training program have known to follow stars in the sky thinking they are following their flight leader. In bad weather the goggles can be useless as they depend on some source of light. A common training element is to have students fly in a four ship formations on a strike mission having to fight their way in and out against enemy aggressors. In all, a trainee will face three to four weeks of training using the goggles including simulator time and eight sorties in the real jet. Although it fluctuates, the school often turns out 150 night vision goggle trained pilots a year.

In May 2023, remaining 310th aircraft and personnel merged with the 309th Fighter Squadron in support of transferring operations to the Lockheed Martin F-35A Lightning II. The 310th FS is Luke’s 5th operational F-35A unit.

== Lineage ==
- Constituted as the 310th Pursuit Squadron (Interceptor) on 21 January 1942

Activated on 9 February 1942
Redesignated 310th Fighter Squadron on 15 May 1942
Redesignated 310th Fighter Squadron, Single Engine on 20 August 1943
Inactivated on 20 February 1946

- Redesignated 310th Fighter-Bomber Squadron on 25 June 1952

Activated on 10 July 1952
Redesignated 310th Tactical Missile Squadron on 15 July 1958
Discontinued and inactivated on 25 March 1962

- Redesignated 310th Tactical Fighter Training Squadron on 11 December 1969

Activated on 15 December 1969
Redesignated 310th Fighter Squadron on 1 November 1991

=== Assignments ===
- 58th Pursuit Group (later 58th Fighter Group), 9 February 1942
- Fifth Air Force, 27 January–20 February 1946
- 58th Fighter-Bomber Group, 10 July 1952 (attached to 58th Fighter-Bomber Wing after 1 March 1957)
- 58th Fighter-Bomber Wing, 8 November 1957
- 314th Air Division, 1 July 1958
- 58th Tactical Missile Group, 15 July 1958 – 25 March 1962
- 58th Tactical Fighter Training Wing (later 58 Tactical Training Wing), 15 December 1969
- 58th Operations Group, 1 October 1991
- 56th Operations Group, 1 April 1994 – present

=== Stations ===
- Harding Field, Louisiana, 9 February 1942
- Dale Mabry Field, Florida, 4 March 1942
- Richmond Army Air Base, Virginia, 16 October 1942
- Philadelphia Municipal Airport, Pennsylvania, 24 October 1942
- Bradley Field, Connecticut, 5 March 1943
- Hillsgrove Army Air Field, Rhode Island, 28 April 1943
- Grenier Field, New Hampshire, 16 September–22 October 1943
- Brisbane, Queensland, Australia, c. 23 November 1943
- Dobodura Airfield, New Guinea, 28 December 1943
- Saidor Airfield, New Guinea, c. 2 April 1944
- Kornasoren Airfield Noemfoor, Schouten Islands, New Guinea, 6 September 1944
- San Roque Airfield, Leyte, Philippines, 18 November 1944
- McGuire Field, Mindoro, Philippines, 22 December 1944
- Mangaldan Airfield, Luzon, Philippines, 6 April 1945
- Porac Airfield, Luzon, Philippines, 18 April 1945
- Machinato Airfield, Okinawa, 9 July 1945
- Japan, 26 October 1945
- Fort William McKinley, Luzon, Philippines, 28 December 1945 – 20 February 1946
- Taegu Air Base (K-2), South Korea, South Korea, 10 July 1952
- Osan-ni Air Base (later Osan Air Base), South Korea, 19 March 1955 – 25 March 1962
- Luke Air Force Base, Arizona, 15 December 1969 – present

=== Aircraft and missiles ===
- Bell P-39 Airacobra (1942)
- Curtiss P-40 Warhawk (1942–1943)
- Republic P-47 Thunderbolt (1943–1945)
- Republic F-84 Thunderjet (1952–1954)
- North American F-86 Sabre (1954–1958)
- Martin TM-61 Matador (1958–1962)
- LTV A-7 Corsair II (1969–1971)
- McDonnell F-4 Phantom II (1971–1982)
- General Dynamics F-16 Fighting Falcon (1982–2023)
- Lockheed Martin F-35A Lightning II (2023-present)

== See also ==
- List of United States Air Force missile squadrons
