= 672d Technical Training Squadron =

Inactive United States Air Force unit

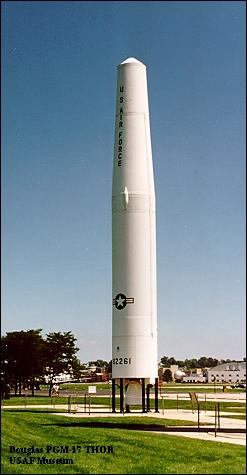
- SM-75 Thor missile
- Active: 1943–1945; 1958–1959
- Country: United States
- Branch: United States Air Force
- Role: Missile training
- Nickname(s): Tomahawkers
- Engagements: Southwest Pacific Theater
- Decorations: Distinguished Unit Citation; Philippine Presidential Unit Citation

Insignia
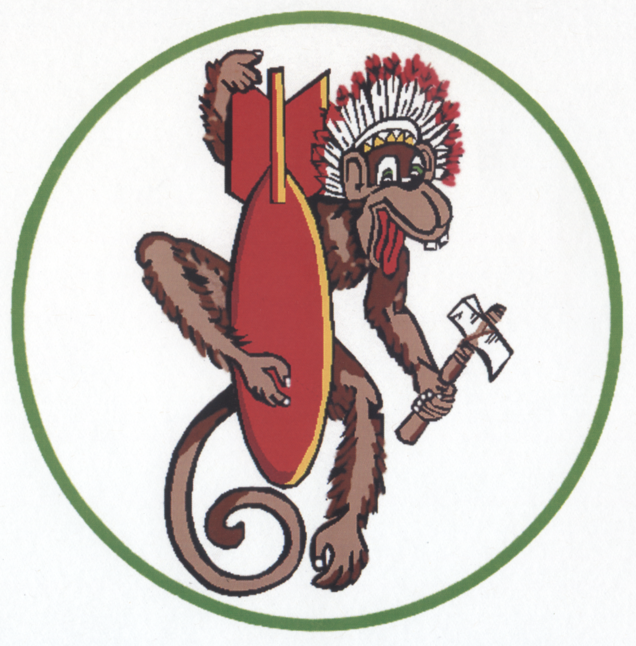
- 672d Technical Training Squadron Emblem (Note: Approved 16 August 1943. Description: On a white disc, bordure light yellow-green, a caricatured brown and white monkey wearing red and white Indian headdress, holding a white tomahawk in the left hand and grasping a large red aerial bomb, falling palewise with the right arm and leg.)

The 672d Technical Training Squadron is an inactive United States Air Force unit. Its last assignment was with the 705th Strategic Missile Wing at RAF Lakenheath, England, where it was inactivated on 1 October 1959.

During World War II, the squadron operated in the Southwest Pacific Theater as a light bomber unit during the New Guinea and Philippines campaigns. It was awarded both the Distinguished Unit Citation and the Philippine Presidential Unit Citation for its combat service.

The squadron was reactivated as a missile unit in 1958. After it was qualified with the SM-75 Thor, it moved to England, where it trained Royal Air Force crews to operate and maintain the missile. When training was completed, the unit inactivated.

== History ==
=== World War II ===
==== Training in the United States ====
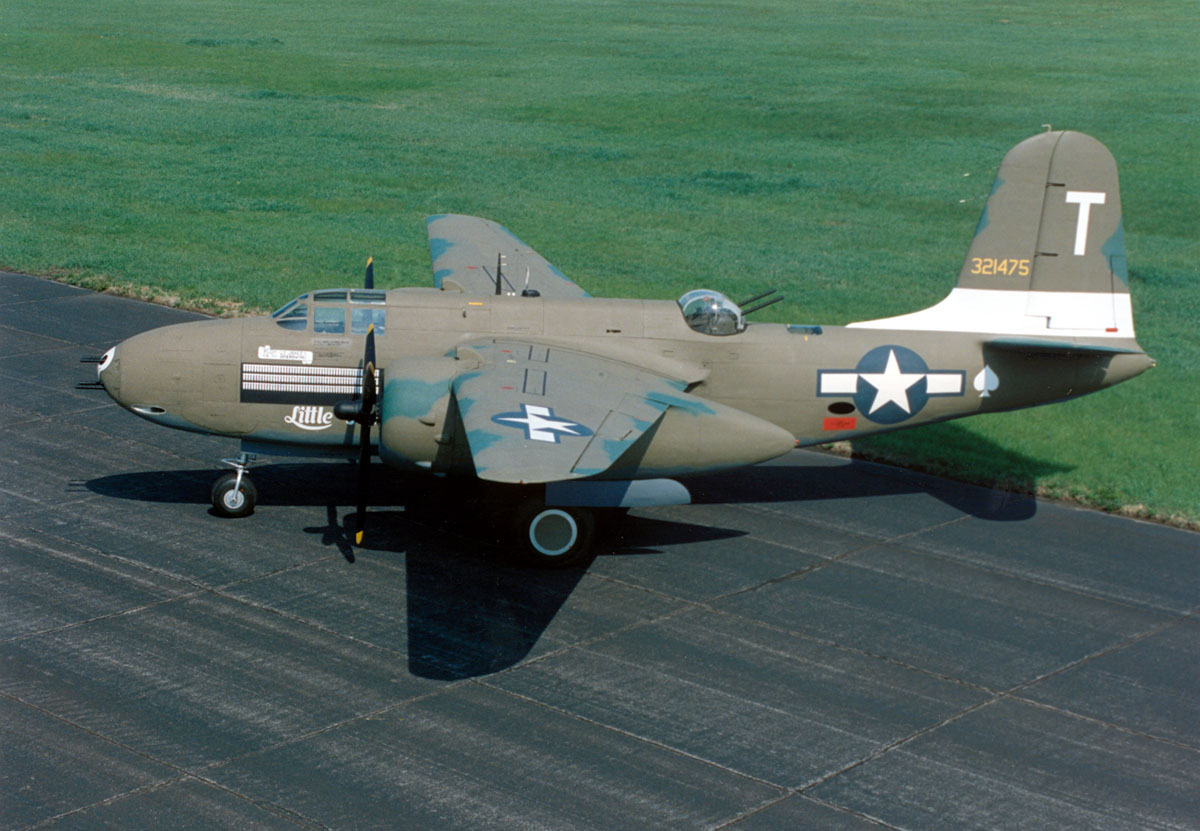
National Museum of the USAF Douglas A-20 in Southwest Pacific markings

The 672d Bombardment Squadron was activated in the spring of 1943 at Will Rogers Field, Oklahoma as one of the original squadrons of the 417th Bombardment Group The squadron drew its initial cadre from the 46th and 416th Bombardment Groups. Once assigned, the 672d's key personnel traveled to Orlando Army Air Base in mid-April where they received combat training from the Army Air Forces School of Applied Tactics.

The first Douglas A-20 Havocs arrived to equip the squadron in mid-May along with some DB-7 export models of the Havoc. Initial training of the 672d was conducted by the 46th Bombardment Group, the Operational Training Unit at Will Rogers Field. The unit then moved to DeRidder Army Air Base, Louisiana for advanced training. From August to September the 672d operated with the II Tactical Air Division, giving low level support to ground units on maneuvers. Once training was completed The squadron departed the San Francisco Port of Embarkation by ship on New Year's Day 1944.

==== Combat in the Southwest Pacific ====
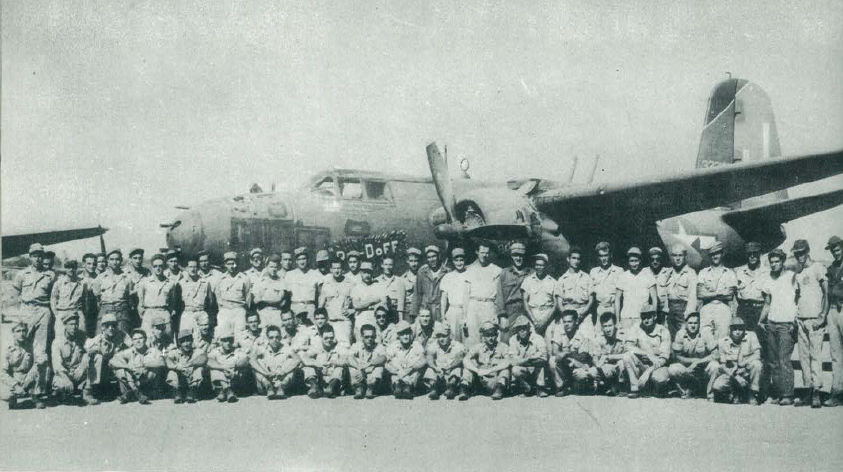
Combat Crews of the 672d Bombardment Squadron and one of the squadron's Douglas A-20 Havocs in the Southwest Pacific Theater

The squadron arrived in New Guinea in late January 1944, where it became part of Fifth Air Force. It began combat in March, operating in support of ground forces on New Guinea and striking airfields, bridges, personnel concentrations, installations, and shipping in the area. The 672d participated with other Fifth Air Force units in attacks on shipping and enemy airstrips near Hollandia on 16 April that resulted in the destruction of 298 enemy planes.

The unit operated from Noemfoor from September to December 1944, attacking airfields and installations on Ceram, Halmahera, and western New Guinea. Noemfoor operations included attacks on oil installations. The squadron moved to the Philippines in December 1944 at the end of the New Guinea campaign. The unit's ground crews left Noemfoor by ship while the aircrew flew to the Philippines once the advance party had prepared McGuire Field for use in late December. While en route, the convoy transporting the ground echelon endured two Japanese air attacks.

The squadron received a Distinguished Unit Citation for attacking Japanese convoys at Lingayen between 30 December 1944 and 2 January 1945, an action that not only impaired enemy shipping and supply strength, but also helped to clear the way for the American invasion of Luzon. During these attacks the 417th group sank 36,000 tons of shipping including a freighter, a destroyer escort and several transports.

Until June 1945 the 672d supported ground forces and continued to attack enemy airfields, transportation, and installations on Luzon, Cebu, Negros, and Mindanao. The squadron flew its last missions in July, dropping propaganda leaflets to Japanese troops on Luzon. After the Philippines were secured, the group turned its attention to Japanese targets on Formosa in early 1945. It moved to Okinawa in August 1945 and to Itami Air Base, Japan in November, where it was inactivated on 15 November 1945.

=== Cold War ===
The squadron was reactivated at the beginning of 1958 at Cooke Air Force Base, California as the 672d Strategic Missile Squadron and trained with the SM-75 Thor intermediate-range ballistic missile. In May the squadron, now renamed the 672d Technical Training Squadron, moved to England where it trained Royal Air Force missile crews to operate and maintain the Thor as part of Project Emily. When training was completed and the missiles turned over to the RAF the squadron was inactivated on 1 October 1959.

== Lineage ==
- Constituted as the 672d Bombardment Squadron (Light) on 23 March 1943

Redesignated 672d Bombardment Squadron, Light in 1944
Activated on 28 March 1943
Inactivated on 15 November 1945

- Redesignated 672d Strategic Missile Squadron on 12 December 1957

Activated on 1 January 1958
Redesignated: 672d Technical Training Squadron on 25 April 1958
Inactivated on 1 October 1959

=== Assignments ===
- 417th Bombardment Group: 28 March 1943 – 15 November 1945
- Air Research and Development Command: 1 January 1958
- 704th Strategic Missile Wing: 1 January 1958
- 705th Strategic Missile Wing: 20 May 1958 – 1 October 1959

=== Stations ===
- Will Rogers Field, Oklahoma, 28 March 1943
- DeRidder Army Air Base, Louisiana, 4 August 1943 – 10 December 1943
- Cape Sudest Airfield, New Guinea, 28 January 1944
- Dobodura Airfield, New Guinea, 4 February 1944
- Saidor Airfield, New Guinea, 10 April 1944
- Kornasoren Airfield Noemfoor, Schouten Islands, New Guinea, c. 10 September 1944
- Tacloban Airfield, Leyte, Philippines, 6 December 1944
- McGuire Field, Mindoro, Philippines, 22 December 1944
- Motobu Airfield, Okinawa, 17 August 17, 1945
- Itami Air Base, Japan, 3 November 1945 –15 November 1945
- Cooke Air Force Base, California, 1 January 1958
- RAF Feltwell, England, 20 May 1958
- RAF Lakenheath, England, 17 August 1959 – 1 October 1959

=== Aircraft and missiles ===
- Douglas A-20 Havoc, 1943–1945
- SM-75 Thor, 1958–1959

=== Awards and campaigns ===
Award streamer	Award	Dates	Notes
	Distinguished Unit Citation	30 December 1944-2 January 1945	Philippine Islands
	Philippine Republic Presidential Unit Citation	17 October 1944-4 July 1945	

Campaign Streamer	Campaign	Dates	Notes
	New Guinea	28 January 1944 – 31 December 1944	
	Leyte	17 October 1944 – 1 July 1945	
	Luzon	15 December 1944 – 4 July 1945	
	Southern Philippines	27 February 1945 – 4 July 1945	

== See also ==
- List of United States Air Force missile squadrons
- List of Douglas A-20 Havoc operators
