= McGuire Field =

McGuire Field may refer to:

- San Jose Airport (Mindoro), in San Jose, Occidental Mindoro in the Philippines
- McGuire Air Force Base, in Burlington County, New Jersey, United States
