= 417th Bombardment Group =

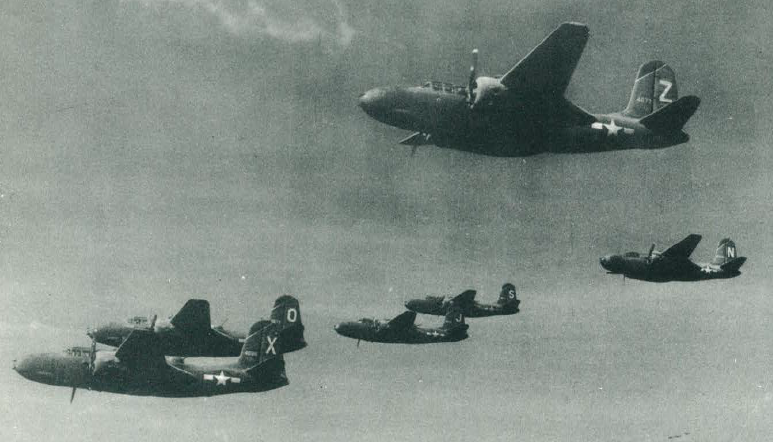
- Douglas A-20s of the 417th Bombardment Group showing markings adopted in the Southwest Pacific Theater
- Active: 1943–1945
- Country: United States
- Branch: United States Air Force
- Role: Light bomber
- Nickname: Sky Lancers
- Engagements: South West Pacific Theater of World War II
- Decorations: Distinguished Unit Citation; Philippine Republic Presidential Unit Citation

Insignia
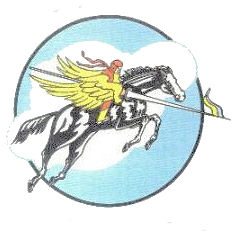
- 417th Bombardment Group Insigne (unofficial)

The 417th Bombardment Group is an inactive United States Army Air Forces unit. Its last assignment was with V Bomber Command at Itami Airfield, Japan, where it was inactivated on 5 November 1945.

During World War II, the group operated in the Southwest Pacific Theater as a light bombardment unit during the New Guinea and Philippines campaigns. It was awarded both the Distinguished Unit Citation and the Philippine Presidential Unit Citation for its combat service.

== History ==
Media related to 417th Bombardment Group (United States Army Air Forces) at Wikimedia Commons

=== Training in the United States ===
The 417th Bombardment Group was activated in the spring of 1943 at Will Rogers Field, Oklahoma with the 672d, 673d, 674th, and 675th Bombardment Squadrons assigned. The group drew its initial cadre from the 46th and 416th Bombardment Groups. Once assigned, the 417th's key personnel travelled to Orlando Army Air Base in mid-April where they received combat training from the Army Air Forces School of Applied Tactics.

The first Douglas A-20 Havocs arrived to equip the group in mid-May along with some DB-7 export models of the Havoc. Initial training of the group was conducted by the 46th Bombardment Group, the Operational Training Unit at Will Rogers Field. The group then moved to DeRidder Army Air Base, Louisiana for advanced training. From August to September the 417th operated with the II Tactical Air Division giving low level support to ground units on maneuvers. Once training was completed The 417th departed the San Francisco Port of Embarkation by ship on New Year's Day 1944.

=== Combat in the Southwest Pacific ===
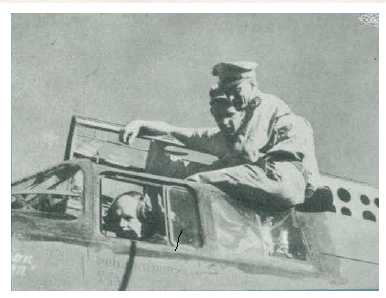
Charles Lindbergh with Col. Howard S. Elmore, commander of the 417th Bombardment Group in one of the group's A-20 Havocs in the Southwest Pacific Theater

The group arrived in New Guinea in late January 1944, where it became part of Fifth Air Force. It began combat in March, operating in support of ground forces on New Guinea and striking airfields, bridges, personnel concentrations, installations, and shipping in the area. The group participated with other Fifth Air Force units in attacks on shipping and enemy airstrips near Hollandia on 16 April that resulted in the destruction of 298 enemy planes.

Most sorties were flown at low level, since Japanese flak was not very intense. During these low level bombing operations, it was found that there was little need for a bombardier. Consequently, the bombardier was often replaced by additional forward-firing machine guns mounted in a faired-over nose. The A-20's heavy firepower, maneuverability, speed and bombload made it an appropriate weapon for pinpoint strikes against aircraft, hangars, and supply dumps. In formation, their heavy forward firepower could defeat shipboard anti-aircraft defenses and at low level the A-20s could skip their bombs into the sides of transports and destroyers with deadly effect. Some A-20s had their heavy forward-firing armament supplemented by clusters of three Bazooka-type rocket tubes underneath each wing. These tubes each held an M8, T-30 4.5-inch (110 mm) spin-stabilized rocket. These rocket launcher tubes turned out to be heavy and complicated, and were generally more trouble than they were worth and were not often used.

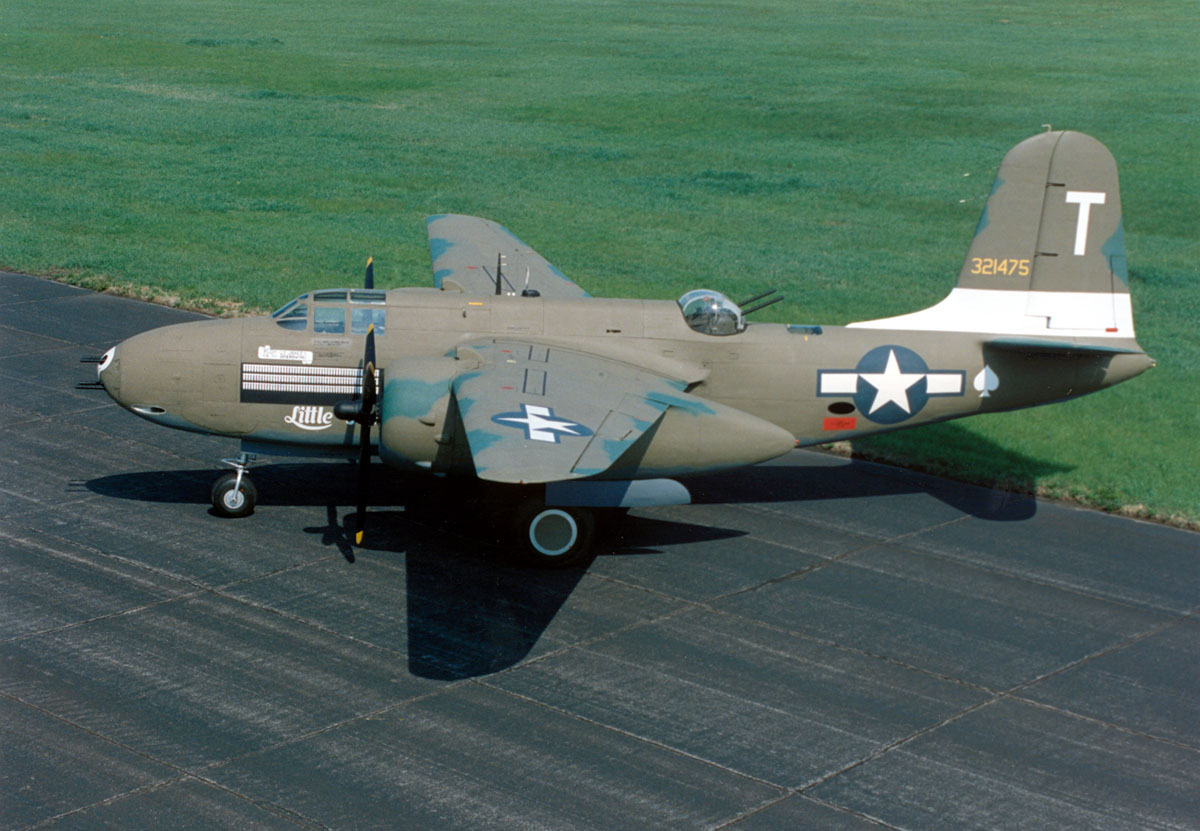
National Museum of the USAF Douglas A-20 in South West Pacific Theater markings

The unit operated from Noemfoor from September to December 1944, attacking airfields and installations on Ceram, Halmahera, and western New Guinea. Noemfoor operations included attacks on oil installations. The 417th moved to the Philippines in December 1944 at the end of the New Guinea campaign. The group's ground crews left Noemfoor by ship while the aircrew flew to the Philippines once the advance party had prepared McGuire Field for use in late December. While en route, the convoy transporting the ground echelon endured two Japanese air attacks.

The group received a Distinguished Unit Citation for attacking Japanese convoys at Lingayen between 30 December 1944 and 2 January 1945, an action that not only impaired enemy shipping and supply strength, but also helped to clear the way for the American invasion of Luzon. During the 2 January attack, the group commander, Lt. Col. Howard S. Ellmore, was lost to enemy fire. During these attacks the group sank 36,000 tons of shipping including a freighter, a destroyer escort and several transports.

Until June 1945 the 417th supported ground forces and continued to attack enemy airfields, transportation, and installations on Luzon, Cebu, Negros, and Mindanao. The group flew its last missions in July, dropping propaganda leaflets to Japanese troops on Luzon. After the Philippines were secured, the group turned its attention to Japanese targets on Formosa in early 1945. It moved to Okinawa in August 1945 and to Itami Air Base, Japan in November, where it was inactivated on 15 November 1945.

== Lineage ==
- Constituted as the 417th Bombardment Group (Light) on 23 March 1943

Activated on 28 March 1943
Inactivated on 15 November 1945

=== Assignments ===
- III Air Support Command, 28 March 1943
- 56th Bombardment Training Wing, 10 April 1943 – 10 December 1943 (attached to II Tactical Air Division, August 1943 – September 1943)
- V Bomber Command, 28 January 1944 – 1 November 1945 (attached to 309th Bombardment Wing, 25 August 1944 – 6 December 1944; 310th Bombardment Wing, 9 January 1945 – 1 November 1945)

=== Components ===
- 672d Bombardment Squadron: 23 March 1943 – 15 November 1945
- 673d Bombardment Squadron: 23 March 1943 – 15 November 1945
- 674th Bombardment Squadron: 23 March 1943 – 15 November 1945
- 675th Bombardment Squadron: 23 March 1943 – 15 November 1945

=== Stations ===
- Will Rogers Field, Oklahoma, 28 March 1943
- DeRidder Army Air Base, Louisiana, 4 August – 10 December 1943
- Cape Sudest Airfield, New Guinea, 28 January 1944
- Dobodura Airfield, New Guinea, 7 February 1944
- Saidor Airfield, New Guinea, 8 April 1944
- Kornasoren Airfield, Noemfoor, Schouten Islands, New Guinea c. 9 September 1944
- Tacloban Airfield, Leyte, Philippines, 6 December 1944
- McGuire Field, Mindoro, Philippines, 22 December 1944
- Motobu Airfield, Okinawa, 17 August 1945
- Itami Air Base, Japan, c. 1 November 1945 – 15 November 1945.

=== Aircraft ===
- Douglas A-20 Havoc, 1943–1945

=== Awards and campaigns ===
Award streamer	Award	Dates	Notes
	Distinguished Unit Citation	30 December 1944-2 January 1945	Philippine Islands
	Philippine Republic Presidential Unit Citation	17 October 1944-4 July 1945	

Campaign Streamer	Campaign	Dates	Notes
	New Guinea	28 January 1944 – 31 December 1944	
	Leyte	17 October 1944 – 1 July 1945	
	Luzon	15 December 1944 – 4 July 1945	
	Southern Philippines	27 February 1945 – 4 July 1945	

== See also ==
- List of Douglas A-20 Havoc operators
