= Girua Airport =

Airport in Oro, Papua New Guinea

Girua Airport (Dobodura No. 7 Airfield)
- IATA: PNP; ICAO: AYGR

Summary
- Airport type: Public
- Operator: Government
- Serves: Popondetta, Papua New Guinea
- Elevation AMSL: 311 ft (95 m)
- Coordinates: 08°48′16″S 148°18′32″E

Map
- Location of Girua Airport

Runways
| Direction | Length | | Surface |
| Direction | m | ft | Surface |
|---|---|---|---|
| 03/21 | 1,672 | 5,485 | Asphalt |
- Source: DAFIF

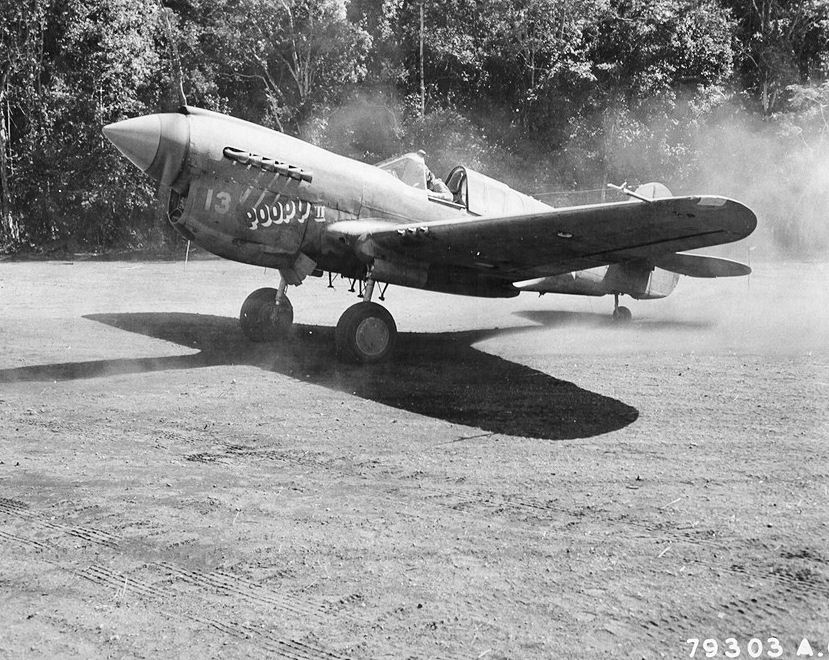
"Poopy II" P-40E Warhawk Assigned to 1st Lt. A.T. House, Jr. from the 7th Fighter Squadron, 49th Fighter Group. He was an ace with a total of 5 victories. Photo was taken while preparing to take-off after getting an alert for enemy aircraft at Dobodura in May 1943.

Girua Airport (IATA: PNP, ICAO: AYGR) is an airport serving Popondetta, a city in the Oro (or Northern) province in Papua New Guinea.

== History ==
Girua Airport is located near Dobodura, to the north-east of the Embi Lakes, north-east of Inonda. To the south is Mt. Lamington, a volcano that dominates the skyline. The airport was built during World War II as part of the Dobodura Airfield Complex during late 1942 and early 1943. During the war, the airfield had several names, including No. 7, West 7, or Horanda No. 7 Airstrip or West 7. It was also known as Kenney Strip, in honor of Fifth Air Force Commander General George Kenney.

The main Dobodura complex had eleven airstrips, most interconnected for taxiing purposes. At the height of the Battle of Buna-Gona supplies began landing at the airfields including artillery spotting planes, a 105mm and five Bren Gun Carriers used to assault Cape Endaiadere,

After the battle, Dobodura was developed into a major airbase, with storage and repair facilities, and interconnecting taxiways to adjacent airfields. Today, Girua is the only airfield still in use, the others being abandoned after the war.

=== Major USAAF units assigned ===
- 3d Bombardment Group (May 20, 1943 – February 3, 1944)

Headquarters, 13th, 89th, 90th Bomb Squadrons, North American B-25 Mitchell

- 22d Bombardment Group (October 9, 1943 – January 13, 1944)

Headquarters, 2d, 19th, 408th Bomb Squadrons, Martin B-26 Marauder

- 43d Bombardment Group (December 10, 1943 – March 4, 1944)

Headquarters, 63d, 64th, 65th, 403d Bomb Squadrons, Consolidated B-24 Liberator

- 90th Bombardment Group (December 1943 – February 23, 1944)

Headquarters, 319th, 320th, 321st, 400th Bomb Squadrons, B-24 Liberator

- 345th Bombardment Group (January 18 – February 16, 1944)

Headquarters, 498th, 499th, 500th, 501st Bomb Squadrons, B-25 Mitchell

- 417th Bombardment Group (February 7 – April 8, 1944), (Headquarters)

672d, 673d, 673d, 675th Bomb Squadrons, Douglas A-20 Havoc

- 49th Fighter Group (March – November 20, 1943)

Headquarters, 7th, 8th Fighter Squadrons, Curtiss P-40, 9th Fighter Squadron, Lockheed P-38 Lightning and Republic P-47 Thunderbolt

- 58th Fighter Group (December 28, 1943 – April 3, 1944)

Headquarters, 69th, 310th, 311th Fighter Squadrons, P-47 Thunderbolt

- 475th Fighter Group (August 14, 1943 – March 24, 1944) (Headquarters)

432d Fighter Squadron, P-38 Lightning, (May 15 – July 12, 1944), (North Borio Airfield, Dobodura No. 15)
433rd Fighter Squadron, P-38 Lightning, (August 14 – October 3, 1943), (Borio Airfield, Dobodura No. 11)

- 418th Night Fighter Squadron (V Fighter Command) (November 22, 1943 – March 28, 1944), Northop P-61 Black Widow
- 80th Fighter Squadron, (8th Fighter Group), (December 11, 1943 – February 28, 1944), P-38 Lightning
- 375th Troop Carrier Group, (August 19 – December 19, 1943) (HQ Echelon)

== Airlines and destinations ==
Girua Airport is connected to Port Moresby International Airport by Air Niugini and PNG Air, and to Tufi Airport by PNG Air.

== See also ==
- USAAF in the Southwest Pacific
