= Motobu Airfield =

- Motobu, Okinawa, Japan
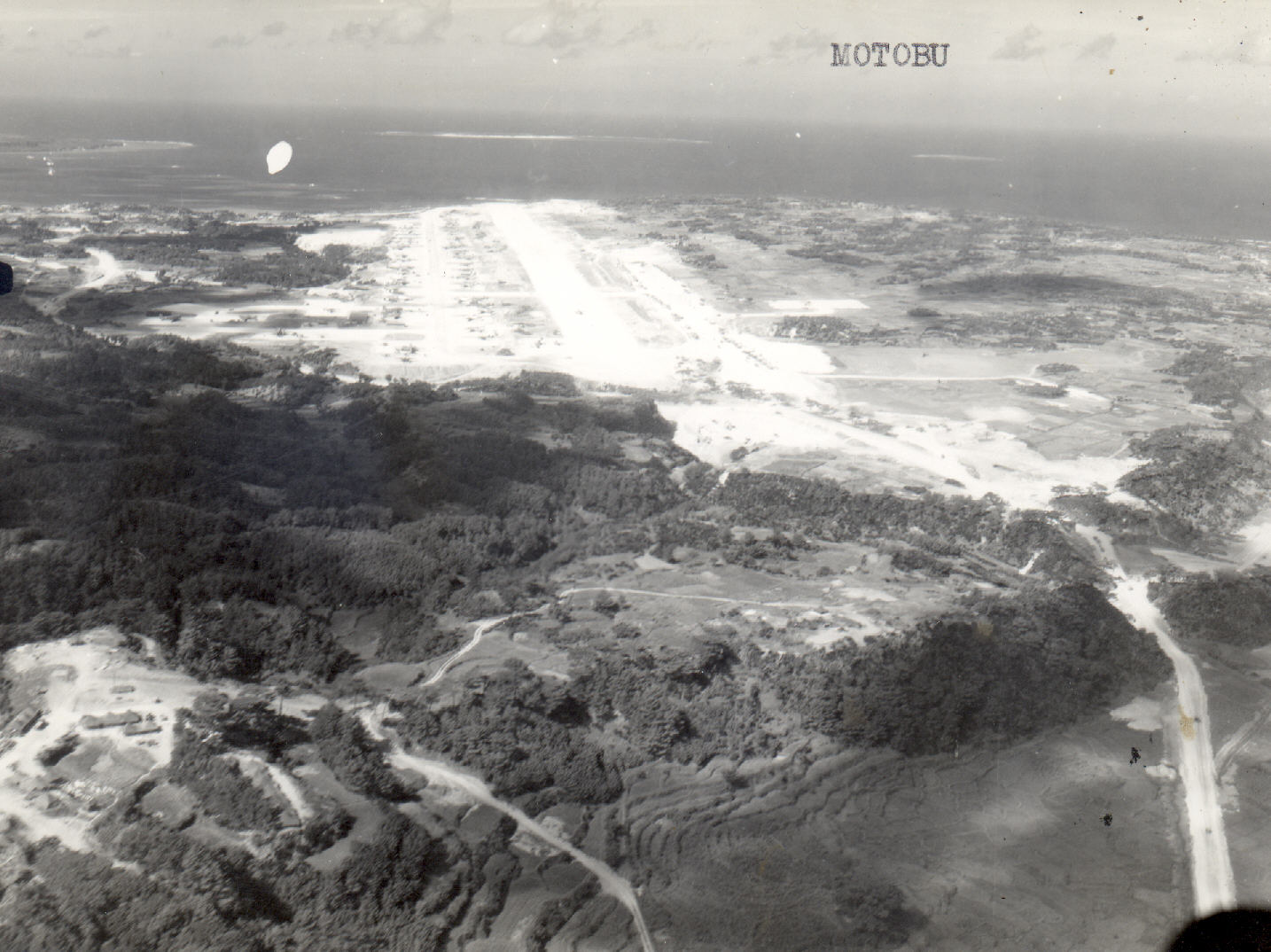
- Aerial view of Motobu airfield, Okinawa

Site information
- Type: Military airfield
- Controlled by: United States Army Air Forces

Location
- Coordinates: 26°41′009.15″N 127°53′23.90″E

Site history
- Built: April 1945
- In use: 1945

Motobu Airfield is a World War II airfield on the Motobu Peninsula of Okinawa, near the East China Sea coast. The airfield was deactivated after 1945.

== History ==
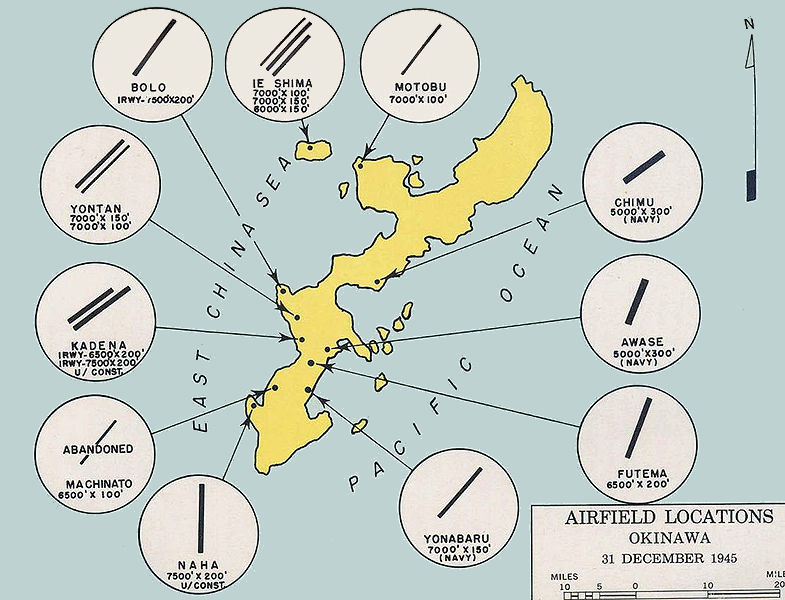
Location of Motobu Airfield

The airfield was built in April 1945 by the United States Army Corps of Engineers and United States Navy Seabees as a combat airfield to support the Army and Marine Corps ground forces during the Battle of Okinawa. It had a 7,000' x 100' single runway and was used as the support field for Headquarters, Fifth Air Force and its subordinate commands on Okinawa from August through October 1945 until they moved to Honshu, Japan for postwar occupation duty.

== Units assigned ==
- Headquarters, Fifth Air Force*, August 4 – September 25, 1945
- Headquarters, V Bomber Command*, August–October 1945
- Headquarters, V Fighter Command*, August–October 1945
- Headquarters, 308th Bombardment Wing*, June 16 – September 22, 1945

.* Assigned to nearby town of Hamasaki and used Motobu Airfield for air operations.

- Headquarters, 3d Bombardment Group, A-20 Havoc, August 6 – September 8, 1945

8th Bombardment Squadron, August 7 – October 26, 1945
13th Bombardment Squadron, August 7 – October 10, 1945
89th Bombardment Squadron, August 6 – September 8, 1945
90th Bombardment Squadron, August 6 – September 8, 1945

- Headquarters, 380th Bombardment Group, B-24 Liberator, August 9 – November 28, 1945

528th Bombardment Squadron, August 8 – November 28, 1945
529th Bombardment Squadron, August 18 – November 28, 1945
530th Bombardment Squadron, August 10 – November 28, 1945
531st Bombardment Squadron, August 15 – November 28, 1945

- Headquarters, 22d Bombardment Group, B-24 Liberator, August 15 – November 23, 1945

2d Bombardment Squadron, August 18 – November 23, 1945
19th Bombardment Squadron, August 14 – November 23, 1945
33d Bombardment Squadron, August 15 – November 23, 1945
408th Bombardment Squadron, August 21 – November 23, 1945

- Headquarters, 417th Bombardment Group, A-20 Havoc, August 17 – November 1, 1945

672d Bombardment Squadron, August 17 – November 3, 1945
673d Bombardment Squadron, August 18 – November 4, 1945
674th Bombardment Squadron, August 15 – November 1, 1945
675th Bombardment Squadron, August 17 – November 5, 1945

In addition to the Army units, several Navy aviation squadrons used the airfield. Its postwar use is undetermined. Today, parts of the runway can still be seen on aerial photography.

== See also ==
- Naval Base Okinawa
