= Bună Ziua, Cluj-Napoca =

Bună Ziua (Romanian for Good Day) is a housing district in Cluj-Napoca in Romania. It was erected after the Romanian Revolution of 1989, and is located on the southern side of the city.
