= Buna Airfield =

Abandoned airport in Oro, Papua New Guinea

Buna Airfield
- Buna in Papua New Guinea

Site information
- Condition: Abandoned

Location
- Shown within Papua New Guinea
- Coordinates: 8°40′S 148°24′E

Site history
- Built: Prewar
- In use: August 1942 - December 1942
- Fate: Disused

Buna Airfield was an aerodrome located near Buna, Papua New Guinea. Built as an emergency landing ground, it was extended during the Second World War by the Imperial Japanese. A new runway was under construction until both runways were neutralized by Allied air bombing in late 1942.

== History ==
Buna Airfield was built prewar with a single grass-surfaced runway, serving as an emergency landing ground. By 1942, the runway was in neglected condition. By mid-1942, the Allies acknowledged a need for an airfield in the Buna area. On July 1942, Theater plan “Tulsa” recognised the need for an Allied airfield in Buna for military aircraft operations. Following this, on 9 July, 1942 an Allied reconnaissance mission was scheduled of the area for the airfield. Two days later on July 11, 1942 a Royal Australian Air Force Consolidated PBY Catalina overflew the area to determine the location of an airfield and examine the terrain. However, the six officers that were onboard decided that the kunai plains at Dobodura were more suitable and necessary for development, rather than Buna Airfield.

=== Japanese occupation ===
On 21 July, 1942, the Japanese Army landed at the coastal village of Gona, and occupied Buna. Shortly thereafter, the Japanese began expanding the infrastructure of the prewar airfield for military usage. They installed aircraft revetments, and emplaced anti-aircraft gun positions. By early August 1942, the airfield was fully prepared for military use as a forward airfield. Buna Airfield was first subjected to American fury during the early days of 1942. Bombing raids conducted by the Fifth Air Force's A-20, B-17, and B-25 bombers was about the worst Buna suffered. Then, in July 1942, General George C. Kenney assumed command of what was by this time, little more than a motley collection of exhausted men and exhausted planes.

By late 1942, the Japanese Army had been pushed back to the north coast of Papua New Guinea. In order to defend the Buna area, they fortified the airfield, which included the installation of trenches and bunkers. During ground battle, the remaining anti-aircraft guns were instead used to fire against ground targets. During the Battle of Buna–Gona, Buna Airfield became a battleground as the 2/10th Australian Infantry Battalion pushed for capture. By nightfall, it occupied one third of the airfield. On December 24, 1942, the 2/10th was ordered to continue advance in support of four M3 Stuart tanks. However, the 75mm Type 88 anti-aircraft gun opened fire at short range, destroying all four tanks. The 2/10th was subjected to frequent counter-attacks, which resulted in significant loss.

Finally, by 27 December, 1942 Buna Airfield was captured by Allied forces. Around 15 A6M Zeros, 2 G6M1-L2 Betty and at least 1 D3A1 Val were captured, and some of which were subsequently loaded onto barges for Milne Bay, then Brisbane for technical evaluation at Eagle Farm Airfield.

== Present ==
After the war, Buna Airfield remained abandoned and disused ever since. Today, the airfield including old bunkers, trenches and gun pits remain in the area overgrown with kunai grass.

== Units ==
The following units that were based at Buna Airfield:

- 2nd Kōkūtai, equipped with A6M3 Hamp and D3A2 Val
- Tainan Kōkūtai, equipped with A6M3 Hamp
- 47th Anti-Aircraft Unit
