= Oro Bay Airfield =

World War II airfield in Papua New Guinea

Oro Bay (Cape Sudest) Airfield
- Part of Fifth Air Force
- Located in Oro Province, Papua New Guinea
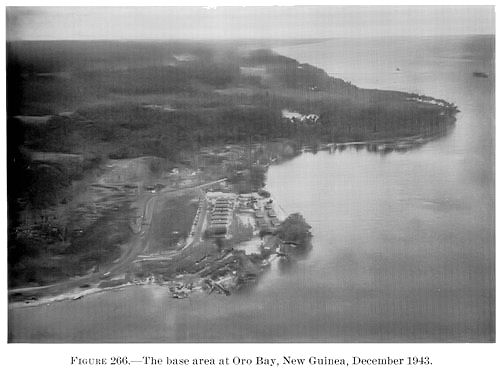
- Oro Bay Base - December 1943

Site information
- Type: Military airfield
- Controlled by: United States Army Air Forces

Location
- Coordinates: 08°40′16.37″S 148°24′42.44″E

Site history
- Built: 1944
- In use: 1944

Oro Bay Airfield (also known as Cape Sudest Airfield) is a former World War II airfield in Oro Province, Papua New Guinea. The airfield was abandoned after the war and today is almost totally returned to its natural state.

== History ==
Oro Bay Airfield was primarily an emergency landing field, although it was briefly used as a headquarters base for the 308th Bombardment Wing (1 February-2 July 1944) and as an operational airfield for the 417th Bombardment Group (28 January-4 February 1944) which flew A-20 Havocs. Operational squadrons assigned to the airfield were:

- 672d Bombardment Squadron: 28 January-4 February 1944
- 673d Bombardment Squadron: 28 January-4 February 1944
- 674th Bombardment Squadron: 28 January-4 February 1944

In addition, the 547th Night Fighter Squadron flew a night fighter variant of the P-38 Lightning and P-61 Black Widow from the airfield (5 September-6 October 1944).

== See also ==
- USAAF in the Southwest Pacific
