= Kornasoren Airport =

Kornasoren Airport Numfor Airport
- IATA: FOO; ICAO: WABF

Summary
- Airport type: Public
- Operator: DGCA
- Location: Numfor, Biak Numfor Regency, Papua, Indonesia
- Elevation AMSL: 10 ft (3.0 m)
- Coordinates: 00°56′11.00″S 134°52′19.00″E

Map
- Location in Papua Location in Indonesia

Runways
| Direction | Length | | Surface |
| Direction | ft | m | Surface |
|---|---|---|---|
| 03/21 | 5,757 | 1,755 | Asphalt |
- Source: World Aero Data

Kornasoren (Numfor) Airport is a civil airport in Numfor, Biak Islands, Papua, Indonesia. (IATA: FOO). Commercial service is provided by Susi Air to Manokwari and Biak from this Airport.

== History ==
The airfield was one of three constructed by the Japanese during their occupation of the island in 1943/1944. The US Army 158th Regimental Combat Team landed on the beach and encountered stiff resistance. The 503rd Parachute Infantry Regiment parachuted on Kamiri Airifled on 3 July 1944. The Japanese garrison was largely defeated after a suicidal counter-attack by the Japanese on July 5. The island was finally secured after a month of hard fighting on 31 August 1944.

The three airfields on Numfor (Kamiri, Namber, and Yebrurro) were used by the American forces after liberating the island. All three were first repaired and upgraded by the Seabees of the 95th U.S. Naval Construction Battalion.

Kamiri (00°56′49.77″S 134°49′29.23″E) is located along the northwest shoreline of the island and was used by the Royal Australian Air Force (RAAF) until July 1945 when it was abandoned. It has been disused since the end of the war.

Namber (01°04′21.72″S 134°49′51.57″E) is located along the southwest shoreline and was improved and used by American forces, then also abandoned after the end of the war.

Yebrurro Airfield was also used by the Americans and remained in service until the end of the war. It is still in use today as Kornasoren Airport.

=== Allied units stationed on Noemfoor ===
- 309th Bombardment Wing (28 July-9 November 1944)
- 417th Bombardment Group (9 September-6 December 1944)
- 58th Fighter Group (30 August 1944 – 3 April 1944)
- 348th Fighter Group (26 August 1944 – 16 November 1944)
- RAAF 75 Squadron (P-40) 22 July 1944
- RAAF 76 Squadron (P-40) July 1944
- RAAF 80 Squadron (P-40) November 1944
- RAAF 22 Squadron (A-20) August 1944
- RAAF 30 Squadron (Beaufighter) September 1944
- RAAF 37 Squadron (Loadstar) August 1944

== Airlines and destinations ==
| Airlines | Destinations |
|---|---|
| Susi Air | Biak, Manokwari, Ransiki |

== See also ==
- USAAF in the Southwest Pacific
