= Saidor Airport =

Airport in Saidor, Madang, Papua New Guinea

- IATA: SDI; ICAO: AYSD; LID: SDR

Summary
- Airport type: Public
- Location: Saidor, Papua New Guinea
- Elevation AMSL: 75 ft (23 m)
- Coordinates: 05°37′42.92″S 146°27′54.29″E

Map
- Location within Papua New Guinea

Runways
Direction	Length		Surface
Direction	ft	m	Surface
12/30	3,805	1,160	Grass
- Source: World Aero Data

Saidor Airport is an airport in Madang Province, Papua New Guinea. (IATA: SDI, ICAO: AYSD). It is a general aviation airport located at the coast near Saidor, near Saul Point with Dekys Bay to the east and the Bismarck Sea to the north.

== History ==
A pre-World War II airfield, after the US Army landing at Saidor on 2 January 1944 to liberate the area from the Japanese, construction of a single runway running roughly ESE to WNW began. Initially, the airfield was only usable by light Liaison planes, later it was expanded to include extensive taxiways and revetments on the north and south side of the runway, and an apron at each edge of the runway.

At the time of construction, Saidor was the most forward airfield for Allied aircraft striking Japanese to the west. Many planes refueled and made emergency landings at the airfield.

=== Major USAAF units assigned ===
- 309th Bombardment Wing (1 March – 28 July 1944) (Headquarters)
- 417th Bombardment Group (8 February – 9 September 1944)

Headquarters, 672d, 673d, 674th, 675th BS A-20 Havoc

- 58th Fighter Group (3 April – 30 August 1944)

Headquarters, 69th, 310th, 311th FS, P-47 Thunderbolt

- 348th Fighter Group (29 March – 22 May 1944)

Headquarters, 340th FS, 341st FS, 342nd FS, P-47 Thunderbolt

- 82d Tactical Reconnaissance Squadron (71st Reconnaissance Group), (5 April – 27 June 1944), P-39 Airacobra

== See also ==
- USAAF in the Southwest Pacific
