= San Jose Airport (Mindoro) =

Airport serving San Jose, Occidental Mindoro, Philippines

San Jose Airport Paliparan ng San Jose
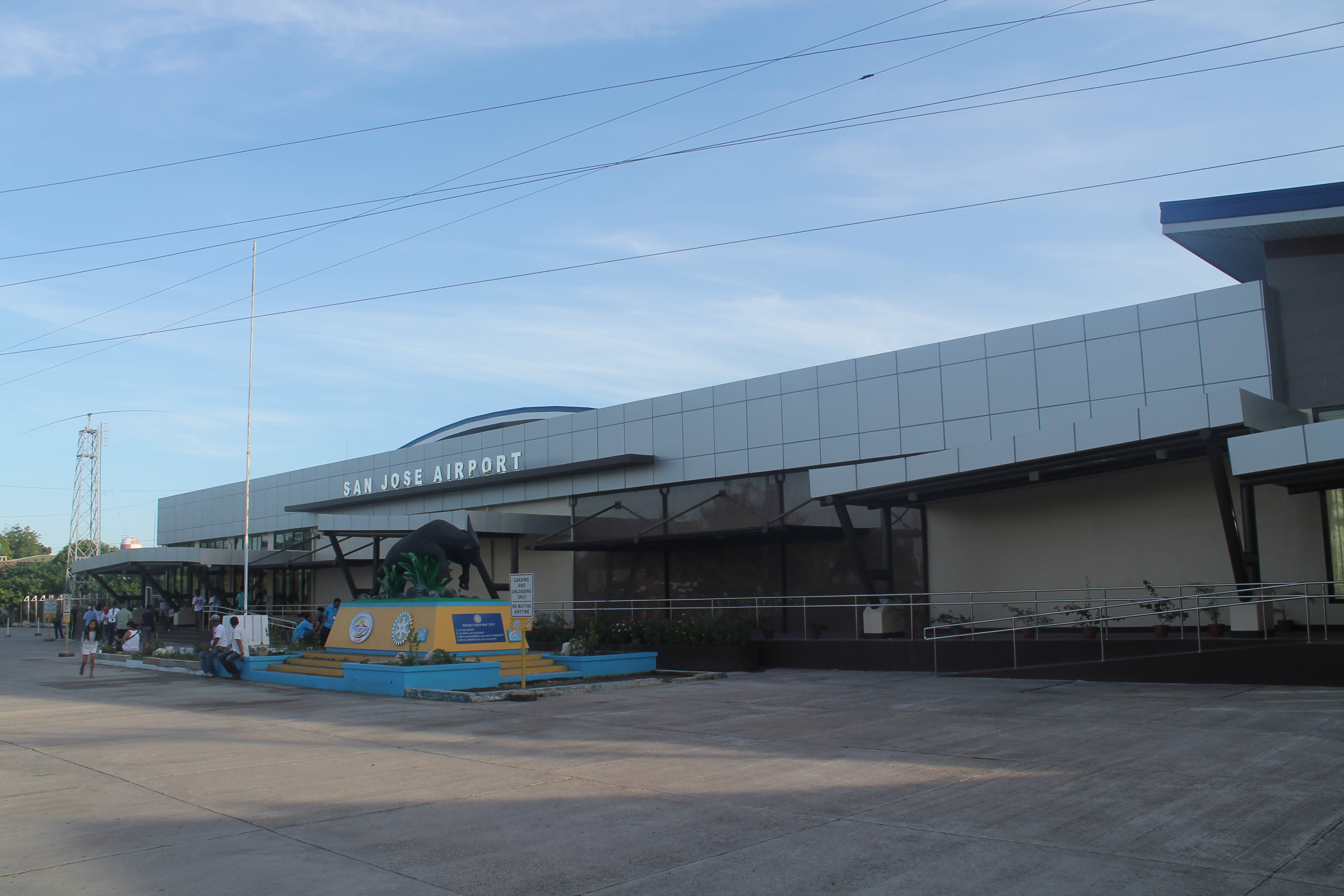
- IATA: SJI; ICAO: RPUH; WMO: 98531

Summary
- Airport type: Public
- Owner/Operator: Civil Aviation Authority of the Philippines
- Serves: San Jose
- Opened: 1951; 75 years ago
- Elevation AMSL: 4 m (13 ft)
- Coordinates: 12°21′41″N 121°02′48″E

Map
- Location within Luzon Location within Philippines

Runways
Direction	Length		Surface
Direction	m	ft	Surface
10/28	1,836	6,024	Concrete

Statistics (2018)
- Passengers: 47,838
- Aircraft Movements: 4,531
- Cargo Movements: 38,172
- Source: Statistics from eFOI

San Jose Airport (IATA: SJI, ICAO: RPUH), formerly known as McGuire Field, is an airport serving the general area of San Jose, Occidental Mindoro in the Philippines. It is one of three airports in Occidental Mindoro, the others being Mamburao Airport and Lubang Airport. The airport is classified as a Principal class 1 domestic airport by the Civil Aviation Authority of the Philippines, an agency of the Department of Transportation that is responsible for the operations of not only this airport but also of all other airports in the Philippines, except the major international airports.

== History ==
San Jose Airport was originally an American air facility which operated in the latter years of World War II. The airstrip was formerly named after World War II 5th Air Force ace Major Thomas McGuire. Consolidated B-24 Liberators were stationed in the facility.

After the war, the air facility was abandoned by American forces, the national government renovated the air facility and was inaugurated years later in 1951 by then President Elpidio Quirino. The national government later built a concrete road from the town center to the airport as well as converted the wooden bridge over the Pandurucan River into a concrete bridge.

The airport underwent a rehabilitation sometime around 2013.

== Facilities ==
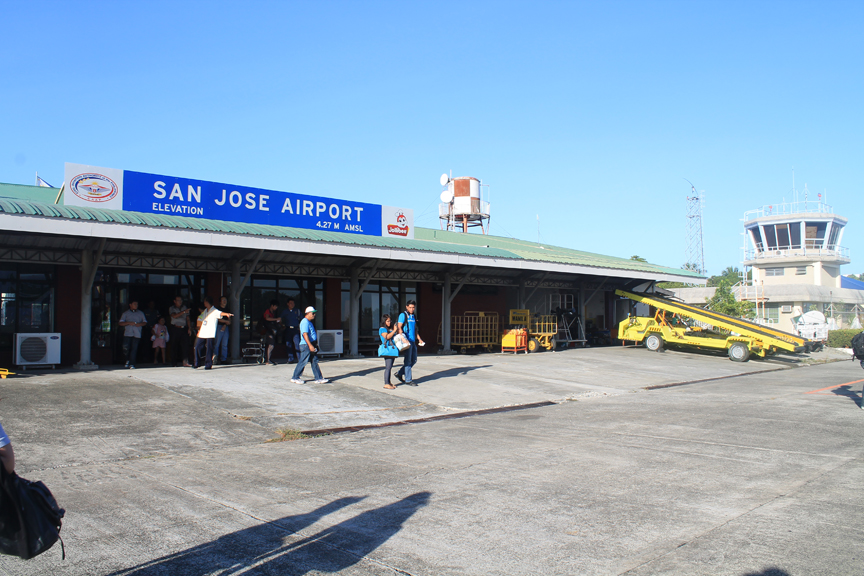
The old passenger terminal of the airport in 2013.

The airport resides at an elevation of 14 feet (4 m) above mean sea level. It has one runway designated 10/28 with a concrete surface measuring 1,836 by 30 metres (6,024 ft × 98 ft). It can accommodate aircraft as large as the Airbus A320.

== Airlines and destinations ==
The airport has no regular commercial flights since Cebgo ended operations to and from the airport on October 24, 2026.

== See also ==
- List of airports in the Philippines
