= Eugene O'Neill (disambiguation) =

Eugene O'Neill may refer to:

- Eugene O'Neill (1888–1953), American playwright
  - Eugene O'Neill Theatre, Broadway theater
  - Eugene O'Neill Theater Center, Connecticut theater
  - Eugene O'Neill Award, Swedish acting award
  - Eugene O'Neill National Historic Site, Danville, California
- Eugene O'Neill Jr. (1910–1950), professor of Greek literature, son of the playwright
- Eugene O'Neill (hurler) (born 1978), Irish hurler
- Eugene M. O'Neill (1850–1926), Irish-born American lawyer and newspaper owner
- Eugene W. O'Neill Jr. (1919–1998), American Air Force officer and flying ace
