= 63rd Fighter Squadron =

US Air Force unit

63d Fighter Squadron

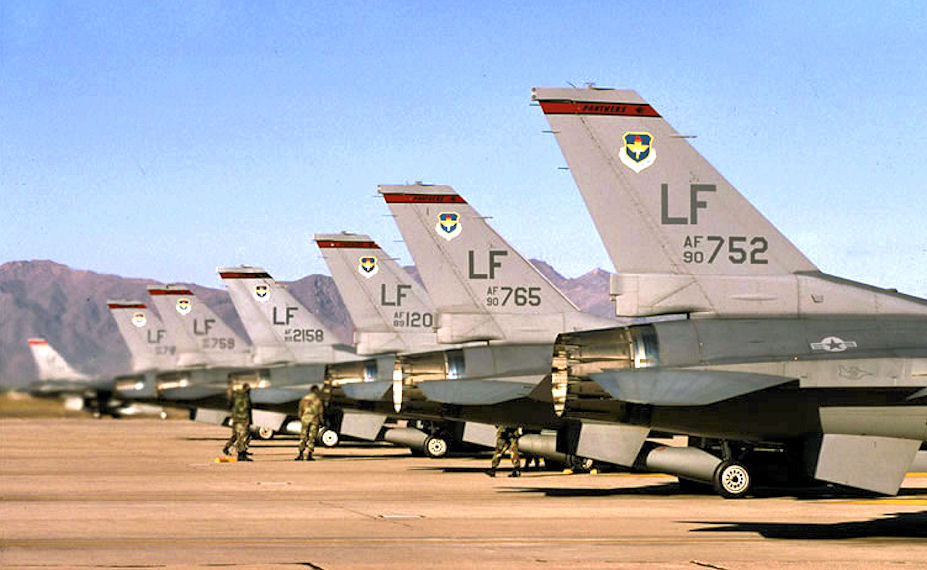
- 63d Fighter Squadron – F-16s on ramp, Luke AFB, Arizona, 2003
- Active: 1941–1945; 1946–1958; 1975–2009; 2016–present
- Country: United States
- Branch: United States Air Force
- Role: Fighter Training
- Part of: Air Combat Command
- Garrison/HQ: Luke Air Force Base
- Nickname: Panthers
- Engagements: Battle of Normandy; Battle of the Bulge
- Decorations: Distinguished Unit Citation; Air Force Outstanding Unit Award

Commanders
- Notable commanders: Major Harold E. Comstock (later Colonel); Major (later Lt General) Gerald W. Johnson; Lieutenant Colonel (later Colonel) John S. Loisel; Major Donavon F. Smith (later Lt General)

Insignia
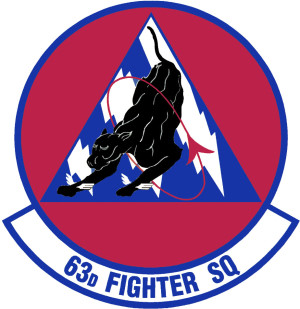
- 63d Fighter Squadron emblem (approved 2 March 1995)

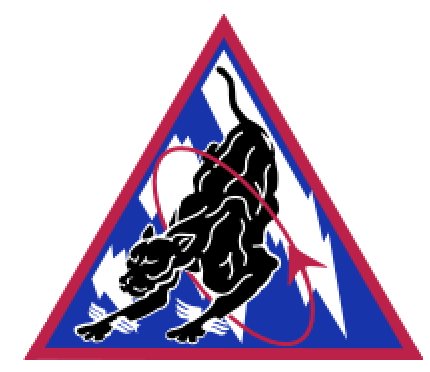
- 63d Fighter-Interceptor Squadron emblem (approved 26 January 1956): (modified 2 March 1995)

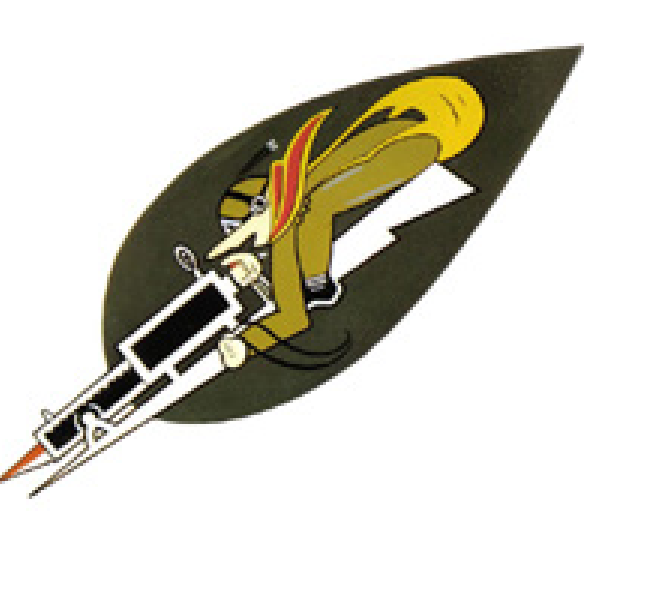
- 63d Fighter Squadron emblem (approved 22 June 1943)

The 63d Fighter Squadron is an active United States Air Force unit, assigned to the 56th Operations Group, at Luke Air Force Base, Arizona. It operates the F-35A aircraft, and conducts advanced fighter training since its reactivation in 2016. When this Squadron was reactivated in 1975, their mission was to train pilots and weapons systems officers for the McDonnell F-4E Phantom II, and they switched to the F-4D in 1978.

== History ==
=== Aircraft Used ===
- Seversky P-35 1941
- Curtis P-36 Hawk 1941
- Curtis P-40 Warhawk 1941–1942
- Republic P-47 Thunderbolt 1942, 1943–1945, and 1946–1947
- North American P-51 Mustang 1946–1947
- Lockheed P (later, F)-80 Shooting Star 1947–1950
- North American F-86 Sabre 1950–1954, 1955–1957
- Northrop F-89 Scorpion 1955–1958
- McDonnell Douglas F-4 Phantom II 1975–1981
- Lockheed F-16 Fighting Falcon 1981–2009
- Lockheed Martin F-35A Lightning II 2017–present

=== World War II ===
see 56th Operations Group for an expanded history of the squadron's World War II history

The squadron was constituted as the 63d Pursuit Squadron one of the three original squadrons of the 56th Pursuit Group at Army Air Base Savannah, Georgia on 15 January 1941. The squadron immediately began training for its wartime missions under III Fighter Command, rapidly transitioning through the Seversky P-35, Curtiss P-36 Hawk, Bell P-39 Airacobra, and Curtiss P-40 Warhawk aircraft. On 7 December 1941, the 63d assumed the mission to defend the Northeastern United States from anticipated enemy air attack while it converted to the Republic P-47 Thunderbolt aircraft and prepared to deploy overseas, operating under the I Fighter Command, New York Fighter Wing in the early months of 1942.

It was redesignated 63d Fighter Squadron on 15 May 1942, and deployed to England on 9 January 1943. It was declared operationally ready two months later and flew its first combat missions 13 April. The squadron was given fuselage code "LM" and operated from several RAF stations during the war, flying the P-47C Thunderbolt as an VIII Fighter Command bomber-escort unit initially for Boeing B-17 Flying Fortresses and beginning in 1944 for Consolidated B-24 Liberators attacking enemy targets in Occupied Europe. Flying escort for fighter sweeps ahead of U.S. bomber fleets, the pilots destroyed 167.5 enemy aircraft in the air and 110 on the ground. After the end of the war in Europe, the squadron was inactivated on 18 October 1945.

=== Strategic Air Command fighter escort ===
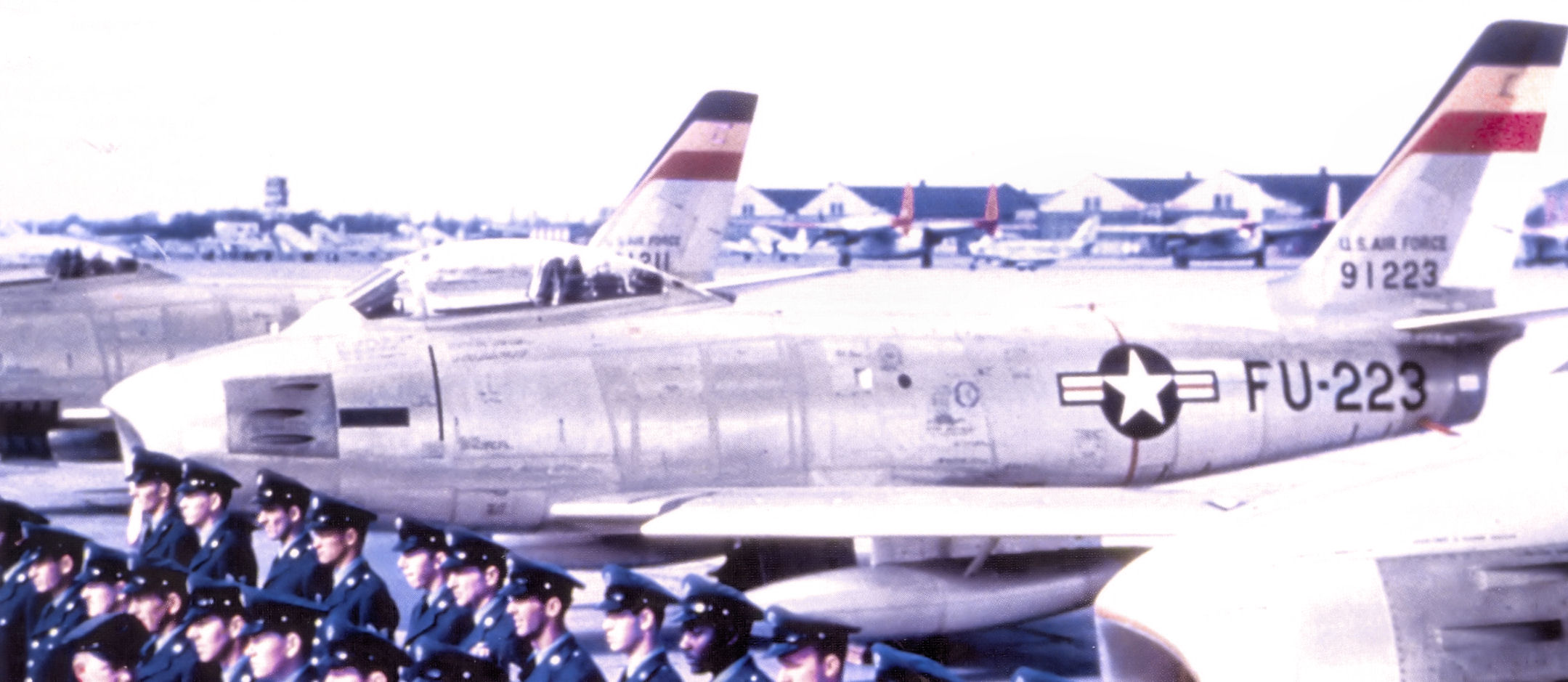
63d Fighter-Interceptor Squadron North American F-86A-5-NA Sabre 49-1223 56th Fighter-Interceptor Group, Selfridge AFB, Michigan, 1950

The squadron was reactivated on 1 May 1946 as a Strategic Air Command (SAC) escort fighter group, being assigned to Fifteenth Air Force at Selfridge Field, Michigan. Initially equipped with the P-47D Thunderbolts, being replaced with long-range North American P-51H Mustangs, originally developed for Twentieth Air Force bomber escort missions in the Pacific Theater. The mission of the squadron was to provide fighter escort of SAC's B-29 Superfortress bombers on intercontinental strategic bombardment missions, deploying to Alaska and Europe in this role. In 1947, the squadron was upgraded to Lockheed P-80C Shooting Stars, as SAC introduced the Boeing B-50 Superfortress in the late 1940s. The squadron trained to maintain proficiency as a mobile strike force, including bomber escort mission until transferred from Strategic Air Command to Continental Air Command (ConAC)on 1 December 1948.

=== Air defense of the midwest ===
The squadron began performing air defense missions upon its transfer to ConAC and relocated to Wurtsmith Air Force Base, Michigan in 1951 and re-equipped with the North American F-86A Sabre. The squadron was redesignated the 63d Fighter-Interceptor Squadron on 20 January 1950. It was assigned to Air Defense Command in December 1950 and the 4708th Defense Wing in February 1952. In 1954, the squadron was re-equipped with the purpose-built Northrop F-89 Scorpion interceptor. In 1957 began re-equipping with the North American F-86L Sabre. Moved to O'Hare International Airport, near Chicago, the squadron maintained the air defense alert at O'Hare until being inactivated in January 1958.

=== Fighter training ===
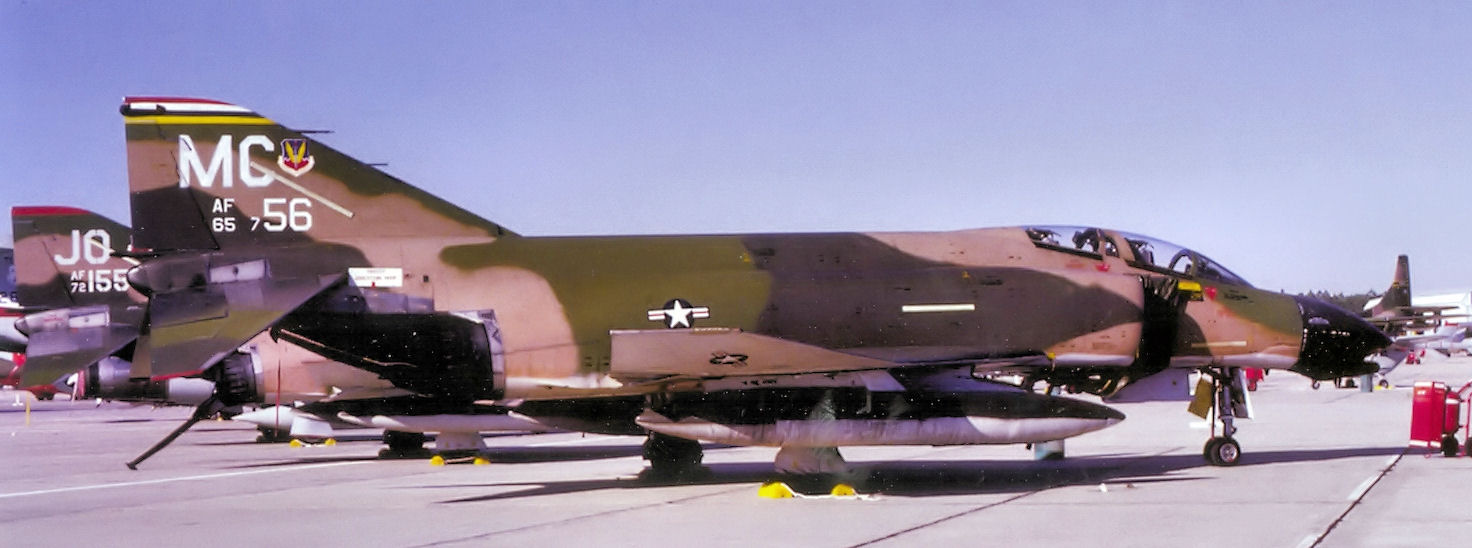
63d TFTS F-4D-28-MC Phantom 65–0756, 1979

The squadron was reactivated 30 June 1975 as the 63d Tactical Fighter Squadron at MacDill Air Force Base, Florida. Its mission was to train pilots and weapons systems officers for the McDonnell F-4E Phantom II. It changed equipment to the F-4D in 1978, sending the "E" models to operational squadrons. General Dynamics F-16A Fighting Falcons started to arrive for the 63d in 1980 and was active with the F-16A and F-16B by 1981. Squadron aircraft carried the "MC" tail code, with a red tail stripe outlined in white. On 1 October 1981, the squadron was re-designated the 63d Tactical Fighter Training Squadron even though it had trained crew when it flew the Phantom II. Starting in 1988, the 63d converted to the F-16C/D block 30.

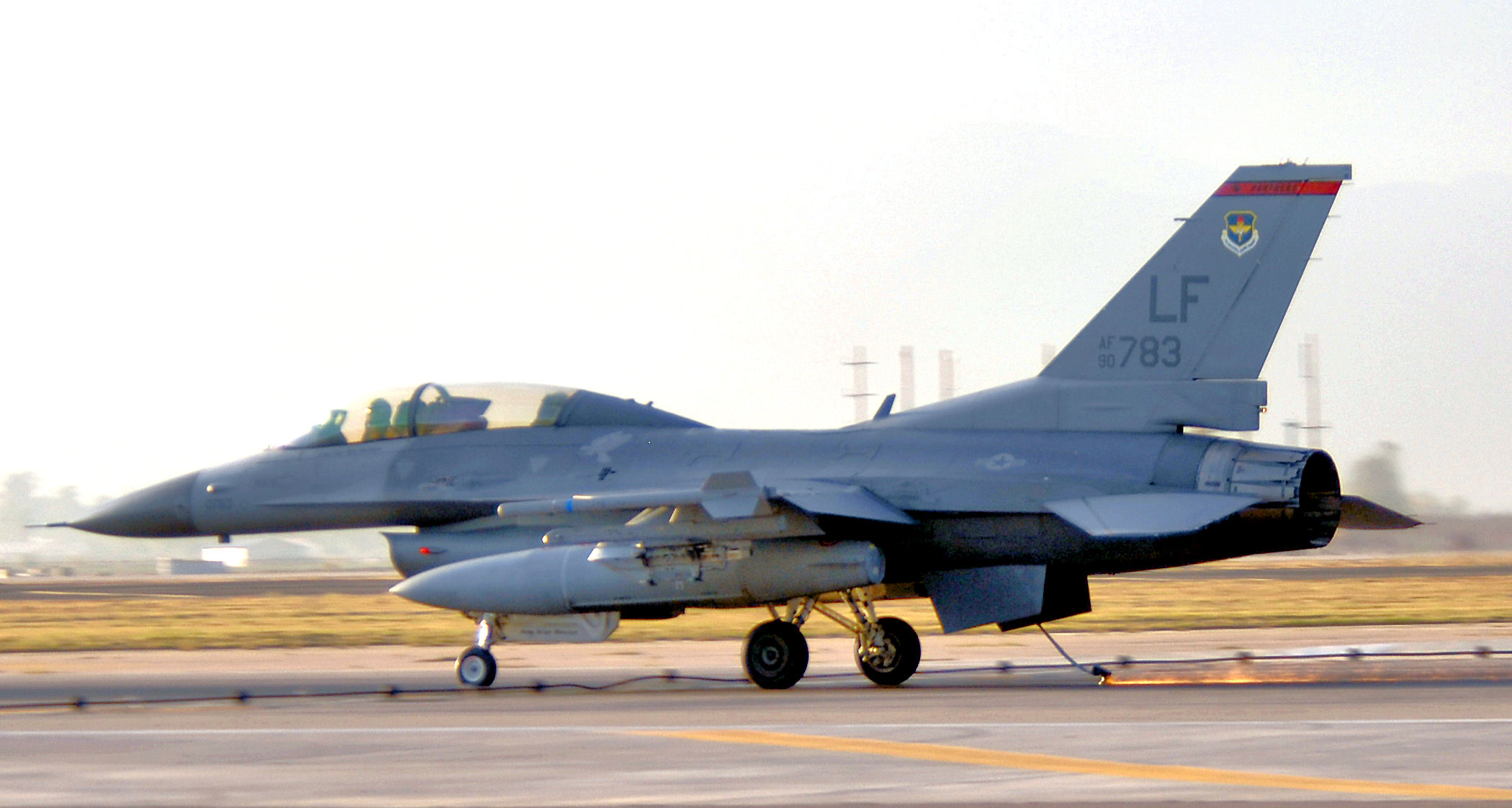
63d FS F-16D Block 42H Fighting Falcon 90-0783

On 1 November 1991, the host 56th Tactical Training Wing at MacDill implemented the Objective Wing organization plan, and the subsequent redesignation of units led to the 63d becoming simply the 63d Fighter Squadron, and being assigned to the 56th Operations Group. The end of the Cold War led to the BRAC commissions, and the downsizing of the Air Force to a smaller organization. As a result, it was decided first to close MacDill, although under political pressure later it was realigned to a new mission.

Like its two sister squadrons, the 61st and 62d Fighter Squadrons, the 63d Fighter Squadron moved to Luke Air Force Base, Arizona, but instead of getting F-16 Block 25s the squadron took over Block 42 F-16Cs. The 63d moved to Luke AFB on 25 February 1993. The move was one of the starts to the process of making Luke the main F-16 Replacement Training Unit location.

On 14 January 2008, the 63d started a course that caught a few aviation headlines. They began training pilots selected to fly the Lockheed Martin F-22 Raptor, pilots who have never flown a fighter before. Up to this point F-22 pilots were hand-picked from the existing fighter community. Once the training in the F-16 was completed, the student pilots were reassigned to the 43d Fighter Squadron at Tyndall Air Force Base, Florida where they spent the next two years training with the F-22.

In February 2008, it was announced that the 63d was to be inactivated as a result of BRAC 2005 that Luke give up twenty-five block 25 F-16s. Although the 63d flew the Block 42 it transferred its F-16s to the 61st Fighter Squadron, which did operate the block 25. The 61st, due to its seniority and historical heritage, would remain active.

On 4 April 2009, the 63d graduated its last class of F-16 pilots at which time it continued the process to inactivate. Officially the squadron stood down on 22 May 2009 after 68 years of service.

The squadron was reactivated on 1 August 2016 under the command of Lieutenant Colonel Matthew Vedder to train Lockheed Martin F-35 Lightning II pilots as part of a joint effort between Turkey and the United States.

== Lineage ==
- Constituted as the 63d Pursuit Squadron (Interceptor) on 20 November 1940

Activated on 15 January 1941
Redesignated 63d Pursuit Squadron (Interceptor) (Twin Engine) on 31 January 1942
Redesignated 63d Fighter Squadron (Twin Engine) on 15 May 1942
Redesignated 63d Fighter Squadron on 1 June 1942
Redesignated 63d Fighter Squadron, Single Engine on 28 February 1944
Inactivated on 18 October 1945

- Activated on 1 May 1946

Redesignated 63d Fighter Squadron, Jet Propelled on 24 April 1947
Redesignated 63d Fighter Squadron, Jet on 14 June 1948
Redesignated 63d Fighter-Interceptor Squadron on 20 January 1950
Inactivated on 8 January 1958

- Redesignated 63d Tactical Fighter Squadron on 12 May 1975

Activated on 30 June 1975
Redesignated 63d Tactical Fighter Training Squadron on 1 October 1981
Redesignated 63d Fighter Squadron on 1 November 1991
Inactivated on 22 May 2009
Activated on 1 August 2016

=== Assignments ===
- 56th Pursuit Group (later 56th Fighter Group), 15 January 1941 – 18 October 1945
- 56th Fighter Group (later 56th Fighter-Interceptor Group), 1 May 1946
- 4708th Defense Wing, 6 February 1952
- 4706th Defense Wing, 1 July 1952
- 527th Air Defense Group, 16 February 1953
- 56th Fighter Group, 18 August 1955 – 8 January 1958
- 56th Tactical Fighter Wing (later 56th Tactical Training Wing, 56th Fighter Wing), 30 June 1975
- 56th Operations Group, 1 November 1991
- 58th Operations Group, 25 February 1993
- 56th Operations Group, 1 April 1994 – 22 May 2009
- 56th Operations Group, 1 August 2016 – present
