= 56th Operations Group =

US Air Force unit

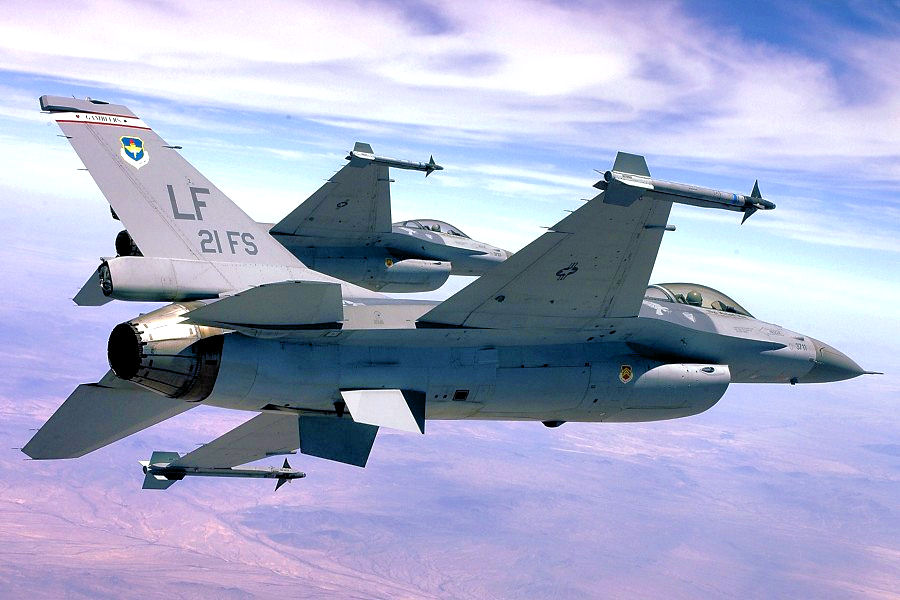
- 21st Fighter Squadron F-16A
- Active: 1941–1945, 1946–1952, 1955–1961, 1991–present
- Country: United States
- Branch: United States Air Force
- Type: Training wing operations group
- Role: Fighter crew training
- Size: 4 F-35 Lightning II squadrons and 1 F-16 Fighting Falcon squadron 1 Air Control Squadron; 1 operations support squadron 120 F-35 aircraft and 26 F-16 aircraft 200 instructor pilots
- Part of: 56th Fighter Wing; Fifteenth Air Force
- Garrison/HQ: Luke Air Force Base, Arizona
- Motto: Cave Tonitrum Latin Beware the Thunderbolt
- Engagements: 447 group missions
- Decorations: Distinguished Unit Citation; Air Force Outstanding Unit Award

Commanders
- Current commander: Col. Oliver R. Lause

Insignia
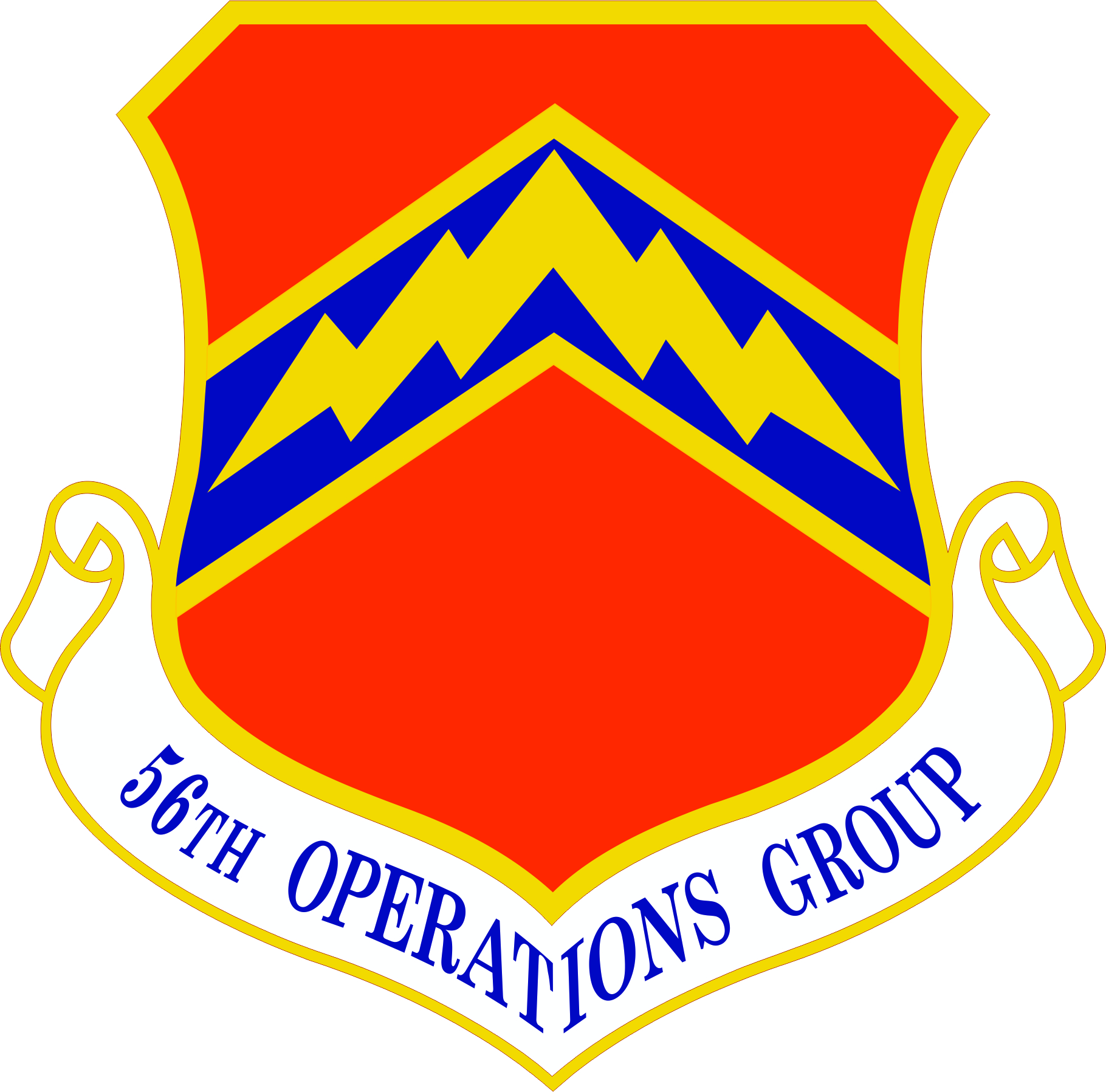
- 56th Operations Gp emblem (Note: The group uses the 56th Fighter Wing emblem with the group designation on the scroll. Robertson, Factsheet 56 Operations Group.)

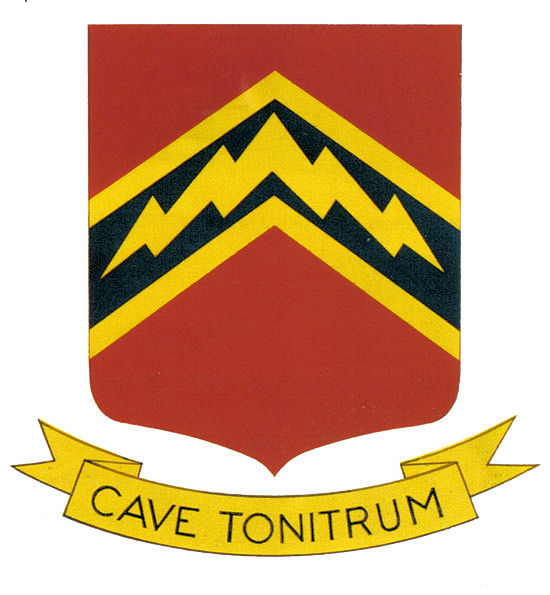
- 56th Fighter Group emblem (approved 4 April 1942)

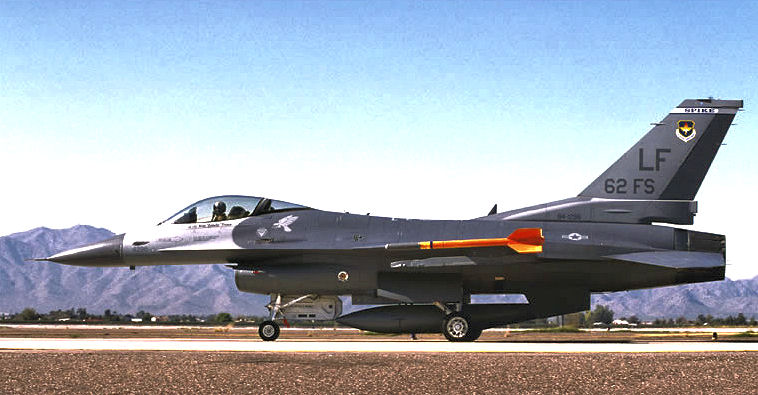
F-16 of the 62d Fighter Squadron ready for takeoff at Luke

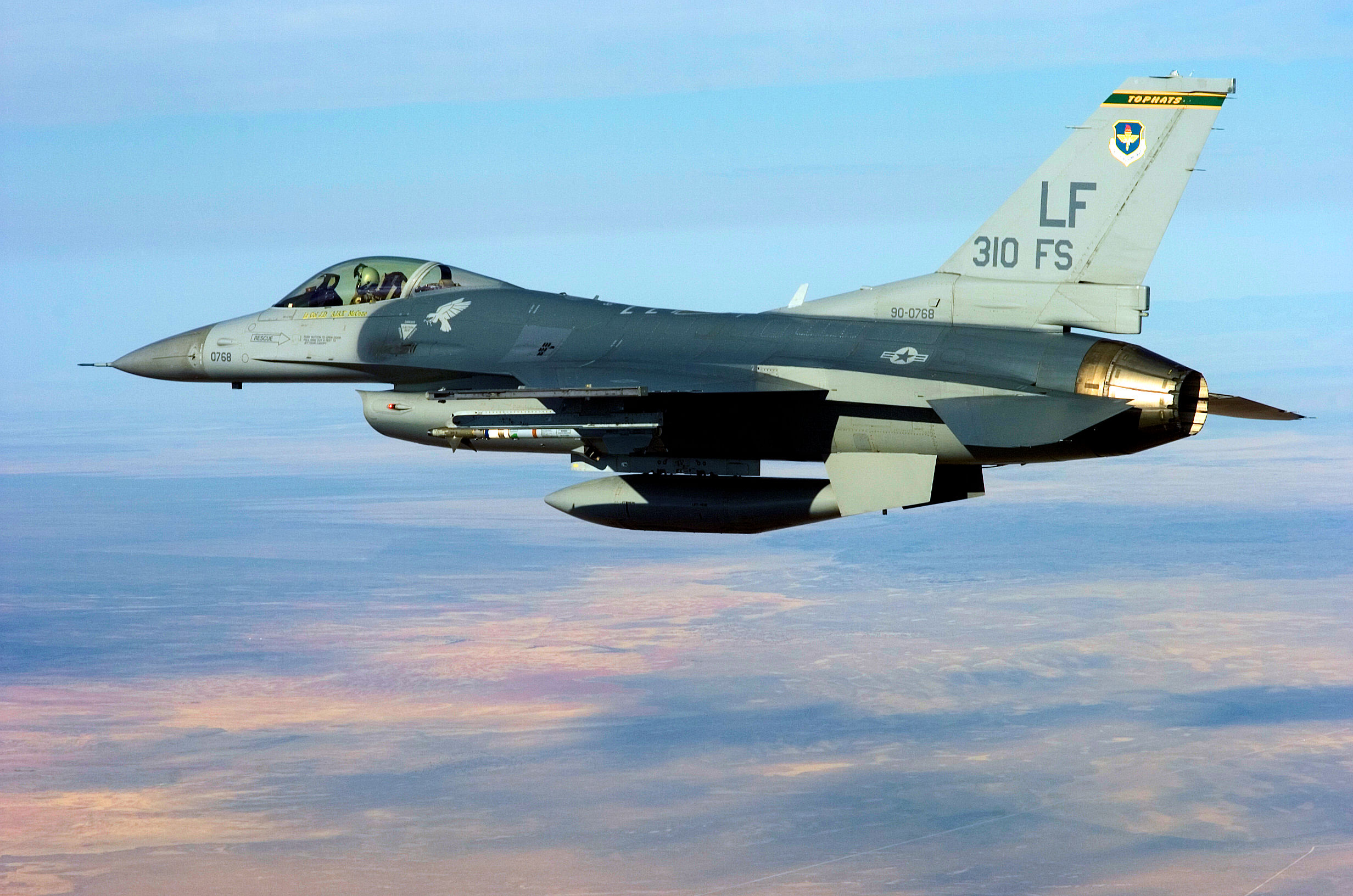
F-16C Block 42J Fighting Falcon 90-0768 flies over the White Sands Missile Range in New Mexico during a QF-4 drone chase.

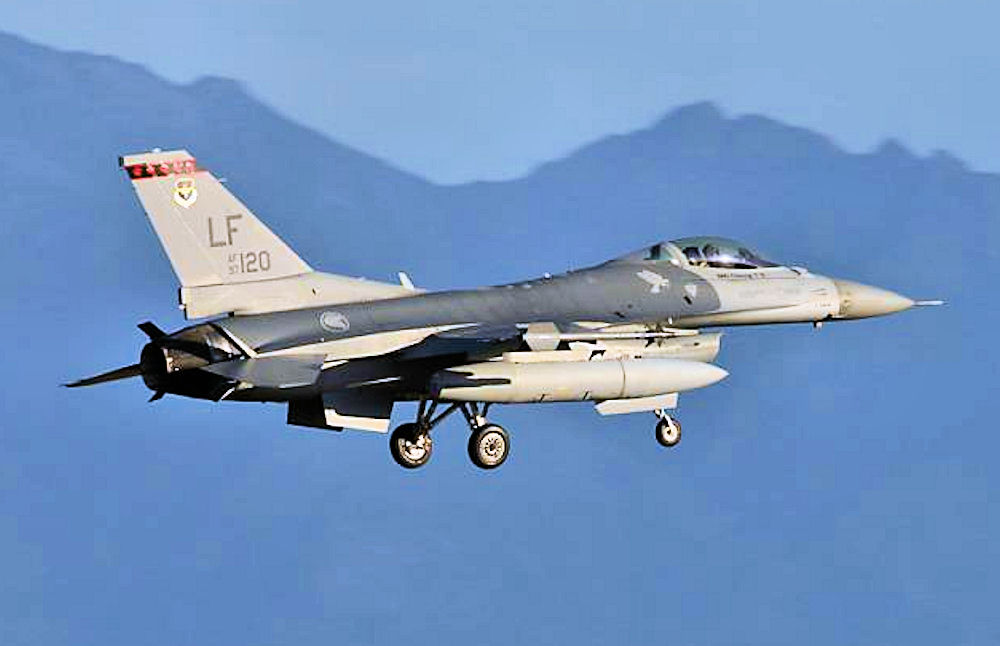
425th FS F-16CJ Block 52 Fighting Falcon 97–120

The 56th Operations Group is a unit of the United States Air Force, and the flying component of the 56th Fighter Wing.

The group is the direct descendant of the World War II 56th Fighter Group of the United States Army Air Forces. The 56th Fighter Group is credited by the Air Force Historical Research Agency with the destruction of 665.5 aircraft in air-to-air combat, the 56th Fighter Group had more air-to-air kills than any other fighter group in the Eighth Air Force, was the top-scoring Republic P-47 Thunderbolt group during World War II, and recorded the second-highest number of air-to-air kills of any USAAF fighter group. The 56th also claimed 311 fighters destroyed on the ground.

== Overview ==
The 56th Operations Group is the second largest Operations Group in the United States Air Force with 13 separate reporting organizations (second only to the 55th Operations Group in Offutt Air Force Base, NE).

In fiscal year 2006, the 56th Operations Group flew 37,000 sorties and 50,000 hours while graduating 484 F-16 students. With huge spaces in the western Arizona desert and clear weather skies for most of the year, Luke AFB and its ranges have been an important training asset for the United States Air Force for many years. This is likely to remain the case for the foreseeable future.

Aircraft assigned to the 56 OG are tail coded "LF", for "Luke Field."

== Mission ==
The mission of the 56 OG is to train Air Battle Managers, command and control operators, F-16 Fighting Falcon and F-35A Lightning II fighter pilots.

== Components ==
- 56th Operations Support Squadron, a non-flying squadron, the 56 OSS controls all airfield activities at Luke.
- 56th Training Squadron, a non-flying squadron, the 56 TS provides academic, simulator, and live-mission ground training in support of the F-16 and F-35 training mission.
- 61st Fighter Squadron, ("Top Dogs"), the first fighter squadron to receive F-35A Lightning II aircraft at Luke AFB, Arizona. The 61 FS currently operates F-35A Lightning IIs for aircrew training of USAF pilots since its reactivation 2014.
- 62d Fighter Squadron, ("Spikes"), flies the F-35A Lightning II aircraft to conduct the formal training unit mission.
- 63d Fighter Squadron, ("Panthers") reactivated in August 2016 as F-35A training unit.
- 308th Fighter Squadron, ("Emerald Knights", Tailband: Green & White (checkerboard)), wears the dark green and white checkerboard fin band. The 308 FS currently operates F-35A Lightning IIs for pilot training for the Royal Netherlands Air Force's and the Royal Danish Air Force's pilots since its reactivation 2018.
- 309th Fighter Squadron, ("Wild Ducks", Tailband: Blue & White), flies F-16C and F-16D aircraft drawn from production Blocks 25 and 42 conducting F-16 crew training for active duty USAF pilots.
- 310th Fighter Squadron, ("Top Hats", Tailband: Green & Yellow), reactivated in June 2023 as F-35A training unit.
- 312th Fighter Squadron, reactivated in June 2023 as F-35A training unit.
- 425th Fighter Squadron, ("Black Widows", Tailband: Red & Black), wear a red/black fin band and are unique in USAF assigned combat aircraft as they also wear the Lions head insignia of the Singapore Air Force in place of the USAF 'star and bar'.
- 550th Fighter Squadron, ("Silver Eagles") flies F-15C/D aircraft as a Total Force Integration unit collocated with the 173d Fighter Wing (ANG).
- 607th Air Control Squadron, ("Venom"), operates the Control and Reporting center which consists of the AN/TYQ-23A(v1) tactical air operations module, AN/TPS-75 mobile ground radar, AN/TSQ-147 JTIDS Module, and the AN/TRC-215 remote radio suite. This squadron trains all ground C2 operators to provide multi-domain command and control for 14 Air Control Squadrons.

== History ==
For additional history, see 56th Fighter Wing

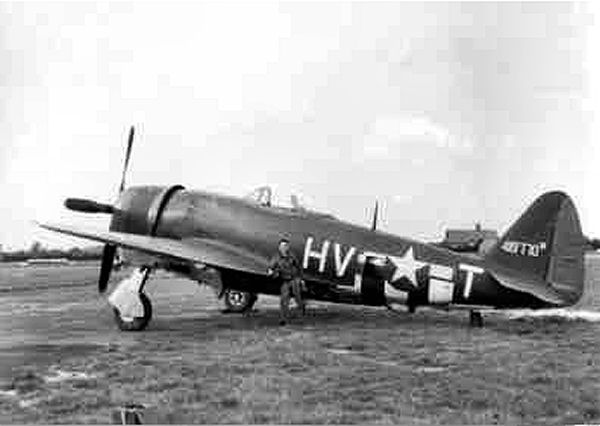
P-47D 44-19770, 61st Fighter Squadron, 56th FG, pilot Arthur Joseph Bux Jr.

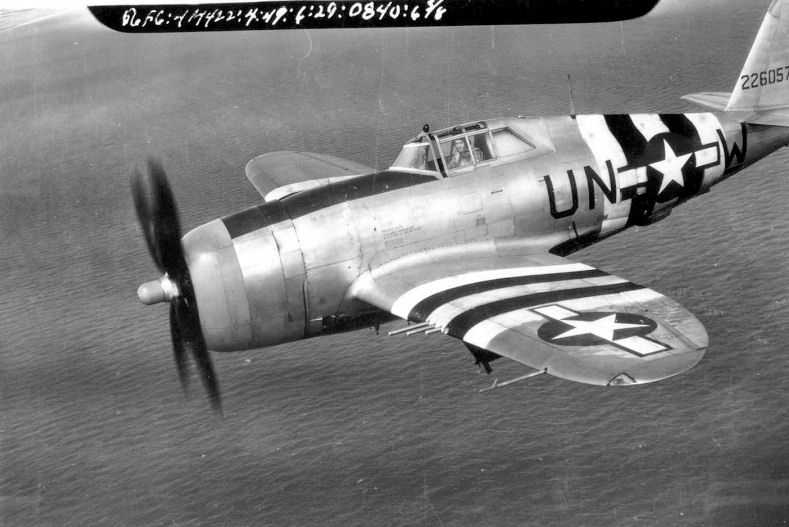
Republic P-47D-22-RE Thunderbolt 42-26057 of the 63d Fighter Squadron in D-Day invasion markings, 1944. Pilot 2nd Lt. Elwood D. Raymond, KIA on September 18th, 1944 by flak and crashed in North Sea.

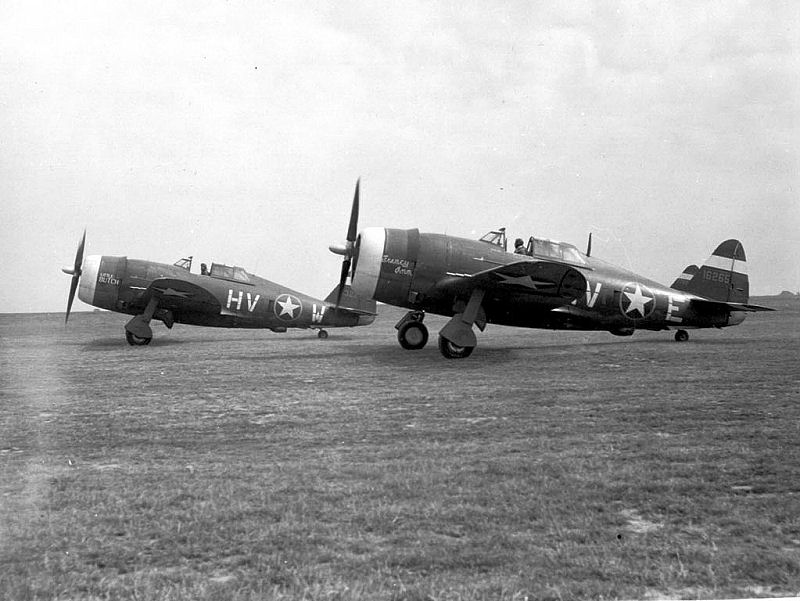
Republic P-47C-2-RE Thunderbolts of the 61st Fighter Squadron, 1942. Note the early USAAF fuselage insignia.

(Except where noted, this material prior to 1958 is extracted from Maurer, Maurer, ed. (1983) [1961]. Air Force Combat Units of World War II (PDF) (reprint ed.). Washington, DC: Office of Air Force History. ISBN 0-912799-02-1. ).

=== Origins ===
The group was activated as the 56th Pursuit Group on 15 January 1941 at the Savannah Army Air Base in Georgia. Expansion of the group began after the move to Charlotte Army Air Base, North Carolina in May 1941 when they were equipped with a small number of Bell P-39 Airacobra and Curtiss P-40 Warhawk aircraft. Intensive training at Charleston Municipal Airport, South Carolina in Dec 1941 and from January to June 1942 at airfields in New York, at area headquarters at Mitchel Field. Here they flew on air defense patrols. Selected to train with the new Republic P-47B Thunderbolt, they received the first aircraft in June 1942. The group then moved to Bridgeport Municipal Airport, Connecticut on 7 July 1942 and continued testing and training with early P-47s. Alerted for overseas duty in December 1942 they sailed on the RMS Queen Elizabeth on 6 January 1943 and arrived in Gourock on 11 January 1943.The 56th PG was assigned three fighter squadrons:

- 61st Pursuit Squadron
- 62d Pursuit Squadron
- 63d Pursuit Squadron

Staffed by a cadre drawn from other units at nearby Hunter AAB the 56th PG organized as a combat unit with a high turnover in personnel. On 26 May 1941, the group relocated to Morris Field, Charlotte, North Carolina, where it received 3 P-39s and 10 Curtiss P-36 Hawks, and trained, participated in training maneuvers, served as an air defense organization, and functioned as an operational training unit (OTU). During maneuvers in October 1941 it received 10 new P-39s and performed well in an air defense role.

=== World War II ===
On 10 December 1941, in the immediate aftermath of the Japanese attack on Pearl Harbor, the 56th PG moved to Wilmington Army Air Base, North Carolina for air defense duties, with its 61st PS based at Charleston AAB, South Carolina. It received 24 newly commissioned 2nd lieutenant pilots in December and set up a makeshift assessment school using five types of obsolete fighter aircraft, including P-35s and P-43s.

In mid-January 1942 the 56th PG shifted to air defense of New York City, with its headquarters at Bendix AAF, New Jersey, and its squadrons assigned respectively to Bridgeport, Connecticut; Bendix; and Farmingdale, New York. In April 1942 it received a full complement of new P-40F Warhawks to replace its makeshift equipment.

In May 1942 it was redesignated the 56th Fighter Group and its component squadrons were redesignated as fighter squadrons. The 56th FG received its first operational P-47B's from nearby Republic Aviation in June, in which it began training for combat. One of its most notable pilots, Major Robert S. Johnson, noted that during this "break-in" phase, in addition to numerous non-fatal training accidents 18 pilots of the 56th FG were killed and 41 aircraft destroyed in crashes, many as a result of the wholly inadequate airfield at nearby Stratford, on Long Island Sound. Group headquarters shifted to Bridgeport in July, joined by the 63rd FS in September, and the 62nd FS received its P-47s in July at Bradley Field, Connecticut.

Four fighter groups sent to England in the summer of 1942 as part of the Bolero buildup were transferred to the Twelfth Air Force to support the invasion of North Africa, leaving the U.S. VIII Fighter Command with a single fighter group. To rebuild the fighter forces, the 56th FG was assigned for overseas duty in England. Major Hubert A. Zemke, a pre-war Air Corps pilot with experience as a combat observer with the RAF and a P-40 instructor to the Soviet Air Force, became group commander on 16 September 1942. The 56th FG was alerted for overseas deployment on Thanksgiving Day, ceased all air operations, and moved to Camp Kilmer, New Jersey, on 28 December.

The 56th Fighter Group sailed from New York on the RMS Queen Elizabeth on 6 January 1943. Arriving at Gourock, Scotland, on 11 January, the personnel of the 56th FG moved by train to their first station at RAF Kings Cliffe in Cambridgeshire to await arrival of new P-47C's in late January. Shortly after its arrival in the UK, the 61st Fighter Squadron received a new pilot, Captain Francis S. Gabreski who had been seconded to No. 315 Squadron RAF, a fighter squadron of Polish Air Force pilots, to acquire combat experience. Bad weather prevented the group from flying its new aircraft until 10 February.

The 56th was one of three P-47 groups in England, and the only one to previously train on the Thunderbolt. The 4th Fighter Group at RAF Debden had been created the preceding September by incorporating the veteran RAF Eagle squadrons into the USAAF, and the newly arrived 78th Fighter Group at RAF Goxhill had previously flown P-38 Lightnings. Consequently, the 56th was the only group of the three to have confidence in their aircraft despite problems of compressibility in dives, and performance teething problems that included poor rate of climb, poor acceleration, numerous engine seizures due to oil counterbalance seal failures, ignition system problems, radio interference, and lack of spare parts.

At the end of three months of breaking in new equipment, trouble-shooting performance problems with their new airplanes, and training in the British tactics and procedures adopted by the VIII Fighter Command, the group moved to a new base at RAF Horsham St. Faith on 6 April 1943, which had been a pre-war permanent RAF station. The 56th received ground support there from the attached 33d Service Group, commanded by Lt. Col. Douglas Pollard, and the 41st Service Squadron.

==== Camouflage, unit markings, and radio call signs ====
The three component squadrons, the 61st, 62d, and 63d Fighter Squadrons, flew P-47C (blocks 2 and 5) from February 1943 to April 1943, P-47D (blocks 1 through 30) from June 1943 to March 1945, and P-47Ms from January 1945 to 10 October 1945. All 130 P-47M models served with the 56th FG before it redeployed from the UK.

The P-47C and P-47D aircraft received by the 56th FG were finished in factory-applied olive drab (OD) with gray lower surfaces. Because the P-47 was the only radial engined allied fighter, the danger of other allied fighters mistaking it for the Fw 190 caused VIII Fighter Command to have 24-inch (610 mm) white cowl bands painted on the noses of P-47s after March 1943. Other rapid identification measures used were white banding on both the tail fin and horizontal stabilizers, and the use of oversized USAAF roundels on the undersides of both wings.

The USAAF ended the factory-applied camouflage on all aircraft produced after 13 February 1944, and the first unpainted block 21 "razorback" canopy and block 25 "bubble-top" canopy models arrived in May. The first "silver" aircraft, 42-26044, was left uncamouflaged, given the name Silver Lady, and flown in combat by Capt. James Carter and Major Les Smith of the 61st FS. The first bubbletops, dubbed "Superbolts", were assigned to the group and squadron commanders until more became available.

The 56th applied field camouflage to most but not all of these replacement fighters. Most bubbletops were given an RAF-style "shadow-shading" (disruptive) pattern of "RAF green" (a shade similar to olive drab) overlaid on light sea gray (another RAF shade) on upper surfaces, while most razorbacks were field-painted in overall dark OD on upper and light gray on lower surfaces. Shadow shading, however, appeared in a variety of schemes and colors, adding to the distinction of the group's aircraft.

When P-47M's appeared in January 1945, each squadron adopted an individual camouflage scheme on upper surfaces while lower surfaces of the fighters were left unpainted. The 61st used a matte black color that faded to a dark purple. The 62d continued the green-and-gray shadow-shading pattern, while the 63d went to a shadow-shading pattern of "deep Mediterranean blue" (indigo) applied over sky blue.

VIII Fighter Command assigned the 56th Fighter Group two-letter squadron identification codes to be painted on the fuselages of its fighters, and each squadron assigned its aircraft individual letter identifiers. (The letters chosen for the 56th had previously been assigned to the 1st Fighter Group before it went to the Twelfth Air Force.) In early February 1944 the 56th replaced its white cowl bands with a different color for each squadron. This innovation lasted until mid-March, when VIII Fighter Command adopted a color system for all Eighth Air Force fighter groups. The 56th painted its noses red and later applied the squadron colors to the tail rudders of its Thunderbolts, an innovation that VIII Fighter Command also borrowed. The 56th discontinued use of squadron colors when it changed to P-47M's.

On 23 April 1944, VIII Fighter Command changed its system of radio call signs to reduce confusion when the fighter groups, now numbering a hundred or more fighters in their inventories, deployed two groups on escort missions ("A group" and "B Group"). Station call signs (RAF Halesworth's was STURDY, and RAF Boxted's DOGDAY) were unchanged, but all previous call signs were discontinued. In 1945 provision was also made for a C Group on missions (usually only 8 to 12 fighters) and all fighters assigned to a C Group mission used the common call sign.

Operations Identification Data

	61st Fighter Sqdn	62d Fighter Sqdn	63d Fighter Sqdn	
Squadron Code	HV	LM	UN	
Squadron color	red	yellow	light blue	
Radio call signs	61st FS	62d FS	63d FS	Group
prior to 23 April 1944, A Group	KEYWORTH	WOODFIRE	POSTGATE	YARDSTICK
B Group	HALSTED	GROUNDHOG	NORTHGROVE	ASHLAND
after 23 April 1944, A Group	Whippet	Platform	Daily	Fairbank
B Group	Household	Icejug	Yorker	Subway
C Group	--	--	--	Pantile

Like all Allied aircraft flying over the continent, the 56th applied alternating 18-inch (460 mm) black and white bands, known as "invasion stripes", to the rear fuselage and wings of its fighters just prior to D-Day. It retained the lower wing stripes and lower portion of the rear fuselage until the end of 1944, when most invasion stripes were deleted.

==== Combat operations and tactics ====
===== 1943 =====
P-47s of VIII Fighter Command performed three types of missions during 1943, all normally in group strength of 40–48 fighters, based on similar operations used by the Royal Air Force:

- Circus – a heavy escort of a small group of bombers as a diversionary tactic to draw German fighter reaction away from the main strike,
- Rodeo – large-scale fighter sweeps through areas of German fighter reaction, to provoke an engagement, and
- Ramrod – bomber support (escort) of heavy bomber strikes, either during penetration or withdrawal of the bomber force.

The 56th FG sent its four most experienced pilots to Debden in early April 1943 to gain experience before the group's first mission, which occurred 13 April 1943. Its first combat and casualties occurred 29 April, when Capt. John E. McClure and 1st Lt. Winston W. "Bill" Garth of the 62nd FS became POWs. The 56th flew 24 missions and 900 sorties (almost entirely Rodeo fighter sweeps and Circus diversions) in April and May, losing a total of 3 aircraft to enemy action. Its first Ramrod bomber escort mission occurred 13 May, to Saint-Omer, France.

In June the group staged out of a forward base at RAF Manston, Kent, to extend its range and registered its first victories over the Luftwaffe, shooting down four fighters on sweeps along the coast of France and Belgium on the 12th and 13th. On 26 June, providing withdrawal support for a late afternoon bomber mission to Villacoublay airfield, it fought a 20-minute battle with veteran Fw 190 pilots of III/JG 26 over Forges-les-Eaux, France. The result was a major setback, with five Thunderbolts destroyed, four pilots killed, and only two German fighters shot down.

In July the 56th FG was moved from its comfortable quarters at Horsham St. Faith to a much-less improved installation at RAF Halesworth, along the coast of Suffolk, both to be nearer to German-occupied territory and to allow Horsham St. Faith to be completed as a heavy bomber base. On 12 August it used partially filled and unpressurized 200-gallon ferry tanks as jettisonable fuel tanks for the first time in combat, escorting bombers headed for Bonn, Germany. In its first four months of missions, the 56th Group shot down 9 aircraft and lost 10.

The 56th provided penetration support on 17 August 1943, for B-17s of the 4th Bomb Wing headed for Regensburg in the morning, returned to base to re-arm and re-fuel, and flew withdrawal support for the 1st Bomb Wing returning from Schweinfurt in the late afternoon. It scored its first major victory, penetrating fifteen miles (24 km) into Germany to break up frontal attacks on the bombers. The 56th used tactics it called "dive, fire, and recover", attacking German fighters from a higher altitude, taking advantage of its tremendous diving speed, then zooming back to gain altitude advantage. In a running twenty-minute battle across Belgium, the 56th claimed 17 German fighters shot down (mainly of JG 3 and JG 26) for a loss of three P-47s and pilots. Three of those kills were made by Capt. Gerald W. Johnson of the 61st FS, who two days later (when the groups shot down 9 more) became the first ace in the group and the second in the ETO.

When the Eighth Air Force resumed deep penetration bombing missions between 2 and 14 October, the 56th FG shot down 37 Germans while losing just one Thunderbolt. Its radius of action had been considerably augmented on 31 August by the installation of new belly drop tank shackles on its P-47s that permitted use of 75-gallon steel drop tanks. The Thunderbolts were also modified to pressurize the tanks above 20,000 feet (6,100 m) by feeding vented air from the instrument vacuum pump into them, and became the norm for future operations, with range further extended periodically by the use of tanks of increasingly larger size. The use of wing tank pylons did not begin until May 1944 and because of its negative effect on maneuvering performance, was not preferred.

The addition of belly shackles also enabled the P-47 to carry bombs, and on a mission on 25 November both the 56th and 78th Fighter Groups bombed airfields in France, escorted by P-47s of the 353rd and 356th Groups. The 56th dropped from a horizontal attitude with mixed results, but the dive-bombing technique used by the 78th FG was particularly successful; the missions led to the subsequent development of the P-47 as a fighter-bomber, which became its primary role in the ETO.

Although bomber missions were cut back and contacts with German aircraft were sporadic for the remainder of the year, the 56th FG shot down 81 more Germans, including 23 on 26 November (for a single loss) and 17 on 11 December (2 lost). These actions was particularly effective in that the 56th destroyed large formations of Bf 110 "Zerstörers", twin-engined fighters that specialized in attacking bombers, without being drawn away by the more numerous single-engined fighter top cover. During its first seven months in combat the 56th FG shot down 167 aircraft (more than the 4th and 78th FGs combined), and lost 33 of its own to all causes. Ten of its pilots had become aces, and two (Capt. Walker M. Mahurin and 1st Lt. Robert S. Johnson) were double-aces (10 kills).

===== 1944 up to D-Day =====
The longer range and agility of the P-51 Mustang resulted in the decision in January 1944 to give the Eighth Air Force priority in the acquisition of the Mustang. New P-51 units of the Ninth would be exchanged for P-47 groups earmarked for the Eighth, and all VIII Fighter Command Thunderbolt and P-38 Lightning groups would eventually be re-equipped with the Mustang. The sole exception to this change was the 56th Fighter Group, which decided to retain its P-47s for the duration.

On 11 January the 56th flew its first double-group mission, protecting bombers flying to targets in central Germany. Dispatching 72 fighters, the force was divided into an "A Group" and a "B Group", both with three squadron formations, each squadron with 12 fighters. At the direction of Army Air Forces chief General Henry H. Arnold, with the objective of destroying the Luftwaffe where it could be found, the Eighth Air Force released its fighters to strafe targets of opportunity while returning to base after completion of their primary escort mission. The 56th FG attacked Juvincourt-et-Damary, France, on 11 February on its first ground attack against German airfields.

The 56th Fighter Group won a Distinguished Unit Citation for a series of missions flown between 20 February and 9 March 1944. The campaign opened with Operation Argument, better known as "the Big Week", a sustained attempt to destroy the Luftwaffe in the air while attacking aircraft factories with strategic bombing. It was also the first use by P-47s of 150-gallon drop tanks, which boosted flight endurance time on the Thunderbolt from 1 hour 50 minutes on internal fuel to over three hours using an auxiliary tank. At the same time the 56th was assigned a bomber escort sector in the vicinity of Osnabrück, and the combination resulted in the shooting down of 49 Luftwaffe fighters over four days. The last week of the campaign saw the first USAAF bomber attacks on Berlin, and the group destroyed 38 more fighters in the air. The 56th Fighter Group recorded its 350th kill on 16 March, having shot down 140 German aircraft in 12 missions.

The campaign also resulted in highly publicized speculation of which among the emerging P-47 and P-51 aces would break the U.S. World War I record of 26 destroyed by Captain Eddie Rickenbacker. Pilots of the 56th who became well-known figures included Hub Zemke, Bud Mahurin, Bob Johnson, Jerry Johnson, and Gabby Gabreski, with Bob Johnson being the first to break Rickenbacker's mark on 8 May (as a result of which he was immediately grounded from further combat). Mahurin and Jerry Johnson were both shot down on 27 March, with Johnson being captured. Although Mahurin successfully returned to Allied territory, his knowledge of the French Resistance ended his combat tour.

On 15 April 1944, Operation Jackpot was initiated by VIII Fighter Command, a planned series of strafing attacks against specific German airfields. The hazardous nature of the airfield attacks can be demonstrated by comparing them to the mission of 13 April (which marked the first anniversary of the 56th FG in combat) just two days prior. Escorting bombers that day, VIII Fighter Command's 676 Lightnings, Mustangs, and Thunderbolts achieved 18 air-to-air kills against just 6 losses, while the airfield strafing mission had losses of 33 of the 616 fighters involved.

The Eighth Air Force needed Halesworth for a new B-24 Liberator group, and sent the 56th to RAF Boxted on 18 April, a base the 354th FG had just vacated, moving to southern England in preparation for the invasion of France. At the same time, a significant number of original 56th Group pilots reached the 200-hour limit that constituted completion of a fighter tour. At least 13 elected to continue with the 56th on a tour extension and were granted an immediate 30-day leave in the United States before continuing in combat. Although several second tour pilots were later killed, most survived to provide a sizable core of experienced leadership that enabled the 56th to maintain its position as the leading air-to-air combat fighter group.

The emergence of the P-51 as the long-range escort fighter of choice in the Eighth Air Force sharply reduced combat contacts for the P-47 groups, including the 56th. After splitting almost 550 victories with the P-47s in the Big Week-Berlin campaign, the five veteran groups of Mustangs totally dominated air-to-air combat in April, their 310 kills outscoring the Thunderbolts 6 to 1. Kills for the 56th FG dropped from 85 in March to just 18 in April. The situation was aggravated by the completion of tours of its veteran pilots, but was partially rectified by the recruitment of volunteer bomber pilots who had completed tours and by the invitation to six pilots of the Polish Air Force, serving with the RAF, to join Gabreski's 61st FS.

In a search for ways of increasing its air-to-air effectiveness, Col. Zemke devised a tactic later dubbed the "Zemke fan" to enhance the flexibility of escorts. Instead of flying close escort with the bombers, his concept called for the group to rendezvous at an easily found landmark in its escort zone, from which it would break up into individual flights and fan out in a 180° arc, maintaining contact to respond to attacks on the bomber stream.

On 12 May, the "Zemke fan" was tried for the first time and proved successful in initiating contacts. Although the engagements resulted in 18 kills for the 56th FG, both of Zemke's wingmen were shot down by Luftwaffe ace Major Gunther Rall of JG 11 (who was then shot down by 56th ace Joe Powers and his wingman) while Zemke's flight was still badly outnumbered. Zemke modified the tactic to fan out squadrons rather than flights. The tactic was later modified and adopted by other fighter groups.

The battle on 12 May was also notable in that 1st Lt. Robert J. Rankin, responding to Zemke's call for help, shot down five German fighters during the action, becoming the group's first "Ace in a day". The feat was repeated on 7 July by Capt. Fred J. Christensen, on 23 December by Col. David C. Schilling, and on 14 January 1945, by Capt. Felix D. Williamson.

The modified tactics were put into effect on an escort mission the morning of 22 May, when the 61st FS attacked a large number of Fw 190s of JG 11 over Höperhöfen airfield near Rotenburg an der Wümme and shot down 11 without loss. (meant here is Rotenburg-Wümme airfield. There were at least two losses, C.B. Nale, HV-J near Süderwalsede and R. Heineman, HV-N, near Westerwalsede) In a second mission that afternoon, the 56th was part of a 4-group Thunderbolt raid against a railroad bridge at Hasselt, Belgium, dropping 500-pound bombs at varying altitudes and using level, glide-bombing, and dive-bombing tactics, trying to determine the most effective means of using the P-47 as a fighter-bomber.

===== Summer and autumn 1944 =====
On the evening of 5 June 1944, all the P-47s of the group had their fuselages and wings painted with distinctive "invasion stripes" (see Camouflage, unit markings, and radio call signs above). Beginning at 0400 on 6 June, the 56th FG flew 16 group missions in two days in support of the invasion of France at Normandy. 12 of the missions were as fighter-bombers interdicting German lines of communication, and the Thunderbolts were attacked by German fighters on 7 June while at low altitude, but retained air superiority by shooting down 12. Five P-47s were lost, all but one shot down by ground fire.

The invasion marked a change in mission priorities for the 56th FG. While the group continued to contribute to bomber escort missions, its primary tasks became ground attack, first in attacking roads and railways, then in supporting the advance of Allied armies after the breakout of 25 July. Strafing attacks in July cost the 56th FG two veteran squadron commanders and aces: Capt. Joe Egan was killed on 19 July and the next day Lt. Col. Gabby Gabreski was forced to crashland in Germany and became a prisoner of war. Gabreski had matched Johnson's 27 victories on 27 June, then exceeded it on 5 July to tie the USAAF Pacific Theater's top ace Major Richard Bong for most victories in the USAAF at 28 (Bong went on to score 40).

Command of the 56th Fighter Group passed to Lt. Col. David C. Schilling on 12 August 1944, when Zemke accepted a transfer to command the novice 479th Fighter Group, whose commander had been shot down 10 August. Schilling had begun his second tour of operations at the end of July and had been group deputy commander since 19 August 1943. The ground attack missions of the 56th intensified as the group attacked Gelnhausen airfield on 5 September, destroying 78 aircraft and damaging 19, but losing four.

On 17 September the group along with the other remaining P-47 groups of VIII Fighter Command flew ground attack missions protecting the Allied airborne landings (Operation Market Garden) in the Netherlands. The next day the 56th, led by Major Harold E. Comstock, dispatched 39 fighters to attack antiaircraft positions in support of a resupply mission for the U.S. airborne divisions by B-24 bombers, for which the group was awarded its second Distinguished Unit Citation. Dueling flak sites near Oosterhout, Netherlands, despite a 500-foot (150 m) cloud ceiling and severe haze, the 56th lost 16 aircraft: 5 shot down over German-held territory, 9 crash-landed in Allied territory on the continent, and two crashed in England. Three of the 16 pilots were killed and 3 captured.

The 56th FG carried out other missions in conjunction with Operation Market Garden until 23 September. On 21 September, assigned a patrol sector between Deventer and Lochem to protect a resupply mission to Arnhem, the group attacked and destroyed 15 of a group of 22 Fw 190 aircraft. However, the 56th had been late arriving in its patrol area and had encountered the German fighters after they had already attacked RAF Stirlings of 38 Group, shooting down 15.

On 15 September, operational control of VIII Fighter Command's three fighter wings was placed directly under the headquarters of the bomb divisions, removing a layer of command, with a wing controlled by each division. After this date, the 56th Fighter Group's primary duty was protection of the B-24s of the 2nd Bomb Division based in East Anglia. On 1 November 1944, the 56th FG had its first encounter with Me 262 jets, resulting in a kill shared with another group.

During the Battle of the Bulge, the 56th FG engaged over 40 Luftwaffe fighters attempting to attack U.S. bombers supporting Allied ground forces on 23 December 1944. The 56th shot down 32 to become the first U.S. fighter group to be credited with more than 800 aircraft destroyed in both the air and strafing attacks, with group commander Schilling shooting down 5.

===== Final operations =====
The end of 1944 saw the 56th become the sole remaining group of P-47 Thunderbolts in the Eighth Air Force, as the 353rd FG converted to Mustangs on 2 October, the 356th FG on 20 November, and the 78th FG on 29 December. Beginning 3 January 1945, the 56th began receiving the P-47M, built to be the fastest Allied piston-driven fighter. Externally identical to the P-47D bubbletops, the P-47M had an up-powered R-2800-57C engine and also incorporated all the range-extending characteristics previously developed for the P-47, particularly use of a 215-gallon belly drop tank.

The 61st Fighter Squadron received the first P-47M-1-REs and immediately began encountering engine problems. Multiple engine failures, including two crash-landings, resulted in the grounding of the Ms on 26 February. Technical problems were believed resolved with the identification of brittle ignition harnesses (as experienced in the P-47C two years before) and the final D-model left the group on 1 March. On 4 March operations resumed, but four crashes in five days, three of them fatal, again led to grounding of the aircraft on 16 March. A dozen P-51B Mustangs were brought to Boxted in case rapid conversion to the P-51 became necessary, but the new problem of engine failure and oil tank rupture was traced to salt-water corrosion in the shipment of new engines overseas. By 24 March every engine and ignition harness on all the Ms had been replaced and the entire group was equipped with the new model, eventually receiving all 130 production P-47Ms.

The advent of the German jet threat and the belief by Allied intelligence that it used low grade (high flash point) fuels that resisted ignition by .50-caliber strikes led to the development of new ammunition for American fighters. The experimental round, called the T48, used a concentrated incendiary compound and had a muzzle velocity of 3,400 feet (1,000 m) per second, which was 20% greater than existing ammunition. The 56th FG was chosen to test the new ammunition in February 1945 but the teething problems of the P-47M postponed the tests until the mechanical problems were resolved. In April the 56th began airfield strafing attacks using the T-48 round, culminating in an attack on Eggebek airfield, in which the T48 was used extensively. The success of the tests resulted in the standardization of the new round as the M23 incendiary, issued to all groups but too late to see combat.

Colonel Schilling's extended tour ended 27 January and command of the group passed to Lt. Col. Lucian A. Dade, who had been one of the group's original pilots as a second lieutenant and had served as squadron commander, operations officer, and deputy commander of the group. During his duty as operations officer, "Pete" Dade had been forbidden to fly combat missions by Zemke and was still on his first combat tour after two years in theater. This led to some distrust of his ability as an aggressive leader among the pilots, although as one historian noted, Zemke and Schilling were "hard acts to follow". Despite this Dade led 49 fighters to Eggebek on 13 April, locating 150 to 200 aircraft parked on the field and two nearby satellite strips.

Employing the 62nd FS at 15,000 feet (4,600 m) as top cover, the 61st FS orbited at 10,000 feet (3,000 m) while the 63rd FS dove on the field, its first pass to suppress ground fire, and then completed 140 individual passes on the fields, claiming 44 destroyed. The 61st then attacked, making 94 passes and claiming 25 destroyed, followed by the 62nd, making 105 and claiming 26. One Thunderbolt (P-47M 44-21134 UN: P, Teacher's Pet, 1st Lt. William R. Hoffman, 63rd FS) was shot down and the pilot killed when his parachute did not open in time. The totals for the day were 339 passes, 95 aircraft destroyed and another 95 damaged, and more than 78,000 rounds of ammunition expended. 2nd Lt. Randall Murphy of the 63rd FS, using T48 ammunition, was credited after a review of his gun camera film with 10 planes destroyed, the high mark for the group.

On 16 April, during another strafing mission, the final P-47 of the 56th FG went down (P-47M 44-21230, LM: A, Capt. Edward W. Appel, 62nd FS) but its pilot successfully returned to Allied lines, and on 21 April the group flew its final combat mission. Freeman's statistical summary lists 447 group missions; 19,391 sorties; 64,302 hours of combat flight time; 128 P-47s shot down (85 by ground fire); 44 P-47s destroyed in ETO accidents; 18 pilots awarded the Distinguished Service Cross (Col. Schilling twice); and 28 awards of the Silver Star. Three of the original group pilots—Dade, deputy commander and subsequent group commander Lt. Col. Donald D. Renwick, and operations officer Major James R. Carter—were assigned to the group at the end of the war.

==== Aerial victory claims ====
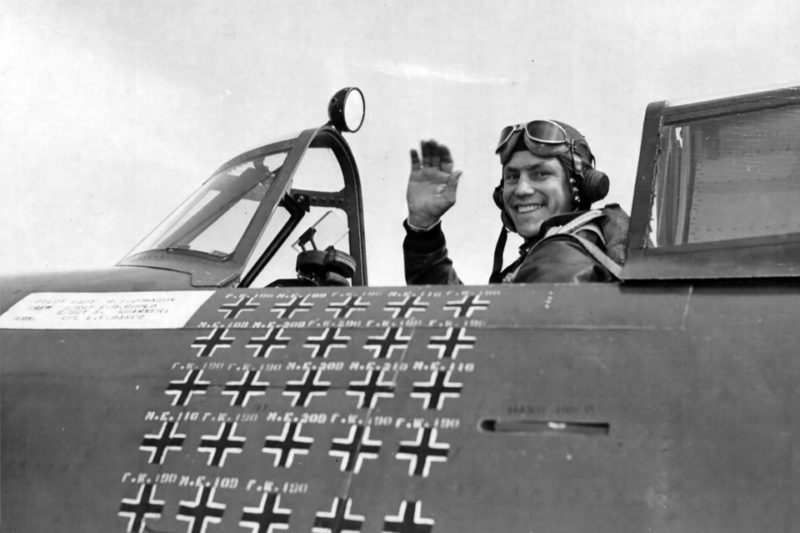
Capt. Robert Johnson and 'scoreboard' painted on his P-47

Capt. Walter V. Cook C, 62d Fighter Squadron, flying P-47C 41-6343 (LM-W Little Cookie), claimed the first aerial victory by a 56th pilot on 12 June 1943, over Blankenberge, Belgium, downing an Fw 190. The group's final victory was an Me 262 of JG 7 shot down on 10 April 1945, by 2d Lt. Walter J. Sharbo, also of the 62d Fighter Squadron, in P-47M 44-21237 (LM-C Marion – North Dakota Kid), near Wittstock, Germany.

The 56th Fighter Group had 677½ claims credited by the Eighth Air Force for German aircraft destroyed in air-to-air combat. U.S. Air Force Historical Study No. 85 recognizes 674.5 aerial victories for the 56th. This total is the second highest among USAAF fighter groups in the ETO (behind the 354th Group with 701), the highest among all Eighth Air Force groups, and the highest among all P-47 groups of the USAAF. Eighth Air Force also credited the 357th Fighter Group with 311 German aircraft destroyed on the ground, making an overall total of 976.5, which is second among all Eighth Air Force fighter groups.

Of the air-to-air totals, 4.5 were Me 262 jets. 2d Lt. Walter Groce of the 63d FS shared a credit on 1 November 1944, with a P-51 pilot of the 352d FG for one of the first Me 262 jets shot down. P-47Ms accounted for four: Maj. George Bostwick and 2d Lt. Edwin M. Crosthwait, 63d FS on 25 March 1945, over Parchim; Capt. John Fahringer, 63rd FS, on 5 April; and Sharbo on 10 April. Two AR 234 jet bombers were claimed 14 March 1945, by the 62d FS, 1st Lt. Norman D. Gould shooting down one and the other shared by 1st Lt. Sandford N. Ball and 1st Lt. Warren S. Lear.

Among the various units of the 56th, the 61st Fighter Squadron had the most victories, 232 shot down by 68 pilots. The 62d Fighter Squadron was credited with 219.5 kills by 79 pilots, the 63d Fighter Squadron with 174.25 kills by 64 pilots, and group headquarters with 39.75 kills by 4 pilots.

Aerial victories by unit and period

Unit	Jun–Dec 1943	Jan–Jun 1944	Jul–Dec 1944	Jan–Apr 1945	Unit Total
61st FS	60	141	29	2	232
62d FS	43 ½	87	69	20	219 ½
63d FS	48	56 ¾	50½	19	174 ¼
Grp HQ	15 ½	15 ¼	9	0	39 ¾
Period Tot	167	300	157 ½	41	665 ½

==== Aces of the 56th Fighter Group ====
Counting only air-to-air victory claims registered while with the group (therefore discounting air-to-ground claims), the 56th produced 39 aces, the second-most of any ETO fighter group (the 354th Fighter Group of the Ninth Air Force and the 357th Fighter Group, flying P-51s, each had 42).

Pilot	Sqdrn	Credits	Casualty Status	Personal Aircraft
Lt. Col. Francis S. "Gabby" Gabreski	61	28	POW 20 July 1944	
Major Robert S. Johnson	61, 62	27		All Hell, Lucky, Double Lucky, Penrod & Sam
Col. David C. Schilling	Grp	22.5		Whack, Hairless Joe
Capt. Fred J. Christensen Jr.	62	21.5		"Boche Buster"-Rozzie Geth, Miss Fire-Rozzie Geth II
Major Walker M. "Bud" Mahurin	63	19.75	Evaded 27 March 1944	"Spirit of Atlantic City, N.J."
Major Gerald W. "Jerry" Johnson	61, 62	16.5	POW 27 March 1944	In the Mood – "Jackson County, Michigan, Fighter"
Col. Hubert A. "Hub" Zemke	Grp	15.25	POW	Happy Warrior – "Oregon's Britannia"
Capt. Joseph H. Powers Jr.	61, 62	14.5		Powers' Girl
Capt. Felix D. "Willie" Williamson	62	13		Willie
Major Leroy A. Schreiber	61, 62	12	KIA 15 April 1944	
Major James C. Stewart	61	11.5		
Major Paul A. Conger	61, 62	11.5		Hollywood High Hatter – "Redondo Beach, California"
Capt. Michael J. Quirk	62	11	POW 9 September 1944	
1st Lt. Robert J. "Shorty" Rankin	61	10		
Sqd. Ldr. Boleslaw M. Gladych	61	10		Pengie and four successors
1st Lt. Stanley D. "Fats" Morrill	62	9	Died when assisting in rescue of B24 bomber crews that collided over Henham, Suffolk, 29 March 1944	Fats-Btfsplk, Debt Collector
Major Michael J. Jackson	62	8		Teddy
Major George E. Bostwick	62, 63	8¹		Ugly Duckling
1st Lt. Glen D. Schiltz Jr.	63	8		Pam
Capt. Robert A. Lamb	61	7		Jackie
Major Leslie C. Smith	61	7		Silver Lady
1st Lt. Frank W. Klibbe	61	7		Little Chief-Anderson, Indiana
1st Lt. Robert J. Keen	61	7		Ice Cold Kattie
2nd Lt. Billy G. Edens	62	7	POW 9 September 1944	
1st Lt. John H. "Lucky" Truluck, Jr.	63	7		Lady Jane
Capt. Mark L. Moseley	62	6.5		Sylvia
Major James R. Carter	61	6		Silver Lady
Capt. Walter V. Cook	62	6		Little Cookie
Capt. Cameron M. Hart	63	6		
1st Lt. George F. Hall	63	6		
1st Lt. Frank E. McCauley	61	5.5		Rat Racer
Major Donovan F. "Dieppe" Smith	61	5.5		Ole Cock, Ole Cock II
Lt. Norman D. Gould	62	5.5		
Capt. Joseph H. Bennett	61	5.5		Ann II, Lucky
F.O. Evan O. McMinn	61	5	Killed in action 6 June 1944	
2nd Lt. Steven N. Gerick	61	5		
2nd Lt. Joe W. Icard	62	5	Killed in action 8 March 1944	
Major Harold E. "Bunny" Comstock	63	5		Happy Warrior
Capt. Joseph L. Egan, Jr.	63	5	Killed in action 19 July 1944	Holy Joe
Capt. John W. Vogt, Jr.	63	5		Lucky Little Devil
Capt. Eugene W. O'Neill Jr.	62	5		

SOURCE: USAF Historical Study 85. Nickname source Little Friends website and Freeman, 56th Fighter Group
¹Totals include one Me 262 jet shot down

==== Bases, commanders, and casualties ====
56th FG losses
128	P-47's lost in combat
44	P-47's lost in accidents
10	P-47's written off for battle damage
84	killed in action or missing in action
30	killed in accidents
34	captured
27	Wounded in action
	SOURCES:
	Freeman, 56th Fighter Group p. 118
	Little Friends

56th FG commanders

Group Commanders	Date of command
Lt. Col. Davis D. Graves	December 1941
Col. John C. Crosthwaite	1 June 1942
Col. Hubert A. Zemke	16 September 1942
Col. Robert B. Landry	30 October 1943
Col. Hubert A. Zemke	19 January 1944
Col. David C. Schilling	12 August 1944
Lt. Col. Lucian A. Dade, Jr.	27 January 1945
Lt. Col. Donald D. Renwick	August 1945
(vacant, then inactivated)	10 October 1945

=== Postwar history ===
==== Strategic Air Command ====
With the end of hostilities, the unit's aircraft went to depots in September 1945. The unit transferred stateside on 11 October 1945 on the RMS Queen Mary, arriving at New York, 16 October 1945 and was inactivated 18 October 1945 at Camp Kilmer, New Jersey.

The Group was reactivated on 1 May 1946 as a Strategic Air Command fighter group, being assigned to Fifteenth Air Force at Selfridge Field, Michigan, equipped with P-47 and North American P-51 Mustang fighters until the unit was re-equipped with Lockheed P-80 Shooting Stars in 1947. The group trained to maintain proficiency as a mobile strike force including the bomber escort mission until transferred from Strategic Air Command to Continental Air Command on 1 December 1948. In July 1948, in response to the Berlin Blockade, the group made the first west to east flight by jet aircraft across the Atlantic Ocean, staging through Dow Air Force Base on 20 July and refueling in Labrador, Greenland and Iceland. The group's Shooting Stars arrived in Scotland 9 hours and 20 minutes after taking off from Dow.

==== Air Defense Command ====
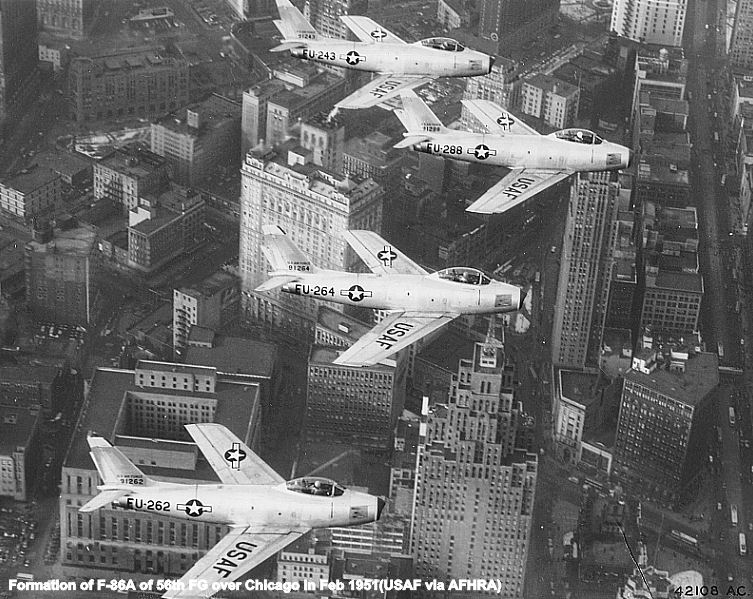
56th Fighter Group F-86A Sabres of the 62d FS flying in formation over Chicago, 1951.

On 15 August 1947, the 56th Fighter Wing was activated under the Wing-Base (Hobson Plan) reorganization, and the 56th Fighter Group was assigned to the wing as a subordinate unit. The group added an air defense mission in the north central US in April 1949, which continued through February 1952 after the wing's subsequent assignment to Air Defense Command (ADC). It was redesignated 56th Fighter-Interceptor Group on 20 January 1950. As ADC dispersed its squadrons to improve air defense coverage, the 62d Fighter-Interceptor Squadron (FIS) deployed to O'Hare International Airport (IAP), Illinois in August 1950 and the 63d FIS moved to Oscoda AFB, Michigan in January 1951.

The group's responsibility grew in May 1951 when the 176th FIS of the Michigan Air National Guard, flying F-51 Mustangs was federalized at Kellogg Field in response to the Korean War and was attached to the group. The 176th FIS moved to Selfridge six days after being federalized. In late July the 136 FIS of the New York Air National Guard at Niagara Falls Municipal Airport, was also federalized and attached to the group. The 176th was flying F-47 Thunderbolts when federalized, reuniting the group with the plane it flew during World War II.

The group was inactivated along with the 56th Fighter-Interceptor Wing on 6 February 1952, as ADC converted its fighter force into a series of regional Air Defense Wings. This major reorganization of ADC responded to ADC's difficulty under the Wing/Base organizational structure in deploying fighter interceptor squadrons to best advantage. The group's squadrons were transferred to the 4708th Defense Wing at Selfridge and the 4706th Defense Wing at O'Hare IAP, which had been activated five days earlier.

The group was redesignated the 56th Fighter Group (Air Defense) and replaced the 501st Air Defense Group at O'Hare IAP on 18 August 1955, assuming the 501st's air defense mission and operation of USAF base facilities at O'Hare as part of ADC's Project Arrow, which was designed to bring back on the active list the fighter units which had compiled memorable records in the two world wars. It was assigned several support organizations to fulfill these responsibilities. The 62d FIS, which was already stationed at O'Hare, and the 63d FIS, which moved from Michigan on paper to replace the 501st's 42d FIS were assigned to the group. Both squadrons were equipped with airborne intercept radar equipped and Mighty Mouse rocket armed North American F-86D Sabre aircraft. The 62d FIS converted to Sabres with data link for interception control through the Semi-Automatic Ground Environment system in late 1956 and was followed by the 63d FIS in 1957. In January 1958, the group was reduced to a single operational squadron when the 63d FIS was inactivated.

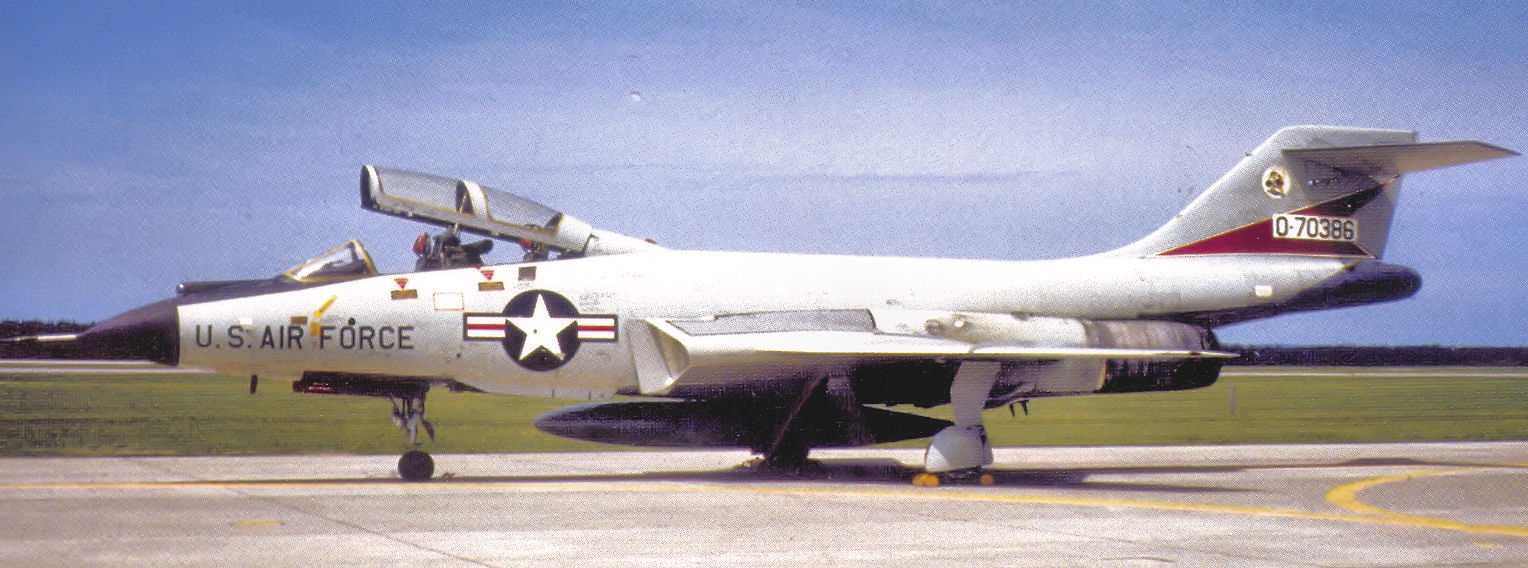
62d FIS F-101B at K.I. Sawyer AFB

The 62d FIS moved to K. I. Sawyer AFB, Michigan on 1 August 1959. Although it remained assigned to the group, it was attached to 473d Fighter Group until 1 October 1959 when the group moved to K.I. Sawyer on paper and absorbed the resources of the 473d. In November, the 62d converted to the supersonic McDonnell F-101 Voodoo, armed with GAR-1 and GAR-2 Falcon missiles. The group was discontinued and its support units reassigned on 1 February 1961 as the group was replaced at K.I. Sawyer by the 56th Fighter Wing. Its 62d Fighter-Interceptor Squadron remained active flying Voodoos at K.I. Sawyer until 1969.

During the Vietnam War, the parent 56th Air Commando Wing (later 56th Special Operations Wing) carried out unconventional warfare missions over various areas of Southeast Asia (Vietnam until mid-January 1973, Cambodia until 22 February, Laos until 15 August), although the group remained inactive. While still inactive the group was redesignated 56th Tactical Fighter Group on 31 July 1985.

==== 56th Operations Group ====
The group was redesignated and activated in on 1 November 1991 as the 56th Operations Group and assigned to the 56th Fighter Wing at MacDill AFB, Florida. The 56th OG was the operational component of the wing under the new "Objective Wing" concept adapted by the Air Force. It conducted F-16 transition training at MacDill until mid-1993, phasing down its operations until inactivated 4 January 1994 with the phaseout of fighter operations at MacDill.

The 56th was subsequently reactivated at Luke Air Force Base, Arizona, on 1 April 1994, where it replaced on paper the inactivating 58th Operations Group. It has provided F-16 training operations since and also conducted F-15E Strike Eagle combat crew training for a period between April 1994 and March 1995.

=== Lineage ===
- Constituted as 56th Pursuit Group (Interceptor) on 20 November 1940

Activated on 15 January 1941
Redesignated 56th Fighter Group on 15 May 1942
Inactivated on 18 October 1945

- Activated on 1 May 1946

Redesignated 56th Fighter-Interceptor Group on 20 January 1950
Inactivated on 6 February 1952

- Redesignated 56th Fighter Group (Air Defense) on 20 June 1955

Activated on 18 August 1955
Discontinued, and inactivated, on 1 February 1961
Redesignated 56th Tactical Fighter Group on 31 July 1985

- Redesignated 56th Operations Group on 28 October 1991

Activated on 1 November 1991
Inactivated on 4 January 1994

- Activated on 1 April 1994.

=== Assignments ===
- Southeast Air District (later, Third Air Force), 15 January 1941

Attached to 17th Bombardment Wing [Light], 15 January – 16 May 1941
Attached to III Interceptor Command, c. 17 June – 1 October 1941

- III Interceptor Command, 2 October 1941
- I Interceptor (later, I Fighter) Command, 15 January 1942
- New York Air Defense Wing, 11 August 1942
- VIII Fighter Command, 12 January 1943
- 4th Air Defense Wing, 30 June 1943
- 65th Fighter Wing, 7 August 1943

Attached to: 2d Bombardment (later Air) Division. 15 September 1944 – 10 October 1945

- Fifteenth Air Force, 1 May 1946

Attached to 65 Combat Fighter Wing, Very Long Range, Provisional, Jan-14 August 1947

- 56 Fighter (later, 56 Fighter-Interceptor) Wing, 15 August 1947 – 6 February 1952
- 4706th Air Defense Wing, 18 August 1955
- 37th Air Division, 8 February 1956
- 30th Air Division, 1 April 1959
- Sault Sainte Marie Air Defense Sector, 1 April 1960 – 1 February 1961

Attached to 30th Air Division, 1 April – 14 June 1960

- 56th Fighter Wing, 1 November 1991 – 4 January 1994; 1 April 1994 – present

=== Components ===
==== Operational Squadrons ====
- 21st Fighter Squadron: 8 August 1996 – present
- 61st Pursuit (later, 61st Fighter, 61st Fighter-Interceptor; 61st Fighter) Squadron: 15 January 1941 – 18 October 1945; 1 May 1946 – 6 February 1952; 1 November 1991 – 12 August 1993; 1 April 1994 – 27 August 2010; 27 October 2013 – present.
- 62d Pursuit (later, 62d Fighter; 62d Fighter-Interceptor; 62d Fighter) Squadron: 15 January 1941 – 18 October 1945; 1 May 1946 – 6 February 1952 (detached c. 28 December 1946-c. 10 April 1947 and c. 28 July 1950 – 6 February 1952); 18 August 1955 – 1 February 1961 (detached 1 August – 30 September 1959); 1 November 1991 – 14 May 1993; 1 April 1994 – present.
- 63d Pursuit (later, 63d Fighter; 63d Fighter-Interceptor; 63d Fighter) Squadron: 15 January 1941 – 18 October 1945; 1 May 1946 – 6 February 1952; 18 August 1955 – 8 January 1958; 1 November 1991 – 25 February 1993; 1 April 1994 – 22 May 2009.
- 72d Fighter Squadron: 1 November 1991 – 19 June 1992
- 136th Fighter-Interceptor Squadron: attached 21 July 1951 – 6 February 1952
- 172d Fighter-Interceptor Squadron: attached 1 May 1951 – 6 February 1952
- 308th Fighter Squadron: 1 April 1994 – 25 June 2015; 30 November 2018 – present
- 309th Fighter Squadron: 1 April 1994 – present
- 310th Fighter Squadron: 1 April 1994 – present
- 311th Fighter Squadron: 1 January – 26 September 1995.
- 312th Fighter Squadron: 2 June 2023 – present
- 425th Fighter Squadron: 1 April 1994 – present
- 461st Fighter Squadron: 1 April – 5 August 1994
- 550th Fighter Squadron: 1 April 1994 – 31 March 1995; 21 June 2017 – present

==== Support Units ====
- 56th USAF Infirmary (later 56th USAF Dispensary, 56th USAF Hospital), 18 August 1955 – 1 February 1961
- 56th Air Base Squadron, 18 August 1955 – 1 February 1961
- 56th Consolidated Aircraft Maintenance Squadron, 18 August 1955 – 1 February 1961
- 56th Materiel Squadron, 18 August 1955 – 1 February 1961
- 56th Operations Support Squadron, 1 November 1991 – present

=== Stations ===
- Savannah Army Air Base, Georgia, 15 January 1941
- Charlotte Army Airbase, North Carolina, 26 May 1941
- Charleston Army Airfield, South Carolina, c. 10 December 1941
- Teaneck Armory, New Jersey, 17 January 1942
- Bridgeport Army Airfield, Connecticut, 6 July–Dec 1942
- RAF Kings Cliffe (USAAF Station 367), England, 12 January 1943
- RAF Horsham St Faith (USAAF Station 123), England, 5 April 1943
- RAF Halesworth (USAAF Station 365), England, 9 July 1943
- RAF Boxted (USAAF Station 150), England, 19 April 1944
- RAF Little Walden (USAAF Station 165), England, c. 15 September – 11 October 1945
- Camp Kilmer, New Jersey, 16–18 October 1945
- Selfridge Field (later AFB), Michigan, 1 March 1946 – 6 February 1952
- O'Hare International Airport, Illinois, 18 August 1955
- K. I. Sawyer AFB, Michigan, 1 October 1959 – 1 February 1961
- MacDill AFB, Florida, 1 November 1991 – 4 January 1994
- Luke AFB, Arizona, 1 April 1994 – present

== Honors and campaigns ==
Distinguished Unit Citation

- European Theater of Operations, 20 February 1944 – 9 March 1944
- Holland, 18 September 1944

Air Force Outstanding Unit Award

- 1 July 1994 – 30 June 1996
- 1 July 1996 – 30 June 1998
- 1 July 1998 – 30 June 2000
- 1 July 2001 – 30 June 2003
- 1 July 2003 – 30 June 2005
- 1 July 2005 – 30 June 2006
- 1 July 2006 – 30 June 2007
- 1 July 2007 – 30 June 2008

American Theater of World War II European Theatre of World War II

=== Campaigns ===
Air Offensive, Europe
Normandy
Northern France
Rhineland
Ardennes-Alsace
Central Europe
Air Combat EAME
