= Robert J. Keen =

American flying ace

Robert James Keen
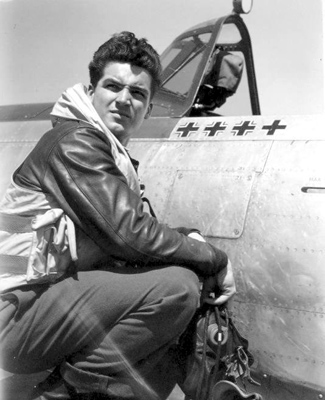
- Born: October 25, 1923 (Note: Most online sources and obituary state 1923 as Keen's year of birth, while his grave marker state 1924 as his year of birth.); Jacksonville, Florida, U.S.
- Died: May 29, 1992 (aged 68)
- Burial place: Evergreen Memorial Park; Sumter, South Carolina, U.S.
- Military career
- Allegiance: United States
- Branch: United States Air Force
- Service years: 1942–1972
- Rank: Lieutenant colonel
- Nickname: "Ace"
- Units: 61st Fighter Squadron, 56th Fighter Group
- Commands: 307th Strategic Fighter Squadron
- Conflicts: World War II
- Awards: Distinguished Service Cross; Distinguished Flying Cross (3); Meritorious Service Medal; Air Medal (9)

Robert James Keen (October 25, 1923 – May 29, 1992) was an American flying ace in the 56th Fighter Group during World War II. He retired from the United States Air Force in 1972, after 30 years of distinguished service.

== Military career ==
He enlisted in the U.S. Army Reserve on June 3, 1942, and on November 13, he entered the Aviation Cadet Program of the U.S. Army Air Forces. He was commissioned a second lieutenant and awarded his pilot wings on August 30, 1943.

=== World War II ===
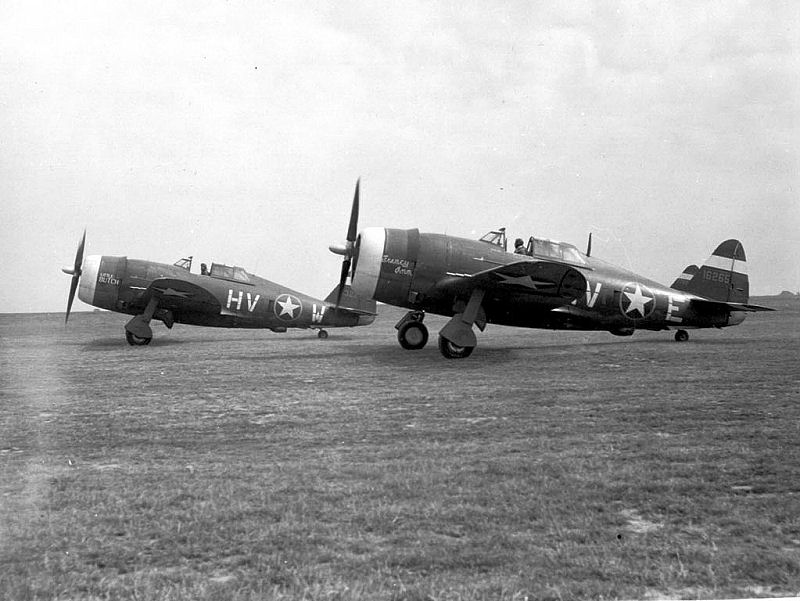
P-47 Thunderbolts of 61st FS

After completing his training in the P-47 Thunderbolt, Keen was assigned to the 61st Fighter Squadron of the 56th Fighter Group at RAF Halesworth in January 1944. He scored his first aerial victories on May 13, when he shot down three Focke-Wulf Fw 190s and one probable (and later confirmed) shootdown of an Fw 190 over Hagenow, Germany, while protecting a formation of B-17 Flying Fortresses. For his actions, Keen was awarded the Distinguished Service Cross.

He scored his final aerial victories on July 5, when he shot down three Messerschmitt Bf 109s over Évreux, France, thus becoming a flying ace.

During World War II, Keen was credited with the destruction of 7 enemy aircraft in aerial combat plus 1 damaged, and 7 destroyed on the ground while strafing enemy airfields. Initially he was credited with only 6 aerial victories until the Air Force Historical Research Agency revised his one probable aerial victory on May 13, 1944, to confirmed in 2002. While serving with the 56th FG, he flew P-47s bearing the name "Ice Cold Kattie".

=== Post war ===
After United States Army Air Forces became United States Air Force, Keen attended aerial gunnery schools and served as a fighter pilot at various air bases. He was promoted to the rank of major on September 1, 1951, before serving as an F-84 Thunderjet pilot and commander of the 307th Strategic Fighter Squadron of the 31st Strategic Fighter Wing at Turner Air Force Base in Georgia, from June 1952 to March 1954.

From August 1957 to August 1961, he attended and served on the staff of the Air Command and Staff College at Maxwell Air Force Base in Alabama. He later attended Army War College at Carlisle Barracks in Pennsylvania, from August 1961 to July 1962. Throughout the 1950s and 1960s, Keen served in various operations and staff positions within the United States Air Force, including serving in overseas posts such as operations staff officer in the headquarters of the U.S. Air Forces in Europe at Lindsey Air Station in West Germany, from July 1962 to August 1965, and chief of the Emergency Actions Element with the 314th Air Division at Osan Air Base in South Korea, from April 1969 to June 1970.

His final positions were as assistant chief of the Current Operations Division, and director of Command and Control at the headquarters of the Ninth Air Force at Shaw Air Force Base in South Carolina. Keen retired from the Air Force with the rank of lieutenant colonel on December 31, 1972.

== Later life ==
Keen was married to Catherine Mae, née Forshee (1925–2014). The couple had a son, Robert Keen, Jr., and two daughters, Linda Keen Glenn and Patricia Ann Keen.

Keen died on May 29, 1992, at the age of 68, of a heart attack. He was buried at the Evergreen Memorial Park in Sumter, South Carolina.

== Aerial victory credits ==
Date	#	Type	Location	Aircraft flown	Unit Assigned
May 13, 1944	4	Focke-Wulf Fw 190	Hagenow, Germany	P-47 Thunderbolt	61 FS, 56 FG
July 5, 1944	3	Messerschmitt Bf 109	Évreux, France	P-47	61 FS, 56 FG

== Awards and decorations ==
His awards include:

U.S. Air Force Command Pilot Badge
Distinguished Service Cross
Distinguished Flying Cross with two bronze oak leaf clusters
Meritorious Service Medal
Air Medal with one silver and three bronze oak leaf clusters
Air Force Commendation Medal
Air Force Presidential Unit Citation with two bronze oak leaf clusters
Air Force Outstanding Unit Award
American Campaign Medal
European-African-Middle Eastern Campaign Medal with three bronze campaign stars
World War II Victory Medal
National Defense Service Medal with service star
Armed Forces Expeditionary Medal
Korea Defense Service Medal
Air Force Longevity Service Award with silver and bronze oak leaf clusters
Small Arms Expert Marksmanship Ribbon

=== Distinguished Service Cross citation ===

Keen, Robert J.
Second Lieutenant, U.S. Army Air Forces
61st Fighter Squadron, 56th Fighter Group, 8th Air Force
Date of Action: May 13, 1944
