= David C. Schilling =

U.S. Air Force officer & fighter ace (1918-1956)

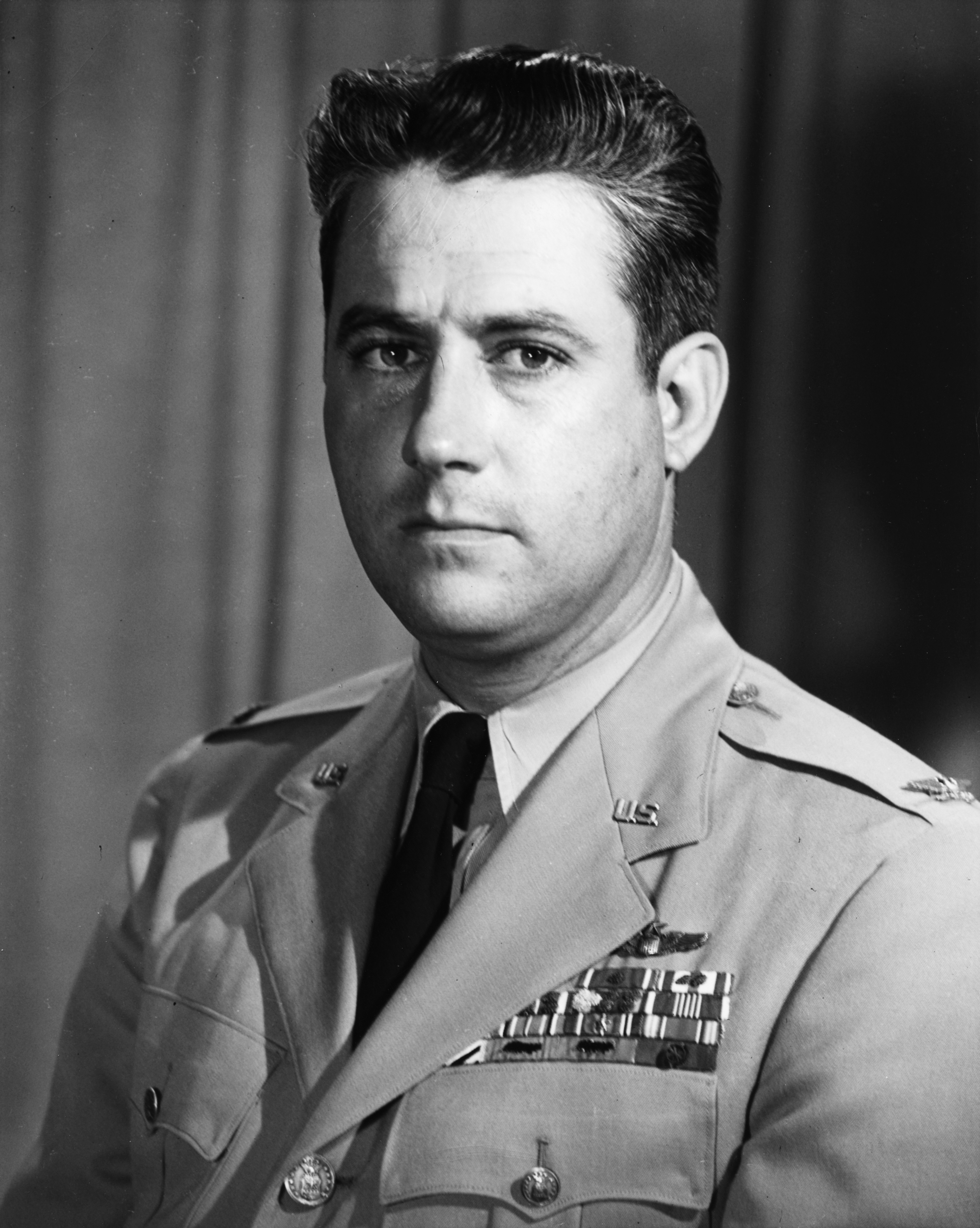
- Born: 15 December 1918; Leavenworth, Kansas, U.S.
- Died: 14 August 1956 (aged 37); Eriswell, Suffolk, England
- Burial place: Arlington National Cemetery
- Military career
- Allegiance: United States of America
- Branch: United States Army Air Forces; United States Air Force
- Service years: 1939–1956
- Rank: Colonel
- Service number: O-393204
- Commands: 62d Fighter Squadron; 56th Fighter Group; 31st Fighter Escort Wing
- Conflicts: World War II
- Awards: Distinguished Service Cross (2); Army Distinguished Service Medal; Silver Star (3); Distinguished Flying Cross (11); Air Medal (20)

David Carl Schilling (15 December 1918 – 14 August 1956) was a U.S. Air Force officer, fighter ace credited with 22½ confirmed claims, and leading advocate of long-range jet fighter operations. Kansas' Schilling Air Force Base was named in his memory.

== Early life ==
David Schilling was born in Leavenworth, Kansas, on 15 December 1918. His family moved to Kansas City, Missouri, where he went to high school. He graduated from Dartmouth College with a Bachelor of Science degree in Geology in June 1939.

Schilling joined the United States Army in September 1939 as an aviation cadet and received his commission in the Air Corps upon completion of flight training in May 1940. The following summer he became one of the original members of the 56th Fighter Group.

== World War II ==
Schilling arrived with the group in England in January 1943 as commander of the 62nd Fighter Squadron and began combat missions in April flying the P-47 Thunderbolt, recording his first kill on 2 October 1943. Schilling was promoted to group executive officer in August 1943 and to group commander on 12 August 1944, commanding the 56th Fighter Group until 27 January 1945. He was promoted to full colonel on 1 October 1944, at the age of 25. "Hairless Joe", coded LM-S was his personal P-47 from July 1944 up until his last documented combat mission on 5 Jan 1945.

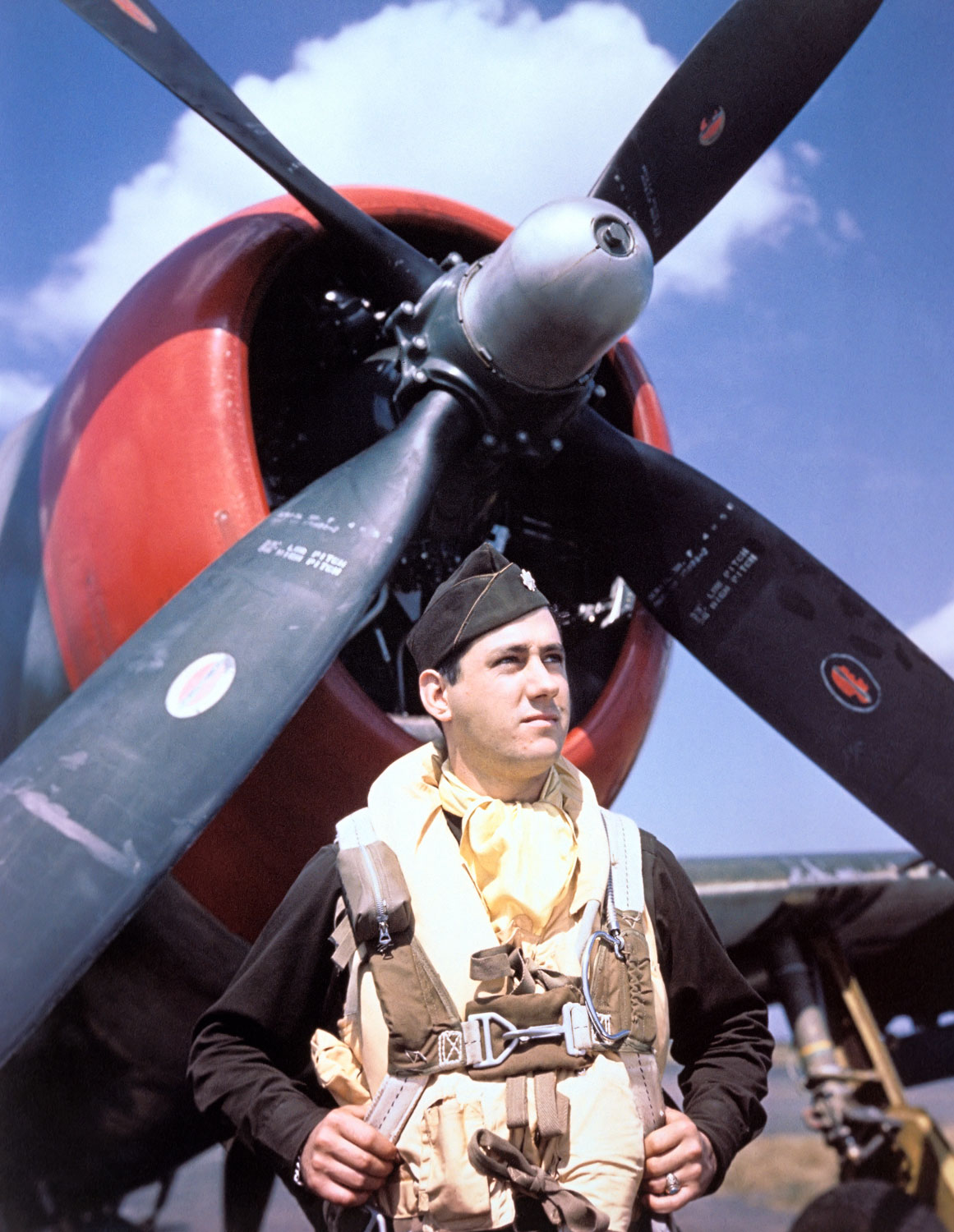
Schiling at Boxted Airfield, 1944

In his time in Britain, he became the sixth-leading ace of the 8th Air Force, scoring 22½ kills against Luftwaffe aircraft. On 23 December 1944, he downed five German fighters to become one of the 38 Army Air Force "Ace-in-a-Day" pilots. One of his victims may have been Heinrich Bartels who was shot down and killed that day. Schilling flew 132 combat missions in two combat tours with the 56th. He also destroyed 10.5 enemy aircraft on ground, while strafing enemy airfields.

== USAF career ==
After the war, he again commanded the 56th Fighter Group and pioneered long-distance jet operations in the P-80 Shooting Star. In early 1948 Schilling conceived an operation called Fox Able (phonetic for "Fighter Atlantic") in which jet aircraft, then ferried to Europe by ship, could be flown across the Atlantic via Iceland and Scotland in 900-mile legs and sold it to Air Force Chief of Staff, General Carl A. Spaatz.

In the summer of 1948 he made Fox Able a reality and took the 56th FG to Germany in a show-of-force response to the Berlin Blockade. Just prior to this, de Havilland Vampires of No. LIV Squadron RAF had made the first jet crossing, flying from the UK to North America.

In 1950, he flew from RAF Manston in the United Kingdom to Maine in the United States, in the first nonstop trans-Atlantic flight by a jet fighter. Using probe-and-drogue flight refuelling, Schilling, flying an F-84E Thunderjet and another F-84E flown by Col. William Ritchie, were refuelled by first a Flight Refuelling Ltd (FRL) Lancaster tanker near Prestwick, Scotland, followed by a refuelling from another FRL tanker, this time a Lincoln near Iceland.

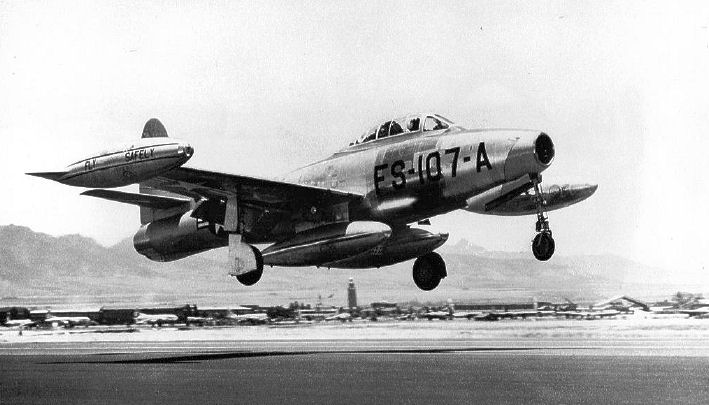
Schilling takes off from Hawaii to lead his squadron the rest of the way across the Pacific Ocean (1952).

In a third and final tanker rendezvous, Ritchie's nose probe, which had been damaged in the refuelling with the Lincoln, was unable to transfer fuel from the final tanker, a USAF KB-29 offshore from Labrador, forcing him to eject over Labrador when he ran out of fuel. Ritchie was safely picked up shortly afterwards. Schilling's refuelling went as-intended and he landed at an airbase at Limestone, Maine, after a flight of ten hours and eight minutes. For this flight, Schilling received the Harmon Trophy.

In 1952, he took command of the 31st Fighter Escort Wing at Turner Air Force Base, Georgia, flying F-84 Thunderjets, and led a non-stop flight across the Pacific Ocean to Japan in Fox Peter One.

=== Death ===
On 14 August 1956, while serving as Inspector General in the Strategic Air Command's Seventh Air Division, Schilling died in a car accident on a narrow, two-lane country road in England between RAF Lakenheath and RAF Mildenhall — Royal Air Force stations used by the U.S. Air Force. The day before his death, he had flown his last flight in a B-47. At the time of his death he was on Temporary Duty (TDY) from the HQ of 7th Air Division at South Ruislip to RAF Lakenheath.

He was buried with full military honors at Arlington National Cemetery.

On 15 March 1957, Smoky Hill Air Force Base in Salina, Kansas was renamed Schilling Air Force Base in his honor. The Air Force Association's Award for Outstanding Flight, which Schilling won in 1952, was named for him after his death.

== Awards and decorations ==
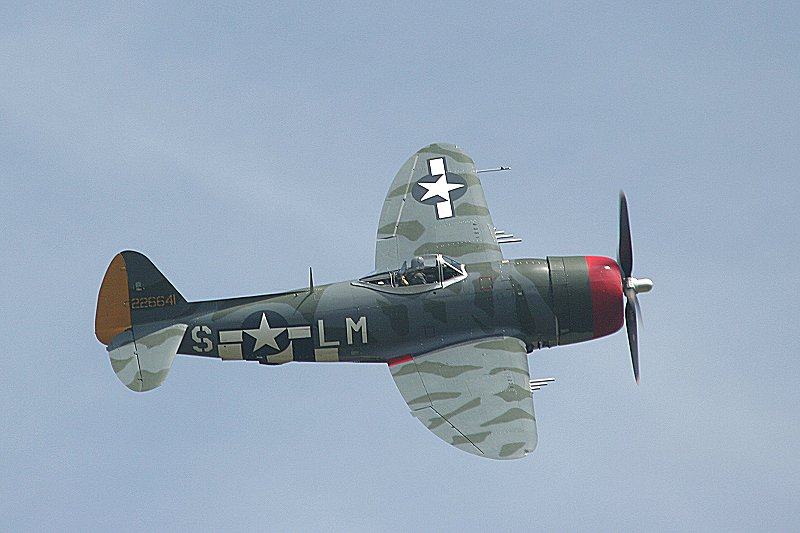
Replica of Schilling's P-47 Thunderbolt "Hairless Joe"

Command pilot

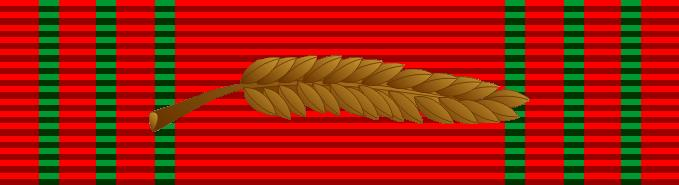
Distinguished Service Cross with bronze oak leaf cluster
Distinguished Service Medal
Silver Star with two bronze oak leaf clusters
Distinguished Flying Cross with two silver oak leaf clusters
Air Medal with three silver and one bronze oak leaf clusters
Air Medal with two bronze oak leaf clusters (second ribbon required for accouterment spacing)
Army Commendation Medal
Air Force Presidential Unit Citation with bronze oak leaf cluster
Air Force Outstanding Unit Award
American Defense Service Medal
American Campaign Medal
European-African-Middle Eastern Campaign Medal with one silver campaign star
World War II Victory Medal
National Defense Service Medal
Air Force Longevity Service Award with three bronze oak leaf clusters
Distinguished Flying Cross (United Kingdom)
Croix de Guerre with Palm (France)
Croix de Guerre with Palm (Belgium)
Officer of the Order of Leopold II (Belgium)

=== Distinguished Service Cross citation (1st Award) ===

Schilling, David C.
Lieutenant Colonel (Air Corps), U.S. Army Air Forces
56th Fighter Group, 8th Air Force
Date of Action: 9 April 1944

Citation:

The President of the United States of America, authorized by Act of Congress 9 July 1918, takes pleasure in presenting the Distinguished Service Cross to Lieutenant Colonel (Air Corps) David Carl Schilling, United States Army Air Forces, for extraordinary heroism in connection with military operations against an armed enemy while serving as Pilot of a P-47 Fighter Airplane in the 56th Fighter Group, Eighth Air Force, in aerial combat against enemy forces on 9 April 1944, in the European Theater of Operations. On this date Colonel Schilling, while leading a Group of fighter airplanes on a bomber escort mission over enemy territory, became separated from his entire Group, with the exception of one wing man. Sighting from 30 to 35 enemy fighters, Colonel Schilling, although thoroughly conscious of the terrific odds confronting him, attacked the enemy flight and destroyed one fighter, pieces of which damaged his own airplane. Despite the damage to his airplane he continued to attack and damaged another enemy fighter. In the course of further attacks against the main flight of the enemy Colonel Schilling's airplane blew a cylinder head under the strain. Although smoke and oil obscured his vision, and faced with imminent engine failure, with his fuel and ammunition dangerously low, so great was his determination to destroy the enemy that he single-handedly attacked two enemy fighters, one of which he destroyed. The outstanding heroism and aggressiveness displayed by Colonel Schilling upon this occasion reflect great credit upon himself and the Armed Forces of the United States.

=== Distinguished Service Cross citation (2nd Award) ===

Schilling, David C.
Lieutenant Colonel (Air Corps), U.S. Army Air Forces
56th Fighter Group, 8th Air Force
Date of Action: 23 December 1944

Citation:

The President of the United States of America, authorized by Act of Congress 9 July 1918, presented a Bronze Oak Leaf Cluster in lieu of a Second Award of the Distinguished Service Cross to Lieutenant Colonel (Air Corps) David Carl Schilling, United States Army Air Forces, for extraordinary heroism in connection with military operations against an armed enemy while serving as Pilot of a P-47 Fighter Airplane in the 56th Fighter Group, Eighth Air Force, in aerial combat against enemy forces on 23 December 1944, in the European Theater of Operations. On this date Lieutenant Colonel Schilling shot down five enemy aircraft to become an Ace in a single day. Lieutenant Colonel Schilling's valor in aerial combat is in keeping with the highest traditions of the military service and reflects great credit upon himself, the 8th Air Force, and the United States Army Air Forces.
