= Fred J. Christensen =

American World War II flying ace

Frederick Joseph Christensen Jr.
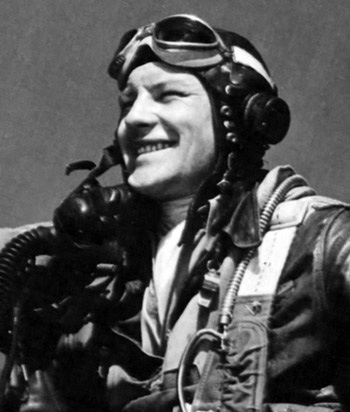
- Born: October 17, 1921; Watertown, Massachusetts, U.S.
- Died: April 4, 2006 (aged 84); Northborough, Massachusetts, U.S.
- Burial place: Massachusetts National Cemetery
- Military career
- Allegiance: United States
- Branch: United States Army Air Forces; Massachusetts Air National Guard; United States Air Force Reserve
- Service years: 1942–1970
- Rank: Lieutenant colonel
- Nicknames: Chris, "Rat Top"
- Unit: 56th Fighter Group
- Conflicts: World War II
- Awards: Silver Star (2); Distinguished Flying Cross (8); Air Medal (4)

Frederick Joseph Christensen Jr. (October 17, 1921 – April 4, 2006) was an American fighter pilot and flying ace who flew with the United States Army Air Forces during World War II. A member of the 56th Fighter Group in England, Christensen scored 21½ aerial victories. He later served 24 years as a command officer with both the Air National Guard and the Air Force Reserve, retiring as a lieutenant colonel.

== Early life ==
Christensen was born of Norwegian immigrant parents Frederik and Ruth Christensen in Watertown, Massachusetts, on October 17, 1921. His father worked as a machinist for Harvard University. Prior to World War II, he attended Boston University School of Music and the Massachusetts Institute of Technology.

== World War II ==
In 1942, Christensen joined the United States Army Air Forces as an aviation cadet and was commissioned in December 1942. After pursuit training, 2nd Lt. Christensen went to the Eighth Air Force in England in July 1943. Completing an operational training unit course at RAF Atcham to familiarize himself with the P-47 Thunderbolt fighter, he joined the 56th Fighter Group, based at RAF Halesworth, as a replacement pilot on August 26, 1943.

Christensen was assigned to the 62d Fighter Squadron. He was credited with his first German aircraft shot down on November 26, 1943, a Messerschmitt Bf 110 near Papenburg, Germany. He was recognized as an ace on February 11, 1944, with the crediting of his fifth kill, a Bf 109. He continued to regularly shoot down German aircraft, scoring two kills on the first day of Big Week, another on a long-range bomber escort to Berlin on March 6, and four more in consecutive missions of March 15 and 16.

Promoted to first lieutenant in February and captain in April, Christensen shot down his 16th aircraft on July 5, and also that day incurred the first battle damage of his tour. On July 7, leading the 62nd FS, Christensen was returning from a bomber escort mission and overflew Gardelegen Airfield, assessing it as a possible strafing target. Christensen noted numerous parked aircraft dispersed on the field, but then observed a flight of Junkers Ju 52 transports in trail at very low altitude, approaching to land.

Christensen dove on the landing pattern from 10,000 feet (3,000 m) and shot down the next-to-last transport with hits on the left side. He quickly overtook and fired at a second target, which burned and crashed. A third transport attempted to evade to the left, but he downed it with a deflection burst, setting its fuel tanks on fire. The German pilot attempted to land, but crashed short of the field.

As Christensen maneuvered for a fourth interception, his engine quit from fuel starvation. Christensen switched tanks, air-started his engine, and barely 100 feet (30 m) off the ground, fixed another Ju 52 in his sights. He scored several hits, and in its attempt to evade, the transport flew into the ground. Christensen attacked a fifth airplane, observing strikes on its fuselage and wing root, and shot it down before it could land. He then destroyed a sixth Ju 52 to become an "ace in a day" in an engagement that had lasted less than two minutes. In all, 10 of the 12 transports were shot down by the 62nd FS.

Christensen flew 107 combat sorties with the 56th Fighter Group and used five different aircraft to record his victories, including two assigned as his personal aircraft:

- P-47D-10-RE 42-75207 LM: C, named "Boche Buster" on the nose cowling and Rozzie Geth near the cockpit, and
- P-47D-25-RE 42-26628 LM: C, named Miss Fire and Rozzie Geth II. ("Rozzie Geth" was a diminutive of the name of a college girlfriend, Rosamand Gethro.)
- P-47D-21-RE 42-25522 LM: H, named "Sylvia" (backup plane, after Miss Fire was damaged, on this he became ace in day)

Christensen's 21.5 officially credited kills rank him 20th among all American aces, 12th among USAAF aces, 7th among of the 8th Air Force aces, and 5th among P-47 aces.

=== Sinbad ===
While in England, Christensen adopted a stray black cat and named it Sinbad. He is reputed to have taken Sinbad with him on missions, carrying him in the cockpit of his P-47 as both a good luck charm and inspiration to his fellow pilots, then bringing the cat to the United States as a pet in September 1944 after the end of his tour. A family anecdote held that a war correspondent covering the 56th FG tried to photograph the cat, which kept jumping all over packed parachutes. All of the pilots using the gear returned safely, contributing to his legend.

== Aerial victory credits ==
Chronicle of aerial victories
Date	#	Type	Location	Aircraft flown
November 26, 1943	1	Bf 110	Papenburg, Germany	P-47C-2 41-6193 LM: B Ginger
December 1, 1943	1	Bf 109	Roermond, Netherlands	P-47D-10 42-75207 LM: C "Boche Buster" – Rozzie Geth
January 5, 1944	1	Fw 190	Elberfeld, Germany	do
February 4, 1944	1	Fw 190	Frankfurt, Germany	do
February 11, 1944	1	Bf 109	Frankfurt, Germany	do
February 20, 1944	1.5	Bf 109	Dümmer Lake, Germany	do
March 6, 1944	1	unk	Dümmer Lake, Germany	do
March 15, 1944	2	unk	Brunswick, Germany	do
March 16, 1944	2	unk	Augsburg, Germany	do
April 15, 1944	2	Fw 190	Flensburg, Germany	unknown
June 27, 1944	1	Bf 109	Villeneuve, France	P-47D-25 42-26628 LM: C Miss Fire – Rozzie Geth II
July 5, 1944	1	Fw 190	Béziers, France	do
July 7, 1944	6	Ju 52	Gardelegen, Germany	P-47D-21 42-25522 LM: H Sylvia

Sources: Air Force Historical Study 85: USAF Credits for the Destruction of Enemy Aircraft, World War II, Freeman, The Mighty Eighth and 56th Fighter Group

== Post-war ==
Christensen became a member of the Massachusetts Air National Guard in 1947 and served as a full-time ANG pilot until 1961. He commanded 102nd Tactical Fighter Wing of the Massachusetts Air National Guard from November 1947 to August 30, 1961. He was base commander of the ANG base at Logan International Airport between 1948 and 1961, then joined the Air Force Reserve at Hanscom Air Force Base, Massachusetts. Christensen retired from military duty in 1970 with the rank of lieutenant colonel and retired from reserves on October 17, 1981.

Christensen resided in Wayland, Massachusetts, was a jazz musician on both the piano and clarinet, and was a member of the American Fighter Aces Association, the Massachusetts Aviation Historical Society, and the Order of Daedalians in addition to several veterans groups. He died of complications from diabetes on April 4, 2006, at Northborough, Massachusetts and is buried at Massachusetts National Cemetery.

== Awards and decorations ==
Command pilot

Silver Star with bronze oak leaf cluster
Distinguished Flying Cross with silver and two bronze oak leaf clusters
Air Medal with three bronze oak leaf clusters
Air Force Presidential Unit Citation
American Campaign Medal
European-African-Middle Eastern Campaign Medal with two bronze campaign stars
World War II Victory Medal
National Defense Service Medal

Air Force Longevity Service Award

Armed Forces Reserve Medal with silver hourglass device

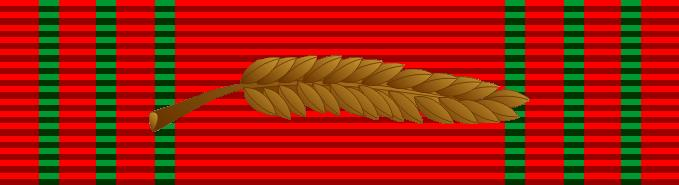
Croix de Guerre, with Palm (Belgium)
