= Felix D. Williamson =

Felix Drewry Williamson
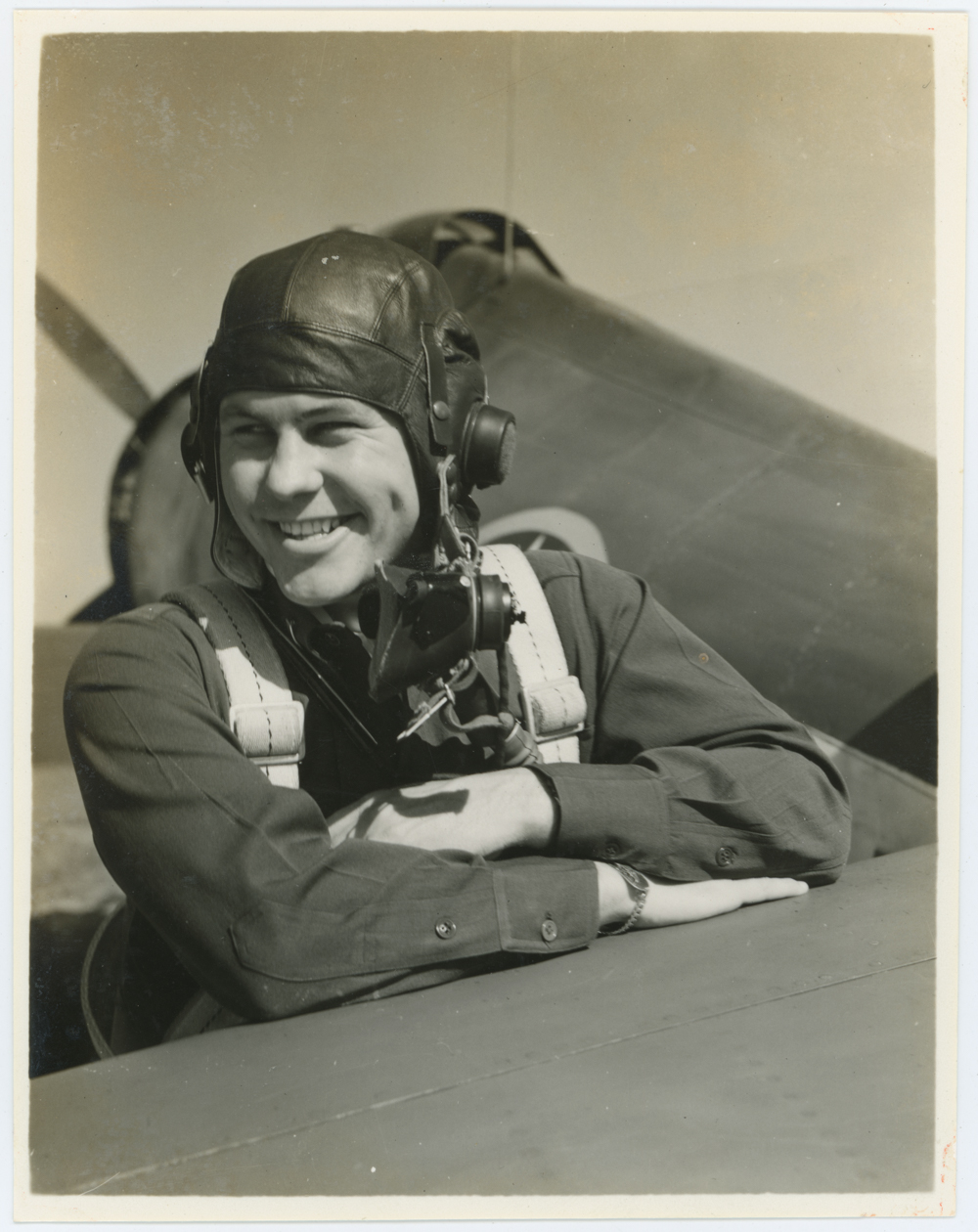
- Born: July 26, 1921; Crisp County, Georgia, US
- Died: January 24, 1947 (aged 25) March Field, California, US
- Buried: Penia Baptist Church Cemetery, Cordele, Georgia, US
- Allegiance: United States
- Branch: United States Army Air Forces
- Service years: 1941–1947
- Rank: Major
- Conflicts: World War II
- Awards: Distinguished Service Cross; Distinguished Flying Cross (4); Air Medal (11)

Felix Drewry Williamson (July 26, 1921 – January 24, 1947) was a United States Army Air Forces major. He was a flying ace credited with 13 aerial victories, including five in a single day, for which he was awarded the Distinguished Service Cross during World War II.

== Early life and career ==
Felix D. Williamson was born on July 26, 1921, in Crisp County, Georgia. Williamson enlisted into the United States Army in September 1941. He subsequently went to Fort Jackson, South Carolina, where he was transferred to the United States Army Air Forces.

== World War II flying ace ==
Williamson was soon assigned to the 62nd Fighter Squadron, 56th Fighter Group, Eight Air Force. Williamson's squadron was assigned to Royal Air Force Station Halesworth in Suffolk, England. The 62nd Fighter Squadron flew P-47 Thunderbolts in Europe, and Williamson named his aircraft "Georgia Peach." On November 29, 1943, First Lieutenant Williamson downed his first German plane, sharing a victory with a fellow fighter pilot.

On April 19, 1944, Captain Williamson's squadron moved to Royal Air Force Station Boxted in Essex, England. On December 23, 1944, Williamson downed two German planes, becoming an ace and bringing his total number of victories to six.

Captain Williamson claimed his next series of victories on January 14, 1945. On that date, he shot down five enemy planes during a single mission. For his actions, Williamson was awarded the Distinguished Service Cross.

On February 3, 1945, Williamson downed two more German planes, claiming his final victories and finished the war with 13 total kills. In addition to his Distinguished Service Cross, Williamson was awarded four Distinguished Flying Crosses and eleven Air Medals.

== Post-war and death ==
After the war, Williamson was promoted to major and was assigned to the 1st Fighter Group at March Field in Riverside County, California. At March Field, Williamson flew the United States' first operational fighter jet, the P-80 Shooting Star.

On January 24, 1947, Major Felix D. Williamson was killed in a mid-air collision with another P-80 pilot near March Field. He was buried at Penia Baptist Church Cemetery in Cordele, Georgia.

== Awards and decorations ==
His awards include:

USAAF Pilot Badge
Distinguished Service Cross
Distinguished Flying Cross with three bronze oak leaf clusters
Air Medal with two silver oak leaf clusters
American Defense Service Medal
American Campaign Medal
European-African-Middle Eastern Campaign Medal with silver and bronze campaign stars
World War II Victory Medal

Army Presidential Unit Citation with bronze oak leaf cluster

=== Distinguished Service Cross citation ===

Williamson, Felix D.
Captain, U.S. Army Air Forces
62d Fighter Squadron, 56th Fighter Group, Eighth Air force
Date of Action: January 14, 1945

Citation:

The President of the United States of America, authorized by Act of Congress July 9, 1918, presents the Distinguished Service Cross to Captain (Air Corps) Felix D. Williamson, United States Army Air Forces, for extraordinary heroism in connection with military operations against an armed enemy while serving as Pilot of a P-47 Fighter Airplane in the 62d Fighter Squadron, 56th Fighter Group, Eighth Air Force, in aerial combat against enemy forces on 14 January 1945, in the European Theater of Operations. On this date Captain Williamson became ACE in a day, shooting down five enemy aircraft in a single mission. Captain Williamson's unquestionable valor in aerial combat is in keeping with the highest traditions of the military service and reflects great credit upon himself, the 8th Air Force, and the United States Army Air Forces.
