= Eugene W. O'Neill Jr. =

Colonel in the United States Air Force

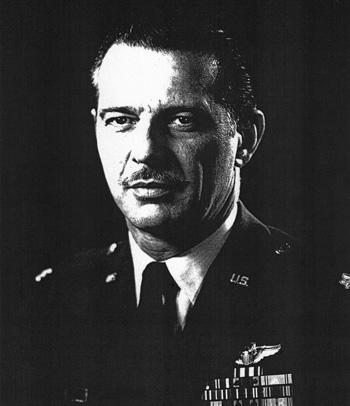
- Born: February 10, 1919; Jersey City, New Jersey, U.S.
- Died: August 30, 1998 (aged 79)
- Burial place: Arlington National Cemetery
- Military career
- Allegiance: United States of America
- Branch: United States Army Air Forces; United States Air Force
- Service years: 1941–1964
- Rank: Colonel
- Nickname: "Gene"
- Units: 62nd Fighter Squadron; 56th Fighter Group
- Commands: 7135th School Group; 7366th Combat Support Group; 19th Combat Support Group
- Conflicts: World War II
- Awards: Silver Star; Distinguished Flying Cross (3); Air Medal (4)

Eugene Walter O'Neill Jr. (February 10, 1919 – August 30, 1998) was a United States Air Force colonel and a flying ace, who was credited in destroying 5 enemy aircraft in aerial combat during World War II.

== Early life ==
O'Neill was born on February 10, 1919, in Jersey City, New Jersey.

== Military career ==
On April 25, 1941, he enlisted in the Aviation Cadet Program of the United States Army Air Corps. He was awarded his pilot wings and commissioned as a second lieutenant at Victoria Field in Texas on December 12, just five days after the Japanese attack on Pearl Harbor.

=== World War II ===
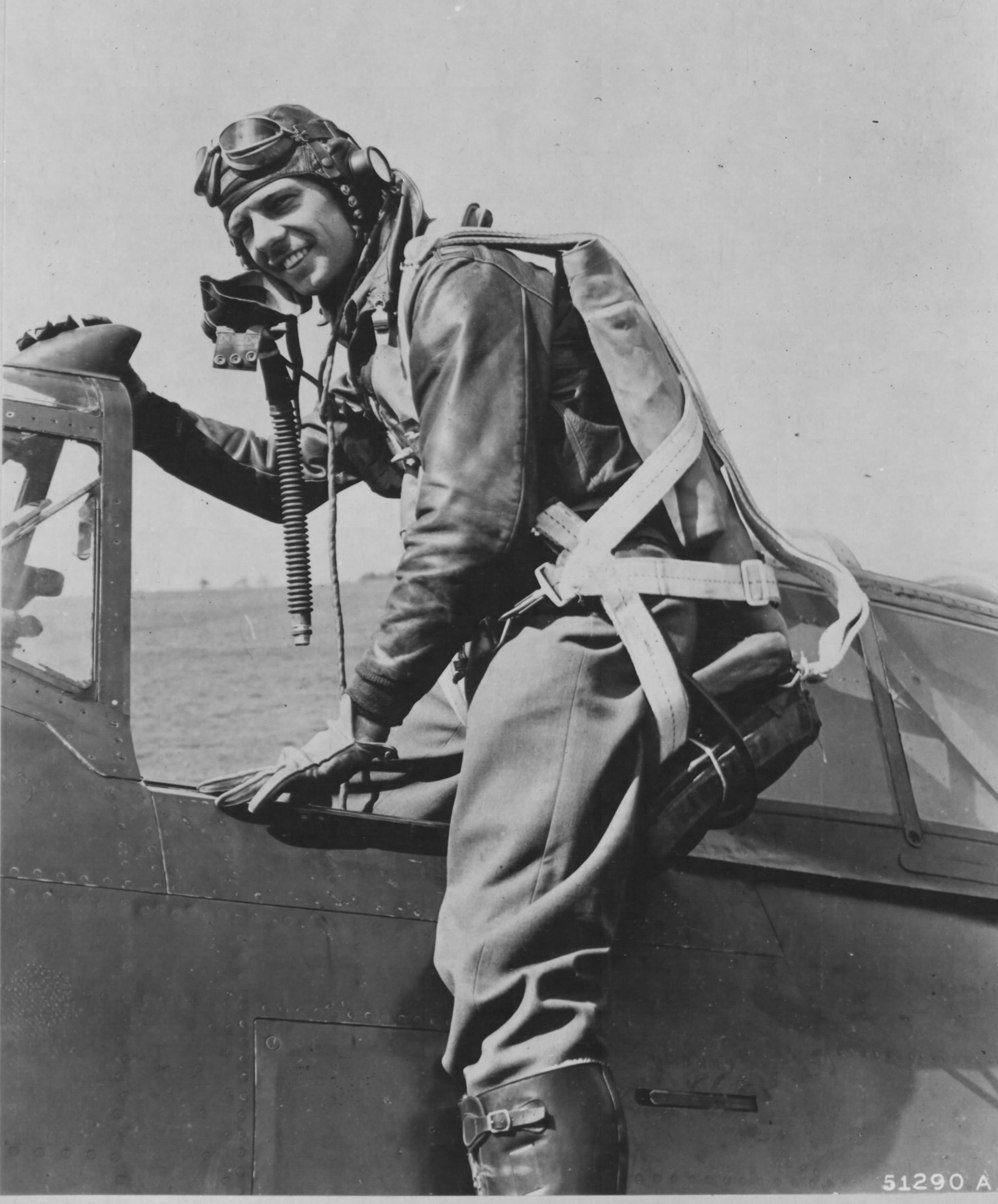
O'Neill onboard his P-47

Following the completion of flight training, he was assigned to the 62nd Pursuit Squadron of the 56th Pursuit Group. The unit later was renamed to the 62nd Fighter Squadron of the 56th Fighter Group and was equipped with the Republic P-47 Thunderbolt. He was deployed with the group to England in January 1943 and arrived at RAF Kings Cliffe in January 1943. Flying the P-47, he shot down his first enemy aircraft in aerial combat on November 11 and on November 26, he shot down two rocket-carrying Messerschmitt Bf 110s that was attempting to attack a formation of American bombers returning from a mission over Germany. He shot down his fourth enemy aircraft on December 20 and became a flying ace on February 6, 1944, after shooting down his fifth enemy aircraft.

During World War II, O'Neill flew 83 combat missions and was credited with the destruction of five enemy aircraft in aerial combat. After his return to the United States in April 1944, he was assigned to the First Air Force as a staff officer and later at the Pentagon.

=== Post war ===
After the end of World War II, O'Neill left active duty and joined the United States Air Force Reserve in 1947. After being recalled to active duty on January 10, 1951, he attended the Air Command and Staff School and Army Language School, and then served as a Tactical Advisor to the Peruvian Air Force from August 1952 to April 1956. After the completion of this assignment, O'Neill served as commander of Air Force support units based in Lindsey Air Station in West Germany, Chaumont Air Base in France and Homestead Air Force Base in Florida from June 1961 till his retirement from the Air Force on December 31, 1964. During his military career, he accumulated over 4,000 flying hours.

== Later life ==
O'Neill died on August 30, 1998, and was buried at Arlington National Cemetery.

== Awards and decorations ==
His awards include:

USAF Command pilot badge
| Silver Star |
| Distinguished Flying Cross with two bronze oak leaf clusters |
| Air Medal with three bronze oak leaf clusters |
| Air Force Commendation Medal |
| Air Force Presidential Unit Citation |
| American Defense Service Medal |
| American Campaign Medal |
| European-African-Middle Eastern Campaign Medal with bronze campaign star |
| World War II Victory Medal |
| National Defense Service Medal with bronze service star |
| Air Force Longevity Service Award with four bronze oak leaf clusters |
| Armed Forces Reserve Medal |

=== Silver Star citation ===
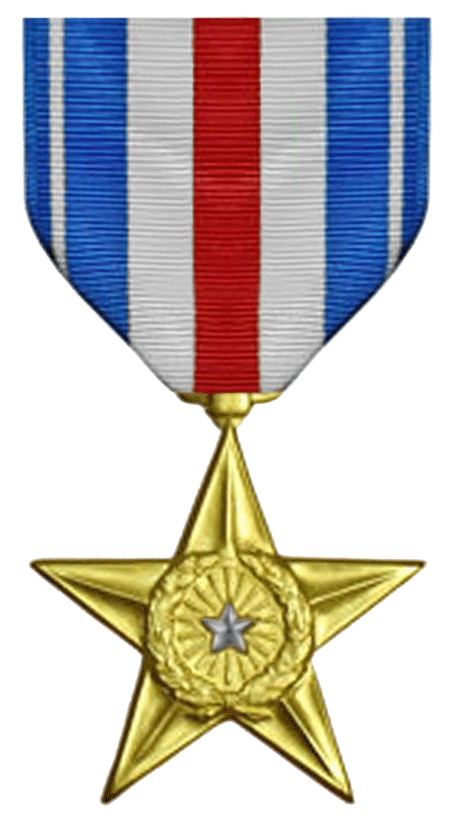

O'Neill Jr., Eugene W.
Captain, U.S. Army Air Forces
62nd Fighter Squadron, 56th Fighter Group, Eighth Air Force
Date of Action: 26 November 1943

Citation:

The President of the United States of America, authorized by Act of Congress July 9, 1918, takes pleasure in presenting the Silver Star to Captain (Air Corps) Eugene Walter O'Neill, Jr., United States Army Air Forces, for gallantry in action while serving as a Pilot of the 62nd Fighter Squadron, 56th Fighter Group, Eighth Air Force, while leading a Flight of P-47 fighter aircraft furnishing support for bombers withdrawing from a mission over Germany, 26 November 1943. As rendezvous was made with the bombers, a large force of rocket-carrying aircraft were observed preparing to attack the formation. In a furious aerial battle which ensued, Captain O'Neill engaged and destroyed one of the enemy planes, pressing his attack so close that pieces of the disintegrating plane damaged his own aircraft, knocking off a portion of the wing tip and damaging the tail assembly. In spite of this, Captain O'Neill, thinking only of the safety of the bombers, attacked and destroyed another enemy fighter that was vigorously attacking a straggling bomber. The gallantry, aggressive fighting spirit and exceptional skill displayed by Captain O'Neill contributed in a large measure to the successful withdrawal of the bomber formation.
