= 311th Fighter Squadron =

311th Fighter Squadron

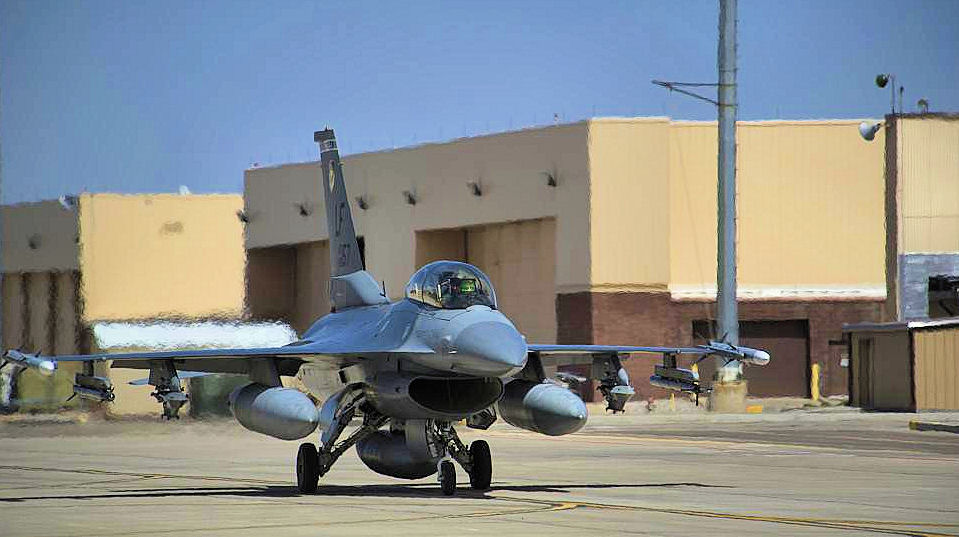
- 311th Fighter Squadron F-16 Fighting Falcon (Note: Aircraft is General Dynamics F-16D Block 42E Fighting Falcon serial 89-2157)
- Active: 1942–1946; 1952–1958; 1970–1994; 1995; 2014–present
- Country: United States
- Branch: United States Air Force
- Type: Fighter Training
- Part of: Air Combat Command
- Nickname: Sidewinders
- Engagements: American Theater (World War II); Asiatic-Pacific Theater; Korean War

- Decorations: Distinguished Unit Citation (2x); Air Force Outstanding Unit Award (7x); Presidential Unit Citation (Philippines); Republic of Korea Presidential Unit Citation

Commanders
- Notable commanders: Clarence L. Tinker

Insignia
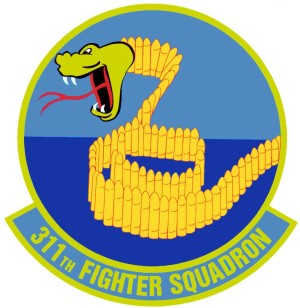
- 311th Fighter Squadron emblem (approved 18 July 1995)

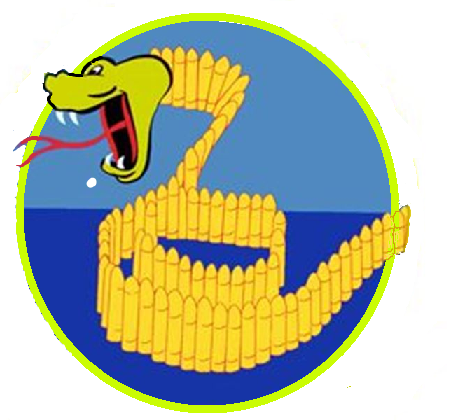
- 311th Fighter Squadron emblem (approved 9 October 1943)

The 311th Fighter Squadron (Sidewinders) is part of the 54th Fighter Group at Holloman Air Force Base, New Mexico. It operates the General Dynamics F-16 Fighting Falcon aircraft conducting advanced fighter training. The squadron previously operated the Fighting Falcon conducting advanced fighter training at Luke and was inactivated due to budget constraints after the end of the Cold War. It was recently reactivated at Holloman and the aircraft were received from the 309th Fighter Squadron.

The squadron was first activated during World War II to replace the 67th Fighter Squadron, which had been withdrawn from the 58th Fighter Group. After training in the United States, it moved to the Southwest Pacific Theater, earning a Distinguished Unit Citation and a Republic of the Philippines Presidential Unit Citation before inactivating in the Philippines in 1946. It was activated again in July 1952, when it replaced an Air National Guard unit that had been federalized for the Korean War. It earned a Republic of Korea Presidential Unit Citation before the armistice ended combat and remained in Korea until inactivating in 1958.

== History ==
=== World War II ===
The 311th Fighter Squadron was constituted on 21 January 1942, as the 311th Pursuit Squadron (Interceptor) and was activated on 9 February at Harding Field, Louisiana, where it flew the Bell P-39 Airacobra and Curtiss P-40 Warhawk aircraft. During 1942 and early 1943 the squadron was both an Operational and a Replacement Training Unit initially under III Fighter Command, being reassigned to I Fighter Command in October 1942. Also was part of the air defense of the Northeast United States, being a component of several air defense fighter wings (Philadelphia, New York, Boston), under First Air Force.

Was converted into an operational squadron in March 1943 at Bradley Field, Connecticut, being re-equipped with Republic P-47 Thunderbolts. Was deployed to the Southwest Pacific Theater, being assigned to Fifth Air Force in Australia in November 1943. Began combat operations in February 1944, providing protection for U.S. bases and escorting transports initially, then escorting bombers over New Guinea and sea convoys to Admiralty Islands. From Noemfoor, bombed and strafed Japanese airfields and installations on Ceram, Halmahera, and the Kai Islands.

Moved to the Philippines in Nov, flew fighter sweeps against enemy airfields, supported U.S. ground forces, and protected sea convoys and transport routes. Beginning in July 1945, attacked railways, airfields, and enemy installations in Korea and Kyushu, Japan from Okinawa. After V-J Day, flew reconnaissance missions over Japan. Moved without personnel or equipment to the Philippines in Dec to be inactivated in January 1946 at Fort William McKinley, Luzon.

=== Cold War ===
Reactivated during the Korean War at Taegu Air Base, South Korea, being redesignated the 311th Fighter-Bomber Squadron. First equipped with the Republic F-84G Thunderjet, the squadron adopted the North American F-86 Sabre in 1954 and kept it through 1958. During the Korean War, the squadron flew primarily air-to-ground missions supporting ground operations. The 311th participated in the Korea Summer-Fall 1952, Third Korean Winter, and Korean Summer-Fall 1953 campaigns, the squadron again distinguished itself, earning the Republic of Korea Presidential Unit Citation.

After the armistice in 1953, the squadron was moved to Osan Air Base on 19 March 1955. Remained in South Korea to provide deterrence against any armistice violations by North Korea. Inactivated 1 July 1958 due to budget restraints.

=== Pilot training ===
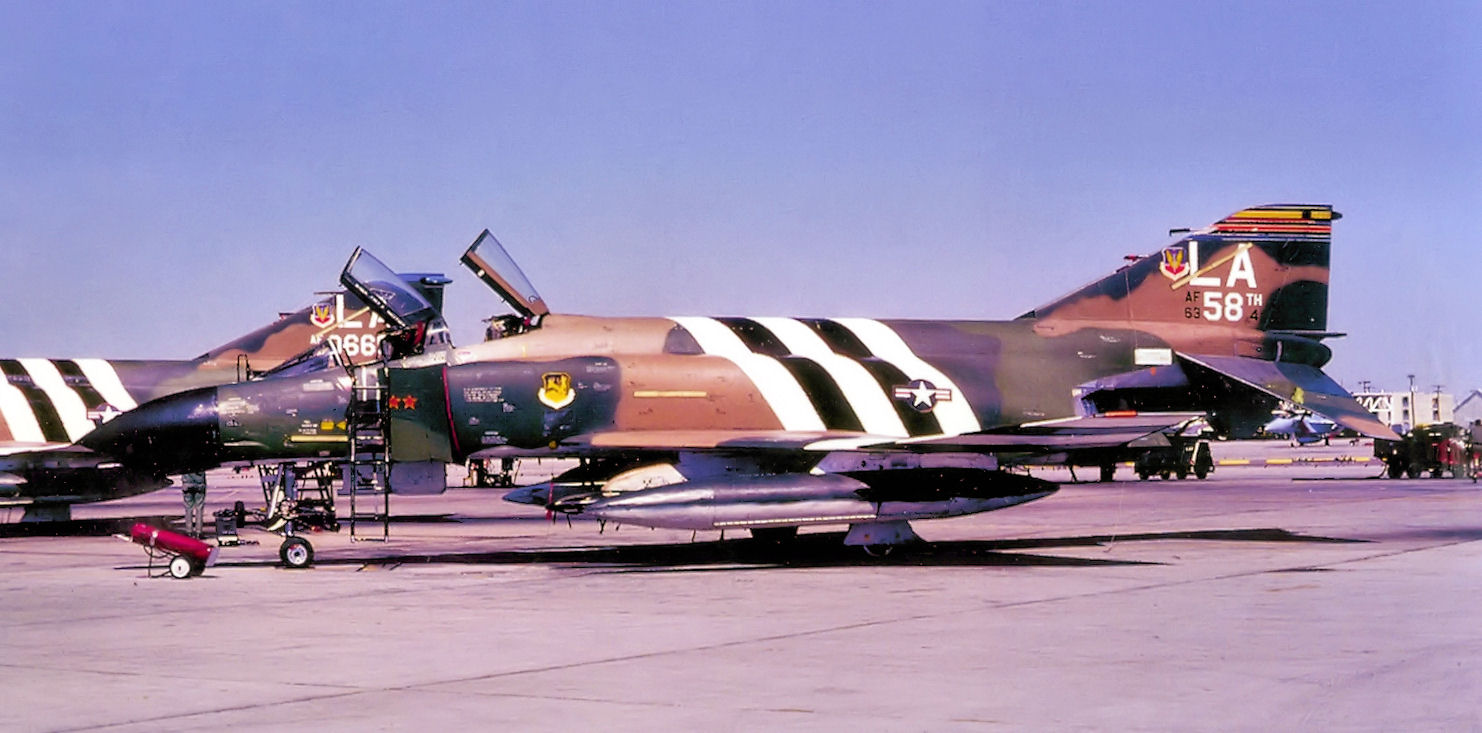
311th TFTS F-4C-19-MC Phantom 63–7584, marked as Wing Commander's aircraft. Now at McChord Air Museum, Washington.

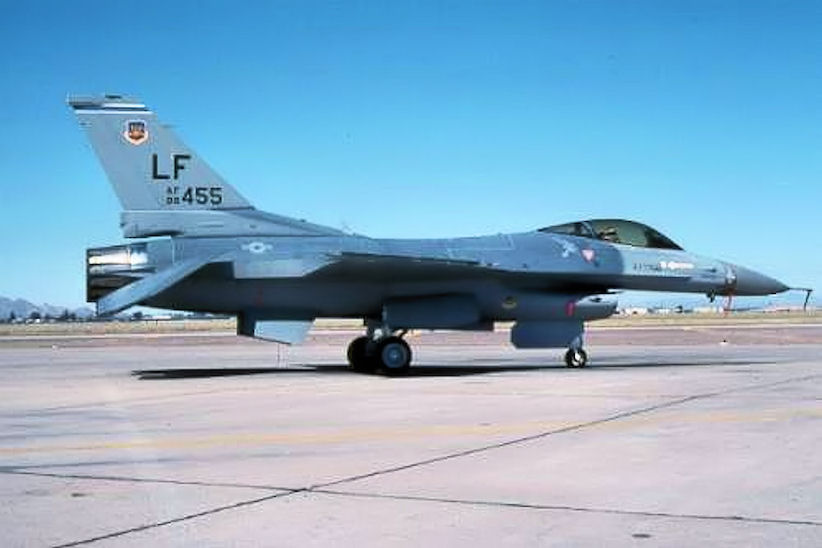
311th TFTS F-16C Block 30A Fighting Falcon 85-1455

Reactivated in January 1970 as the 311th Tactical Fighter Training Squadron, assuming personnel and equipment of the provisional 4515th Combat Crew Training Squadron, carried tail code "LA" with yellow fin cap. Initially operated the F-100D Super Sabres of the 4515th CCTS, re-equipped with the McDonnell F-4C Phantom II in August 1971, performing F-4 pilot training role previously performed by Davis–Monthan AFB units.

Re-equipped with Block 1, 5 and 10 F-16A/B Fighting Falcon aircraft in late 1982. F-16s carried tail code "LF". In 1988 the squadron began receiving brand new block 42 F-16C/Ds to replace the F-16A/B. Inactivated 1 April 1994 with the phase down of combat training at Luke after the end of the Cold War.

Reactivated in January 1995 with F-16C/D block 42s to train Foreign Military Sales customers, mission and aircraft reassigned to the 152d Fighter Squadron, Arizona Air National Guard at Tucson Air National Guard Base and inactivated late September 1995

The 311th Fighter Squadron was reactivated in 2014 as a part of the also newly reactivated 54th Fighter Group. The group is an element of the 56th Fighter Wing at Luke Air Force Base, Arizona.

== Lineage ==
- Constituted as the 311th Pursuit Squadron (Interceptor) on 21 January 1942

Activated on 9 February 1942
Redesignated 311th Fighter Squadron on 15 May 1942
Redesignated 311th Fighter Squadron, Single Engine on 20 August 1943
Inactivated on 20 February 1946

- Redesignated 311th Fighter-Bomber Squadron on 25 June 1952

Activated on 10 July 1952
Inactivated on 1 July 1958

- Redesignated 311th Tactical Fighter Training Squadron on 12 January 1970

Activated on 18 January 1970
Redesignated 311th Fighter Squadron on 1 November 1991
Inactivated on 1 April 1994

- Activated on 1 January 1995

Inactivated on 1 December 1995

- Activated on 1 March 2014

=== Assignments ===
- 58th Pursuit Group (later 58th Fighter Group), 9 February 1942
- Fifth Air Force, 27 January 1946 – 20 February 1946
- 58th Fighter-Bomber Group, 10 July 1952 (attached to 58th Fighter-Bomber Wing after 1 March 1957)
- 58th Fighter-Bomber Wing, 8 November 1957 – 1 July 1958
- 58th Tactical Fighter Training Wing (later 58th Tactical Training Wing), 18 January 1970
- 58th Operations Group, 1 October 1991 – 1 April 1994
- 56th Operations Group, 1 January–1 December 1995
- 54th Fighter Group, 1 March 2014 – present

=== Stations ===
- Harding Field, Louisiana, 9 February 1942
- Dale Mabry Field, Florida, 4 March 1942
- Richmond Army Air Base, Virginia, 16 October 1942
- Bolling Field, District of Columbia, 23 October 1942
- Bradley Field, Connecticut, 1 March 1943
- Hillsgrove Army Air Field, Rhode Island, 1 May 1943
- Grenier Field, New Hampshire, 15 September–22 October 1943
- Archerfield Airport, Australia, 21 November 1943
- Dobodura Airfield, New Guinea, 28 December 1943
- Saidor Airfield, New Guinea, 5 April 1944
- Kornasoren Airfield, Noemfoor, Schouten Islands, New Guinea, 30 August 1944
- San Roque Airfield, Leyte, Philippines, (1944)
- McGuire Field, Mindoro, Philippines, 21 December 1944
- Mangaldan Airfield, Luzon, Philippines, 7 April 1945
- Porac Airfield, Luzon, Philippines, 17 April 1945
- Ie Shima Airfield, Ryuku Islands, 10 July 1945
- Itazuke Air Base, Japan, 26 October 1945
- Fort William McKinley, Luzon, Philippines, 28 December 1945 – 27 January 1946
- Taegu Air Base, South Korea, 10 July 1952
- Osan Air Base, South Korea, 15 March 1955 – 1 July 1958
- Luke Air Force Base, Arizona, 12 January 1970 – 1 April 1994
- Luke Air Force Base, Arizona, 1 January–1 December 1995
- Holloman Air Force Base, New Mexico, 1 March 2014 – present

=== Aircraft ===
- Bell P-39 Airacobra (1942)
- Curtiss P-40 Warhawk (1942–1943)
- Republic P-47 Thunderbolt (1943–1945)
- Republic F-84 Thunderjet (1952–1954)
- North American F-86 Sabre (1954–1958)
- North American F-100 Super Sabre (1970–1971)
- McDonnell F-4 Phantom II (1970–1983)
- General Dynamics F-16 Fighting Falcon (1982–1994,2014– )
