= 62nd Fighter Squadron =

US Air Force unit

62d Fighter Squadron

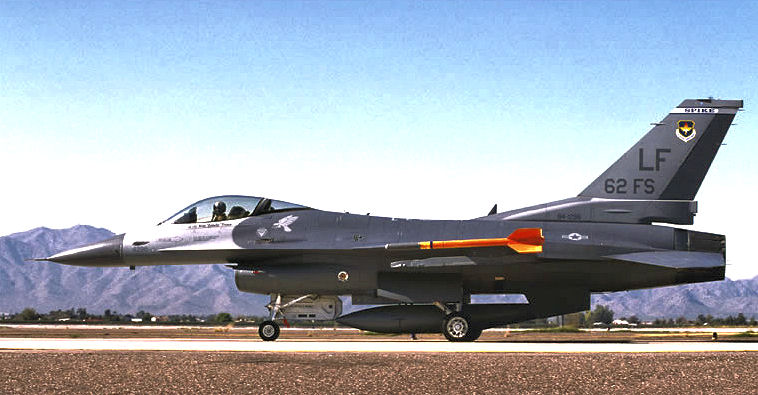
- F-16 Fighting Falcon of the 62d Fighter Squadron ready for takeoff at Luke AFB
- Active: 1941–1945; 1946–1971; 1974–1993; 1994–present
- Country: United States
- Branch: United States Air Force
- Role: Fighter Training
- Part of: Air Combat Command
- Garrison/HQ: Luke Air Force Base, Arizona
- Nickname: Spike War Dawgs
- Engagements: European Theater of Operations
- Decorations: Distinguished Unit Citation; Air Force Outstanding Unit Award

Insignia
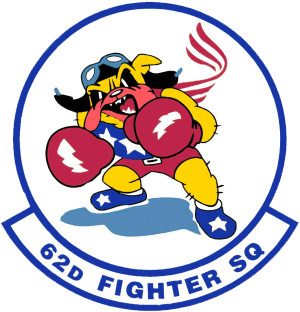
- 62d Fighter Squadron emblem (approved 18 June 1943) disc added later.

The 62d Fighter Squadron is part of the United States Air Force 56th Operations Group at Luke Air Force Base, Arizona. It operates the Lockheed Martin F-35A Lightning II aircraft conducting advanced fighter training. The fighter squadron currently operates in a joint effort alongside Lockheed Martin maintenance contractors to train pilots from several JSF program partners, primarily US, Norway & Italy.The chant for the squadron is "Spike! Put 'em up!" in reference to the squadron mascot Spike, a boxing bulldog. The mascot was designed by Disney as a part of early war support.

== Mission ==
The 62d Fighter Squadron ("Spikes", Tailband: White & Blue) operates the Lockheed Martin F-35A Lightning II, conducting pilot training for active duty USAF pilots.

== History ==
=== World War II ===
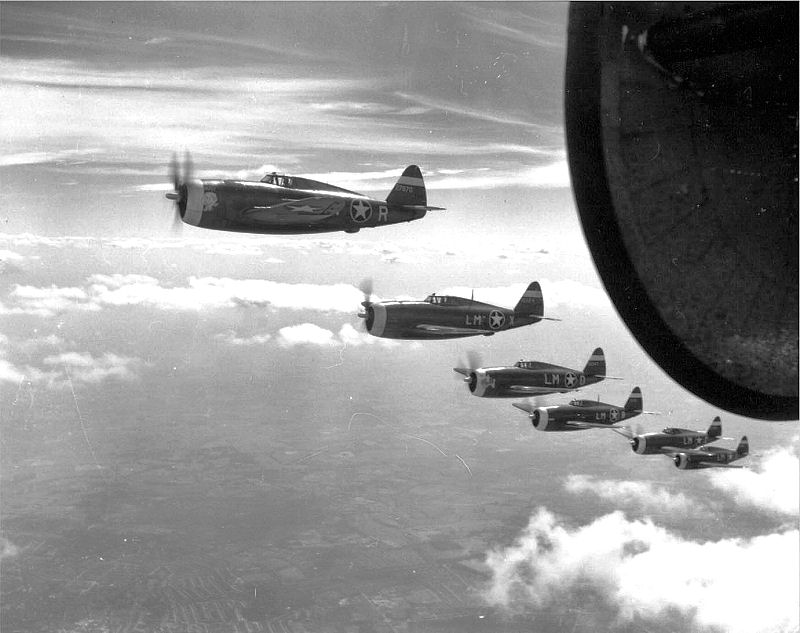
62d Fighter Squadron P-47 Thunderbolts on an escort mission, 1943

The 62d Fighter Squadron was activated as the 62d Pursuit Squadron, one of the original three squadrons of the 56th Pursuit Group at Army Air Base Savannah, Georgia, on 15 January 1941. The squadron immediately began training for its wartime missions under III Fighter Command, rapidly transitioning through the Seversky P-35, Curtiss P-36, Bell P-39 Airacobra, and Curtiss P-40 Warhawk aircraft. On 7 December 1941, the 62d stepped up to defend the Northeastern United States from anticipated enemy air attack while it converted to the Republic P-47 Thunderbolt and prepared to deploy overseas, operating under the I Fighter Command, New York Fighter Wing in the early months of 1942.

It was redesignated 62d Fighter Squadron on 15 May 1942, and deployed to RAF Kings Cliffe, England on 9 January 1943. It was declared operationally ready two months later and flew its first combat missions 13 April. The squadron was given fuselage code "LM" and operated from several RAF stations during the war, flying the P-47 Thunderbolt as an VIII Fighter Command bomber-escort unit for Boeing B-17 Flying Fortresses and beginning in 1944 for Consolidated B-24 Liberators attacking enemy targets in Occupied Europe. After the end of the war in Europe, the squadron was inactivated on 18 October 1945.

=== Strategic Fighter Escort Squadron ===
The squadron was reactivated on 1 May 1946 as a Strategic Air Command (SAC) escort fighter group, being assigned to Fifteenth Air Force at Selfridge Field, Michigan, equipped with long-range North American P-51H Mustangs that had been developed for Twentieth Air Force bomber escort missions in the Pacific Theater. The mission of the squadron was to provide fighter escort of SAC's Boeing B-29 Superfortress bombers on intercontinental strategic bombardment missions, deploying to Alaska and Europe in this role. In 1947, the squadron was upgraded to Lockheed P-80C Shooting Stars, as SAC introduced the Boeing B-50 Superfortress in the late 1940s. The squadron trained to maintain proficiency as a mobile strike force; including bomber escort mission until transferred from Strategic Air Command to Continental Air Command on 1 December 1948.

=== Air Defense Command ===
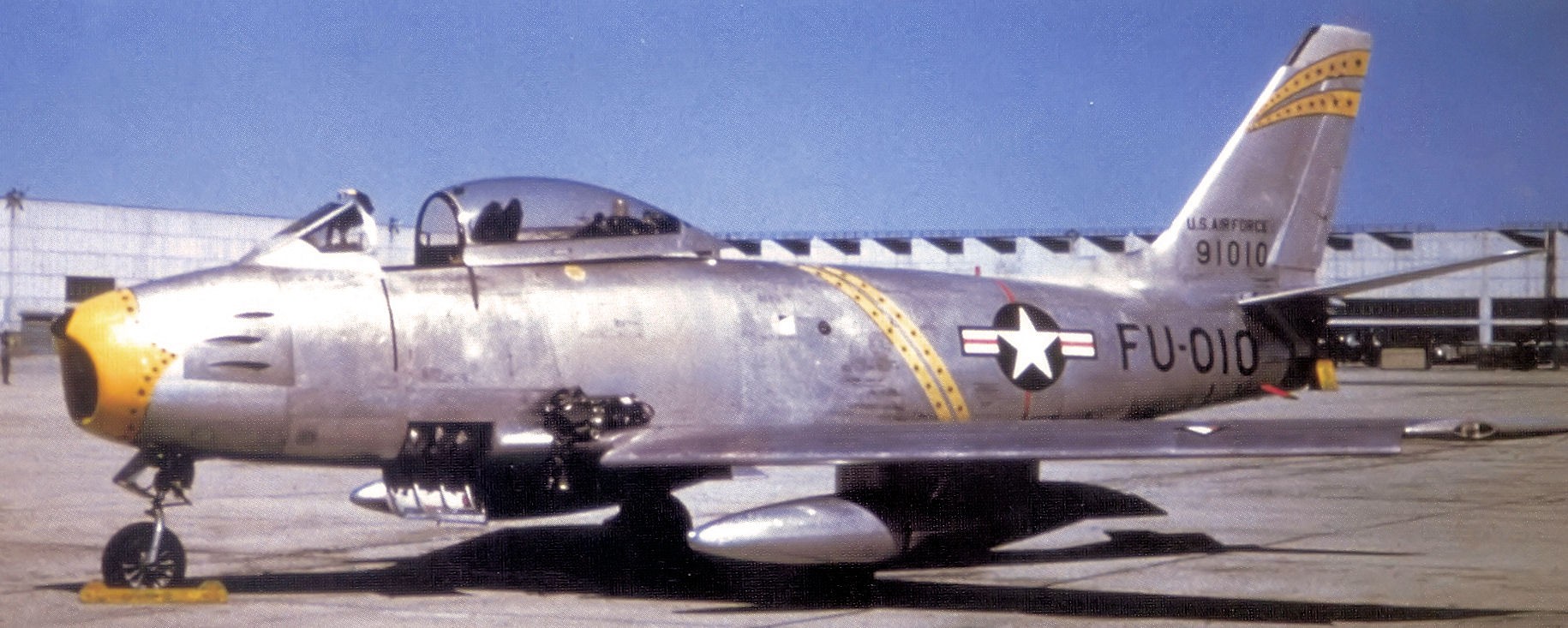
62d Fighter-Interceptor Squadron F-86A Sabre at O'Hare International Airport in 1951 (Note: Aircraft is North American F-86A Sabre serial 49-1010.)

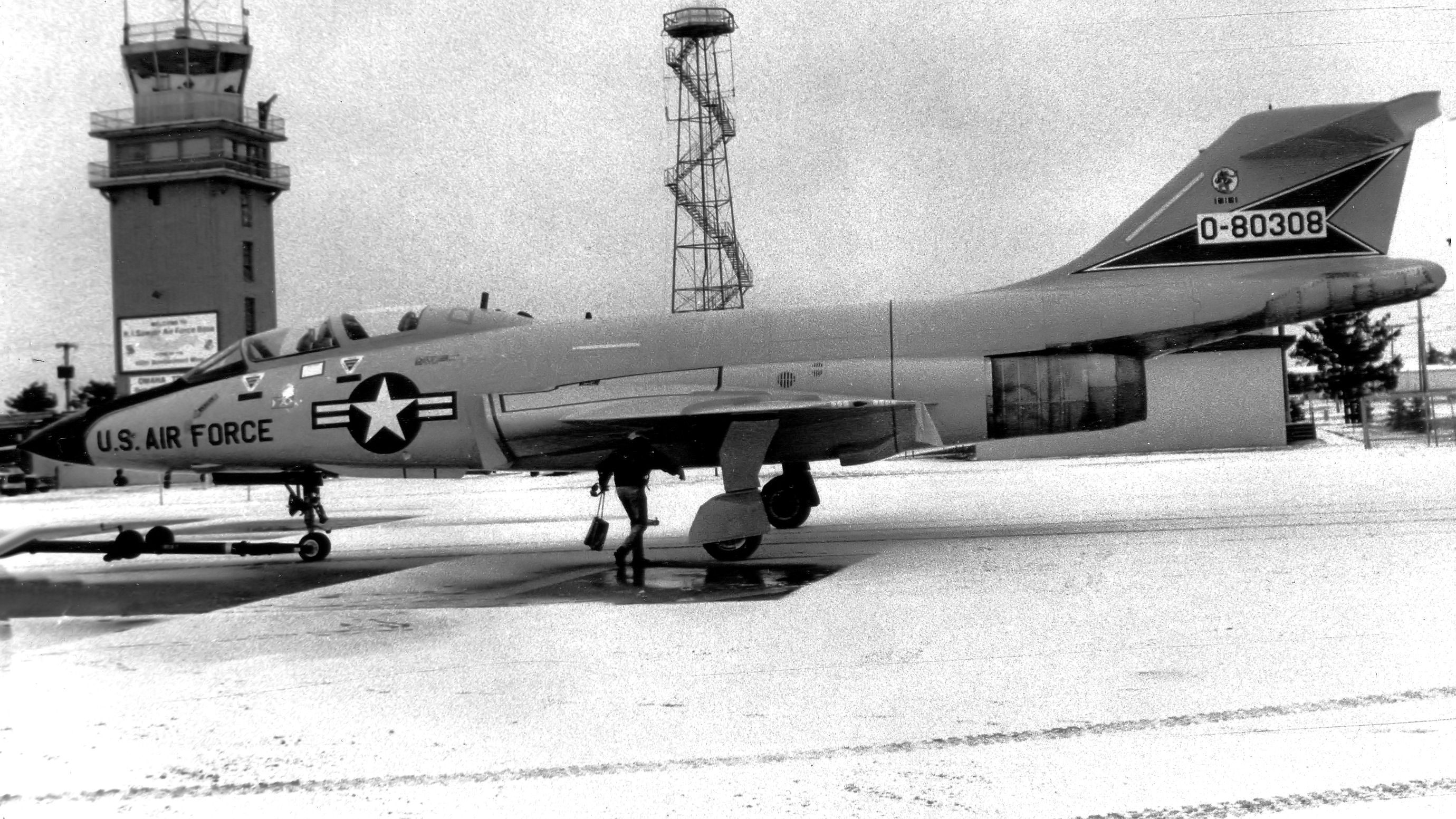
62d Fighter-Interceptor Squadron F-101B Voodoo at K. I. Sawyer AFB in 1969 (Note: Aircraft is McDonnell F-101B-MC Voodoo serial 58-308.)

The squadron began performing air defense missions in 1950 with its relocation to O'Hare International Airport, Chicago in 1950. It was redesignated as the 62d Fighter-Interceptor Squadron on 20 January 1950, and re-equipped with the North American F-86D Sabre. It was assigned to Air Defense Command 4706th Defense Wing in February 1952. In 1955, the 56th was reactivated under ADC as an Air Defense Group with the 62d being a tactical interceptor squadron.

In 1959 with interceptors being moved from O'Hare the squadron moved to K.I. Sawyer Air Force Base, Michigan, and the 62d was re-equipped with the Mach 2+ McDonnell F-101B Voodoo two-seat interceptor. The F-101B proved to be a quite successful interceptor. assigned alongside the F-101B interceptor was the F-101F operational and conversion trainer. The two-seat trainer version was equipped with dual controls, but carried the same armament as the F-101B and were fully combat-capable.

The squadron maintained alert against the ever-present Soviet bomber threat.

On 22 October 1962, before President John F. Kennedy told Americans that missiles were in place in Cuba, the squadron dispersed one third of its force, equipped with nuclear tipped missiles to Phelps Collins Air National Guard Base at the start of the Cuban Missile Crisis. These planes returned to K.I. Sawyer after the crisis.

A highlight from this era was the squadron capturing top F-101 squadron honors at the William Tell 1965, USAF Worldwide Weapons Meet. The squadron maintained the air defense alert until it was inactivated on 30 April 1970, with its aircraft being passed along to the Air National Guard. The 62d was the last active-duty squadron equipped with the F-101B. The squadron was replaced by the 87th Fighter-Interceptor Squadron flying Convair F-106A Delta Darts

=== Tactical Air Command ===
On 1 September 1974, the 62d was reactivated at Tyndall Air Force Base, Florida, as a fighter training unit. The squadron assumed the mission of training McDonnell F-4E Phantom II and Convair F-106 Delta Dart weapons instructors at the United States Air Force Interceptor Weapons School. The following October, the squadron moved again, this time to rejoin the 56th Tactical Fighter Wing at MacDill Air Force Base, Florida, and began training F-4 crews for tactical units around the world. 62d aircraft carried a blue fin cap, tail coded "MC". In April 1978, the squadron changed equipment to the F-4D, with the "E" models being transferred to operational squadrons.

The last F-4D flight occurred on 14 November 1980, and conversion began to the General Dynamics F-16A Fighting Falcon began that month. On 1 January 1981, the squadron transitioned to the Fighting Falcon and the squadron was redesignated as the 62d Tactical Fighter Training Squadron. Beginning in June 1989 the unit converted to the Block 30 model of the F-16C and F-16D. On 1 November 1991 the squadron was once again redesignated back to what it was in World War II as the 62d Fighter Squadron with the adoption of the objective organization plan by the wing.

=== Move and transfer to training command ===
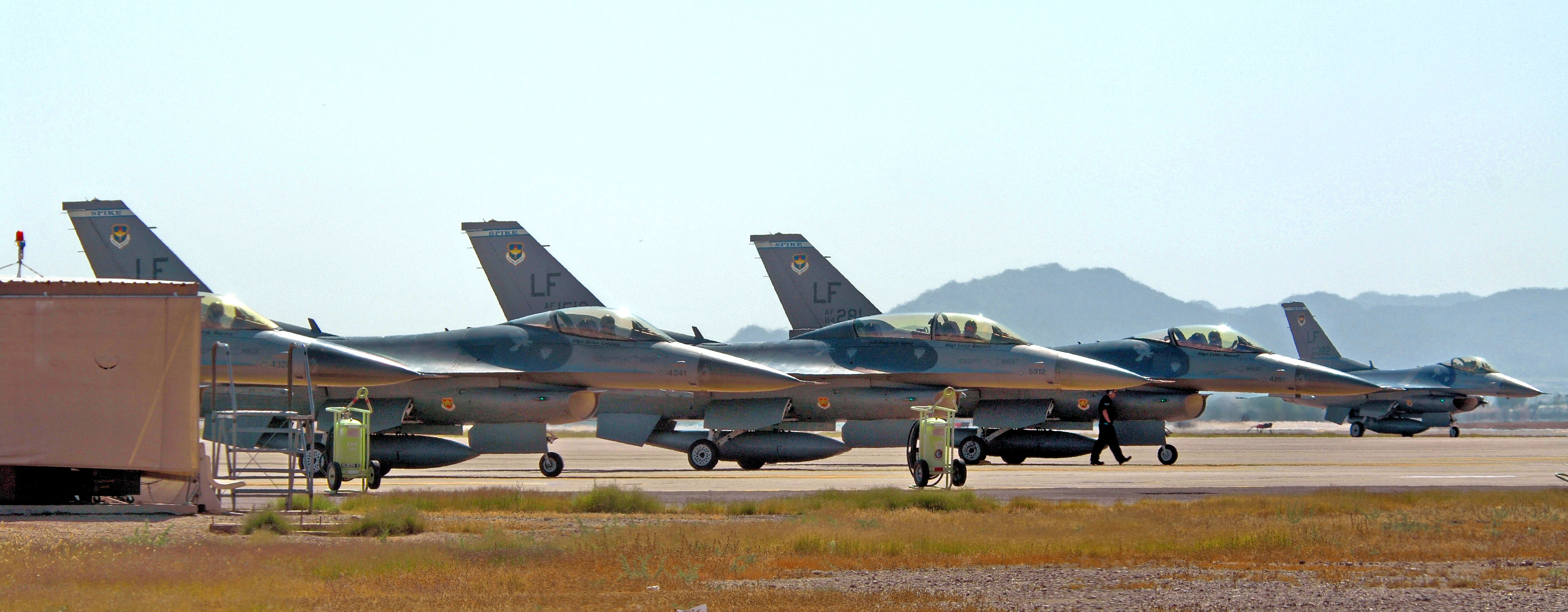
Parking ramp of the 62d FS at Luke

With the end of the Cold War in the early 1990s it was announced that MacDill would close. The squadrons of the 56th Fighter Wing would be inactivated starting with the 72d Fighter Squadron sequentially from the highest numbered to the lowest, the 61st Fighter Squadron. Therefore, the 62d Fighter Squadron was second to last to inactivate. The squadron, however, continued to train fighter pilots until its inactivation on 12 May 1993 to prepare for the move to Luke Air Force Base, Arizona where it would continue as an F-16 training squadron.

The squadron was able to reactivate at Luke on 18 March 1994. Pilot training for students assigned to the 62d is a standard syllabus, one that gets students their first look at the F-16 and prepare them for service with active duty units. The squadron's mission is to "Graduate flight pilots who meet or exceed syllabus standards and their gaining units' expectations. Teach the B-course students what it means to be a fighter pilot. Actively promote quality of life and provide opportunities for personal and professional growth."

== Lineage ==
- Constituted as the 62d Pursuit Squadron (Interceptor) on 20 November 1940

Activated on 15 January 1941
Redesignated 62d Pursuit Squadron (Interceptor) (Twin Engine) on 31 January 1942
Redesignated 62d Fighter Squadron (Twin Engine) on 15 May 1942
Redesignated 62d Fighter Squadron on 1 June 1942
Redesignated 62d Fighter Squadron, Single Engine on 28 February 1944
Inactivated on 18 October 1945

- Activated on 1 May 1946

Redesignated 62d Fighter Squadron, Jet Propelled on 24 April 1947
Redesignated 62d Fighter Squadron, Jet on 14 Jun 1948
Redesignated 62d Fighter-Interceptor Squadron on 20 January 1950
Inactivated on 30 April 1971

- Redesignated 62d Fighter-Interceptor Training Squadron on 15 August 1974

Activated on 1 September 1974
Redesignated 62d Tactical Fighter Squadron on 30 June 1975
Redesignated 62d Tactical Fighter Training Squadron on 1 January 1981
Redesignated 62d Fighter Squadron on 1 November 1991
Inactivated on 14 May 1993

- Activated on 18 March 1994

=== Assignments ===
- 56th Pursuit Group (later 56th Fighter Group), 15 January 1941 – 18 October 1945
- 56th Fighter Grlup (later 56th Fighter-Interceptor Group), 1 May 1946 (attached to Alaskan Provisional Wing, c. 28 December 1946 – c. 10 April 1947; 30th Air Division, c. 28 July 1950 – 30 April 1951, 142d Fighter Interceptor Group, 1 May 1951 – 5 February 1952)
- 4706th Defense Wing, 6 February 1952
- 501st Air Defense Group, 16 February 1953
- 56th Fighter Group, 18 August 1955 (attached to 473d Fighter Group, 1 August–30 September 1959)
- 56th Fighter Wing, 1 February 1961
- Duluth Air Defense Sector, 16 December 1963
- 29th Air Division, 1 April 1966
- 34th Air Division, 15 September 1969
- 29th Air Division, 14 November 1969
- 23d Air Division, 19 November 1969 – 30 April 1971
- Air Defense Weapons Center, 1 September 1974
- 56th Tactical Fighter Wing (later 56th Tactical Training Wing, 56th Fighter Wing), 30 June 1975
- 56th Operations Group, 1 November 1991 – 14 May 1993
- 58th Operations Group, 18 March 1994
- 56th Operations Group, 1 April 1994 – present

=== Stations ===
- Army Air Base, Savannah, Georgia, 15 January 1941
- Charlotte Army Air Base, North Carolina, 26 May 1941 (deployed to Myrtle Beach Municipal Airport, South Carolina October - November 1941)
- Bluethenthal Field, North Carolina, 10 December 1941
- Bendix Airport, New Jersey, 17 January 1942
- Newark Army Air Base, New Jersey, 31 May 1942
- Bradley Field, Connecticut, 23 July-27 December 1942
- RAF Kings Cliffe (AAF-367), England, 12 January 1943
- RAF Horsham St Faith (AAF-123), England, 5 April 1943
- RAF Halesworth (AAF-365), England, 9 July 1943
- RAF Boxted (AAF-150), England, 19 April 1944
- RAF Debden (AAF-356), England, 15 September-11 October 1945
- Camp Kilmer, New Jersey, 16–18 October 1945
- Selfridge Field (later Selfridge Air Force Base), Michigan, 1 May 1946 (deployed to Ladd Field, Alaska 28 December 1946 – 10 April 1947, Oscoda Air Force Base, Michigan 1 April – 6 June 1949)
- O'Hare Field-Chicago International Aprt (later O'Hare International Airport), IL, 4 August 1950 (deployed at K. I. Sawyer Air Force Base, Michigan after 1 August 1959)
- K. I. Sawyer Air Force Base, Michigan, 1 October 1959 – 30 April 1971
- Tyndall Air Force Base, Florida, 1 September 1974
- MacDill Air Force Base, Florida, 30 June 1975 – 14 May 1993
- Luke Air Force Base, Arizona, 18 March 1994 – present

=== Aircraft ===
- Seversky P-35 (1941)
- Curtiss P-36 Hawk (1941–1942)
- Bell P-39 Airacobra (1941–1942)
- Curtiss P-40 Warhawk (1941–1942)
- Republic P-47 Thunderbolt (1942–1945, 1946)
- North American P-51 Mustang (1946–1947)
- Lockheed F-80 Shooting Star (1947–1950)
- North American F-86A Sabre, (1951–1953)
- North American F-86D Sabre (1953–1959)
- McDonnell F-101B Voodoo (1959–1971)
- Convair F-106 Delta Dart (1974–1975)
- McDonnell F-4 Phantom II (1974–1980)
- General Dynamics F-16 Fighting Falcon (1980–1993, 1994–2015)
- Lockheed Martin F-35 Lightning II (2015–present)
