= 58th Operations Group =

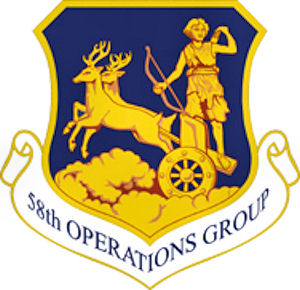
- Emblem of the 58th Operations Group
- Active: 1941–1945; 1946–1952; 1955–1961; 1991–1994; 1994–present
- Country: United States
- Branch: United States Air Force
- Role: Special Operations
- Engagements: World War II; Korean War

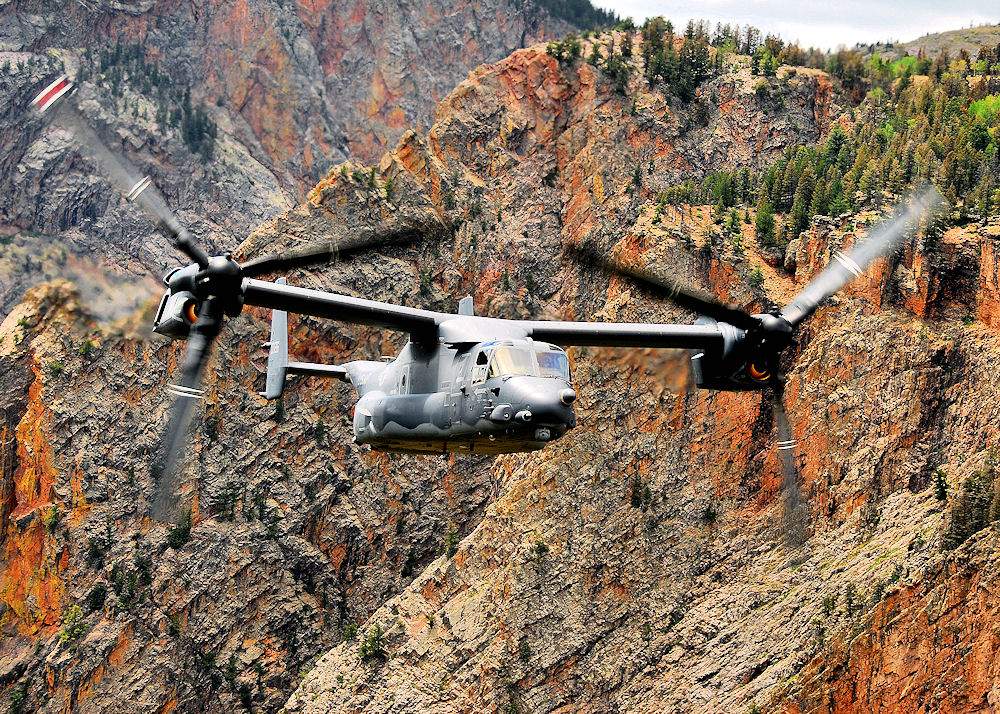
58 SOW Boeing CV-22B Osprey 04-0026

The 58th Operations Group (58 OG) is the operational flying component of the United States Air Force 58th Special Operations Wing. It is stationed at Kirtland Air Force Base, New Mexico.

During World War II, the units predecessor unit, the 58th Fighter Group operated primarily in the Southwest Pacific Theater as part of Fifth Air Force. The unit received a Distinguished Unit Citation strafing a Japanese naval force off Mindoro in the Philippines on 26 December 1944 to prevent destruction. During the Korean War, the unit bombed and strafed enemy airfields and installations and supported UN ground forces, remaining in South Korea after the 1953 Armistice.

== Overview ==
The 58 OG trains mission-ready special operations, combat search and rescue (CSAR) and airlift aircrews in the UH-1H/N, HH-60G, HC-130N/P, MC-130P, MC-130H, CV-22 and corresponding simulators; provides Specialized Undergraduate Pilot Training-Helicopter; conducts special operations and CSAR intelligence training; responds to contingencies and humanitarian missions.

Its component squadrons are:

- 23d Flying Training Squadron (23 FTS) (TH-1H) (Fort Novosel, AL)
- 36th Rescue Squadron (36th RQS) (UH-1N) (Fairchild AFB, WA)
- 71st Special Operations Squadron (CV-22 Osprey)
- 512th Rescue Squadron (UH-1N & HH-60G)
- 415th Special Operations Squadron (HC-130J Combat King II & MC-130J Commando II)
- 58th Operations Support Squadron
- 58th Training Squadron

== History ==
For additional history and lineage, see 58th Special Operations Wing

Established as 58th Pursuit Group (Interceptor) on 20 Nov 1940. From beginning of World War II until 1943, served as replacement training unit for fighter pilots. Trained for combat and moved overseas to Southwest Pacific Theater in 1943. Began combat operations in February 1944, providing protection for U.S. bases and escorting transports initially, then escorting bombers over New Guinea and sea convoys to Admiralty Islands. From Noemfoor, bombed and strafed Japanese airfields and installations on Ceram, Halmahera, and the Kai Islands.

Moved to the Philippines in Nov, flew fighter sweeps against enemy airfields, supported U.S. ground forces, and protected sea convoys and transport routes. Earned a Distinguished Unit Citation for strafing a Japanese naval force that was attacking a U.S. base on Mindoro on 26 December 1944. Beginning in July 1945, attacked railways, airfields, and enemy installations in Korea and Kyushu, Japan from Okinawa.

After V-J Day, flew reconnaissance missions over Japan. Moved without personnel or equipment to the Philippines in Dec to be inactivated in January 1946.

=== Korean War ===
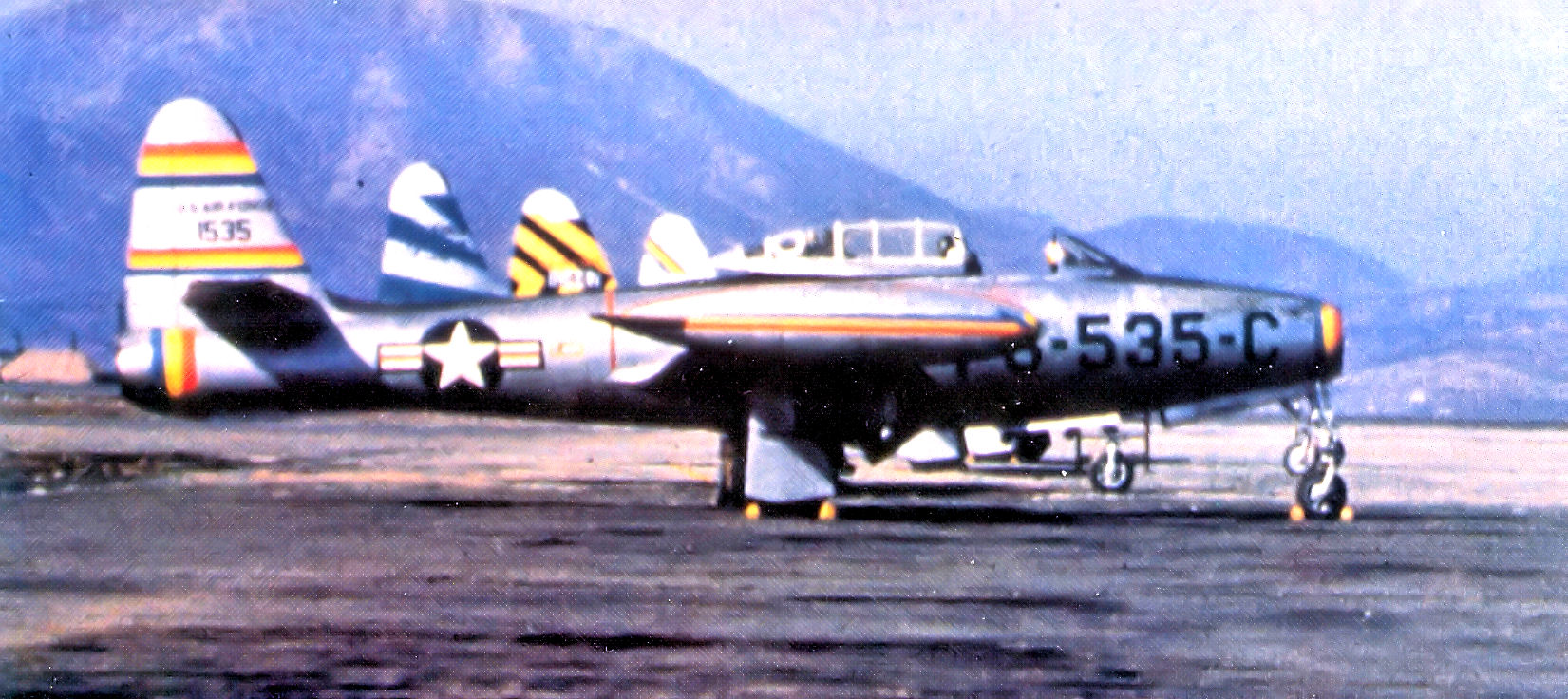
58th Fighter-Bomber Group F-84E South Korea, 1952. Commander's aircraft 51-1535, other three squadrons aircraft shown in different tail markings

Activated in Korea during the Korean War, absorbed the personnel and equipment of the 136th Fighter-Bomber Group, then provided close air support for UN ground forces and attacked enemy airfields and installations. Having entered the war with slow, short-ranged F-84D ThunderJets, the 58 FBG transitioned in late 1952 to the new "G" model, designed with more speed and range. New targets included enemy ports, railroads, and airfields. The group attacked the major supply port of Sinuiju in September, inflicting heavy damage without loss of personnel or aircraft. Combining with other fighter-bomber units, it attacked the Kumgang Political School at Odong-ni in October 1952 and the North Korean tank and infantry school at Kangso in February 1953. In May, the 58th FBG bombed North Korean dams, flooding enemy lines of communication and rice fields. On 27 July 1953, attacked runway at Kanggye and, with the 49 FBG, bombed Sunan Airfield for the final action of fighter-bombers in the Korean War. Earned a second DUC for its actions in the last three months of the war.

After the war, provided air defense for South Korea and deployed tactical components on rotational basis to Taiwan, January 1955 – February 1957. In October 1958, armed with tactical missiles to provide air defense of South Korea until 1962.

=== From 1991 ===
From October 1991, conducted combat crew training for F-15E aircrews and F-16 pilots; F-16C/D squadrons had a secondary, wartime mission of augmenting national air defenses. Early in 1993, added a mission of training international (Republic of Singapore) pilots in F-16A/B aircraft, the first one arriving in March 1993. The next month, the group lost its wartime mission.

In April 1994, gave up fighter pilot training function and moved without personnel or equipment from Luke to Kirtland AFB, NM, taking over the resources of the 542d Crew Training Wing, which was being inactivated. The wing trained aircrews in special operations and in search, rescue, and recovery. Additional missions included training pararescue and combat control teams, deploying personnel and equipment to support contingencies, and conducting search and rescue missions at request of local authorities. The 58 OG also accomplished all USAF undergraduate helicopter training via the 23d Flying Training Flight (later, Squadron) at Fort Rucker, AL. On 11 September 2001, after terrorists hijacked four civilian airliners and flew three of them into buildings in New York and Washington, the group airlifted a federal task force to Pennsylvania to investigate the crash site of the fourth airliner. Later the wing deployed personnel to support combat operations in Afghanistan (2001–) and Iraq (2003–).

== Lineage ==
- Established as 58th Pursuit Group (Interceptor) on 20 November 1940

Activated on 16 January 1941
Redesignated: 58th Fighter Group on 15 May 1942
Redesignated: 58th Fighter Group, Single Engine, on 20 August 1943
Inactivated on 27 January 1946

- Redesignated 58th Fighter-Bomber Group on 25 June 1952

Activated on 10 July 1952
Inactivated on 8 November 1957

- Redesignated 58th Tactical Missile Group on 17 June 1958

Activated on 15 July 1958
Discontinued, and inactivated, on 25 March 1962

- Redesignated 58th Operations Group, and activated, on 1 October 1991.

=== Assignments ===
- Northeast Air District (later, First Air Force), 16 January 1941
- 3 Interceptor Command, 2 October 1941
- I Fighter Command, 17 October 1942

Attached to: Philadelphia Fighter Wing, 24 October 1942-c. 3 March 1943
Attached to: New York Fighter Wing, 3 March-28 April 1943
Attached to: Boston Fighter Wing, 28 April-22 October 1943

- Fifth Air Force, 19 November 1943

Attached to: 86th Fighter Wing, 1 May-25 August 1944
Attached to: 309th Bombardment Wing, 25 August 1944 – 1 January 1945
Attached to: 310th Bombardment Wing, 1 January 1945–

- V Fighter Command, by 6 March 1945

Remained attached to: 310th Bombardment Wing until 7 April 1945

- Far East Air Forces, 23 November 1945
- Pacific Air Command, by 10–27 January 1946
- 58th Fighter-Bomber Wing, 10 July 1952 – 8 November 1957
- Fifth Air Force, 15 July 1958
- 314th Air Division, 24 April 1959 – 25 March 1962
- 58th (later, 58th Special Operations) Wing, 1 October 1991–present

=== Components ===
- 23d Flying Training Flight (later 23d Flying Training Squadron): 1 April 1994 – present
- 36th Rescue Flight (later 36th Rescue Squadron): 1 July 2012 – 15 April 2014, 14 August 2015 – present
- 62d Fighter Squadron: 18 March-1 April 1994
- 63d Fighter Squadron: 25 February 1993 – 1 April 1994
- 67th Pursuit (later, 67th Fighter) Squadron: 16 January 1941 – 3 October 1942
- 68th Pursuit (later, 68th Fighter) Squadron: 16 January 1941 – 3 October 1942
- 69th Pursuit (later, 69th Fighter; 69th Fighter-Bomber) Squadron: 16 January 1941 – 27 January 1946; 10 July 1952 – 8 November 1957
- 71st Special Operations Squadron: 20 May 2005–present
- 310th Pursuit (later, 310th Fighter, 310th Fighter-Bomber, 310th Tactical Missile, 310th Tactical Fighter Training, 310th Fighter) Squadron: 9 February 1942 – 27 January 1946; 10 July 1952 – 8 November 1957; 15 July 1958 – 25 March 1962; 1 October 1991 – 1 April 1994
- 311th Pursuit (later, 311th Fighter, 311th Fighter-Bomber, 311th Tactical Fighter Training, 311th Fighter) Squadron: 9 February 1942 – 27 January 1946; 10 July 1952 – 8 November 1957; 1 October 1991 – 1 April 1994
- 314th Tactical Fighter Training (later, 314th Fighter) Squadron: 1 October 1991 – 1 April 1994
- 415th Special Operations Squadron: 2010 – present
- 425th Fighter Squadron: 30 December 1992 – 1 April 1994
- 461st Tactical Fighter Training (later, 461st Fighter) Squadron: 1 October 1991 – 1 April 1994
- 512th Special Operations (later, 512th Rescue) Squadron: 1 April 1994–present
- 550th Special Operations Squadron: 1 April 1994 – c. 29 September 2016
- 550th Tactical Fighter Training (later, 550th Fighter) Squadron: 1 October-14 November 1991; 25 March-1 April 1994
- 551st Special Operations Squadron: 1 April 1994 – 8 December 2007
- 555th Tactical Fighter Training (later, 555th Fighter) Squadron: 1 October-25 March 1994
- 607th Air Control Squadron: 1 May 1992 – 1 July 1993.

=== Stations ===
- Selfridge Field, Michigan, 15 January 1941
- Harding Army Airfield, Louisiana, 5 October 1941
- Dale Mabry Field, Florida, 4 March 1942
- Richmond AAB, Virginia, 16 October 1942
- Philadelphia Muni Aprt, Pennsylvania, 24 October 1942
- Bradley Field, Connecticut, c. 3 March 1943
- Green Field, Rhode Island, 28 April 1943
- Grenier Field, New Hampshire, 16 September-22 October 1943
- Sydney Airport, Australia, 19 November 1943
- Archerfield Airport, Brisbane, Australia, 21 November 1943
- Dobodura Airfield Complex, New Guinea, 28 December 1943
- Saidor Airfield, New Guinea, c. 3 April 1944
- Kornasoren Airport, Noemfoor, Schouten Islands, 30 August 1944
- San Roque Airfield, Mindanao, Philippines, 18 November 1944
- McGuire Field, San Jose, Mindoro, Philippines, c. 30 December 1944
- Mangaldan Airfield, Luzon, Philippines, 5 April 1945
- Porac Airfield, Luzon, Philippines, 18 April 1945
- Motobu Airfield, Okinawa, 10 July 1945
- Japan, 26 October 1945
- Fort William McKinley, Luzon, Philippines, 28 December 1945 – 27 January 1946
- Taegu AB (K-2), South Korea, 10 July 1952
- Osan-Ni (later, Osan) AB, South Korea, 15 March 1955 – 8 November 1957
- Osan AB, South Korea, 15 July 1958 – 25 March 1962
- Luke AFB, Arizona, 1 October 1991
- Kirtland AFB, New Mexico, 1 April 1994–present

=== Aircraft and missiles ===
- Seversky P-35, 1941–1943
- Curtiss P-36 Hawk, 1941–1943
- P-39 Airacobra, 1941–1943
- P-40 Warhawk, 1941–1943
- P-47 Thunderbolt, 1943–1945
- F-84 Thunderjet, 1952–1954
- F-86 Sabre, 1954–1957
- MGM-1 Matador, 1958–1962
- F-15 Eagle, 1991–1994
- F-16 Falcon, 1991–1994
- UH-1 Iroquois, 1994–present
- HH-60 Pave Hawk, 1994–present
- MH-53 Pave LowJ/M, 1994–2007
- CH-53 Sea Stallion, 1994–2001
- HC-130 Combat King, 1994–1997, 2000–present
- MC-130P Combat Shadow, 1994–present
- C-12 Huron, 1999–2002
- CV-22B Osprey, 2006–present
- TH-1H, 2008–present
- HC-130J Combat King II, 2011–present
- MC-130J Commando II, 2011–present
- MH-139J Grey Wolf, 2024-present
