= 54th Fighter Group =

Unit of the United States Air Force

54th Fighter Group

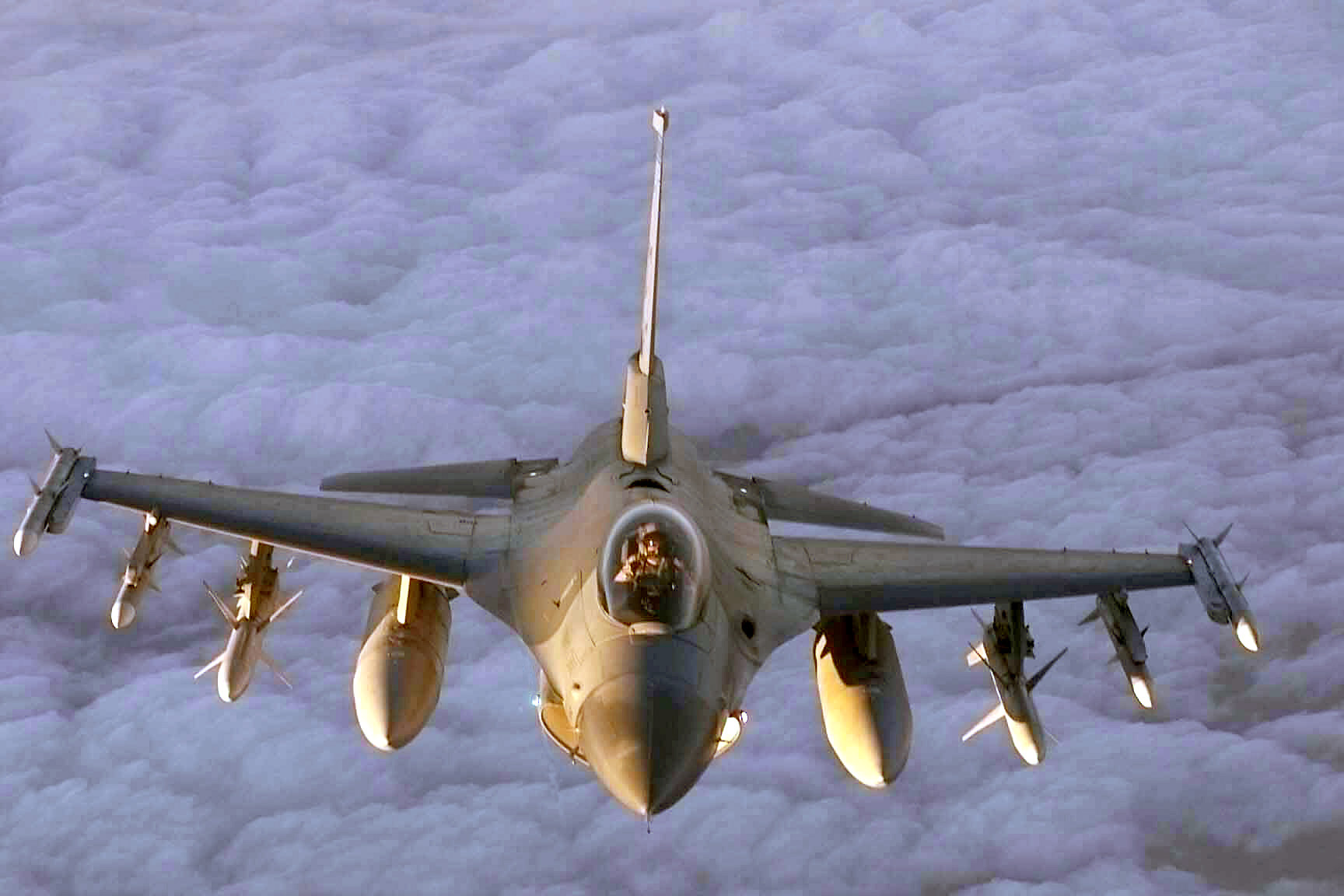
- F-16 Fighting Falcon as flown by the 54th Fighter Group
- Active: 1941–1944; 1955–1958; 2014-present
- Country: United States
- Branch: United States Air Force
- Role: Fighter training
- Size: 800 people
- Part of: Air Force Reserve Command
- Garrison/HQ: Holloman Air Force Base
- Engagements: American Theater of World War II; Pacific Theater of Operations
- Decorations: Distinguished Unit Citation

Insignia
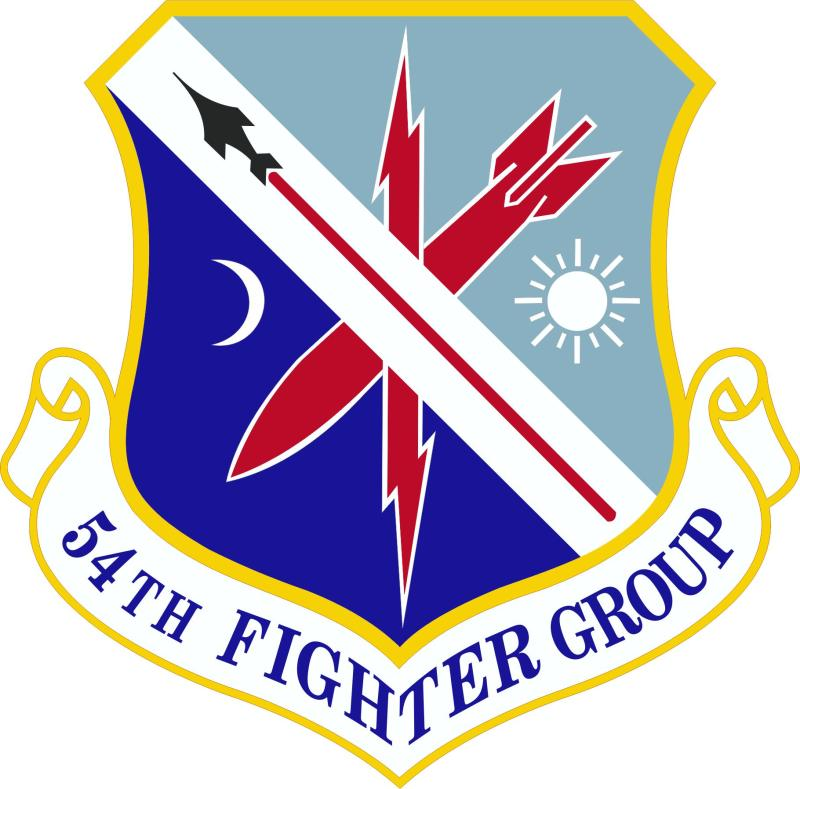
- 54th Fighter Group emblem (Note: Approved 8 March 1957.)

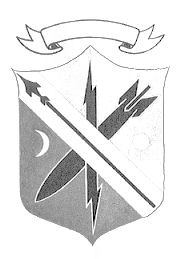
- 54th Fighter Group emblem as originally approved

The 54th Fighter Group is an active unit of the United States Air Force stationed at Holloman Air Force Base, New Mexico and assigned to the 49th Wing of Air Combat Command. The group was reactivated in March 2014.

The group was first activated as the 54th Pursuit Group during the buildup of the Air Corps just prior to World War II. It served in Alaska during the Aleutian Islands Campaign, earning a Distinguished Unit Citation. It then returned to the United States and served as a training unit.

The group was again activated in 1955 as part of Air Defense Command's Project Arrow, replacing the 500th Air Defense Group. It served in the air defense role until 1958 when it was inactivated.

The group was activated once again as a training unit for the General Dynamics F-16 Fighting Falcon in 2014. The group was part of the 56th Fighter Wing at Luke Air Force Base, Arizona until October 2018 when it was transferred to the 49th Wing, the host unit of Holloman.

== Mission ==
The group trains an average of 180 students per year. It has an extensive flying program, averaging more than 10,800 sorties and 14,600 hours per fiscal year. The group consists of approximately 800 personnel, maintains $2.2 billion in F-16 assets and executes a $144 million operations and maintenance budget to carry out F-16 training.

== History ==
=== World War II ===
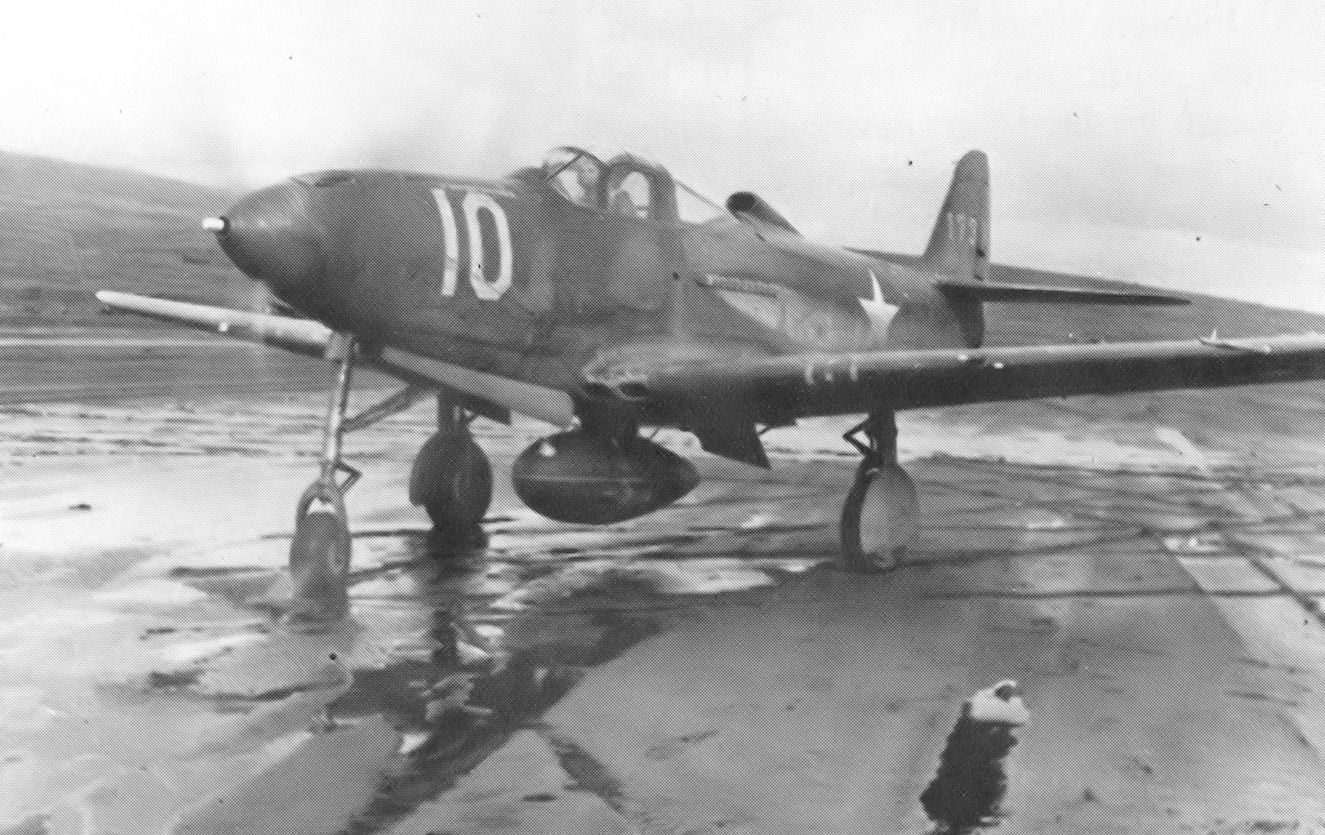
42d Fighter Squadron P-39F at Adak, Alaska

The group was activated as the 54th Pursuit Group (Interceptor) at the beginning of 1941 at Hamilton Field, California. with the 42d, 56th, and 57th Pursuit Squadrons assigned. It trained with Curtiss P-36 Hawks and Curtiss P-40 Warhawks, then moved to Everett Army Air Field, where it served as a part of the air defense force for the northwest Pacific coast during the first few months of World War II. The group and its squadrons were redesignated as fighter units in May 1942.

The air echelon, equipped with Bell P-39 Airacobras, served in Alaska against the Japanese forces that invaded the Aleutian Islands during the summer of 1942, and for these operations the group received a Distinguished Unit Citation.

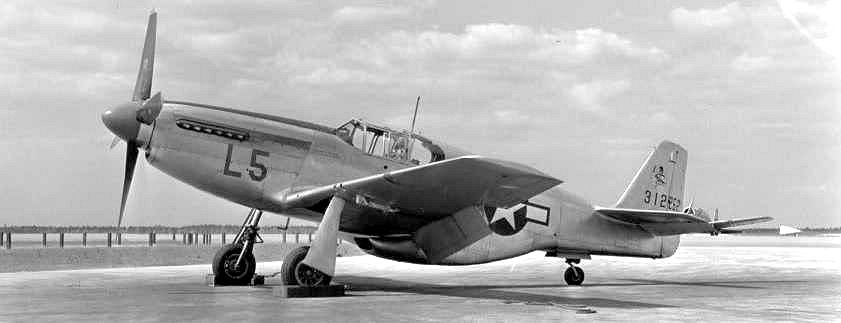
54th Fighter Group P-51 at Hillsborough AAF

The air echelon returned to the US in December 1942 and rejoined the group, which had been assigned to Third Air Force in Louisiana, and became a Replacement Training Unit (RTU) for North American P-51 Mustang pilots. RTUs were oversized units training individual pilots or aircrews. In early May 1943, the group began a split operation, with headquarters and the 56th and 57th Fighter Squadrons relocating to Bartow Army Air Field, Florida, while the 42d was at Hillsborough Army Air Field. However, the AAF was finding that standard military units, based on relatively inflexible tables of organization were proving less well adapted to the training mission. Accordingly, a more functional system was adopted in which each base was organized into a separate numbered unit. As a result, in 1944 the group was disbanded as the AAF converted to the AAF Base Unit system. The units at Bartow were replaced by the 340th AAF Base Unit (Replacement Training Unit, Fighter), while those at Hillsborough transferred their mission, equipment, and personnel to the 343d AAF Base Unit (Replacement Training Unit, Fighter).

=== Cold War ===
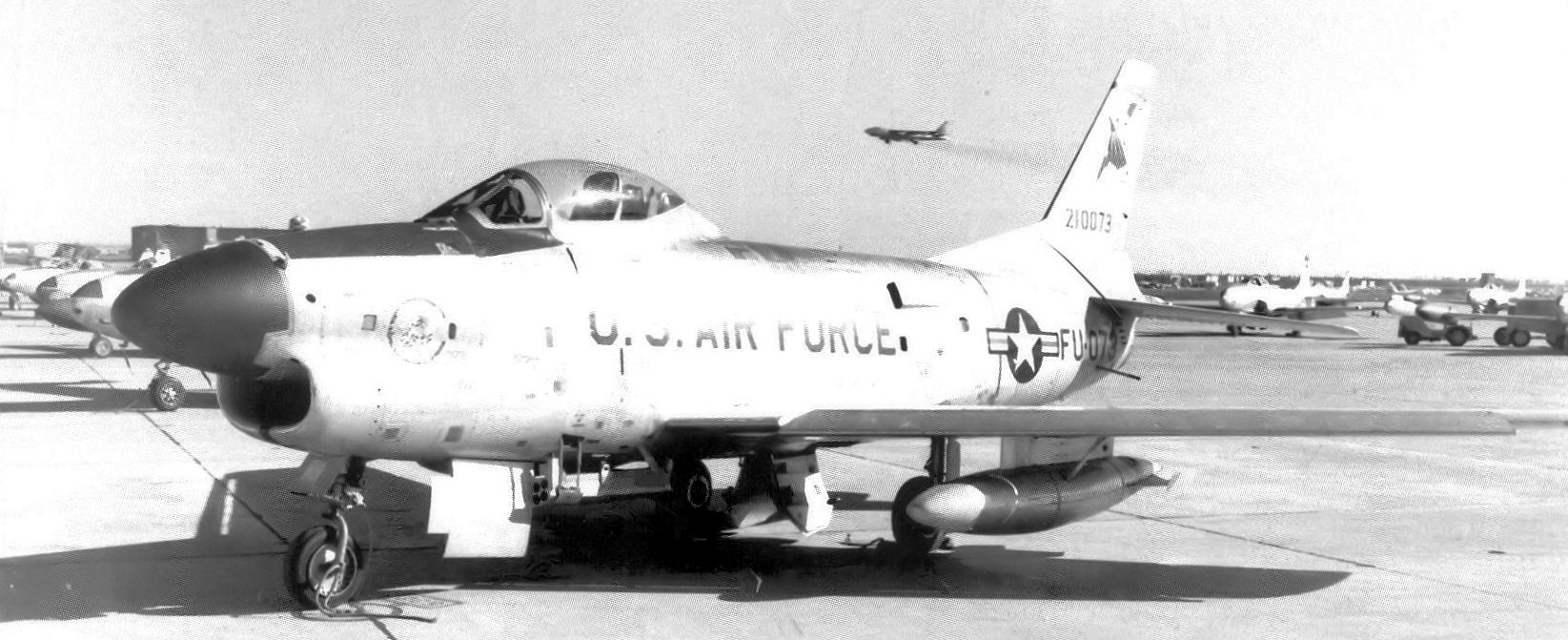
54th Fighter Group F-86 Sabre at Greater Pittsburgh Apt

In 1955, the group was redesignated as the 54th Fighter Group (Air Defense) and activated at Greater Pittsburgh Airport to replace the 500th Air Defense Group as part of ADC's Project Arrow, which was designed to bring back on the active list the fighter units which had compiled memorable records in the two world wars. The group assumed host responsibilities for the USAF portion of the airport and was assigned a USAF Dispensary, Air Base Squadron and Materiel Squadron to fulfill this responsibility. Because Project Arrow was also intended to reunite fighter squadrons with their former groups, the 42d Fighter-Interceptor Squadron, which was stationed at O'Hare Airport moved to Pittsburgh and assumed the personnel and equipment of the 500th group's 71st Fighter-Interceptor Squadron, including its radar equipped and rocket armed North American F-86 Sabres. The squadron transitioned into data link equipped F-86Ls in the spring of 1957 for interception control through the Semi-Automatic Ground Environment system and flew them until the group and squadron were inactivated in early 1958.

=== Present day ===
The group was reactivated in March 2014 at Holloman Air Force Base, New Mexico. It is an F-16 Fighting Falcon training unit under the 49th Wing.

== Lineage ==
- Constituted as 54th Pursuit Group (Interceptor) on 20 November 1940
- Activated on 15 January 1941

Redesignated as 54th Fighter Group (Single Engine) on 15 May 1942
Disbanded on 1 May 1944.
Reconstituted and redesignated 54th Fighter Group (Air Defense), on 20 June 1955

- Activated on 18 August 1955

Inactivated on 8 January 1958
Redesignated 54th Fighter Group on 20 February 2014 (Note: On 31 July 1985, the group was redesignated the 364th Tactical Fighter Group. This action was revoked on 19 February 2014 without the group ever being active. DAF/MPM Ltr 648q, 31 July 1985; DAF/A1M Ltr 648q-2, 19 February 2014.)

- Activated on 1 March 2014

=== Assignments ===
- 1st Wing, 15 January 1941
- 2d Interceptor Command, 9 April 1941
- 5th Air Support Command, 31 January 1942
- 3rd Interceptor Command (15 May 1942 - 3rd Fighter Command; 18 September 1942 - III Fighter Command), 18 April 1942 – 1 May 1944 (Air echelon deployed to Eleventh Air Force, 1 June 1942 – 30 November 1942)
- 4708th Air Defense Wing, 18 August 1955
- 30th Air Division, 8 July 1956 – 8 January 1958
- 56th Fighter Wing, 1 March 2014
- 49th Wing, 1 October 2018 – present

=== Stations ===
- Hamilton Field, California, 15 January 1941
- Everett Army Air Field, Washington, 26 June 1941
- Harding Field, Louisiana, 31 January 1942
- Bartow Army Air Field, Florida, 11 May 1943 – 1 May 1944
- Greater Pittsburgh Airport, Pennsylvania, 18 August 1955 – 8 January 1958
- Holloman Air Force Base, New Mexico, 1 March 2014 – present

=== Components ===
Operational Squadrons

- 8th Fighter Squadron: c. 4 August 2017 – present
- 42d Pursuit Squadron, later 42d Fighter Squadron, 42d Fighter-Interceptor Squadron, 42d Fighter Squadron: 15 January 1941 – 1 May 1944; 18 August 1955 – 8 January 1958
- 56th Pursuit Squadron, later 56th Fighter Squadron: 15 January 1941 – 1 May 1944
- 57th Pursuit Squadron, later 57th Fighter Squadron: 15 January 1941 – 1 May 1944
- 311th Fighter Squadron: 1 March 2014 – present
- 314th Fighter Squadron: 6 July 2015 – present

Support Units

- 54th USAF Infirmary: 18 August 1955 – 8 January 1958
- 54th Air Base Squadron: 18 August 1955 – 8 January 1958
- 54th Aircraft Maintenance Squadron: 14 March 2014 – present
- 54th Materiel Squadron: 18 August 1955 – 8 January 1958
- 54th Operations Support Squadron: 1 March 2014 – Present
- 54th Maintenance Squadron: 1 March 2014 – present

=== Aircraft operated ===
- Curtiss P-36 Hawk, 1940–1941
- Curtiss P-40 Warhawk, 1941–1942
- Bell P-39 Airacobra, 1942–1943
- North American P-51 Mustang, 1943–1944
- North American F-86D Sabre, 1955–1957
- North American F-86L Sabre, 1957–1958
- Lockheed-Martin F-16C Fighting Falcon, 2014–present

=== Awards and campaigns ===
Award streamer	Award	Dates	Notes
	Distinguished Unit Citation	(June 1942)-4 November 1942	
	Air Force Outstanding Unit Award	1 March-30 June 2014	
	Air Force Outstanding Unit Award	1 July 2014-30 June 2015	
	Air Force Outstanding Unit Award	1 July 2015-30 June 2016	
	Air Force Outstanding Unit Award	1 July 2016-30 June 2017	

54th Fighter Group

Aerial Victories	Number	Note
Group Hq	0
42d Fighter Squadron	7
56th Fighter Squadron	0
57th Fighter Squadron	3
Group Total	10

Campaign Streamer	Campaign	Dates	Notes
	American Theater without inscription	7 December 1941 – 1 May 1944	54th Fighter Group
	Aleutian Islands	3 June 1942 – 30 November 1942	54th Fighter Group

== See also ==
- Aerospace Defense Command Fighter Squadrons
- List of F-86 Sabre units
- General Dynamics F-16 Fighting Falcon operators
