= 501st Combat Support Group =

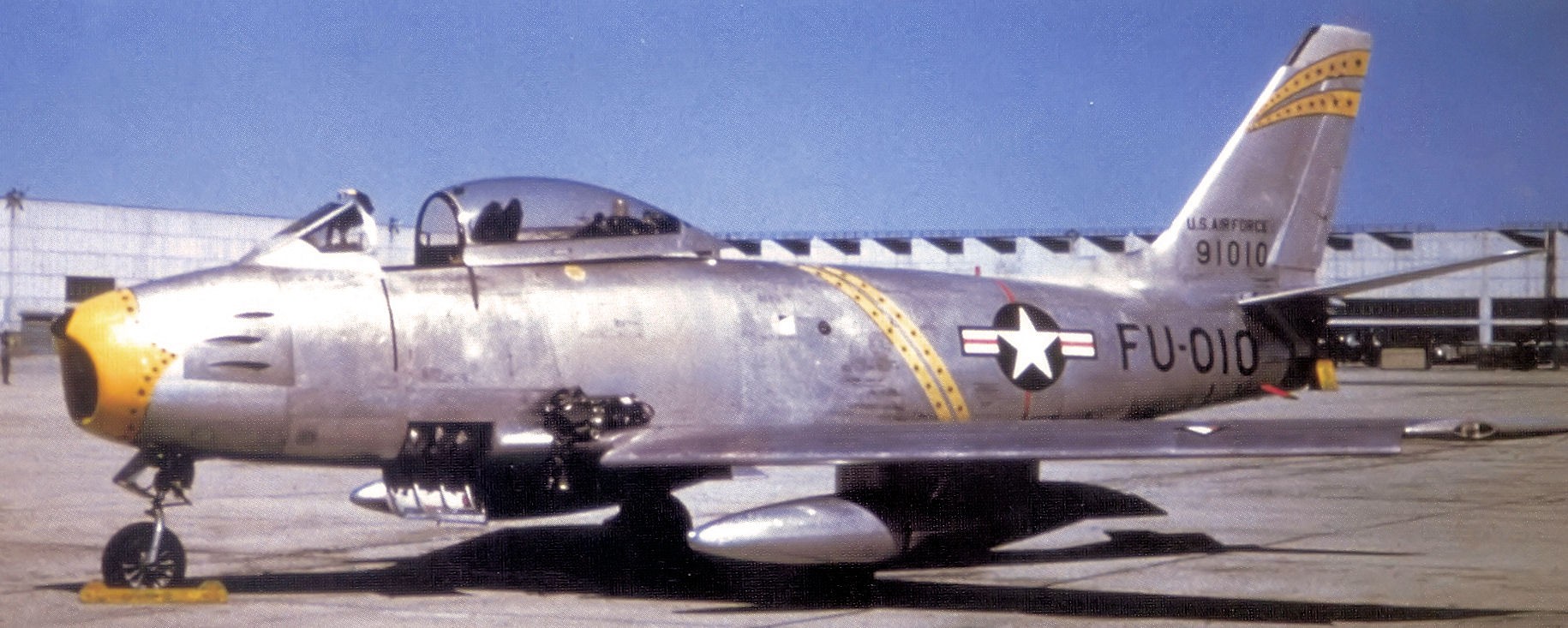
- 62d Fighter-Interceptor Squadron F-86A Sabre at O'Hare IAP (Note: Aircraft is North American F-86A-5-NA Sabre 49-1010, taken in 1951. This aircraft was transferred to the Air National Guard in January 1954 and was salvaged in May 1958. Baugher, Joe (19 January 2023). "1949 USAF Serial Numbers". Joe Baugher.)
- Active: 1945–1948; 1953–1955; 1982–1991
- Country: United States
- Branch: United States Air Force
- Role: Base support
- Decorations: Air Force Outstanding Unit Award

Insignia
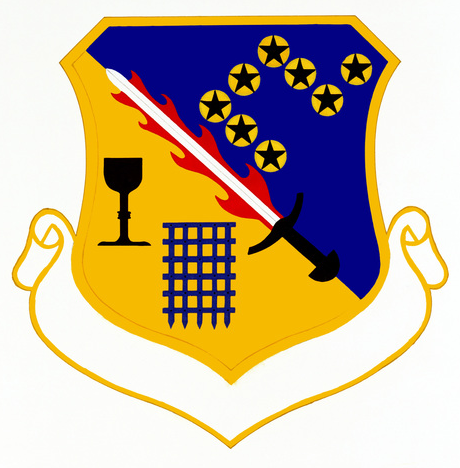
- 501st Combat Support Group Emblem (Note: Approved September 1983. When assigned to the 501st Wing, the group uses the wing emblem with the group designation on the scroll. AF Instruction 84-105, Organizational Lineage, Honors and History, 27 April 2017, paragraph 3.3.3)>

The 501st Combat Support Group is an inactive United States Air Force organization. It was last active as part of the 501st Tactical Missile Wing at RAF Greenham Common, England, where it provided support for the wing and tenant organizations as the host organization for Greenham Common from 1982 to 1991.

The group was originally activated as the 501st Air Service Group, a support group, at the end of World War II and continued this mission with the American occupation forces in Germany through the beginning of the Berlin Airlift, when it was inactivated as United States Air Forces Europe implemented the wing base organization system. In 1982 the group was consolidated with the 501st Base Headquarters and Air Base Squadron, a Second Air Force unit that provided base support at Great Bend Army Air Field, Kansas from 1943 to 1944.

The group was activated once again in 1953 as the 501st Air Defense Group, when Air Defense Command (ADC) established it as the headquarters for a dispersed fighter-interceptor squadron and the medical, aircraft maintenance, and administrative squadrons supporting it. It was replaced in 1955 when ADC transferred its mission, equipment, and personnel to the 56th Fighter Group in a project that replaced air defense groups commanding fighter squadrons with fighter groups with distinguished records during World War II.

== History ==
=== World War II and Occupation of Germany ===
The earliest predecessor of the 501st Combat Support Group was the 501st Base Headquarters and Air Base Squadron, which was organized in 1943 as the headquarters for Great Bend Army Air Field, Kansas, a World War II very heavy bombardment training base. Great Bend was one of the original bases where Boeing B-29 Superfortress units received their training before deploying to the China Burma India Theater. However, the Army Air Forces (AAF) found that standard military units, based on relatively inflexible tables of organization were proving themselves less well adapted to the training mission. Accordingly, a more functional system was adopted in which each base was organized into a separate numbered unit. This resulted in the 501st, along with other units at Great Bend, being disbanded and its personnel, equipment and functions transferred to the 243d AAF Base Unit (Operational Training Unit, Very Heavy).

The 501st Air Service Group was established toward the end of World War II to provide support for flying units in Germany and Austria from 1945 to 1948 as part of a reorganization of AAF support groups in which the AAF replaced service groups that included personnel from other branches of the Army and supported two combat groups with air service groups including only Air Corps units. It was designed to support a single combat group. Its 919th Air Engineering Squadron provided maintenance that was beyond the capability of the combat group, its 743rd Air Materiel Squadron handled all supply matters, and its Headquarters & Base Services Squadron provided other support. The group moved to Wiesbaden Air Base, Germany, where it replaced the 97th Airdrome Squadron as the primary support unit for the airfield. It briefly supported the Berlin Airlift before inactivation in 1948. It was replaced by elements of the 7150th AF Composite Wing in the Air Force wing base reorganization in 1948. which was adopted to unify control at air bases The group was disbanded later in 1948.

=== Air Defense of the United States ===
During the Cold War, the group was reconstituted, redesignated as the 501st Air Defense Group, and activated by Air Defense Command (ADC) at O'Hare International Airport on 16 February 1953 with responsibility for air defense in the Great Lakes area. It was assigned the 62d Fighter-Interceptor Squadron, which was already stationed at O'Hare, flying North American F-86 Sabres as its operational component. The 62d had been assigned directly to the 4706th Defense Wing prior to the activation of the 501st Group. The group replaced the 83rd Air Base Squadron as USAF active duty host organization at O'Hare. It was assigned three squadrons to perform its support responsibilities.

The group added a second operational unit, the 42d Fighter-Interceptor Squadron, which was activated at O'Hare eight days after the group headquarters, and also Flew F-86s. In March 1953, the 62d Squadron converted to newer radar equipped and Mighty Mouse rocket armed North American F-86Ds. The group was inactivated and replaced by the 56th Fighter Group in 1955 as part of ADC's Project Arrow, which was designed to bring back on the active list the fighter units which had compiled memorable records in the two world wars.

=== Ground Launched Cruise Missile Support ===
In the early 1980s USAF began deploying Ground Launched Cruise Missiles in the European theater. The 501st Tactical Missile Wing was organized at RAF Greenham Common as the first USAF wing equipped with the BGM-109 Tomahawk missile. The 501st group was redesignated the 501st Combat Support Group and activated as the headquarters for organizations supporting the wing and hosted all USAF organizations at Greenham Common. As the Intermediate-Range Nuclear Forces Treaty was implemented, the USAF withdrew its missiles from Europe and the wing and group were inactivated.

== Lineage ==
501st Base Headquarters and Air Base Squadron

- Constituted as the 501st Base Headquarters and Air Base Squadron

Activated on 26 January 1943
Disbanded on 1 April 1944

- Reconstituted on 11 January 1982 and consolidated with the 501st Air Defense Group as the 501st Combat Support Group

501st Combat Support Group

- Constituted as the 501st Air Service Group on 16 December 1944

Activated on 1 June 1945
Inactivated on 1 July 1948
Disbanded on 8 October 1948

- Reconstituted and redesignated 501st Air Defense Group on 21 January 1953

Activated on 16 February 1953
Inactivated on 18 August 1955

- Redesignated 501st Combat Support Group on 11 January 1982 and consolidated with the 501st Base Headquarters and Air Base Squadron

Activated on 1 October 1982
Inactivated on 31 May 1991

=== Assignments ===
- Second Air Force, 26 January 1943 – 1 April 1944
- Unknown (probably European Air Transport Service) 1 June 1945 – ca. June 1946
- Headquarters Command, United States Air Forces Europe ca. June 1946 – 1 July 1948
- 4706th Defense Wing (later 4706th Air Defense Wing), 16 February 1953 – 18 August 1955
- 501st Tactical Missile Wing, 1 October 1982 – 31 May 1991

=== Stations ===
- Great Bend Army Air Field, Kansas, 26 January 1943 – 1 April 1944
- Bensheim, Germany, c. 1 June 1945
- Tulln Air Base, Austria 25 August 1945
- Wiesbaden Air Base, Germany 1 June 1946 – 1 July 1948
- O'Hare International Airport, Illinois, 16 February 1953 – 18 August 1955
- RAF Greenham Common, England, United Kingdom, 1 October 1982 – 31 May 1991

=== Components ===
Operational Squadrons

- 42d Fighter-Interceptor Squadron, 24 February 1953 – 18 August 1955
- 62d Fighter-Interceptor Squadron, 16 February 1953 – 18 August 1955

Support Squadrons

- 501st Air Base Squadron, 16 February 1953 – 18 August 1955
- 501st Civil Engineering Squadron, 1 October 1982 – 31 May 1991
- 501st Materiel Squadron, 16 February 1953 – 18 August 1955
- 501st Medical Squadron (later 501st USAF Infirmary), 16 February 1953 – 18 August 1955
- 501st Missile Support Squadron, c. 1987 – 31 May 1991
- 501st Security Police Squadron, 1 October 1982 – c. 1 January 1983
- 743rd Air Materiel Squadron, 1 June 1945 – 1 July 1948
- 919th Air Engineering Squadron, 1 June 1945 – 1 July 1948

=== Aircraft ===
- North American F-86A Sabre, 1953
- North American F-86D Sabre, 1953–1955
- North American F-86F Sabre, 1953–1955

=== Awards and campaigns ===
Award streamer	Award	Dates	Notes
	Air Force Outstanding Unit Award	1 July 1982 – 30 June 1984	501st Combat Support Group
	Air Force Outstanding Unit Award	1 July 1987 – 31 May 1989	501st Combat Support Group
	Air Force Outstanding Unit Award	1 June 1989 – 31 May 1991	501st Combat Support Group

Service Streamer	Service	Dates	Notes
	American Theater of World War II	26 January 1943 – 1 April 1944	501st Base Headquarters and Air Base Squadron
	World War II Army of Occupation	6 May 1945 – 1 July 1948	501st Air Service Group

== See also ==
- List of United States Air Force Aerospace Defense Command Interceptor Squadrons
- List of F-86 Sabre units
