= 42nd Flying Training Squadron =

42d Flying Training Squadron

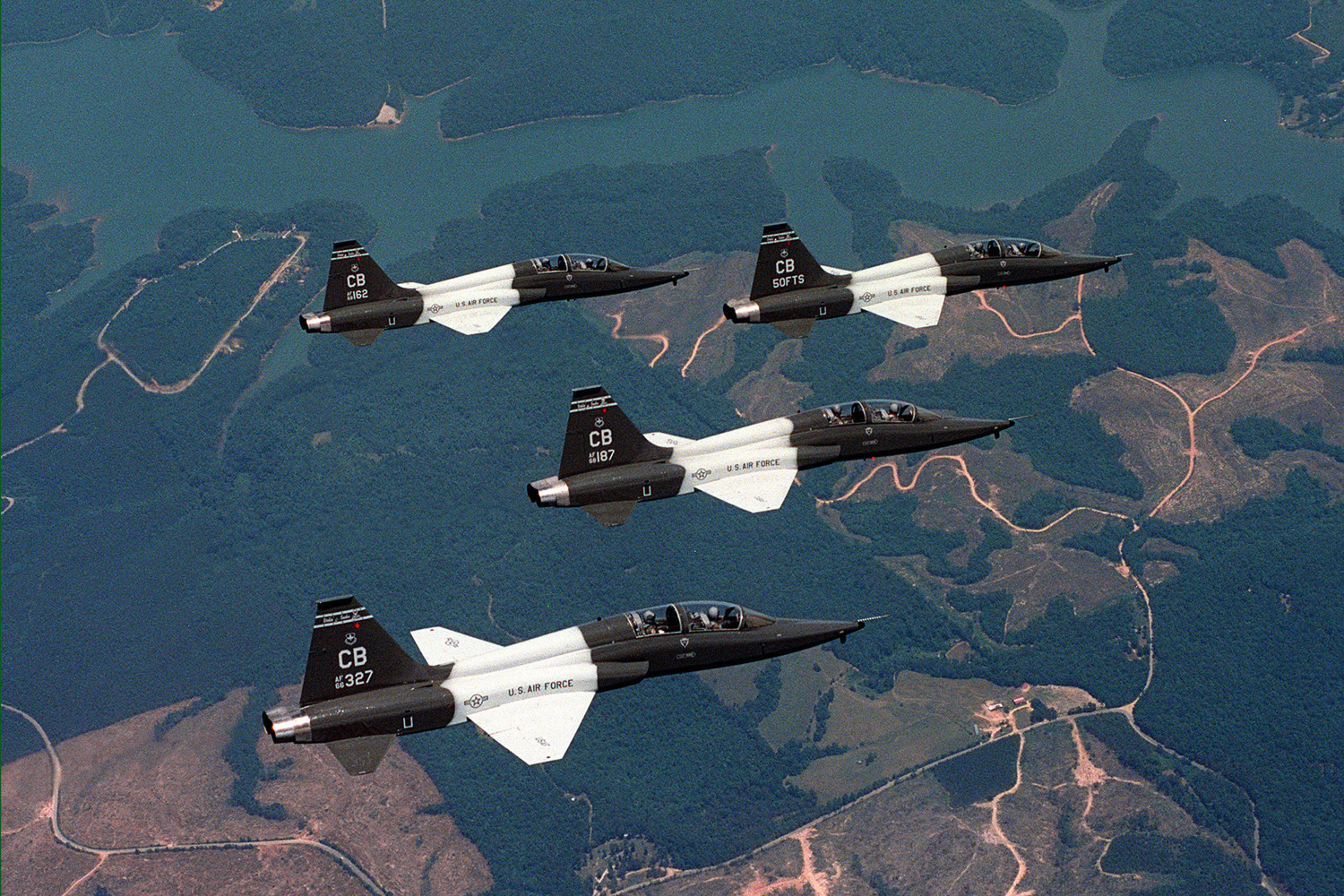
- T-38s from Columbus AFB
- Active: 1940–1944; 1947-1949; 1953-1958; 1990-1991
- Country: United States
- Branch: United States Air Force
- Role: Flying Training
- Part of: Air Education and Training Command
- Engagements: Asiatic-Pacific Theater; American Theater of World War II
- Decorations: Distinguished Unit Citation

Insignia
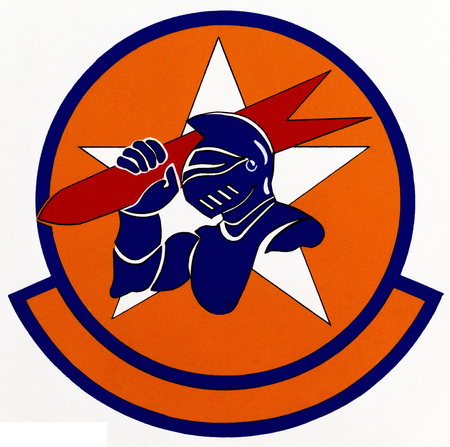
- 42d Flying Training Squadron emblem

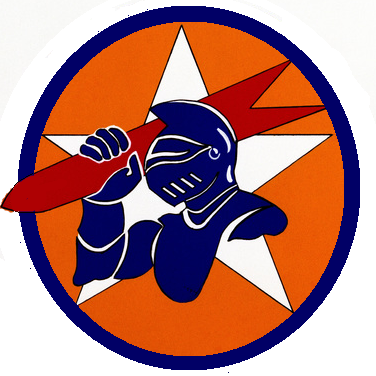
- 42d Fighter-Interceptor Squadron emblem (Note: Approved 7 March 1956.)

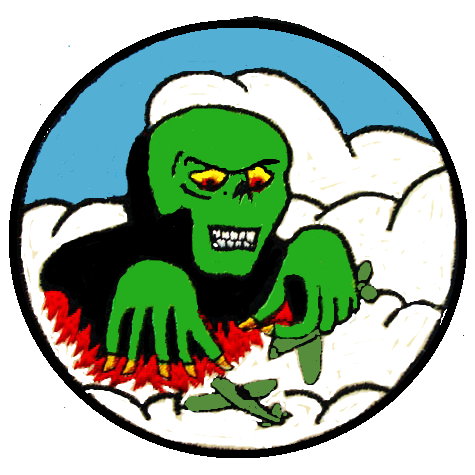
- 42d Fighter Squadron emblem (World War II)

The 42d Flying Training Squadron is an inactive United States Air Force unit, last assigned to Air Training Command at Columbus AFB, Mississippi, where it was inactivated on 15 December 1991.

The squadron was first activated at Hamilton Field, California in 1941 as the 42d Pursuit Squadron. It deployed to Alaska where it participated in combat during the Aleutian Campaign. It returned to the United States, where it became a training unit and was disbanded in a general reorganization of the Army Air Forces in 1944.

From 1947 to 1949 the squadron was active in the Air Force reserve as the 42d Fighter Squadron, but was not fully manned or equipped.

The squadron was redesignated the 42d Fighter-Interceptor Squadron and activated in 1953 as an air defense unit in the midwestern United States. It flew North American F-86 Sabres until it was inactivated in 1958.

The squadron conducted undergraduate pilot training as the 42d Flying Training Squadron at Columbus Air Force Base from 1990 to 1992.

== History ==
=== World War II ===
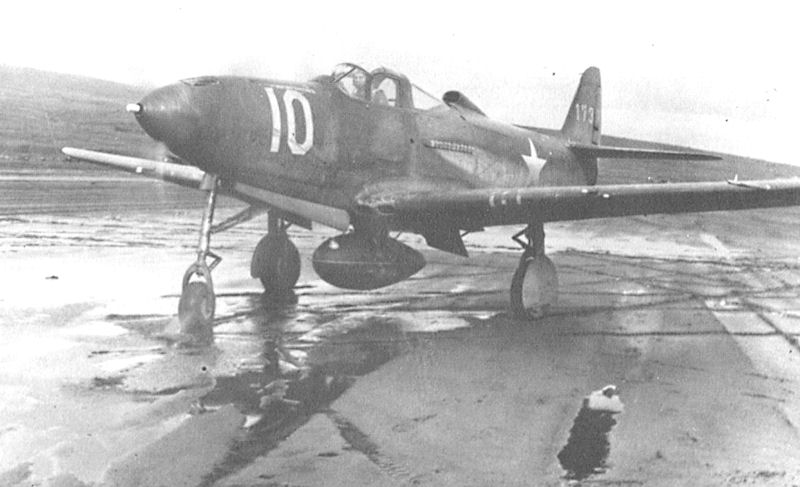
P-39 of the 42d Fighter Squadron in Alaska

The squadron was activated at Hamilton Field, California as the 42d Pursuit Squadron on 15 January 1941, as one of the three original squadrons of the 54th Pursuit Group. It trained with Curtiss P-36 Hawks and Curtiss P-40 Warhawks, then moved to Everett Army Air Field, and served as a part of the air defense force for the Pacific coast during the first few months of World War II. The squadron was redesignated as a fighter unit in May 1942.

On 12 June 1942, the air echelon of the 42d took its newly assigned Bell P-39 Airacobras to Nome, Alaska, where it served in combat against the Japanese forces that invaded the Aleutian Islands during the summer of 1942. The squadron was credited with the destruction of seven enemy aircraft in aerial combat.

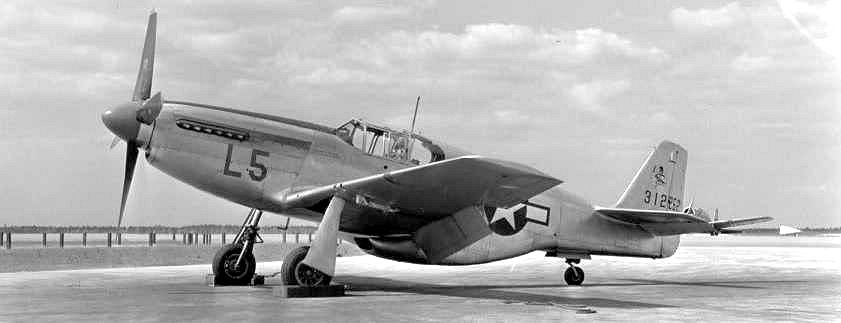
P-51B 43-12252 of the 42d Fighter Squadron at Hillsborough Army Air Field in April 1944

The air echelon returned to the United States in December 1942 and rejoined the group, which had been assigned to Third Air Force in Louisiana, and became a replacement training unit (RTU) for North American P-51 Mustang pilots. RTUs were oversized units training individual pilots or aircrews. In early May 1943, the 54th Fighter Group began a split operation, with headquarters and the other squadrons of the group relocating to Bartow Army Air Field, Florida, while the 42d was at Hillsborough Army Air Field. However, the Army Air Forces (AAF) was finding that standard military units, based on relatively inflexible tables of organization, were proving less well adapted to the training mission. Accordingly, a more functional system was adopted in which each base was organized into a separate numbered unit. As a result, in 1944 the squadron was disbanded as the AAF converted to the AAF Base Unit system. The squadron was replaced by the 343d AAF Base Unit (Replacement Training Unit, Fighter).

=== Air reserve ===
The squadron was reconstituted in 1947 and activated in the reserves at Orchard Place Airport, Illinois on 15 October. It was assigned to the 338th Bombardment Group. The squadron trained under the supervision of Air Defense Command (ADC)'s 141st AAF Base Unit (Reserve Training) (later the 2471st Air Force Reserve Flying Training Center), although it does not appear that it was fully manned or equipped.

In July 1948 Continental Air Command (ConAC) assumed responsibility for managing reserve and Air National Guard units from ADC. The 42d was inactivated when ConAC reorganized its reserve units under the wing base organization system in June 1949. President Truman's reduced 1949 defense budget also required reductions in the number of units in the Air Force, At O'Hare, the 338th Group and its squadrons were inactivated, and most of its personnel transferred to the 437th Troop Carrier Wing.

=== Cold War air defense ===
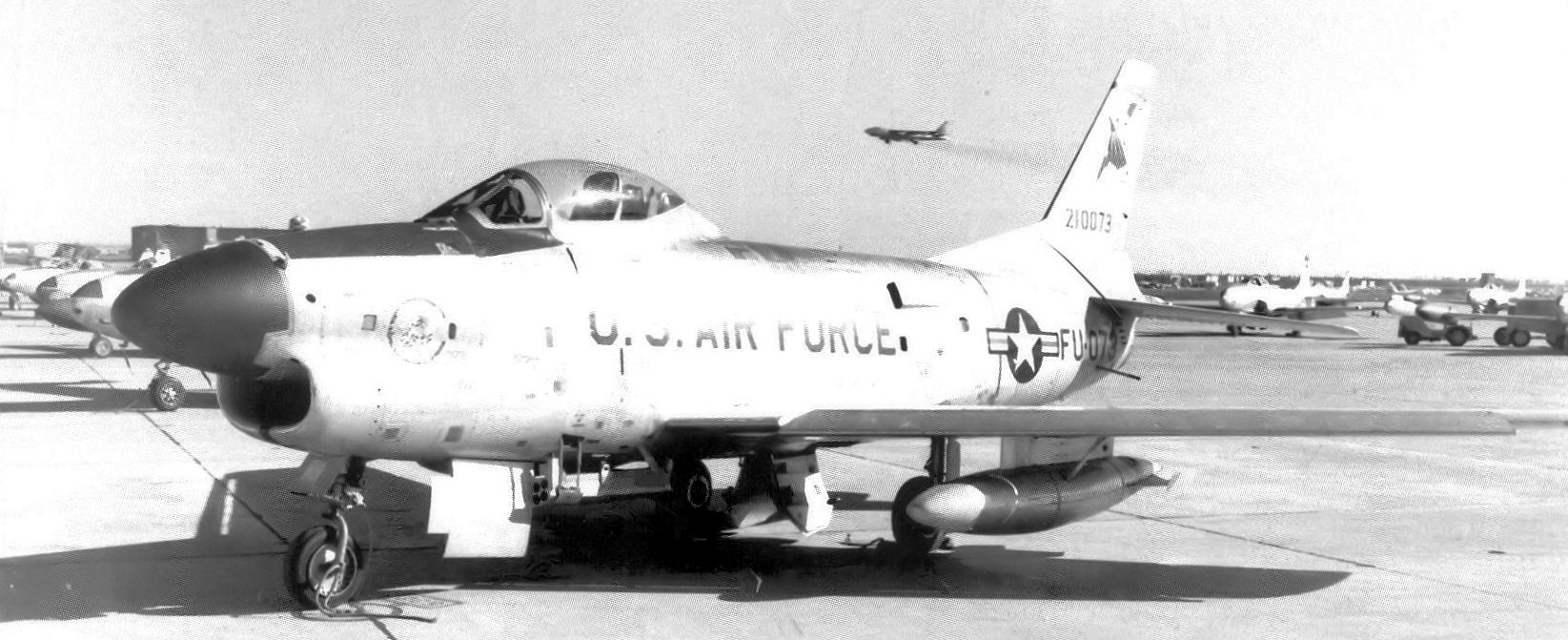
42d Fighter-Interceptor Squadron North American F-86L 52-10073 at Greater Pittsburgh Airport, 1957

In February 1953 the squadron was renamed the 42d Fighter-Interceptor Squadron and activated as part of the 501st Air Defense Group at the same location, now named O'Hare International Airport. At O'Hare it received radar equipped and rocket armed North American F-86 Sabres.

On 18 August 1955, as part of Air Defense Command's Project Arrow, which was designed to bring back on the active list the fighter units which had compiled memorable records in the two world wars., the squadron moved on paper from O'Hare to Greater Pittsburgh Airport, Pennsylvania, where it assumed the mission, personnel and aircraft of the 71st Fighter-Interceptor Squadron, including its radar equipped and rocket armed North American F-86 Sabres. At Pittsburgh was once again assigned to the 54th Fighter Group. The squadron transitioned into data link equipped F-86Ls in the spring of 1957 for interception control through the Semi-Automatic Ground Environment system and flew them until the group and squadron were inactivated in early 1958.

=== Pilot Training ===
The squadron was redesignated the 42d Flying Training Squadron and conducted undergraduate pilot training at Columbus Air Force Base, Mississippi from 1990 to 1991.

== Lineage ==
- Constituted as the 42d Pursuit Squadron (Interceptor) on 20 November 1940

Activated on 15 January 1941
Redesignated 42d Fighter Squadron, Single Engine on 15 May 1942
Disbanded on 1 May 1944

- Reconstituted on 23 September 1947

Activated in the reserve on 15 October 1947
Inactivated on 27 June 1949

- Redesignated 42d Fighter-Interceptor Squadron on 3 February 1953

Activated on 24 February 1953
Inactivated on 8 January 1958

- Redesignated 42d Flying Training Squadron and activated on 25 June 1990

Inactivated on 15 December 1991

=== Assignments ===
- 54th Pursuit Group (later Fighter Group), 15 January 1941 – 1 May 1944
- 338th Bombardment Group, 15 October 1947 – 27 June 1949
- 501st Air Defense Group, 24 February 1953
- 54th Fighter Group, 18 August 1955 – 8 January 1958
- 14th Flying Training Wing, 25 June 1990 – 15 December 1991

=== Stations ===
- Hamilton Field, California, 15 January 1941
- Everett Army Air Field (later Paine Field), Washington, 26 June 1941
- Harding Field, Louisiana, 31 January 1942 (air echelon operated from: Ontario Army Air Field, California, 28 May 28, 1942 – 9 June 1942; Fort Morrow Army Airfield, Kodiak, Alaska Territory, 12 June 1942 – 8 September 1942;
- Adak Army Air Field, Alaska Territory, 10 September 1942 – 12 December 1942
- Hillsborough Army Air Field, Florida, 10 May 1943 – 1 May 1944
- Orchard Place Airport (later O'Hare International Airport), Illinois, 15 October 1947 – 27 June 1949
- O'Hare International Airport, Illinois, 24 February 1953
- Greater Pittsburgh Airport, Pennsylvania, 18 August 1955 – 8 January 1958
- Columbus Air Force Base, Mississippi, 25 June 1990 – 15 December 1991

=== Aircraft ===
- Curtiss P-40 Warhawk, 1941-1942
- Bell P-39 Airacobra, 1943–1943
- North American P-51 Mustang, 1943–1944
- North American F-86D Sabre, 1953–1957
- North American F-86L Sabre, 1957-1958
- Cessna T-37 Tweet, 1990–1991
- Northrop T-38 Talon, 1990–1991
