= 58th Special Operations Wing =

58th Special Operations Wing

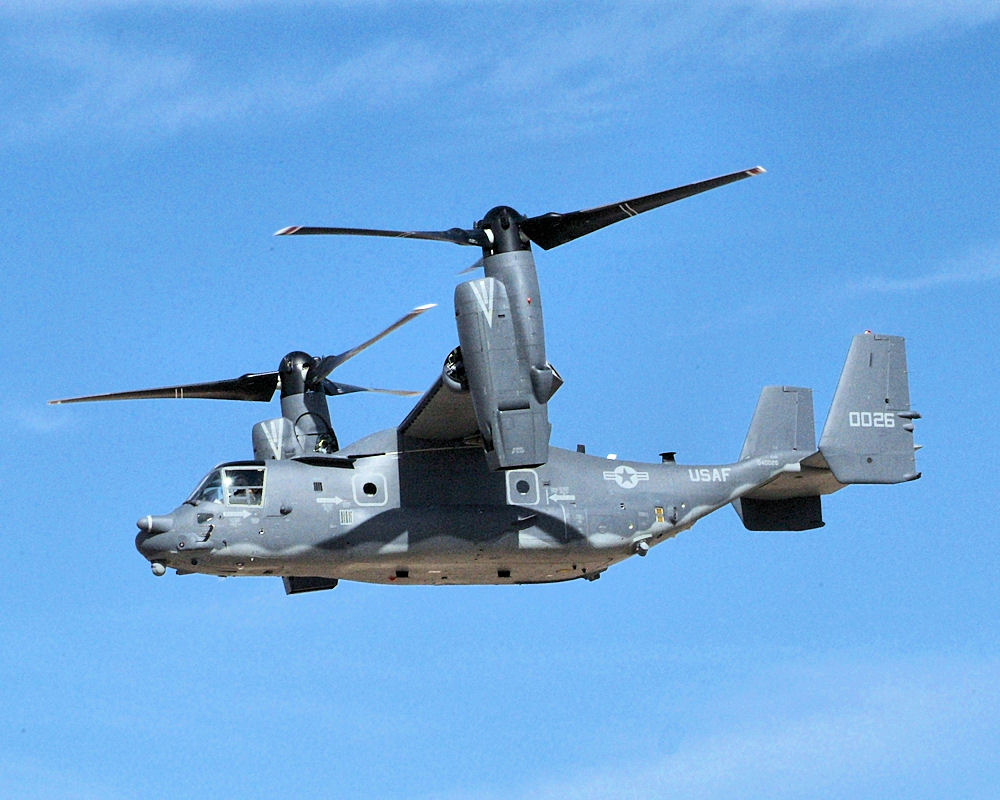
- 58th Wing CV-22 Osprey
- Active: 1952–1958; 1969–present
- Country: United States
- Branch: United States Air Force
- Role: Special Operations Training
- Part of: Air Education and Training Command
- Garrison/HQ: Kirtland Air Force Base
- Motto: Non Revertar Inultus (Latin for 'I Will Not Return Unavenged')
- Engagements: Korean War
- Decorations: Distinguished Unit Citation; Air Force Outstanding Unit Award; Philippine Presidential Unit Citation; Republic of Korea Presidential Unit Citation

Commanders
- Commander: Col. Ryan P. Mittelstet Jeff D. McMaster
- Deputy Commander: Col. Ryan P. Mittelstet
- Command Chief: CMSGT. Shaun Kegin

Insignia
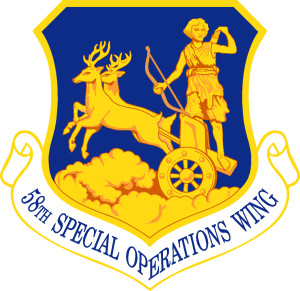
- 58th Special Operations Wing emblem (Note: Approved 18 November 1952.)

The 58th Special Operations Wing (58 SOW) is a unit of the United States Air Force assigned to the Air Education and Training Command (AETC) stationed at Kirtland Air Force Base, New Mexico. It serves as the training organization for Air Force Special Operations Command (AFSOC) and Air Combat Command (ACC) aircrews. Its primary mission involves the formal training of personnel for special operations, combat search and rescue (CSAR), missile site support, and visitor airlift. In addition to its training role, the wing maintains a secondary capability to support domestic search and rescue operations, and humanitarian relief efforts when called upon by federal authorities.

The wing operates a fleet of rotary-wing, tilt-rotor, and fixed-wing aircraft to execute its training mandates. This includes the CV-22 Osprey, HC-130J Combat King II, MC-130J Commando II, UH-1N Twin Huey, and TH-1H Iroquois. Annually, 58 SOW, trains over 2,000 students in more than 100 separate courses, providing specialized instruction in low-level flight, night vision goggle operations and aerial refueling.

Originally constituted as the 58th Fighter Group during World War II, the unit has undergone several re-designations and mission changes.

== Mission ==
The mission of the 58th Special Operations Wing is to train mission-ready United States Air Force special operations, combat search and rescue, missile site support, and UH-1 Distinguished Visitor airlift crews. In addition, the wing conducts survival, evasion, resistance, and escape (SERE) training.

The wing operates eight different types of aircraft: UH-1N, TH-1H, HH-60G, HH-60W, AC-130J, HC-130J, MC-130J and CV-22 totaling more than 60 assigned aircraft. It teaches more than 100 courses in 18 different crew positions, including pilot, combat systems officer, flight engineer, communications system operator, load master, and special mission aviator. The wing also responds to worldwide contingencies and provides search and rescue support to the local community. Additionally, the 58th is responsible for training all SERE students for the Air Force.

Assigned units are:

- 58th Operations Group (58 OG)

The 58th Operations Group is composed of six flying and two support squadrons, as well as three geographically separated pilot training units, one unit at Fort Rucker, Alabama, another unit at MCAS New River, North Carolina, and the third unit at Fairchild AFB, WA.

23d Flying Training Squadron (23 FTS) (TH-1H) (Fort Rucker, AL)
24th Helicopter Squadron (24 HS) (Active Associate to 703d Helicopter Squadron MH-139A) (Maxwell AFB, AL)
36th Rescue Squadron (36th RQS) (UH-1N) (Fairchild AFB, WA)
58th Operations Support Squadron (58 OSS)
58th Training Squadron (58 TRS)
71st Special Operations Squadron (71 SOS) (CV-22)
73rd Special Operations Squadron (73 SOS) (AC-130J)
415th Special Operations Squadron (415th SOS) (HC-130J & MC-130J)
512th Rescue Squadron (512 RQS) (HH-60G & HH-60W)
58 Operations Group Detachment 1 (MV-22, MCAS New River, NC)
58 Operations Group Detachment 2 (UH-1N)
58th Maintenance Group (58 MXG)
58th Maintenance Squadron (58 MXS)
58th Maintenance Operations Squadron (58 MOS)
58th Aircraft Maintenance Squadron (58 AMXS)
336 Training Group (336 TRG) (SERE, Fairchild AFB, WA)

== History ==
=== History and Prehistory ===
This group was established as the 58 Fighter-Bomber Wing on 25 June 1952. It was activated on 10 July 1952, in Japan, absorbing the personnel and equipment of the Texas Air National Guard 136th Fighter-Bomber Group. It traces its roots directly back to the 58th Pursuit Group, established on 20 November 1940 and activated 15 January 1941 in Michigan.

=== Korean War ===
The wing moved to K-2 Air Base, later known as Taegu Air Base, South Korea, in August 1952, where it provided close air support for United Nations ground forces. Often flying into North Korea's "MiG Alley," the 58th targeted airfields, railways, enemy positions, bridges, dams, electric power plants and vehicles. In 1952 and early 1953 the wing flew interdiction and close air support missions as well as attacking special strategic targets such as military schools, dams, and port facilities. Having entered the war with Republic F-84D Thunderjets, the wing transitioned in late 1952 to the new F-84G model, designed with more speed and range. The wing attacked the major supply port of Sinuiju in September, inflicting heavy damage without loss of personnel or aircraft. Combined with other fighter-bomber units, it attacked the Kumgang Political School at Odong-ni, Kumgang County in October 1952 and the North Korean tank and infantry school at Kangso in February 1953.

Later, truce talks between North Korea and the United Nations stalled in the spring of 1953. As a result, the Air Force began attacking previously excluded targets in the north. On 13 May 1953, Thunderjets from the 58 FBW struck the Toksan Dam, near Pyongyang, causing a torrential flood. Floodwaters from the breached dam destroyed ten bridges, ruined several square miles of rice crops, flooded over 1,000 buildings and rendered the Sunan Airfield inoperable. Three days later, the wing attacked the Chosan irrigation dam with similar results. The Far East Air Forces commander later credited the 58 FBW, stating that the destruction of the Toksan and Chosan irrigation dams resulted in the enemy coming to the truce talks in earnest. On 27 July 1953, it attacked the runway at Kanggye and, with the 49th Fighter-Bomber Wing, bombed Sunan Airfield for the final action of the war. The wing earned a second DUC for its actions in the last three months of the war.

By the end of December 1952, 18 members of the 58 FBW had died in combat. According to recent listings from the Defense Prisoner of War/Missing Personnel Office, the fates of 14 members assigned to the 58th are still unaccounted for.

The wing served in three Korean War campaigns and earned the Republic of Korea Presidential Unit Citation for its actions in combat. After the armistice, the 58th provided air defense for South Korea and deployed tactical components on a rotational basis to Taiwan from January 1955 – February 1957. From 15 March 1953, to 8 November 1954, the 58th tested a "reinforced" wing organization, exercising direct control of the tactical components of the attached wings. They switched to F-86 Sabres in 1954 and relocated to Osan Air Base in 1955. They were inactivated on 1 July 1958.

In October 1958 it was re-armed with the TM-61C (Matador) tactical missile to provide a deterrent against attacks on South Korea, a mission that continued until 1962.

=== Fighter Training Wing ===
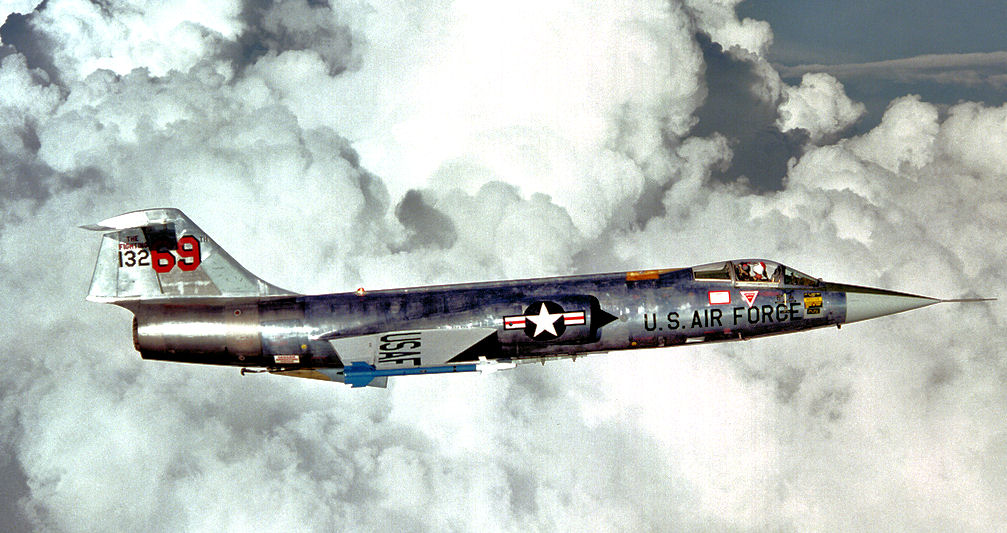
58th Tactical Fighter Training Wing Lockheed F-104G Starfighter (USAF serial number 63-13269) during a training flight on 1 August 1979, armed with two (training) AIM-9J Sidewinder air-to-air-missiles.

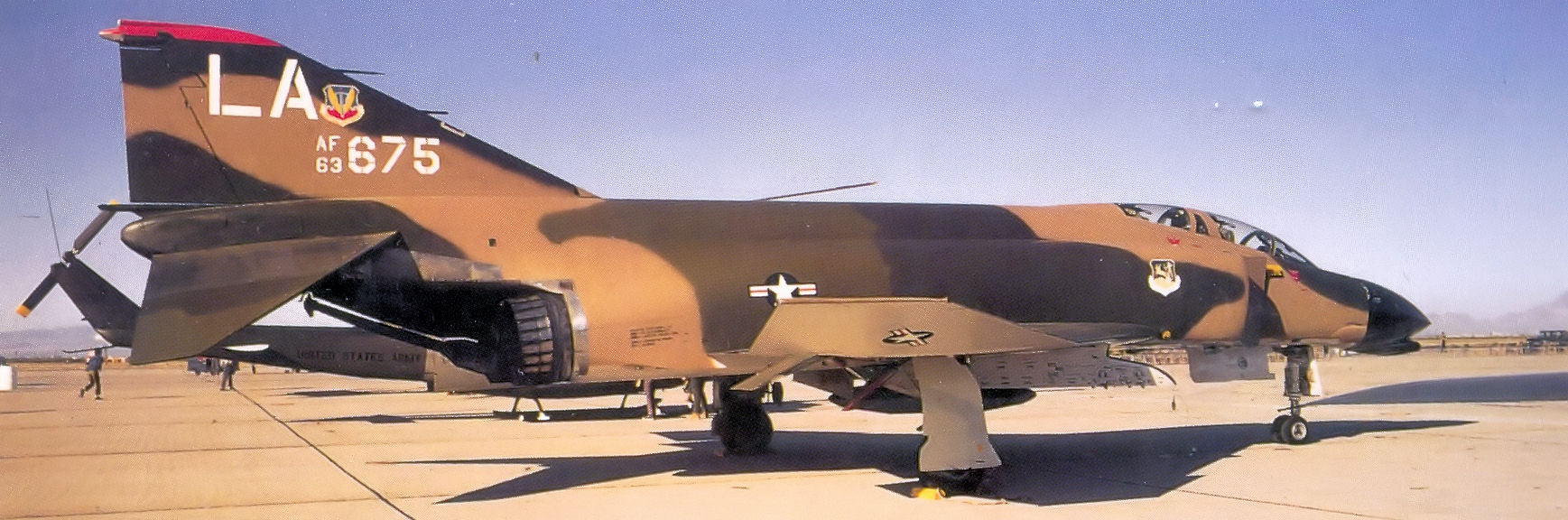
550th Tactical Fighter Training Squadron McDonnell F-4C-21-MC Phantom 63–7675, Luke AFB, Arizona, 1972

On 22 August 1969, the Air Force re-designated the wing as the 58th Tactical Fighter Training Wing and activated it under Tactical Air Command at Luke Air Force Base, Arizona, where it absorbed the personnel and equipment of the 4510th Combat Crew Training Wing. The wing conducted training of U.S., German Air Force, and other friendly foreign-nation aircrew and support personnel, and participated in various operations and tactical exercises while operating at Luke Air Force Base until 1 April 1977, when it became the 58th Tactical Training Wing. In November 1974, they received the first F-15 Eagle with President Ford included in the welcoming committee. It managed Tactical Air Command's Central Instructor School from 1971 to 1981. On 29 June 1982, they graduated the last F-4 class. Beginning in early 1983, the wing performed tactical fighter training for U.S. and foreign aircrews in the General Dynamics F-16 Fighting Falcon (adopted on 6 December 1982).

They were redesignated in 1991 as the 58th Fighter Wing. The 58th deployed support personnel to Europe to augment United States Air Forces Europe units during the Gulf War.

In the fall of 1991, its primary mission expanded to include tactical training in the F-15E Strike Eagle all-weather strike fighter. By 1994, the wing had trained pilots and support personnel from the Netherlands, South Korea, Turkey, Pakistan, the Republic of Singapore, Norway, Greece, Egypt, Indonesia, and Venezuela.

=== Operations at Kirtland ===
On 1 April 1994, they became the 58th Special Operations Wing. That same month, the wing's mission changed from the training of USAF and Allied fighter pilots to the training of USAF helicopter aircrews, and it moved to Kirtland Air Force Base. It also trained crews in special operations aircraft, including helicopters and modified C-130 Hercules aircraft. It performed pararescue training and search and rescue missions as well. Additionally, the wing trained for missile site support and airlift for distinguished visitors. At the same time, the wing continued to deploy personnel worldwide for contingency and combat operations.

Beyond training, this unit also participated in local and regional search and rescue operations. They are called up several times a year to support rescue operations; to date, they have participated in over 300 of such operations, aiding in the rescue of at least 225 lives.

The 58th airlifted a federal task force to Pennsylvania to investigate the crash site of the fourth airliner following the 11 September 2001 terrorist attacks. Since that time the 58th has deployed personnel and equipment to support Operation Enduring Freedom and Operation Iraqi Freedom. Since September 11, they deployed over 200 personnel. Their first casualty recorded during this time occurred on November 23, 2003, during a crash in Afghanistan that killed helicopter pilot Major Steven Plumhoff.

Today, the wing trains aircrews in the MC-130J Commando II and the CV-22 Osprey for the Air Force Special Operations Command; the HC-130J Combat King II and the HH-60G Pavehawk for the Air Combat Command, Pacific Air Forces, and United States Air Forces in Europe; the UH-1N Huey or Iroquois for Air Force Space Command; the TH-1H Huey Iroquois for initial helicopter flight crew qualification; and those aircrew operationally gained to those commands from the Air Force Reserve Command and the Air National Guard. They received the first Osprey on March 20, 2006.

== Lineage ==
- Established as the 58th Fighter-Bomber Wing on 25 June 1952
- Activated on 10 July 1952
- Inactivated on 1 July 1958
- Re-designated 58th Tactical Fighter Training Wing on 22 August 1969
- Activated on 15 October 1969
- Re-designated 58th Tactical Training Wing on 1 April 1977
- Re-designated 58th Fighter Wing on 1 October 1991
- Re-designated 58th Special Operations Wing on 1 April 1994

=== Assignments ===
- Tactical Air Command, 10 July 1952 (attached to Fifth Air Force until 28 February 1955, Korean Air Division, Provisional, 314th, 1 – 14 March 1955, 314th Air Division, 15 March 1955 – 31 December 1956)
- Far East Air Forces, 1 January 1957
- 314th Air Division, 1 January 1957 – 1 July 1958
- Twelfth Air Force, 15 October 1969
- Tactical Training, Luke, 1 April 1977
- 832d Air Division, 1 December 1980
- Twelfth Air Force, 1 October 1991
- Nineteenth Air Force, 1 July 1993
- Air Education and Training Command, 12 July 2012 – present

=== Components ===
Wings

- 49th Fighter-Bomber Wing: attached 16 – 31 March 1953
- 474th Fighter-Bomber Wing: attached 1 April 1953 – 8 November 1954

Groups

- 49th Fighter-Bomber Group: attached 16 – 31 March 1953
- 58th Fighter-Bomber Group (later 58th Operations Group): 10 July 1952 – 8 November 1957; 1 October 1991 – present
- 474th Fighter-Bomber Group: attached 1 April 1953 – 24 November 1954

Squadrons

- 23rd Flying Training Squadron: 1 April 1994 – present
- 69th Fighter-Bomber Squadron (later 69th Tactical Fighter Training Squadron): attached 1 March - 7 November 1957, assigned 8 November 1957 – 1 July 1958, 15 October 1969 – 16 March 1983
- 71st Special Operations Squadron: 20 May 2005 – present
- 310th Fighter-Bomber Squadron (later 310th Tactical Fighter Training Squadron): attached 1 Mar - 7 November 1957, assigned 8 November 1957 – 1 July 1958; assigned 15 December 1969 – 1 October 1991.
- 311th Fighter-Bomber Squadron (later 311th Tactical Fighter Training Squadron): attached 1 Mar - 7 November 1957, assigned 8 November 1957 – 1 July 1958; assigned 18 January 1970 – 1 October 1991.
- 312th Tactical Fighter Training Squadron: 1 October 1984 – 18 January 1991
- 314th Tactical Fighter Training Squadron: 1 October 1986 – 1 October 1991
- 333d Tactical Fighter Training Squadron: 22 March-31 July 1971
- 415th Special Operations Squadron: 12 September 2011 – present
- 418th Tactical Fighter Training Squadron: 15 October 1969 – 1 October 1976
- 425th Tactical Fighter Training Squadron: 15 October 1969 – 22 August 1979
- 426th Tactical Fighter Training Squadron: 18 January 1970 – 1 January 1981
- 461st Tactical Fighter Training Squadron: 1 July 1977 – 29 August 1979
- 512th Special Operations Squadron (later 512th Rescue Squadron): 25 March 1994 – present
- 550th Special Operations Squadron: 1 April 1994 – 29 September 2016
- 550th Tactical Fighter Training Squadron: 1 April 1970 – 29 August 1979
- 555th Tactical Fighter Training Squadron: 5 July – 29 August 1979
- 4461st Tactical Fighter Training Squadron: 23 June 1976 – 1 July 1977
- 4511th Combat Crew Training Squadron: 15 October 1969 – 18 January 1970
- 4514th Combat Crew Training Squadron: 15 October – 15 December 1969
- 4515th Combat Crew Training Squadron: 15 October 1969 – 18 January 1970
- 4516th Combat Crew Training Squadron: 15 October 1969 – 18 January 1970

=== Stations ===
- Itazuke Air Base, Japan, 10 July 1952
- Taegu Air Base (K-9), South Korea, August 1952
- Osan-Ni Air Base (later Osan Air Base), South Korea, 15 March 1955 – 1 July 1958
- Luke Air Force Base, Arizona, 15 October 1969
- Kirtland Air Force Base, New Mexico, 1 April 1994 – present

=== Aircraft ===
- Republic F-84 Thunderjet, 1952–1954
- North American F-86 Sabre, 1954–1958
- North American F-100 Super Sabre, 1969–1971
- Lockheed F-104 Starfighter, 1969–1983
- Lockheed TF-104 Starfighter, 1969–1983
- Northrop F-5C Freedom Fighter, 1969–1979
- Northrop F-5E Tiger II, 1969–1979
- LTV A-7D Corsair II, 1969–1971
- McDonnell F-4 Phantom II, 1971–1982
- McDonnell Douglas F-15 Eagle, 1974–1979
- McDonnell Douglas TF-15 Eagle, 1974–1979
- General Dynamics F-16 Fighting Falcon, 1982–1991
- Bell UH-1H Huey, 1994–present
- Bell TH-1H Twin Huey, 1994–present
- Bell UH-1N Twin Huey, 1994–present
- Sikorsky HH-60 Pave Hawk, 1994–present
- Sikorsky MH-53J Pave Low, unknown–2007
- Bell Boeing CV-22 Osprey, 2005–present
- Lockheed HC-130P Combat King, 1994–2016
- Lockheed MC-130P Combat Shadow, 1996–2013
- Lockheed MC-130H Combat Talon II, 1992–2016
- Lockheed HC-130J Combat King II, 2011–present
- Lockheed MC-130J Commando II, 2011–present
- Lockheed AC-130J Ghostrider. 2024–present
