= Porac Airfield =

World War II airfield in Pampanga, Philippines

Porac Airfield
- Part of Fifth Air Force
- Porac Airfield (Philippines)

Site information
- Type: Military airfield
- Controlled by: United States Army Air Forces

Location
- Coordinates: 15°04′21.43″N 120°32′32.95″E

Site history
- Built: 1940
- In use: 1940-1945

Porac Airfield was a World War II airfield located at Porac to the east of the Porac River in the province of Pampanga on the island of Luzon in the Philippines. It was closed after the war.

== History ==
Porac Airfield was a single runway airfield prior to the war. A taxiway ran parallel to the runway, with a dispersal area near the northern end of the strip. It was used by the Japanese during their occupation. Late in the war, after liberation, it was used by combined Filipino and American military units in early 1945, such as the USAAF 58th Fighter Group (18 April-10 July 1945), and the 375th Troop Carrier Group (20 May–August 1945). Porac was also used by the 201st Mexican Expeditionary Air Force, flying P-47 Thunderbolts.

The airfield was abandoned after the war and is now part of the town, with the runway being used as a road.

== See also ==
- USAAF in the Southwest Pacific
