= Hillsborough Army Air Field =

Hillsborough Army Airfield
- Part of Army Air Force Training Command
- Tampa, Florida
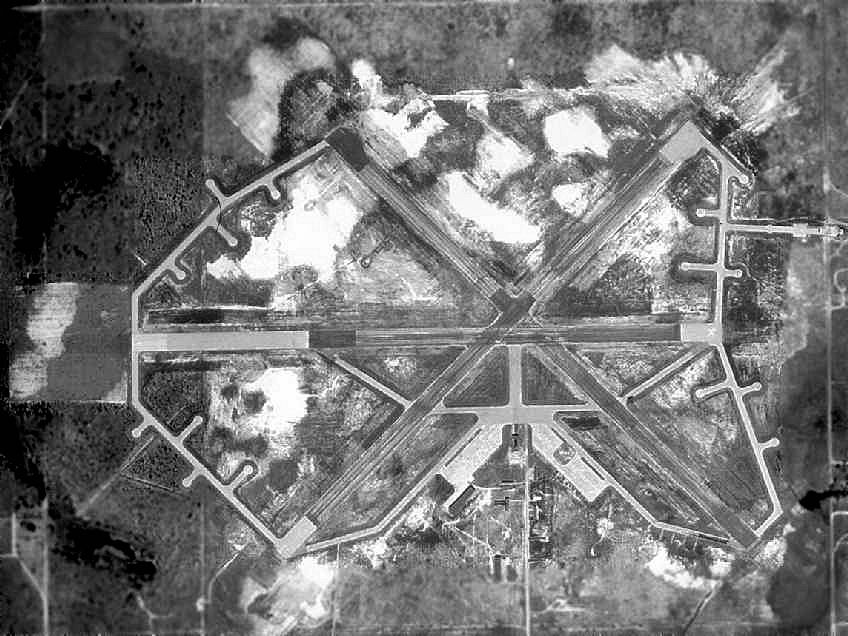
- 15 January 1948 photo

Site information
- Type: Army Airfield
- Controlled by: United States Army Air Forces

Location
- Location within Florida
- Coordinates: 28°02′50″N 082°25′06″W

Site history
- Built: 1943
- In use: 1943-1945

Garrison information
- Garrison: Army Air Force Training Command

Hillsborough Army Airfield is a former World War II United States Army Air Forces airfield which was located about 7 miles north of downtown Tampa, Florida, near Temple Terrace, Florida. After World War II it served as a civilian airport called Henderson Hillsborough International Airport for several years until it closed.

== History ==
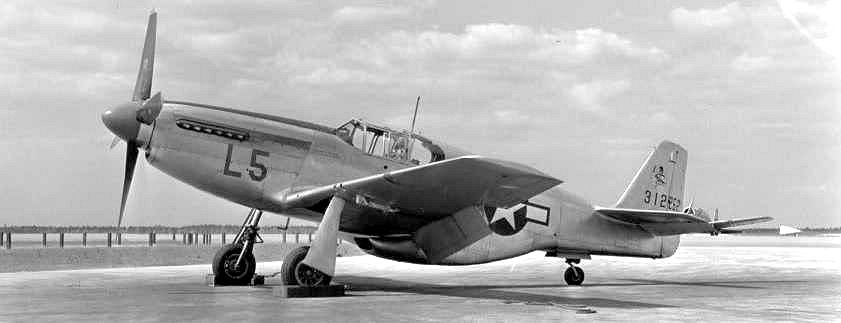
P-51B-1-NA 43-12252 42d Fighter Squadron (Single Engine). Hillsborough Army Airfield, Florida 17 April 1944

Hillsborough AAF was built by the United States Army Air Forces about 1943 and its primary mission was to be an auxiliary airfield for both Drew and MacDill Army Airfields. It was assigned to the Third Air Force, III Fighter Command. Hillsborough Army Airfield had three runways (NE/SW, NW/SE & E/W) of about 5,200' in length and several hangars along the west side of the airfield.

The initial mission of Hillsborough was as a support and training overflow airfield; also being used for emergency landings of students assigned to the main bases. It also operated a school for administrative training of junior officers. The 42d Fighter Squadron was assigned to Hillsborough on 10 May 1943, equipped with P-51 Mustangs. The 42d was detached from Bartow Army Airfield. With advanced combat fighter pilot training being moved out of Drew Field, it was moved to Hillsborough. The base normally had about 28 airplanes at the field at one time.

In an administrative reorganization by HQ Army Air Force, on 1 May 1944, numbered training units in the Zone of the Interior (ZI) (Continental United States) were re-designated as "Army Air Force Base Units". The 42d was re-designated as "Section T, 343d Army Air Forces Base Unit Replacement Training Unit, Fighter. In June 1944, two more squadrons of P-51s were assigned, "S" and "FT".

On 10 May 1945, training was ended at the base, and the 343d AAFBU was discontinued. Personnel and equipment were reassigned to IV Fighter Command, 473d AAFBU and transferred to Porterville Army Airfield, California. The base was officially closed on 23 May and transferred to Air Technical Service Command for disposal.

After World War II, Hillsborough was reused as a civilian airport, known as Henderson Airport, however it was closed in the late 1950s.

The University of South Florida campus began construction in 1957 on a site adjacent to the north side of Henderson Airport, and the Busch Gardens theme park was opened in 1959 just south of the airport. The surviving runways are used as a driver training area by Busch Gardens to instruct new drivers on some of their vehicles.

Today the airfield is all but unrecognizable in the urbanized area of Tampa. The center of the airport, with two cris-crossing runways in an X shape, was visible from satellite images until development obliterated the X in 2009. Only a small strip of runway survives as a fenced parking area northeast of the intersection of N 40th Street and E Bougainvillea Avenue. The Tampa Bay regional headquarters of the Florida Department of Transportation building is located on the site of the northeastern runway. Mel's Hot Dogs, a popular Tampa eatery, states on its website that it occupies the last remaining structure from the World War II army air base.

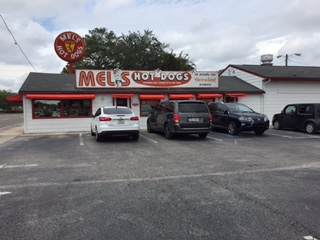
Mel's Hot Dogs is the last surviving structure of the Hillsborough Army Air Field in Tampa, Florida

== See also ==
- Florida World War II Army Airfields
