= III Fighter Command =

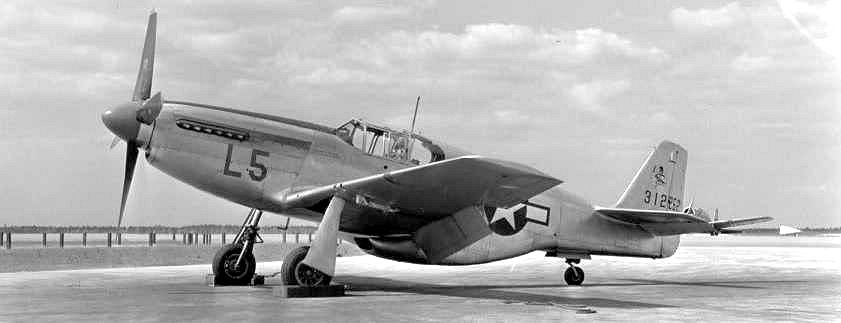
- P-51 Mustang of the command's 42d Fighter Squadron at Hillsborough Army Air Field in 1944 (Note: Aircraft is North American P-51B-1-NA Mustang, serial 43-12252. The squadron was part of the 54th Fighter Group.)
- Active: 1941-1946
- Country: United States
- Branch: United States Army; United States Air Force
- Role: Command and training of fighter units

Commanders
- Notable commanders: Clarence L. Tinker; Ralph Royce

The III Fighter Command is an inactive United States Air Force unit. Its last assignment was at MacDill Field, Florida. It was inactivated on 8 April 1946.

== History ==
=== Background ===
GHQ Air Force (GHQ, AF) had been established with two major combat functions, to maintain a striking force against long range targets, and the air defense of the United States. In the spring of 1941, the War Department established four strategic defense areas and GHQ, AF reorganized its Southeast Air District as 3rd Air Force with responsibility for air defense planning and organization in the southeastern. 3rd Air Force activated 3rd Interceptor Command at Drew Field, Florida in 1941, under the command of Major General Walter H. Frank. The command's initial tactical component was the 8th Pursuit Wing.

=== Air defense ===
The attack on Pearl Harbor put all units on heightened alert. The command was charged with control of "active agents" for air defense in its area of responsibility, which included interceptor aircraft, antiaircraft artillery and barrage balloons. Civilian organizations provided air raid warnings and enforced blackouts and came under the authority of the Office of Civilian Defense and the command worked "feverishly" to create a ground observer corps as elements of its Aircraft Warning Service. However, it soon became apparent that having two commands responsible for air defense in the Eastern Theater of Operations was impractical. 1st Interceptor Command was given the mission of defending the East and Gulf coasts, while 3rd concentrated on the training mission starting early in 1942. Although the command retained responsibility for air defense on the Gulf coast west of the Apalachicola River, no "vital air defense zone" was established for this area, as it was for the Pacific and East coasts.

=== Unit and crew training ===
The command trained fighter organizations and personnel. By the end of 1942, the command's training consisted almost entirely of Replacement Training Units (RTU).

The command was inactivated in April 1946. It was transferred in inactive status to the newly independent United States Air Force in September 1947, and was disbanded in October 1948.

== Lineage ==
- Constituted as the 3rd Interceptor Command on 26 May 1941 (Note: Maurer indicates unit was constituted as the "III" Interceptor Command. However, the unit was constituted and activated with an arabic number in its name. The use of roman numerals to designate Army Air Forces combat commands did not begin until September 1942. "Air Force Historical Research Agency Organizational Reconds: Types of USAF Organizations". Air Force History Index. 9 January 2008..)

Activated 17 June 1941 (Note: Maurer indicates that there is a question whether the command was activated on this date or not until about 14 July. Maurer, p. 440.)
Redesignated 3rd Fighter Command on 15 May 1942
Redesignated III Fighter Command c. 18 September 1942
Inactivated on 8 April 1946
Disbanded on 8 October 1948

=== Assignments ===
- 3rd Air Force (later Third Air Force), 17 June 1941
- Fifteenth Air Force 21 March 1946 – 8 April 1946

=== Components ===
Wings

- 8th Pursuit Wing (later 8th Fighter Wing), assigned c. 1 July – 1 November 1941; attached 28 July – c. 28 October 1942
- 19th Bombardment Wing, attached 24 July 1942 – 28 September 1942
- 22d Bombardment Training Wing, 6–15 August 1943

Groups

- 2nd Air Commando Group: 22 April – c. 12 November 1944
- 3rd Air Commando Group: 1 May – c. 1 December 1944
- 31st Pursuit Group (later 31st Fighter Group): 18 April – 9 June 1942
- 48th Bombardment Group (later 48th Fighter-Bomber Group): 6 August 1943 – 31 March 1944 (attached to I Tactical Air Division 10 September 1943 – 14 January 1944) (Note: Robertson says attachment was to I Ground Air Support Command, but the command had been redesignated a division by this time. Maurer, Combat Units, pp. 440-41.)
- 49th Pursuit Group: attached 9 August 1941, assigned 2 October 1941 – February 1942
- 50th Pursuit Group (later 50th Fighter Group): 2 October 1941 – 28 May 1942
- 52nd Fighter Group: 26 November 1942 – 1 May 1944
- 54th Pursuit Group (later 54th Fighter Group), 18 April 1942 – 1 May 1944
- 56th Pursuit Group: attached 17 June 1941, assigned 2 October 1941 – 15 January 1942
- 58th Pursuit Group (later 58th Fighter Group): 2 October 1941 – 17 October 1942
- 59th Fighter Group: by September 1943 – 1 May 1944
- 80th Pursuit Group (later 80th Fighter Group): 9 February – 20 June 1942
- 85th Bombardment Group (later 85th Fighter-Bomber Group), 6 August 1943 – 1 May 1944
- 405th Fighter-Bomber Group, 15 August 1943 – 6 March 1944
- 408th Fighter-Bomber Group, 15 August – 10 November 1943, 12 February – 24 March 1944

Squadrons

- 32d Reconnaissance Squadron (Fighter): 15 August – 1 September 1943
- 34th Reconnaissance Squadron (Fighter): 15 August – 1 September 1943
- 99th Fighter Squadron: attached 19 August 1942 – 24 April 1943
- 403d Fighter Squadron: 15 March – 7 August 1943
- 439th Fighter Squadron: 22 February 1943 – 1 March 1944

Other

- 555th Signal Aircraft Warning Battalion: 4 July – 8 October 1942

=== Stations ===
- Drew Field, Florida, 17 June 1941
- MacDill Field, Florida, c. 1 December 1945 – 8 April 1946
