= Dale Mabry Army Airfield =

World War II United States Army Airfield

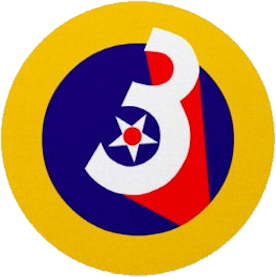
Dale Mabry Army Airfield
- Part of Third Air Force
- Located near: Tallahassee, Florida
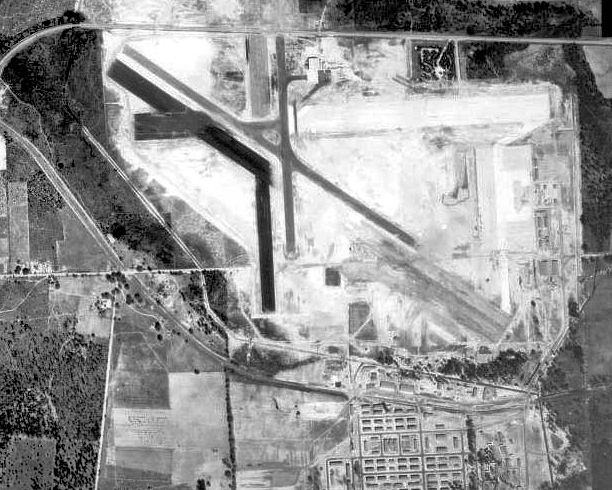
- 1942 airphoto

Location
- Coordinates: 30°26′15″N 084°20′14″W

Site history
- In use: 1940–1946

MacDill Field Martin B-26 Marauder lands for visit

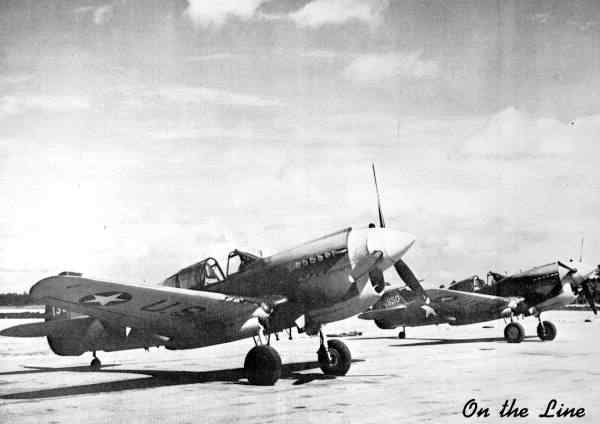
58th Fighter Group P-40 Warhawks on the flight line

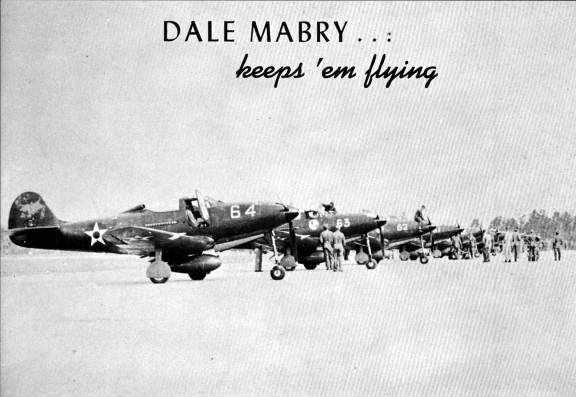
P-39 Airacobras assigned for pilot training

Transient Navy F6F Hellcat

Dale Mabry Army Airfield, was a World War II United States Army Air Force located at the Dale Mabry Field airport in Tallahassee, Florida. The military airfield closed in 1946 and the airport was returned to civil use.

== History ==
The military use of Tallahassee Dale Mabry Field began in 1938 when the United States Army Air Corps established a contract flying school at the airport. In 1940 U.S. Senator Claude Pepper and Florida Governor Spessard Holland influenced the Army to make Dale Mabry Field a United States Army Air Force airfield as part of the buildup of the military prior to the United States entry into World War II. The airfield was named after Captain Dale Mabry of Tallahassee, who during World War I, experimented with the use of Balloons.

In October 1940 military activity began with the construction of a railroad siding and drainage improvements to overcome the swamp conditions at the site. Hundreds of laborers began clearing swampland for temporary quarters for Dale Mabry Army Airfield. The need for a place to train pilots prompted the federal government to set a 90-day completion deadline and construction began that month. The Army constructed three concrete runways to serve their needs. The field was described as having 2 paved runways. One runway was 4,000 feet (1,200 m) running northwest to southeast and a second was 2,500-foot (760 m) running north to south. Another 3,400-foot (1,000 m) sand & sod runway ran east to west. In addition, several sub-bases and auxiliary airfields were assigned:

- Thomasville Army Airfield (Georgia)
- Harris Neck Army Airfield (Georgia)
- Perry Army Airfield
- Carrabelle Flight Strip#2

The base became a nearly self-sufficient city, with several runways, barracks, officers’ quarters, mess hall, hangars, a hospital, a church and a bowling alley. Originally 530 acres (214 ha), the airfield grew to 1,720 acres (696 ha) and 133 buildings during the course of the war. Training activity peaked in mid-1944 with base complement averaging 1,300 officers, 3,000 enlisted men & women, and 800 civilian employees. Students at Dale Mabry also used a gunnery base at Alligator Point and a bombing range at Sopchoppy on the Gulf for their training needs.

In addition to being a military airfield, Eastern Airlines and National Airlines continued to use Mabry despite being closed to general aviation during World War II.

=== Initial use ===
The field was activated on 13 January 1941 and placed under the jurisdiction of the Southeast Air District (later Third Air Force). It was assigned to the III Interceptor (later Fighter) Command on 17 June 1941. The 42d Base Headquarters and Air Base Squadron was the host military unit at the new field.

Construction delays limited the operational use of the field during 1941. The first flying organization at the field was the 53d Pursuit Group (Interceptor) which moved from MacDill Field near Tampa in December 1941. The 53d remained briefly at Dale Mabry, moving to Charleston Army Airfield, South Carolina at the end of the month for overseas movement to Panama as part of the buildup of the defenses of the Panama Canal.

=== Fighter training ===
The first unit to train at Dale Mabry Field was the 79th Fighter Group, which was formed at the field in early February 1942 and equipped with Curtiss P-40 Warhawks. It then moved to Morris Field, North Carolina, in early May 1942. It was replaced by the 81st Fighter Group which moved from Morris Field in early May. The 81st was equipped with Bell P-39 Airacobras. It trained until the end of June before moving to Muroc Field in California, in preparation for deployment to the South Pacific. However it was instead, deployed to Egypt. The 58th Fighter Group, which had arrived in March 1942, was the first Operational Training Unit (OTU) permanently assigned to Dale Mabry AAF. It was equipped with Curtiss P-40 Warhawks and provided advanced combat training to new pilots which had graduated from Training Command advanced flight schools who were assigned to the 79th and 81st Fighter Groups. In June 1942, the 58th was chosen to become a combat group and it was moved to Morris Field in July for combat training and also deployed to Egypt.

With the 58th being prepared for overseas deployment, III Fighter Command formed the 338th Fighter Group at Mabry to replace the 58th FG. With the P-40s being taken by the outgoing group, four squadrons P-39 Airacobras were assigned to the Group for the training mission. However Dale Mabry was unable to support the large number of aircraft and in September 1942, the 305th Fighter Squadron was reassigned to Sarasota Army Airfield to be a training unit while remaining under the control of the 338th FG. On 13 June 1943, the 307th and 441st Fighter Squadrons were transferred to the Perry Army Airfield sub-base of Dale Mabry to conduct training, while remaining under the control of Group Headquarters. With the reassignment of the two squadrons to Perry, the 305th returned to Dale Mabry, with the number of training squadrons at the base returning to two (305th and 306th).

Sometime in 1942, the 99th Fighter Squadron under the command of Lt. Col. Benjamin Davis received advanced training at Mabry Field. In 1942 and 1944 Chinese Air Force & Free French Air Force Air cadets trained at Dale Mabry Field, using the gunnery range at Alligator Point and the bombing range at Sopchoppy.

Combat training was upgraded to the Republic P-47 Thunderbolt in the fall of 1943, as well as P-51 Mustangs as soon as they became available. In an administrative reorganization by HQ Army Air Force, on 1 May 1944, numbered training units in the Zone of the Interior (ZI) (Continental United States) were re-designated as "Army Air Force Base Units". At Dale Mabry, the 338th Fighter Group was inactivated, and replaced by the 335th Army Air Force Base Unit (Replacement Training Unit, Fighter), the squadrons being designated as "A" and "B".

Several bases in Florida, including Dale Mabry, served as detention centers for German prisoners-of-war (POWs) in the latter part of 1944 and 1945. At its apex, 150 POWs were interned at the base. Air Service Command used Dale Mabry for training of numerous Service Groups from 1941 until 1943 prior to their overseas deployment. In addition Air Materiel Command established a maintenance sub-depot to maintain the training aircraft assigned to the base.

=== Closure ===
III Fighter Command fighter training ended on 31 May 1945, and the 335th AAFBU was converted into a Ground Training Unit. With the Japanese Surrender in August 1945, demobilization became the major activity at the base, with many personnel being separated and returning to civilian life.

In the fall of 1945, jurisdiction of Dale Mabry AAF was transferred to Air Technical Service Command (ATSC), whose mission was the transfer of any useful military equipment to other bases around the country. The base was closed and declared as surplus in 1946, being was turned over to the War Assets Administration (WAA) for disposal and return to civil use. The Air Force retained a communications facility at the base until March 1946 when the airport was fully returned to Civil Control.

Over 8,000 pilots from the United States as well as Europe and China trained here in P-39s, P-40s, P-47s and P-51s. There is a historic site marker now at the edge of the NW/SE runway near the point where planes took off or landed. Over a dozen pilots died in accidents while learning how to fire at targets such as a giant, plywood “bull’s eye” at Alligator Point to the south. During 1943, 79,000 family members came to Tallahassee, then a town of 16,000, to visit pilots-in-training.

Today, some sections of the base's asphalt runway are still visible, as are several concrete tie-down pads. On November 16, 2016 a live air strike bomb was unearthed during construction entangled in the roots of a tree in what is now known as Frenchtown. The location was near the boundaries of the old base. A special crew dispatched by The 325th Explosive Ordnance Disposal Flight out of Tyndall Air Force Base in Panama City, Florida determined that the course of action was to detonate the bomb in place to neutralize it and did so safely.

=== Major units assigned ===
- 79th Fighter Group, 9 February – 1 May 1942
- 81st Fighter Group, 1 May – 28 June 1942
- 53d Fighter Group, 26 November 1942 – 7 January 1943
- 58th Fighter Group, 4 March – June 1942
- 338th Fighter Group, 22 July 1942 – 1 May 1944

Re-designated: 335th Army Air Force Base Unit (Replacement Training Unit, Fighter), 1 May 1944 – 31 August 1945

== See also ==
- Florida World War II Army Airfields
