= List of airfields of the United States Army Air Forces Third Air Force =

The list of Airfields of the United States Army Air Forces Third Air Force is as follows:

Tactical Airfields

- Dale Mabry Army Airfield
- Dyersburg Army Air Base
- Hattiesburg Bobby L. Chain Municipal Airport
- Hesler-Noble Field
- Hunter Army Airfield
- Imeson Field
- Lakeland Army Air Field
- MacDill Field
- Page Field Army Airfield
- Pinellas Army Air Field
- Venice Army Air Field

Group Training Stations

- Aiken Army Air Field
- Alachua Army Air Field
- Anderson Regional Airport
- Barnwell Regional Airport
- Beauregard Regional Airport
- Blackstone Army Airfield
- Brownwood Regional Airport
- Columbia Army Air Base
- Congree Army Airfield
- Dale Mabry Army Airfield
- Demopolis Army Airfield
- Dyersburg Army Air Base
- Florence Regional Airport
- Gainesville Municipal Airport
- Greenville Army Air Base
- Hatbox Field
- Hattiesburg Bobby L. Chain Municipal Airport
- Hesler-Noble Field
- Hillsborough Army Air Field
- Hunter Army Airfield
- Lake Charles Army Air Field
- Lakeland Army Air Field
- Lowcountry Regional Airport
- MacDill Field
- North Auxiliary Airfield
- Page Field Army Airfield
- Peterson Field
- Pinellas Army Air Field
- Punta Gorda Airport (Florida)
- Thomasville Regional Airport
- Venice Army Air Field
- Waycross–Ware County Airport
- Will Rogers Field

Replacement Training Stations

- Alexandria Army Air Base
- Beauregard Regional Airport
- Blackstone Army Airfield
- Brooksville Army Airfield
- Brownwood Regional Airport
- Columbia Army Air Base
- Congree Army Airfield
- Cross City Air Force Station
- Dale Mabry Army Airfield
- Demopolis Army Airfield
- Dyersburg Army Air Base
- Florence Regional Airport
- Graham Air Base
- Greenville Army Air Base
- Hattiesburg Bobby L. Chain Municipal Airport
- Hawkins Field (airport)
- Hesler-Noble Field
- Hunter Army Airfield
- Immokalee Regional Airport
- Jim Hamilton–L.B. Owens Airport
- Lake Charles Army Air Field
- Lake Wales Municipal Airport
- Lakeland Army Air Field
- MacDill Field
- Page Field Army Airfield
- Perry–Foley Airport
- Pinellas Army Air Field
- Punta Gorda Airport (Florida)
- Scholes International Airport at Galveston
- Venice Army Air Field

== Sources ==
- R. Frank Futrell, “The Development of Base Facilities,” in The Army Air Forces in World War II, vol. 6, Men and Planes, ed. Wesley Frank Craven and James Lea Cate, 142 (Washington, D.C., Office of Air Force History, new imprint, 1983).
