= 312th Fighter Squadron =

312th Fighter Squadron

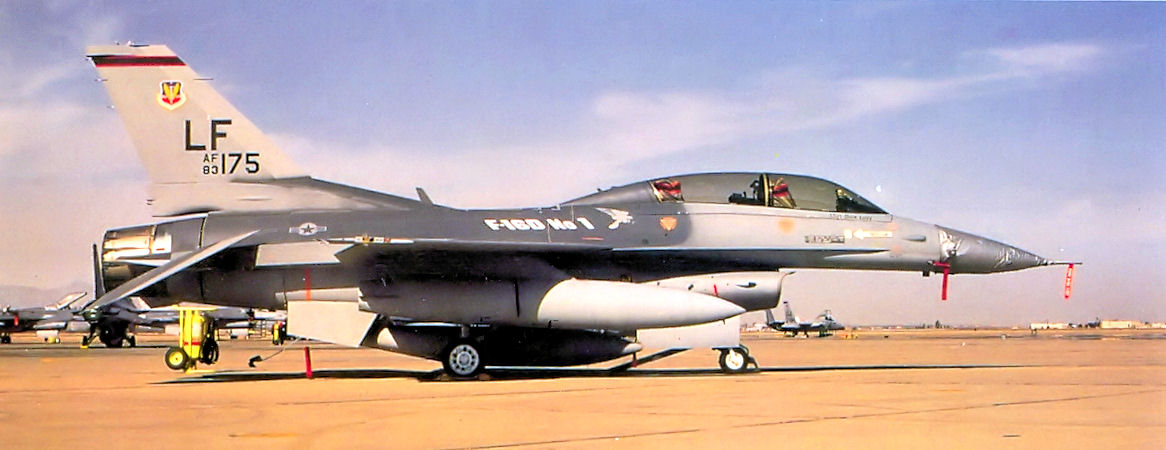
- 312th Tactical Fighter Training Squadron F-16D (Note: Aircraft is General Dynamics F-16D Block 25 Fighting Falcon, serial 83-1175. Although marked as "F-16D No. 1", it was the second Block 25 F-16D. The plane was later transferred to the Arizona Air National Guard. Baugher, Joe (10 June 2023). "1983 USAF Serial Numbers". Joe Baugher.)
- Active: 1942–1944; 1984–1991; 2023–present
- Country: United States
- Branch: United States Air Force
- Role: Fighter
- Part of: Air Combat Command
- Garrison/HQ: Luke Air Force Base, Arizona

Insignia
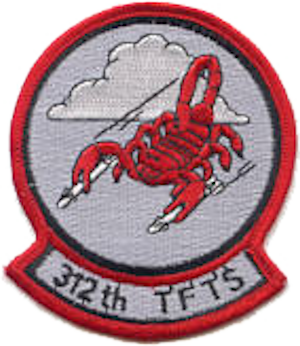
- Patch with 312th Tactical Fighter Training Squadron emblem

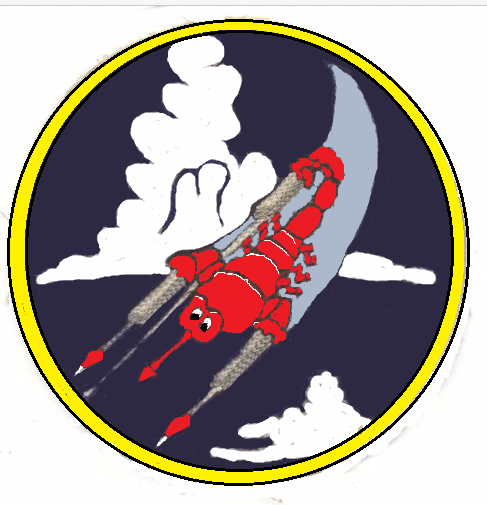
- 312th Fighter Squadron emblem (Note: Approved 17 February 1944. Description: On a medium blue disc, border yellow, edged black, a caricatured red scorpion, holding and firing forward three aerial machine gunsproper while leaving a curved vapor trail light turquoise blue stretching back to sinister chief, all in front of a large white cloud formation, edged black in chief and a smaller white cloud formation in sinister base.)
- 1984–1991 Tail Code: LF

The 312th Fighter Squadron is an active United States Air Force unit, stationed at Luke Air Force Base, Arizona. Its last previous assignment was with the 58th Tactical Training Wing at Luke, where it was inactivated on 18 January 1991. Upon inactivation, the squadron's personnel, equipment and aircraft were transferred to the 311th Fighter Squadron.

The squadron was first activated during World War II and served as a fighter replacement training unit until it was disbanded in 1944 in a reorganization of Army Air Forces training units. It was reconstituted and activated once again in 1984.

== History ==
=== World War II ===
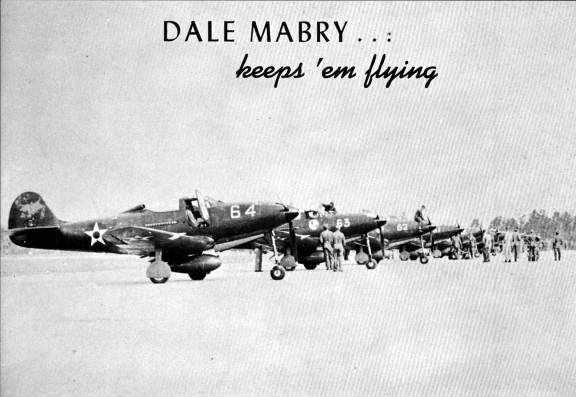
P-39 Airacobras of the 338th Fighter Group at Dale Mabry Field in 1942

The squadron was activated as part of the 338th Fighter Group at Dale Mabry Field, Florida in July 1942. The 312th initially flew the Bell P-39 Airacobra.

The squadron's mission was to act as a Replacement Training Unit (RTU). RTUs were oversized units that trained individual pilots or aircrews following their graduation from flight school. In June 1943, the 338th Group began a split organization and the 312th and 441st Fighter Squadrons moved to Perry Army Air Field, Florida, while group headquarters and the other two squadrons remained at Dale Mabry Field. After September 1943, the group focused on Republic P-47 Thunderbolt training, although the squadron had some P-40s in 1944.

However, the Army Air Forces was finding that standard military units, based on relatively inflexible tables of organization were not proving well adapted to the training mission. Accordingly, it adopted a more functional system for its training bases in which each base was organized into a separate numbered unit. The squadron was disbanded in May 1944, and its personnel, equipment and mission transferred to the 342d AAF Base Unit (Replacement Training Unit, Fighter).

=== Tactical Air Command ===
The 312th was reconstituted, designated the 312th Tactical Fighter Training Squadron and reactivated by Tactical Air Command at Luke Air Force Base, Arizona in October 1984 as the first General Dynamics F-16C Fighting Falcon training squadron in the USAF. The squadron once again acted as a replacement training unit. It was initially equipped with new Block 25 Fighting Falcons, but it converted to new Block 42 planes in 1990. Its aircraft carried "LF" tail code with a black tail stripe outlined in red. It was inactivated in 1991 and most of its aircraft reassigned to 308th, 309th and 310th Fighter Squadrons.

=== Air Combat Command ===
On 1 June 2023, the squadron was activated and redesignated as the 312th Fighter Squadron as an F-35A Lightning II training unit, primarily training F-35 crew for the Belgian Air Component at Luke Air Force Base.

== Lineage ==
- Constituted as the 312th Fighter Squadron on 16 July 1942

Activated on 22 July 1942
Disbanded on 1 May 1944

- Reconstituted and redesignated 312th Tactical Fighter Training Squadron on 1 May 1984

Activated 1 October 1984
Inactivated on 18 January 1991

- Redesignated 312th Fighter Squadron on 2 May 2023

Activated on 1 June 2023

=== Assignments ===
- 338th Fighter Group, 22 July 1942 – 1 May 1944
- 58th Tactical Training Wing, 1 October 1984 – 18 January 1991
- 56th Operations Group, 1 June 2023 – present

=== Stations ===
- Dale Mabry Field, Florida, 22 July 1942
- Perry Army Air Field, Florida, 13 Jun 1943 – 1 May 1944
- Luke Air Force Base, Arizona, 1 October 1984 – 18 January 1991
- Luke Air Force Base, Arizona, 1 June 2023 – present

=== Aircraft ===
- Bell P-39 Airacobra, 1942–1943
- Republic P-47 Thunderbolt, 1943–1944
- Curtiss P-40 Warhawk, 1944
- General Dynamics F-16C/D Fighting Falcon, 1984–1991
- Lockheed Martin F-35A Lightning II, 2023 -

== Bibliography ==
- Craven, Wesley F; Cate, James L, eds. (1955). The Army Air Forces in World War II (PDF). Vol. VI, Men & Planes. Chicago, IL: University of Chicago Press. LCCN 48003657. OCLC 704158. Archived from the original (PDF) on 20 December 2016.
  Goss, William A. (1955). "The Organization and its Responsibilities, Chapter 2 The AAF". In Craven, Wesley F.; Cate, James L. (eds.). The Army Air Forces in World War II (PDF). Vol. VI, Men & Planes. Chicago, IL: University of Chicago Press. LCCN 48003657. OCLC 704158.
- Martin, Patrick (1994). Tail Code: The Complete History of USAF Tactical Aircraft Tail Code Markings. Atglen, PA: Schiffer Military Aviation History. ISBN 0-88740-513-4.
- Maurer, Maurer, ed. (1983) [1961]. Air Force Combat Units of World War II (PDF) (reprint ed.). Washington, DC: Office of Air Force History. ISBN 0-912799-02-1. LCCN 61060979. Archived from the original (PDF) on 20 December 2016.
- Maurer, Maurer, ed. (1982) [1969]. Combat Squadrons of the Air Force, World War II (PDF) (reprint ed.). Washington, DC: Office of Air Force History. ISBN 0-405-12194-6. LCCN 70605402. OCLC 72556. Archived from the original (PDF) on 20 December 2016.
- Rogers, Brian. (2005). United States Air Force Unit Designations Since 1978. Hinkley, UK: Midland Publications. ISBN 1-85780-197-0.
