= 170th Fighter Squadron =

170th Fighter Squadron

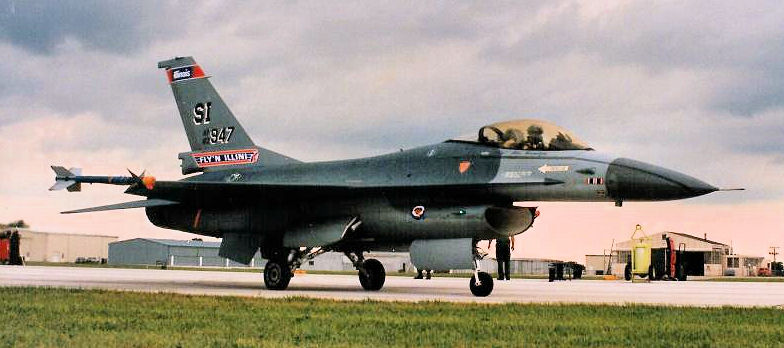
- 170th Tactical Fighter Squadron F-16 Fighting Falcon (Note: Aircraft is General Dynamics F-16A block 15 serial 82-947 at Quincy Regional Airport in 1991. This aircraft was retired to the Aerospace Maintenance and Regeneration Center as FG0269 on 28 October 1994.)
- Active: 1942-1944; 1948-1952; 1953-2008
- Country: United States
- Allegiance: Illinois
- Branch: Air National Guard
- Type: Squadron
- Role: Fighter
- Part of: Illinois Air National Guard
- Garrison/HQ: Capital Airport Air National Guard Station, Springfield, Illinois

Insignia
- 170th Fighter Squadron emblem

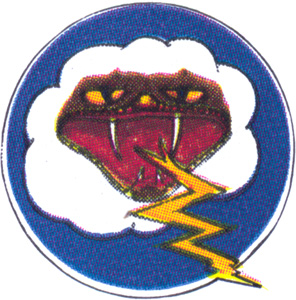
- 305th Fighter Squadron emblem
- Tail markings: Blue tail stripe, "Illinois" in white letters

The 170th Fighter Squadron (170 FS) is an inactive unit of the Air National Guard. It was last assigned to the 183rd Fighter Wing located of the Illinois Air National Guard at Capital Airport Air National Guard Station, Springfield, Illinois. The 170th last flew the Block 30 General Dynamics F-16 Fighting Falcon. It was inactivated on 30 September 2008.

== History ==
=== World War II ===
The squadron was activated at Dale Mabry Field, Florida as one of the original squadrons of the 338th Fighter Group. The squadron was initially equipped with Bell P-39 Airacobras. It operated as a replacement training unit. Replacement training units were oversized units which trained aircrews prior to their deployment to combat theaters. In 1943, the 338th Group and its squadrons standardized training with the Republic P-47 Thunderbolts, although the squadron also operated a few Curtiss P-40 Warhawks.

However, the Army Air Forces found that standard military units, based on relatively inflexible tables of organization, were proving poorly adapted to the training mission. Accordingly, it adopted a more functional system in which each base was organized into a separate numbered unit, while the groups and squadrons acting as RTUs were disbanded or inactivated. This resulted in the 305th, along with other units at Dale Mabry, being disbanded in the spring of 1944 and its personnel and aircraft were transferred to the 335th Army Air Force Base Unit (Replacement Training Unit Fighter).

=== Illinois Air National Guard ===
The 305th Fighter Squadron was reconstituted and redesignated as the 170th Fighter Squadron on 24 May 1946 and allotted to the National Guard. In September 1948 the squadron was organized at Capital Airport, Springfield, Illinois and extended federal recognition. The squadron was equipped with the North American F-51D Mustang and was assigned to the 128th Fighter Group of the Wisconsin Air National Guard. In November 1950, the 126th Composite Wing was organized in the Illinois Air National Guard when the National Guard adopted the wing base organization system and the squadron was assigned to its 126th Composite Group.

==== Korean War mobilization ====
On 1 March 1951 the 170th was called to active duty due to the Korean War. It moved to Bergstrom Air Force Base, Texas where it was redesignated the 170th Fighter-bomber Squadron and was assigned to the federalized 131st Fighter-Bomber Group. In addition to the 170th, the 131st Group was assigned the 110th Fighter-Bomber Squadron of the Missouri Air National Guard and the 192d Fighter-Bomber Squadron of the Nevada Air National Guard. At Bergstrom, its mission was to replace the 27th Fighter-Escort Group which deployed to Japan as part of Strategic Air Command's commitment to the Korean War.

In November the 131st and its squadrons were transferred to Tactical Air Command and moved to George Air Force Base, California. At George, the unit was scheduled to be re-equipped with Republic F-84D Thunderjets for deployment to Japan, however the F-84s were instead sent to France and the squadron remained in California with Mustangs for the remainder of its federal service. The 170th was released from active duty and returned to Illinois state control on 1 December 1952 and its personnel, equipment and mission at George were transferred to the active duty 435th Fighter-Bomber Squadron.

==== Cold War ====
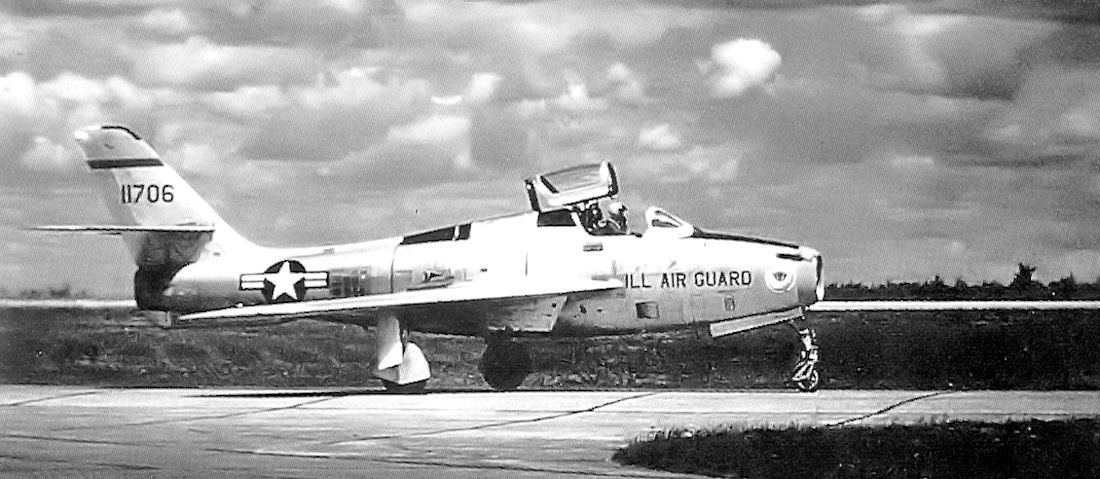
Unpainted 170th Fighter-Bomber Squadron F-84F (Note: Aircraft is Republic F-84F-25-RE Thunderstreak serial 51-1706, taken about 1959.)

After returning to Springfield, the 170th was equipped with the North American F-86E Sabre. However, only about a half-dozen Sabres were received before the squadron began receiving Republic F-84F Thunderstreaks. The first F-84F arrived in February 1955. The squadron's mission was changed to what was termed a "Special Delivery" squadron, and the 170th began training on the tactical delivery of nuclear weapons, being renamed the 170th Tactical Fighter Squadron in 1958.

On 1 October 1961, as a result of the 1961 Berlin Crisis, the 170th was again federalized and assigned to the 131st Tactical Fighter Group. The 170th remained at Springfield, while elements of the 131st deployed to Toul-Rosières Air Base, France to form the 7131st Tactical Fighter Wing. The 131st Tactical Fighter Wing, was composed of three federalized National Guard squadrons and their supporting squadrons. However, only its 110th Tactical Fighter Squadron deployed as a unit to France. The 170th rotated personnel to Toul during their period of activation, however aircraft and personnel deployed to Toul were maintained at a level equivalent to a single squadron at any one time.

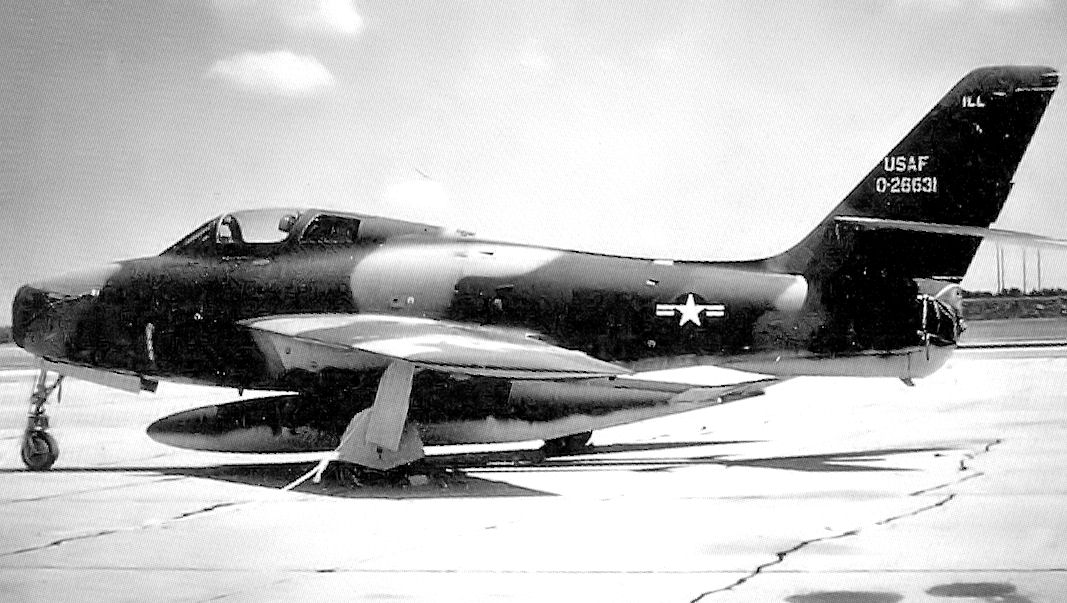
Camouflaged squadron F-84F (Note: Aircraft is Republic F-84F-40-RE Thunderstreak serial 52-6631 in Vietnam War camouflage.)

While in France, the Guardsmen trained with elements of the United States Seventh Army and maintained a 24-hour alert status. The 7131st exchanged air and ground crews with the Royal Danish Air Force's 730th Tactical Fighter Squadron at Skydstrup Air Station, Denmark during May 1962. As the Berlin situation subsided, all activated ANG units were ordered to be returned to the United States and released from active duty, while the 7131st Wing was discontinued in France.

The 170th reformed in Illinois in the fall of 1962, retaining its F-84F Thunderstreaks. On 15 October 1962, the 170th Tactical Fighter Squadron was authorized to expand, and the 183d Tactical Fighter Group was established. The 170th became the new group's flying squadron. Other units assigned into the group were the 183rd Material Squadron, 183rd Combat Support Squadron and the 183rd Tactical Dispensary.

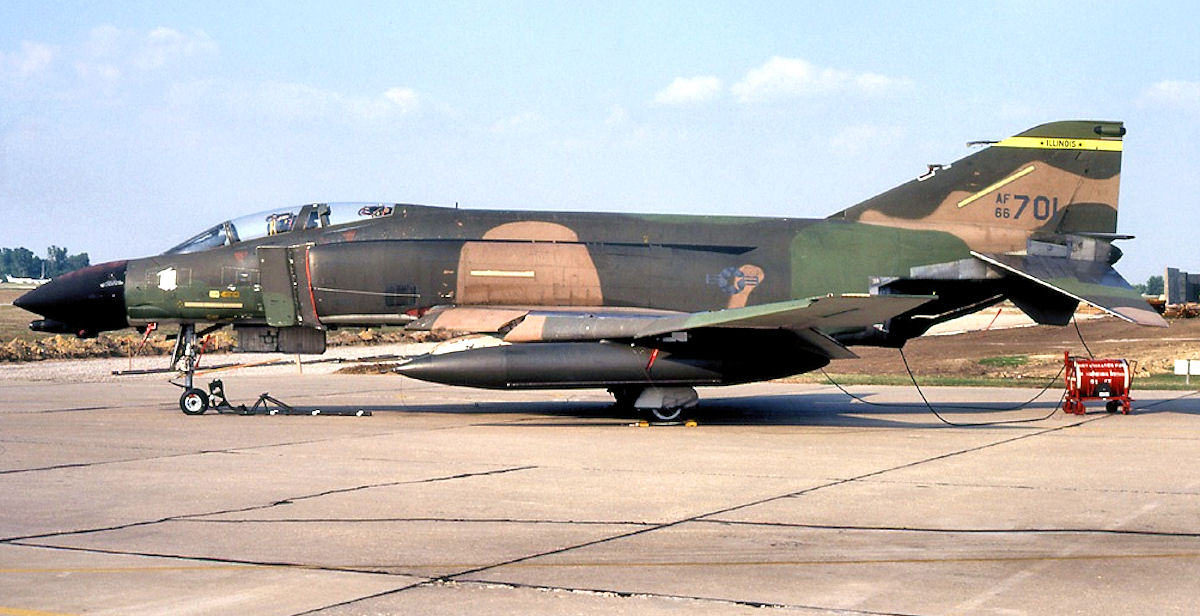
170th Tactical Fighter Squadron F-4D (Note: Aircraft is McDonnell F-4D-31-MC Phantom II serial 66-7701, about 1982. The aircraft was retired to the Aerospace Maintenance and Regeneration Center as FP0146 on 2 August 1988.)

The squadron continued to fly the F-84F aircraft throughout the 1960s. The squadron did not see service during the Vietnam War, although, between 1968 and 1971, many of its personnel were activated as individuals and some saw service in Southeast Asia. All F-84Fs were grounded in November 1971, after a 170th pilot was killed when his plane lost a wing during exercises at the Hardwood Gunnery range in Findley, Wisconsin. The accident was caused by the "milkbone" bolt in the wing, weakened by years of flying, failing in-flight. Inspections of other F-84Fs found the same issue affected many other aircraft. The problem was deemed too widespread to justify the costly repair of the aircraft, and the Air Force decided to retire the Guard's fleet of F-84Fs and replace them with more modern aircraft. All F-84s were retired to the Aerospace Maintenance and Regeneration Center (AMARC) at Davis-Monthan Air Force Base. The 170th flew the Thunderstreak for more than a decade and a half, longer than any other squadron in the active force or the Air National Guard.

In 1972, the squadron was the first Air National Guard unit to receive the McDonnell F-4C Phantom II. Most of its aircraft were planes returning combat from Southeast Asia. Along with the F-4C, a flight of RF-4C Phantom II Reconnaissance aircraft were received. In 1981, the F-4Cs were exchanged for the F-4D.

==== Post Cold War era ====
The 170th saw its first General Dynamics F-16A Fighting Falcon on 7 June 1989 when two landed at Capital Airport to replace the squadron's aging F-4D Phantom IIs. By 5 May 1990 the 170th was operational with the F-16A/B. Its mission was fighter attack and the squadron flew the "Block 15" for this mission. On 15 March 1992 the squadron changed designation from the 170th Tactical Fighter Squadron to the 170th Fighter Squadron. Three years later, it would be reassigned to the 183rd Operations Group when its parent became the 183rd Fighter Wing under the Air Force Objective Wing reorganization plan.

During early 1994 the 170th started to exchange its block 15 F-16A/B for block 30 F-16C/D Fighting Falcons with larger air inlets. Most of the block 15s were retired to AMARC. During the 1990s, the unit conducted numerous overseas deployments, including six to Southwest Asia, two to Denmark, one to Panama, one to Curaçao, and one to Thailand.

==== Global War on Terrorism ====
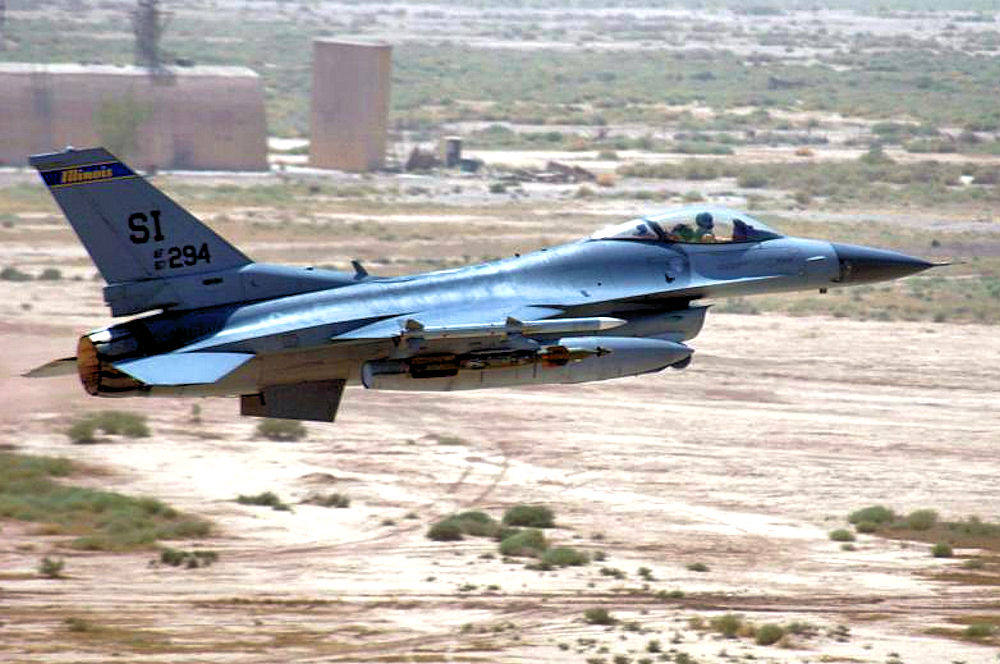
170th Expeditionary Fighter Squadron F-16 (Note: Aircraft is General Dynamics F-16C Fighting Falcon serial 87-294 at Balad Air Base, Iraq, taking off on an Operation Iraqi Freedom mission on 21 July 2006.)

After the 9/11 attacks, the 170th increased its capability by obtaining AN/AAQ-28(V) LITENING targeting pods in October 2001. Training with the new pod started immediately to get ready for a scheduled deployment in March 2002 for Operation Enduring Freedom.

Starting in January 2002 the 170th deployed for two weeks to Tucson Air National Guard Base, Arizona for final training with the LITENING pod. The March 2002 deployment was to be with two other units but this changed due to their Operation Noble Eagle air defense commitments. As a result, the 170th deployed by itself as the 170th Expeditionary Fighter Squadron. The 170th Expeditionary Squadron replaced the 18th Squadron. Besides its duties over Afghanistan, the 170th Expeditionary Squadron performed air interdiction missions over Iraq in support of Operation Southern Watch.

In the very early morning on 17 April 2002 while on deployment in Afghanistan a pilot in a two-ship formation from the 170th mistakenly bombed a Canadian force which was practicing live firing of its weapons near Kandahar, Afghanistan. Four soldiers were killed and eight were injured. This tragedy resulted in non-judicial punishment for one of the pilots involved after their return to Springfield.

After more than two of overseas deployments the 170th participated in Operation Iraqi Freedom in October 2004.

==== BRAC 2005 and Inactivation ====
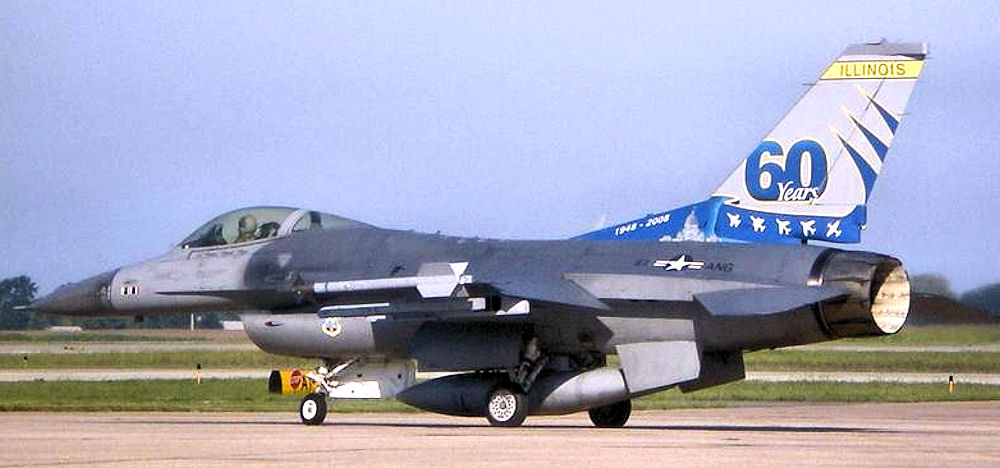
170th Fighter Squadron 60th Anniversary F-16 (Note: Aircraft is General Dynamics F-16C block 30 Fighting Falcon serial 87-296 leaving Capital Airport for its final training flight in September 2008.)

The BRAC 2005 committee report recommended the retirement of the Block 30 F-16s and the inactivation of the 170th Fighter Squadron. The BRAC commission recommended the facilities and skills of personnel assigned be realigned into a Centralized Intermediate Repair Facility. Despite a court challenge by the Governor of Illinois, the US District Judge ruled that there was not enough evidence to support the claim that the state would suffer major harm by the closure of the unit. The last F-16 departed on 23 September 2008, marking the end of the flying mission for the 183rd Fighter Wing.

== Lineage ==
- Constituted as the 305th Fighter Squadron (Single Engine) on 15 July 1942

Activated on 22 July 1942
Disbanded on 1 May 1944

- Reconstituted, redesignated 170th Fighter Squadron, Single Engine and allotted to the National Guard on 24 May 1946

Activated and extended federal recognition on 30 September 1948
Ordered to active service on 1 April 1951

- Redesignated 170th Fighter-Bomber Squadron on 9 April 1951

Inactivated and returned to Illinois state control on 1 January 1953
Activated on 1 January 1953
Redesignated 170th Fighter-Interceptor Squadron on 1 July 1953
Redesignated 170th Tactical Fighter Squadron (Special Delivery) on 10 November 1958
Federalized and placed on active duty on 1 October 1961
Released from active duty and returned to Illinois state control, 31 August 1962
Redesignated 170th Tactical Fighter Squadron on 15 October 1962
Redesignated 170th Fighter Squadron on 15 March 1992
Inactivated on 30 September 2008

=== Assignments ===
- 338th Fighter Group, 22 July 1942 – 4 May 1944
- 128th Fighter Group, 30 September 1948
- 126th Composite Group, 1 November 1950
- 131st Fighter-Bomber Group, 1 April 1951 – 1 December 1952
- 126th Fighter-Bomber Group (later 126th Fighter-Interceptor Group), 1 January 1953
- 131st Tactical Fighter Group, 1 November 1958
- 131st Tactical Fighter Wing, 1 October 1961
- 131st Tactical Fighter Group, 31 August 1962
- 183rd Tactical Fighter Group (later 183rd Fighter Group), 15 October 1962
- 183rd Operations Group, 11 October 1995 – 30 September 2008

=== Stations ===
- Dale Mabry Field, Florida, 22 July 1942
- Sarasota Army Air Field, Florida, 25 September 1942
- Cross City Army Air Field, Florida, 21 October 1942
- Dale Mabry Field, Florida, 13 June 1943 – 1 May 1944
- Springfield, Illinois, 30 September 1948
- Capital Airport, Illinois, 1948
- Bergstrom Air Force Base, Texas, 1 April 1951
- George Air Force Base, California, 7 August 1951 – 1 January 1953
- Capital Airport (later Abraham Lincoln Capital Airport), Illinois, 1 January 1953 – 30 September 2008
- 170th Expeditionary Fighter Squadron deployments:

Operated from: Ahmad al-Jaber Air Base, Kuwait, March–May 1996 Operation Southern Watch
Operated from: Prince Sultan Air Base, Saudi Arabia, June–August 1997 Operation Southern Watch
Operated from: Ahmad al-Jaber Air Base, Kuwait, March–June 2002 Operation Southern Watch/Operation Enduring Freedom
Operated from: Al Udeid Air Base, Qatar, October–December 2004; May–August 2006 Operation Iraqi Freedom

=== Aircraft ===
- Bell P-39 Airacobra, 1942–1943
- Republic P-47 Thunderbolt, 1943–1944
- Curtiss P-40 Warhawk, 1944
- North American F-51D Mustang, 1948–1953
- North American F-86E Sabre, 1953–1955
- Republic F-84F Thunderstreak, 1955–1971
- McDonnell F-4C Phantom II, 1972–1981
- McDonnell RF-4C Phantom II, 1973–1975
- McDonnell F-4D Phantom II, 1981–1989
- Block 15 General Dynamics F-16A Fighting Falcon, 1989–1994
- Block 15 General Dynamics F-16B Fighting Falcon, 1989–1994
- Block 30 General Dynamics F-16C Fighting Falcon, 1994–2008
- Block 30 General Dynamics F-16D Fighting Falcon, 1994–2008
