= 338th Bombardment Group =

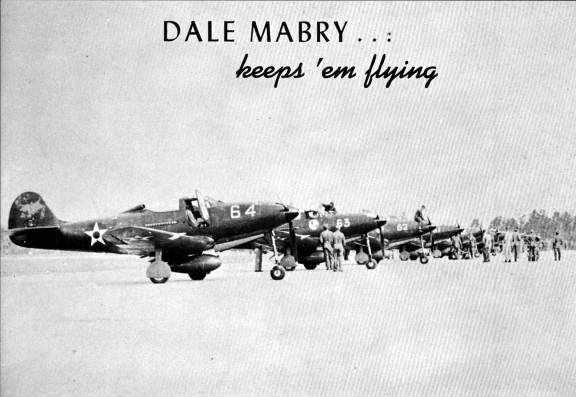
- P-39 Airacobras of the 338th Fighter Group at Dale Mabry Field in 1942
- Active: 1942–1944; 1947–1949
- Country: United States
- Branch: United States Air Force
- Role: Bombardment
- Motto: Ad Metam (Latin for 'To The Goal')

Insignia
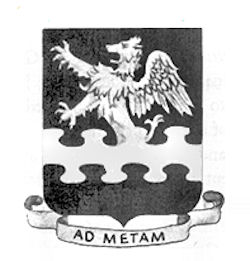
- 338th Bombardment Group emblem (Note: Approved 14 November 1942. Description: Azure, issuing from a fess nebuly debased, a winged lion rampant or.)

The 338th Bombardment Group is a disbanded United States Air Force unit. It was last active with Continental Air Command at O'Hare International Airport, Illinois on 27 June 1949. It was first activated during World War II as the 338th Fighter Group and served primarily as a Replacement Training Unit until it was disbanded in 1944. The group was reconstituted in the reserves in 1947, but was inactivated when military spending was reduced in 1949.

== History ==
=== World War II ===
The group was activated as part of III Fighter Command at Dale Mabry Field, Florida in July 1942. The 305th, 306th, and 312th Fighter Squadrons were assigned as its operational elements. The group initially flew a mix of Bell P-39 Airacobras, Curtiss P-40 Warhawks, Republic P-47 Thunderbolts and North American P-51 Mustangs.

The group's mission was to act as a Replacement Training Unit (RTU). RTUs were oversized units that trained individual pilots or aircrews following their graduation from flight school. In February 1943, the group added a fourth squadron, the 441st Fighter Squadron. After this squadron was operational, the group began a split operation, with group headquarters and the 305th and 306th Squadrons remaining at Dale Mabry Field, while the 312th and 441st Squadrons operated from Perry Army Air Field, Florida. After September 1943, the group focused on P-47 training, although it also had some P-40s again in 1944.

However, the Army Air Forces was finding that standard military units, based on relatively inflexible tables of organization were not proving well adapted to the training mission. Accordingly it adopted a more functional system for its training bases in which each base was organized into a separate numbered unit. The group and its squadrons were disbanded in May 1944, and its personnel, equipment and mission at Dale Mabry Field transferred to 335th Army Air Force Base Unit (Replacement Training Unit, Fighter), while units at Perry were blended into the 342d AAF Base Unit (Replacement Training Unit, Fighter).

=== Air reserves ===
The group was reconstituted in 1947 and activated in the reserves at Orchard Place Airport, Illinois on 12 June. It was assigned the 561st 562d and 563d Bombardment Squadrons. The 560th Bombardment Squadron, which was already active at Orchard Park, however, was not assigned to the group until the end of September. In October, the 42d Fighter Squadron was activated and assigned to the group. The group trained under the supervision of Air Defense Command (ADC)'s 141st AAF Base Unit (Reserve Training) (later the 2471st Air Force Reserve Flying Training Center). As the post war Air Force took shape, the National Guard was considered the first line of reserve. Reserve units got what was left over after National Guard units received facilities, equipment and aircraft. Aircraft were allotted to reserve units as a means of maintaining flying proficiency, not combat readiness. Aircraft assigned to the reserves were overwhelmingly trainers.

In July 1948 Continental Air Command (ConAC) assumed responsibility for managing reserve and Air National Guard units from ADC. In September 1948, the group's 561st Squadron moved to General Mitchell Field, Wisconsin, although it remained assigned to the group. The 338th was inactivated when ConAC reorganized its reserve units under the wing base organization system in June 1949. President Truman’s reduced 1949 defense budget also required reductions in the number of units in the Air Force, The Air Force reorganized its operational reserve forces into 25 wings located at 23 reserve training centers, a reduction of 18 training centers. At O'Hare, the 338th Group and its squadrons were inactivated, and most of its personnel transferred to the 437th Troop Carrier Wing. The 561st Squadron in Wisconsin was also inactivated, but its inactivation temporarily ended reserve flying operations there.

== Lineage ==
- Constituted as the 338th Fighter Group on 16 July 1942
- Activated on 22 July 1942
- Disbanded on 4 May 1944
- Reconstituted and redesignated 338th Bombardment Group, Very Heavy, on 5 May 1947
- Activated on 12 June 1947
- Inactivated on 27 June 1949
- Disbanded 9 September 1992

=== Assignments ===
- III Fighter Command, 22 July 1942 – 4 May 1944
- 73d Bombardment Wing (later 73d Air Division), 12 June 1947 – 27 June 1949

=== Components ===
- 42d Fighter Squadron: 15 October 1947 – 27 June 1949
- 305th Fighter Squadron: 16 July 1942 – 1 May 1944
- 306th Fighter Squadron: 16 July 1942 – 1 May 1944
- 312th Fighter Squadron: 16 July 1942 – 1 May 1944
- 441st Fighter Squadron: 21 February 1943 – 1 May 1944
- 560th Bombardment Squadron: 30 September 1947 – 27 June 1949
- 561st Bombardment Squadron: 12 June 1947 – 27 June 1949
- 562d Bombardment Squadron: 12 June 1947 – 27 June 1949
- 563d Bombardment Squadron: 12 June 1947 – 27 June 1949

=== Stations ===
- Dale Mabry Field, Florida, 22 July 1942 – 1 May 1944
- Orchard Place Airport (later O'Hare International Airport), Illinois, 12 June 1947 – 27 June 1949

=== Aircraft ===
- Bell P-39 Airacobra, 1942–1944
- Curtiss P-40 Warhawk, 1942–1943, 1944
- Republic P-47 Thunderbolt, 1942–1944
- North American P-51 Mustang, 1942–1943

=== Campaigns ===
Service Streamer	Campaign	Dates	Notes
	American Theater without inscription	22 July 1942 – 1 May 1944	338th Fighter Group

== See also ==
- List of United States Air Force Groups
