= KPGD =

KPGD may refer to:

- ICAO code for Punta Gorda Airport (Florida) (formerly Charlotte County Airport) in Punta Gorda, Florida, United States
- KPGD-LP, a defunct low-power television station (channel 53) formerly licensed to Plainview, Texas, United States
