= Capital Airport Air National Guard Station =

Coordinates: 39.847°N 89.668°W

Capital Airport Air National Guard Station is a 91-acre (370,000 m^{2}) facility on land leased from the Springfield Airport Authority (SAA), located on the grounds of Abraham Lincoln Capital Airport.

== Overview ==
It is home to the 183d Fighter Wing (183 FW), an Illinois Air National Guard unit operationally gained by the Air Combat Command (ACC) and State Headquarters, Illinois Air National Guard. Historically a fighter unit, the 183 FW consists of 321 full-time and 800 part-time military personnel (total strength 1,321).

The 183 FW was directed to divest itself of its fighter aircraft pursuant to a Base Realignment and Closure (BRAC) 2005 decision and in October 2008, the last of the 170th Fighter Squadron's fifteen F-16C/D Fighting Falcon aircraft departed Capital Airport AGS for redistribution to other Air National Guard fighter wings.

The 183 FW remains in place at Capital Airport AGS minus a flying mission while the U.S. Air Force, the Air Combat Command and the Air National Guard determine a new role and mission set for the wing. The Illinois Air National Guard State Headquarters, Expeditionary Combat Support (ECS) elements of the 183 FW, the 217th Engineering Installation Squadron, and the F110 engine Centralized Intermediate Repair Facility (CIRF) also remain in place at Capital Airport AGS.
