= 441st Fighter Squadron =

441st Fighter Squadron (later 41st Tactical Missile Squadron)
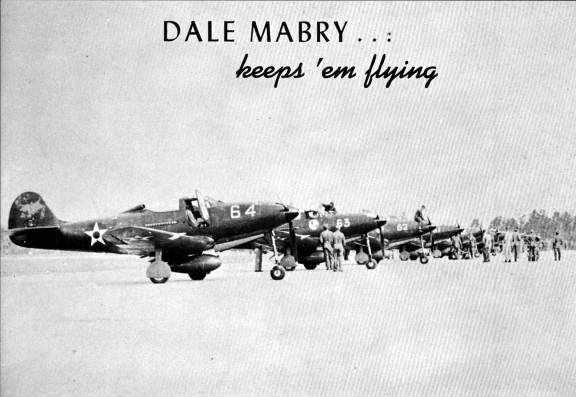
- P-39 Airacobras of the 338th Fighter Group at Dale Mabry Field in 1942
- Active: 1943–1944; 1952–1954
- Country: United States
- Branch: United States Air Force
- Role: Missile operations

Insignia
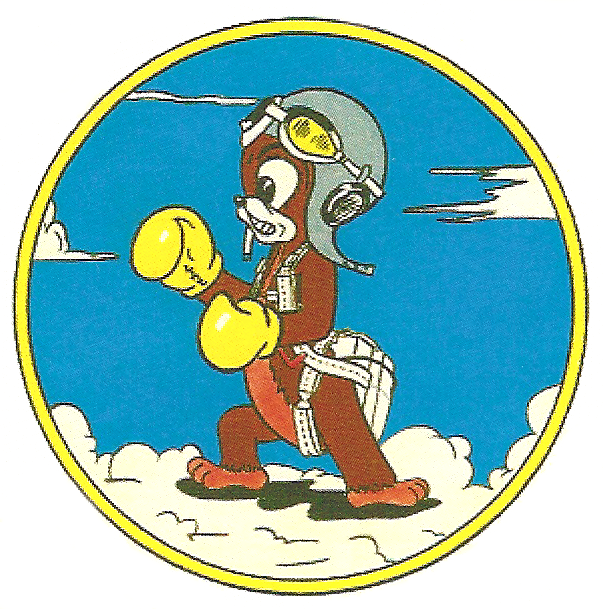
- 441st Fighter Squadron emblem (approved 17 February 1944)

The 441st Tactical Missile Squadron is an inactive United States Air Force unit. It was formed by the consolidation of the 941st Forward Air Control Squadron, which was attached to the 507th Tactical Control Group at Pope Air Force Base, North Carolina until 12 January 1954 and the 441st Fighter Squadron, a Replacement Training Unit that operated in Florida during World War II, until it was disbanded in a reorganization of Army Air Forces training units in 1944.

== History ==
The squadron was activated as part of the 338th Fighter Group at Dale Mabry Field, Florida in February 1943, when the 338th Group expanded from three to four squadrons. The 441st flew the Republic P-47 Thunderbolt.

The squadron's mission was to act as a Replacement Training Unit (RTU). RTUs were oversized units that trained individual pilots or aircrews following their graduation from flight school. In June 1943, the 338th Group began a split organization and the 441st and 312th Fighter Squadrons moved to Perry Army Air Field, Florida, while group headquarters and the other two squadrons remained at Dale Mabry Field. The squadron focused on Republic P-47 Thunderbolt training, although the squadron had some Curtiss P-40 Warhawks in 1944.

However, the Army Air Forces was finding that standard military units based on relatively inflexible tables of organization were not proving well adapted to the training mission. Accordingly it adopted a more functional system for its training bases in which each base was organized into a separate numbered unit. The squadron was disbanded in May 1944, and its personnel, equipment and mission transferred to the 342d AAF Base Unit (Replacement Training Unit, Fighter).

The 941st Forward Air Control Squadron was activated in November 1952 at Pope Air Force Base, North Carolina, it is not clear if the unit was fully manned or equipped before it was inactivated in January 1954. In September 1945, the two squadrons were consolidated as the 41st Tactical Missile Squadron, but have not been active under that designation.

=== Lineage ===
441st Fighter Squadron

- Constituted as the 441st Fighter Squadron on 12 February 1943

Activated on 21 February 1943
Disbanded on 1 May 1944
Reconstituted and consolidated with the 941st Forward Air Control Squadron as the 41st Tactical Missile Squadron on 19 September 1985

41st Tactical Missile Squadron

- Constituted as the 941st Forward Air Control Squadron on 23 September 1952

Activated 20 November 1952
Inactivated on 12 January 1954
Consolidated with the 441st Fighter Squadron as the 41st Tactical Missile Squadron on 19 September 1985

=== Assignments ===
- 338th Fighter Group, 21 February 1943 – 1 May 1944
- Ninth Air Force, 20 November 1952 – 12 January 1954 (attached to 507 Tactical Control Group)

=== Stations ===
- Dale Mabry Field, Florida, 21 February 1943
- Perry Army Air Field, Florida, 9 June 1943 – 1 May 1944
- Pope Air Force Base, North Carolina, 20 November 1952 – 12 January 1954

=== Aircraft ===
- Republic P-47 Thunderbolt, 1943–1944
- Curtiss P-40 Warhawk, 1944

=== Campaigns ===
Service Streamer	Campaign	Dates	Notes
	American Theater without inscription	21 February 1943 – 1 May 1944	441st Fighter Squadron

== See also ==
- List of United States Air Force missile squadrons
