= Abraham Lincoln Capital Airport =

Airport serving Springfield, Illinois, USA

- IATA: SPI; ICAO: KSPI; FAA LID: SPI; WMO: 72439

Summary
- Airport type: Public
- Owner/Operator: Springfield Airport Authority
- Serves: Springfield, Illinois
- Opened: November 1947; 79 years ago
- Occupants: 183rd Wing
- Time zone: UTC−06:00 (-6)
  - Summer (DST): UTC−05:00 (-5)
- Elevation AMSL: 598 ft (182 m)
- Coordinates: 39°50′39″N 089°40′41″W
- Website: www.FlySPI.com

Maps
- FAA airport diagram
- Interactive map of Abraham Lincoln Capital Airport

Runways
| Direction | Length | | Surface |
| Direction | ft | m | Surface |
|---|---|---|---|
| 4/22 | 8,001 | 2,439 | Concrete |
| 13/31 | 7,400 | 2,256 | Asphalt |

Statistics
- Aircraft operations (2022): 25,915
- Based aircraft (2022): 93
- Passenger volume (12 months ending March 2020): 145,000
- Scheduled flights: 1,761
- Source: Federal Aviation Administration, BTS

Abraham Lincoln Capital Airport (IATA: SPI, ICAO: KSPI, FAA LID: SPI) – also known as Springfield Airport – is a civil-military airport in Springfield, Sangamon County, Illinois, United States, located approximately 3 miles (4.8 km) northwest of downtown Springfield. It is owned by the Springfield Airport Authority (SAA).

The Federal Aviation Administration (FAA) National Plan of Integrated Airport Systems for 2023–2027 categorized it as a non-hub primary commercial service facility.

It is the seventh busiest airport of the 12 commercial airports in Illinois.

== History ==
The airport was dedicated in November 1947 under the name "Capital Airport." It came after pressure to construct a modern facility, as American Airlines and Chicago & Southern Airlines had canceled flights to Springfield in 1938 and 1939 respectively due to inadequate facilities at Capital Airport's predecessor. Construction on the new airport was begun soon after those cancellations but was delayed due to World War II.

The original airport had three 5300-foot runways, a service apron, a temporary passenger terminal, and T-hangars for 38 aircraft.

Two units of the Illinois National Guard were stationed at the airport in 1946, and one of them remains at the airport today.

In 2018, the airport embarked on an upgrade of its passenger terminal after receiving nearly $7 million from the Airport Improvement Program, a grant sponsored by the Federal Aviation Administration. The airport also worked to improve general aviation facilities like the FBO and hangars; roadways; and parking lots.

The coronavirus pandemic brought about airline suspensions at the airport, marking a significant downturn of traffic through the airport. Airlines returned service as travel picked up and after receiving money from the federal CARES Act to prop up flights.

The Illinois Department of Transportation named SPI the top primary airport in the state in 2020. The department considered things such as how well the airport worked with the state's Division of Aeronautics, the airport's safety record, promotion of aviation and educational events and general maintenance.

In 2021, the airport received $3 million in funding from the State of Illinois to upgrade facilities during the travel downturn caused by the Covid-19 pandemic. The funds went towards rehabilitating the north airport public parking lot and the north airport roadway. The airport also began constructing a new crosswind runway in 2021 to accommodate more traffic in a wider variety of wind conditions. In 2022, runway 18-36 was removed.

The airport is taking significant steps to prepare their facilities to accommodate electric-powered aircraft. The airport broke ground on a solar energy farm in 2022 to increase the role of renewable energy in powering the airport, with the goal of powering over 90% of the airport's needs with renewables.

== Military use ==
The airport is home to Capital Airport Air National Guard Station, a 91-acre (370,000 m^{2}) facility on land leased from the Springfield Airport Authority (SAA). It is home to the 183d Fighter Wing (183 FW), an Illinois Air National Guard unit operationally gained by the Air Combat Command (ACC) and State Headquarters, Illinois Air National Guard. Historically a fighter unit, the 183 FW consists of 321 full-time and 800 part-time military personnel (total strength 1,321).

== Facilities and aircraft ==
The airport covers 2,300 acres (930 ha) at an elevation of 598 feet (182 m). It has two runways: 4/22 is 8,001 by 150 feet (2,439 x 46 m) concrete; and 13/31 is 7,400 by 150 feet (2,256 x 46 m) asphalt.

In the year ending July 31, 2022, the airport had 25,915 aircraft operations, average 71 per day: 64% general aviation, 20% military, 15% air taxi, and 2% commercial. For the same time period, 93 aircraft were based at the airport: 69 single-engine and 6 multi-engine airplanes, 12 jets, 4 helicopters, 1 glider, and 1 ultralight.

The airport has an FBO offering fuel, general maintenance, catering, hangars, courtesy cars, conference rooms, a crew lounge, snooze rooms, and more.

=== Terminal services ===
The airport terminal has a Subway, a gift shop, an ATM, TV, and a lounge.

=== Ground transportation ===
Sangamon Mass Transit District, the operator of public transit in Springfield, does not serve the airport as of 2023.

== Airlines and destinations ==
| Airlines | Destinations |
|---|---|
| Allegiant Air | Punta Gorda (FL) |
| American Eagle | Chicago–O'Hare |
| Breeze Airways | Orlando |

Allegiant Air and Breeze Airways use mainline jets to service the airport; American Eagle flights from Springfield use regional jets.

The airport was previously served by Ozark Airlines McDonnell Douglas DC-9-10s, DC-9-30s and Fairchild Hiller FH-227s to St. Louis and Chicago O'Hare Airport. Air Illinois flew BAC One-Elevens (to St. Louis and Chicago) and also served the airport with Hawker Siddeley HS 748s, Handley Page Jetstreams and de Havilland Canada DHC-6 Twin Otters. Air Illinois HS 748s flew nonstop among other routes to the now-closed Meigs Field on the lakefront next to downtown Chicago.

== Statistics ==
=== Top destinations ===
Busiest domestic routes from SPI (March 2025 – February 2026)
| Rank | City | Passengers | Carriers |
|---|---|---|---|
| 1 | Chicago–O'Hare, Illinois | 20,170 | American |
| 2 | Punta Gorda, Florida | 16,940 | Allegiant |
| 3 | Orlando, Florida | 9,360 | Breeze |

=== Carrier shares ===
Carrier shares (March 2025 – February 2026)
| Rank | Carrier | Passengers | % of market |
|---|---|---|---|
| 1 | Allegiant | 34,140 | 36.44% |
| 2 | Envoy | 32,310 | 34.49% |
| 3 | Breeze | 18,670 | 19.93% |
| 4 | SkyWest | 5,250 | 5.60% |
| 5 | Air Wisconsin | 3,320 | 3.54% |

== Accidents and incidents ==
- On December 20, 2007, a Beechcraft Bonanza crashed in Springfield while en route to SPI. The pilot reported a problem while flying the Instrument Landing System approach and deviated from the approach, flying around until crashing. The probable cause was found to be loss of control during an instrument approach due to spatial disorientation.
- On January 6, 2011, a Learjet 35A crashed while landing at SPI. The crew reported the aircraft's master warning and stick shaker activated when the aircraft was on short final while flying an instrument approach procedure. The aircraft impacted left of the runway centerline before departing the right side of the runway. The two pilots received minor injuries, and the passengers were uninjured. The probable cause of the accident was found to be the pilot's decision to conduct an instrument approach in icing conditions without the anti-ice system activated, resulting in an inadvertent aerodynamic stall due to in-flight accumulation of airframe icing.
- On January 27, 2020, a twin-engine Piper Aerostar aircraft crashed outside SPI while approaching the airport en route from Huntsville, Alabama. Officials reported at the time that the aircraft was having trouble with its instruments. Former Springfield mayor Frank Edwards and then-current Sangamon County Coroner Cinda Edwards were among those killed in the crash.

== See also ==
- List of airports in Illinois
- Springfield station
- Springfield-Sangamon Transportation Center
