= Venice Army Air Field =

Inactive military air field near Venice, Florida, U.S.

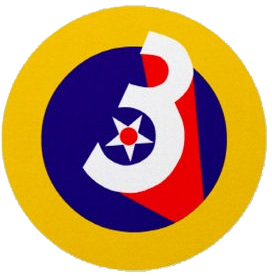
Venice Army Airfield
- Part of Third Air Force
- Venice, Florida in United States
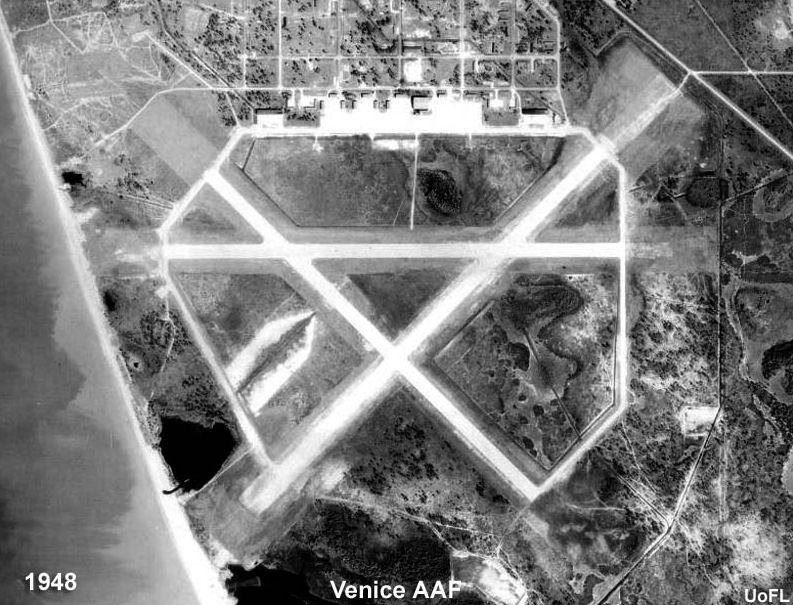
- Aerial of Venice Army Airfield in 1948

Location
- Location within Florida
- Coordinates: 27°04′18″N 82°26′25″W

Site history
- Built: 1942
- Built by: United States Army
- In use: 1942–1945
- Events: World War II

Venice Army Airfield is an inactive United States Army Forces base, approximately 2 miles (3.2 km) south-southeast of Venice, Florida. It was active during World War II as a Third Air Force training airfield. It was closed on November 30, 1945.

== History ==
The story of Venice Army Air Field begins in 1941 when influential citizens in Venice, Florida sent a telegram to the War Department offering 3,000 acres of land near the town of 500 citizens for use as an Army campsite. The War Department responded by sending a military detail to Venice to survey the site. The survey was successful and it was announced on July 16, 1941, that the site was selected for an "Anti-Aircraft Artillery Installation". Further surveys were made by the United States Army that summer, but then nothing happened. For reasons never made clear, the land would never be used by anti-aircraft artillery.

In early 1942, the Army Air Forces became interested in the site and developing a training center on it. The plan was to establish a small training facility to accommodate about 1,000 men with a possibility of expanding it later. Its mission would not be for forces directly engaged in combat, but for the Air Service Command whose members would work in the rear echelon and would relieve combat squadrons of maintenance and housekeeping details at air bases behind the lines.

The trained unit would be designated a "Service Group" and would serve several combat units flying from different forward airstrips. The Service Group would be equipped with the necessary resources to fully support the combat units by providing station security, mess halls, aircraft parts supply, base administration, aircraft mechanics, communications, medical, finance, and all the other necessary support services needed, and also be mobile enough to follow the combat units.

With these requirements, Army Air Force construction personnel began arriving in Venice during May 1942 and within a short time, the first load of trucks loaded with tent frames began to arrive. This signaled the start of construction with began in early June. Within a short time, construction of two 5,000' concrete runways aligned E/W (09/27) and NW/SE (14/32) began to the original design of the ground station and over the next several months the once overgrown and vacant land was converted into an Army Air Base. A third runway, aligned NE/SW (05/22) was later added in the spring of 1943. The ground station initially had few amenities, but eventually would be ready for it task of training personnel for the Service Groups.

=== 27th Service Group ===
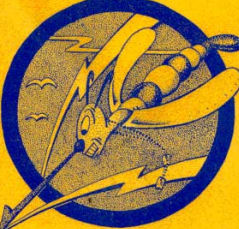
Emblem of the 27th Service Group

The 27th Service Group would have the mission of training new Service Groups prior to their deployment to the overseas combat Air Forces. The advance element of the 27th, the 37th Service Squadron arrived at the station in July 1942 to perform guard duty and to prepare the base for an official opening. The Air Force opened the station, initially named the Service Group Training Center officially on July 7, and it was placed under the jurisdiction of Air Service Command. Over the next several weeks, additional personnel were assigned (the Hq. & Hq. Sq. and the 826th QM Company. Later, the 1063rd Signal Co., the 90th Service Sq., and the 1728th, 1729th, 2064th and 2065th QM Companies)

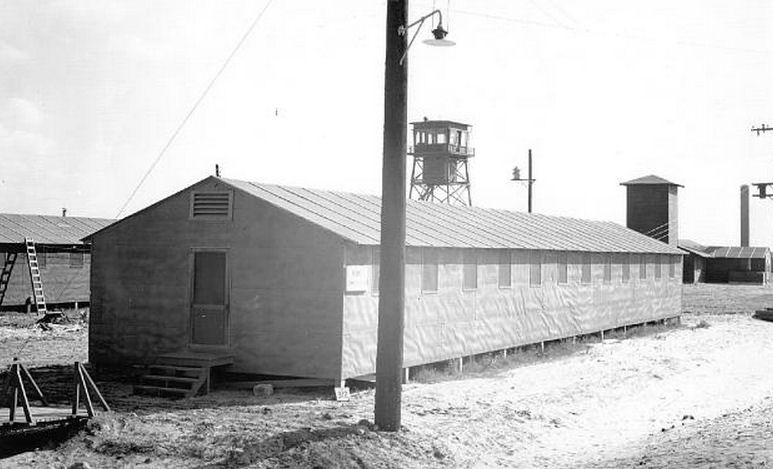
Wartime tar paper barracks commonly found on temporary training airfields such as Venice AAF

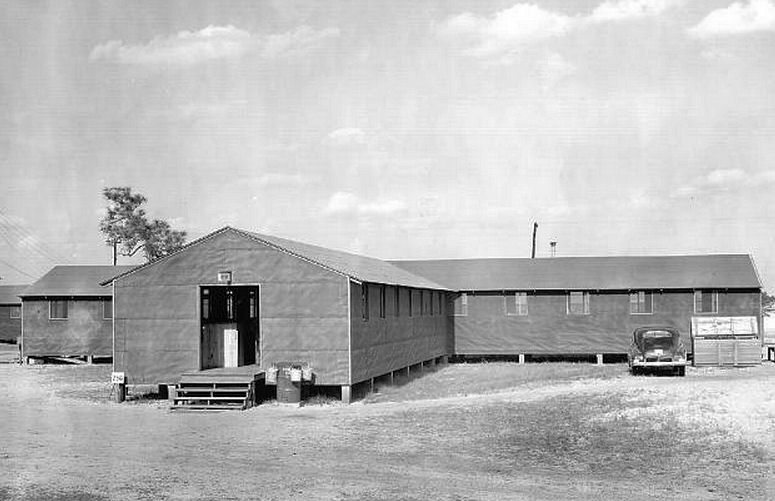
A common type of building found were orderly rooms and ground training classrooms such as this

Although open, the station was far from ready to perform its mission. Early life at the Service Group Training Center is officially described as "rugged". Necessity demanded that the skilled specialists of the 27th be put to work pulling stumps, cutting weeds and doing general clean-up jobs. No furloughs were given, and the men lived in tents.

During the balance of 1942, the primitive living condition at the base were improved. Construction of a large number of facilities based on standardized plans and architectural drawings, with the buildings designed to be the "cheapest, temporary character with structural stability only sufficient to meet the needs of the service which the structure is intended to fulfill during the period of its contemplated war use" was underway. To conserve critical materials, most facilities were constructed of wood, concrete, brick, gypsum board and concrete asbestos. Metal was sparsely used. The station was designed to be nearly self-sufficient, with not only hangars, but barracks, warehouses, hospitals, dental clinics, dining halls, and maintenance shops were needed. There were libraries, social clubs for officers, and enlisted men, and stores to buy living necessities. Finally, in December 1942, the first training unit, 80th Service Group arrived and the mission of the Service Group Training Center began.

However, it was found that the men of the 80th Service Group, had not received any technical training prior to their arrival at Venice. Training would have to be performed at Venice and as a result, their deployment overseas would have to be delayed. The school had to make significant changes to its curriculum that would include basic military indoctrination and technical instruction in the jobs the men would be to accommodate instruction on skills which the men were expected to have when deployed overseas. As a result, several new courses of instruction were added to the planned syllabus. As a result, when new units arrived for training, the training status of the men would be reviewed, and those requiring additional training were immediately assigned to the appropriate schools.

Factory-staffed engine schools operated at the base to enhance training efficiency. A school, taught by Allison taught courses on the intricacies of the engines which powered the P-40 Warhawk and P-38 Lightning. Additional schools taught by Rolls-Royce, Curtiss-Wright and Pratt & Whitney followed. An Air Force Supply School was added, and a First Sergeants School was also created that taught procedures on administering the base stations for combat groups. In addition to the schools, there were courses taught in the application of camouflage, aircraft identification, booby traps, field sanitation, convoys and bivouacking. All these skills were necessary for the men of the Service Units who would be performing their jobs in primitive areas close to the front lines.

By the end of October 1943, seven service groups had been trained at Venice, and recognition of the school grew and curriculum changes were made by reports back from throughout the far-flung Service Command as turning out men who knew their jobs well. Days whirled by like kaleidoscopic visions as GIs worked hard at learning the skills needed to support the war by day, and filled the theatre, "Beer Garden" (built by the GIs themselves) and the recreation centers of surrounding towns at night.

One of the Service Groups in training was the 14th Service Group, which was made up of Chinese-Americans. The group arrived in early January 1944 and remained at Venice until October. The 14th SG was reputedly formed after a personal request to President Franklin Roosevelt by Madame Chiang Kai-shek. The 400 men of the Service Group trained on P-40 Warhawk pursuit aircraft, P-39 Airacobras, P-47 Thunderbolts, and P-51 Mustangs.

In January 1944 the base was transferred to the jurisdiction of Third Air Force, but Air Service Command units remained for training. The last of these was the 576th Air Service Group, later sent to Guam.

=== III Fighter Command ===
Venice expanded in June 1943 with the addition of Third Air Force Operational Training, with a mission to train combat fighter pilots and ground crewmen. This tied in with Technical Service Command as the training of Service Groups gave both types of groups more realistic training prior to their deployment overseas.

The 13th Fighter Squadron arrived on June 7 from Page Field in Fort Myers, after duty in Panama. The 14th Fighter Squadron arrived a few weeks later. They were flying P-39 Airacobras, later P-47 Thunderbolts, then P-40 Warhawks and finally in early 1945, P-51 Mustangs for combat crew training.

Consolidation and re-organization of Army Air Forces units in 1944 led to Punta Gorda Army Airfield and Page Field at Fort Myers being assigned as sub-bases to Venice AAF. What was originally envisioned as a small Army Anti-Aircraft Artillery base in 1941 had grown to a large training base with responsibly for almost 10,000 men. The Venice Fighter Pilot Replacement Unit was formed by the re-designation of the 13th and 14th Fighter Squadrons on May 1. The 13th was re-designated as "Squadron O"; the 14th became "Squadron T". Flight training consisted of about 80 hours of instruction, which included aerial and ground gunnery; camera gunnery; dive and skip bombing; aerobatics and cross country navigation.

By 1944, Service Group training consisted of about 180 hours, including maintenance of aircraft armament, aircraft and naval ship recognition, medical procedures, Morse Code, Supply, Base Administration and combat intelligence. Including the Service Groups, other units which were trained at Venice AAF were Aviation Engineer, Sanitation, and Provisional Aviation. The actual number of hours of training of both flying and ground personnel varied depending upon the need of the overseas combat Air Forces and other factors.

The Service Group Training Center entered a new phase on February 15, 1945, when the base was officially designated as Venice Army Airfield. More emphasis was placed on the comfort and well-being of enlisted personnel. A centralized Base Headquarters was established, using key personnel of the 27th plus personnel of the 422nd Base Hq. & Air Base Squadron, which operated the Replacement Training Unit. The 749th AAF Band was organized, making possible dances and shows; regular laundry service was set up; The sales commissary was opened; food for the mess halls was purchased locally, insuring fresher and more adequate meals. Most important for morale, a regular furlough policy was established for the permanently assigned personnel.

=== Venice Prisoner of War Camp ===
Upwards of 200 German Prisoners of War were moved to Venice AAF in February 1945 from Camp Blanding. POWs were assigned various manual labor details. Some worked in the motor pool and others were permanently assigned performing various civil engineering duties such as electricians, plumbing, painting and other trades work, depending on their skills. Others worked in the mess halls, medical clinic or in the local Venice community and local farms in the area.

=== Closure ===
As the war began drawing to an end in Europe, and later in the summer of 1945 in the Pacific, the number of trainees and the level of activity at the base was reduced rapidly. With the Japanese surrender and the end of World War II most of the temporary training bases such as Venice Army Airfield were put on inactive status and eventually closed.

Third Air Force began the process of shutting down training activities completely, the field receiving the last class of pilot trainees from the closing Page Field in September. In October Venice AAF received notice that it also would be inactivated by the end of the month. Service Group trainees were processed for separation discharges, and flying training ceased. Aircraft based at Venice AAF were sent to Hunter Field, Georgia along with the few remaining pilot trainees at the base.

The field was decommissioned and the City of Venice was granted a license to operate the airport on Many 20, 1946. On June 10, 1947, by Quit Claim Deed from the United States of America to the City of Venice under provisions of the Surplus Property Act of 1944, the city was designated as sponsor to operate the facility.

== Current status ==
Today, the facility is known as Venice Municipal Airport and two of the three wartime runways are all that remain of the 1,600 acre World War II base. Many of the base structures were sold off and relocated to surrounding communities for commercial or residential use. In addition, the Venice Municipal Mobile Home Park has incorporated the Venice AAF officer's club as their recreational facility.

== Legacy ==
The legacy of the Air Force Service Groups trained at Venice AAF also remains today in the modern United States Air Force. Active duty Air Force, as well as Air Force Reserve and Air National Guard wings are all supported by what today are designated as Maintenance Groups (MXG), Mission Support Groups (MSG) and Medical Groups (MDG), all of which can trace their heritage to the Service Groups of the World War II Air Service Command.

== See also ==
- Florida World War II Army Airfields
