= 183rd Wing =

183rd Wing

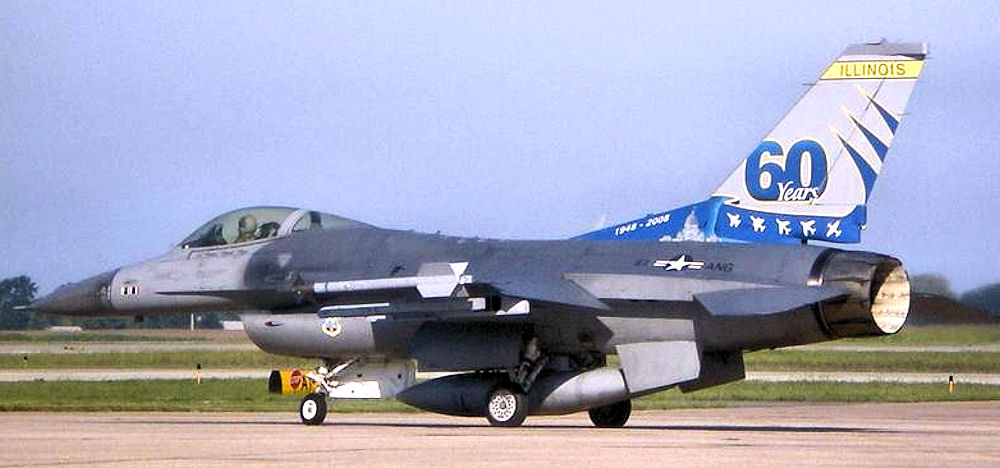
- 170th Fighter Squadron - 60th Anniversary F-16 from the 170th FS leaving Springfield IAP for its final training flight in September 2008 (Note: Aircraft is General Dynamics F-16C Fighting Falcon block 30, serial 87-0296.)
- Active: 15 October 1962-present
- Country: United States
- Allegiance: Illinois
- Branch: Air National Guard
- Type: Wing
- Part of: Illinois Air National Guard
- Garrison/HQ: Capital Airport Air National Guard Station, Springfield, Illinois
- Decorations: Air Force Outstanding Unit Award

Commanders
- Current commander: Colonel Shawn D. Strahle

Insignia
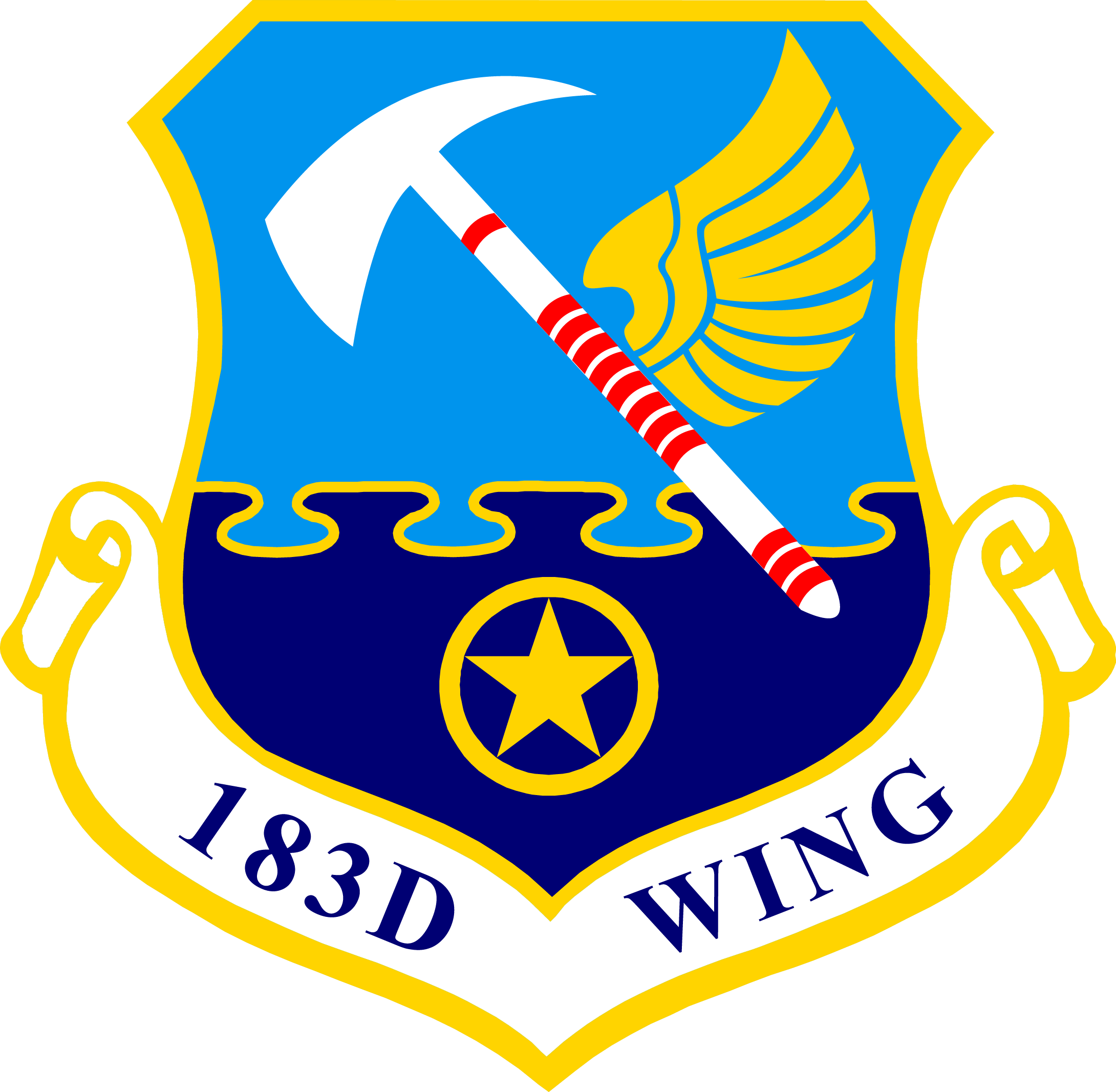
- 183rd Wing emblem

The 183rd Wing is a unit of the Illinois Air National Guard, stationed at Abraham Lincoln Capital Airport in Springfield, Illinois. If activated to federal service, the wing is gained by the United States Air Force Air Combat Command.

== Mission ==
A non-flying wing, the 183rd Wing is tasked with supporting and reinforcing the Component Numbered Air Force in both the air and space operations centers and the Air Force forces staff. The mission of the 183rd Wing is to provide combat-ready airmen to support worldwide contingencies of the Combat Air Forces (CAF) and to operate C-130H aircraft to meet both federal and state airlift requirements.

== Units ==
The primary unit of the 183rd Wing is the 183rd Air Operations Group (183 AOG). The 183 AOG is capable of augmenting C-NAF staffs worldwide, therefore affording AOG personnel the opportunity to train at various locations - CONUS and OCONUS. The role of the AOG is to assist the AOC in organizing, planning, and executing the "air war" in a contingency or campaign and assist the AFFOR staff in bedding down Air Force forces in the theater. The 183rd AOG is aligned with Twelfth Air Force / AFSOUTH at Davis-Monthan AFB, Arizona.

Other units of the 183rd Wing are:

- 183rd Medical Group
- 183rd Mission Support Group
- 183rd Maintenance Squadron

Operates the Centralized Repair Facility

== History ==
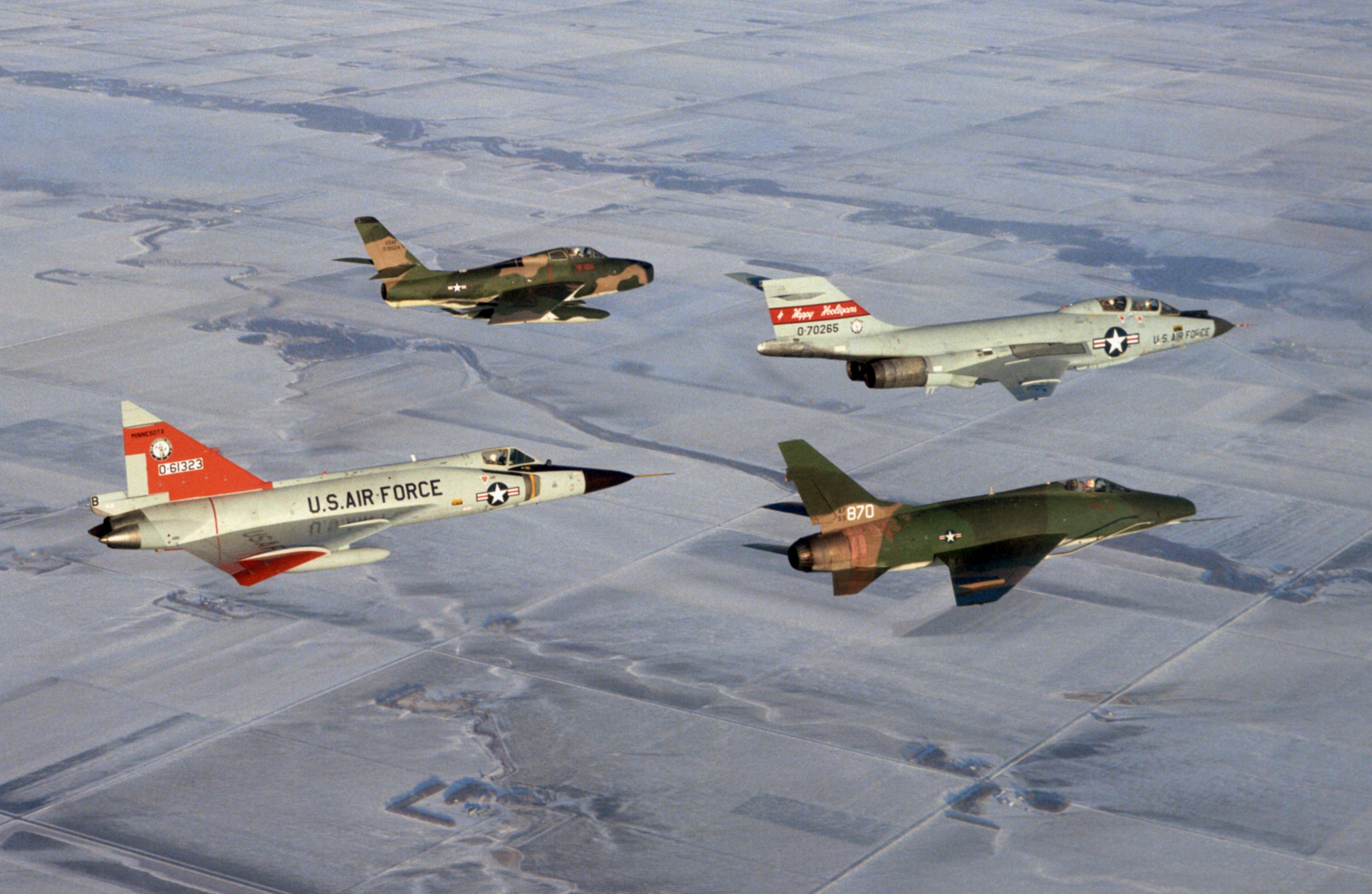
An 183rd F-84F with other ANG fighters in the early 1970s.

On 15 October 1962, the Illinois Air National Guard 170th Tactical Fighter Squadron was authorized to expand to a group level, and the 183rd Tactical Fighter Group was established by the National Guard Bureau. 170th TFS becoming the group's flying squadron. Other squadrons assigned into the group were the 183rd Material Squadron, 183rd Combat Support Squadron, and the 183rd USAF Dispensary.

The 170th Tactical Fighter Squadron was equipped with Republic F-84F Thunderstreaks. It continued to fly the aircraft throughout the 1960s. The squadron was not activated for service during the Vietnam War, although from 1968 to 1971 many of its personnel were activated and some saw service in Southeast Asia. All F-84Fs were grounded in November 1971, after a 170th pilot was killed when his plane lost a wing during exercises at the Hardwood Gunnery Range in Finley, Wisconsin. The accident was caused by the "milkbone" joining bolt in the main wing which had been weakened by years of flying and failed in-flight. All RF-84F aircraft were immediately grounded after inspections of other F-84Fs in the Air National Guard found the same issue affected many other aircraft. The problem was deemed too widespread to justify the economic repair of the aircraft, and it was decided to retire the ANG's fleet of F-84Fs and replace them with more modern aircraft. In 1972 the 170th F-84s were given a 2G ferry flight permit to the Aerospace Maintenance and Regeneration Center at Davis-Monthan Air Force Base, the 170th having the distinction of flying the F-84F longer than any other USAF/ANG squadron.

In January 1972, the 183rd Fighter Group was the first Air National Guard unit to receive the McDonnell F-4C Phantom II, with its aircraft being Vietnam War aircraft that were returning from Southeast Asia. Along with the F-4C, a flight of RF-4C Phantom II reconnaissance aircraft were received. In 1981, the F-4Cs were exchanged for the F-4D Phantom II.

=== Post Cold War era ===
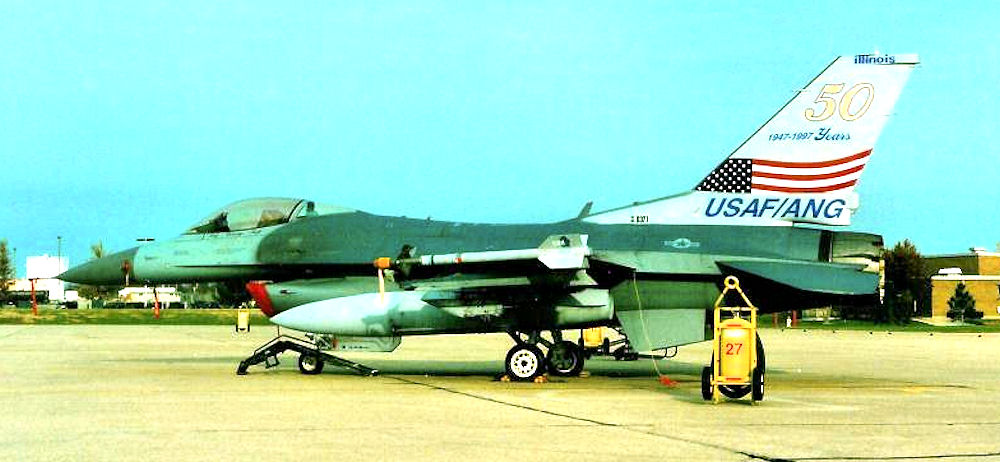
F-16C adorned with the USAF/ANG 50th anniversary markings in 1997 (Note: Aircraft is General Dynamics F-16C block 30 Fighting Falocon, serial 86-0371.)

The 170th saw its first General Dynamics F-16A Fighting Falcon on 7 June 1989 when two landed at Capital Airport to replace the aging F-4D Phantom II. By 5 May 1990, the 170th TFS was operational with the F-16A. Its mission at the time was fighter attack and was provided the Block 15 for this job. On 15 March 1992 the squadron changed designation from the 170th Tactical Fighter Squadron to the 170th Fighter Squadron when its parent 183rd Fighter Group adopted the new Air Force Objective organization plan.

During early 1994 the 170th FS started to exchange their Block 15 F-16A/B for Block 30 F-16C/D Fighting Falcon with the big inlet design. Most of the Block 15s were retired straight to AMARC. During the 1990s, the unit conducted numerous overseas deployments, including six to Southwest Asia, two to Denmark, one to Panama, one to Curaçao, and one to Thailand.

=== Global War on Terrorism ===
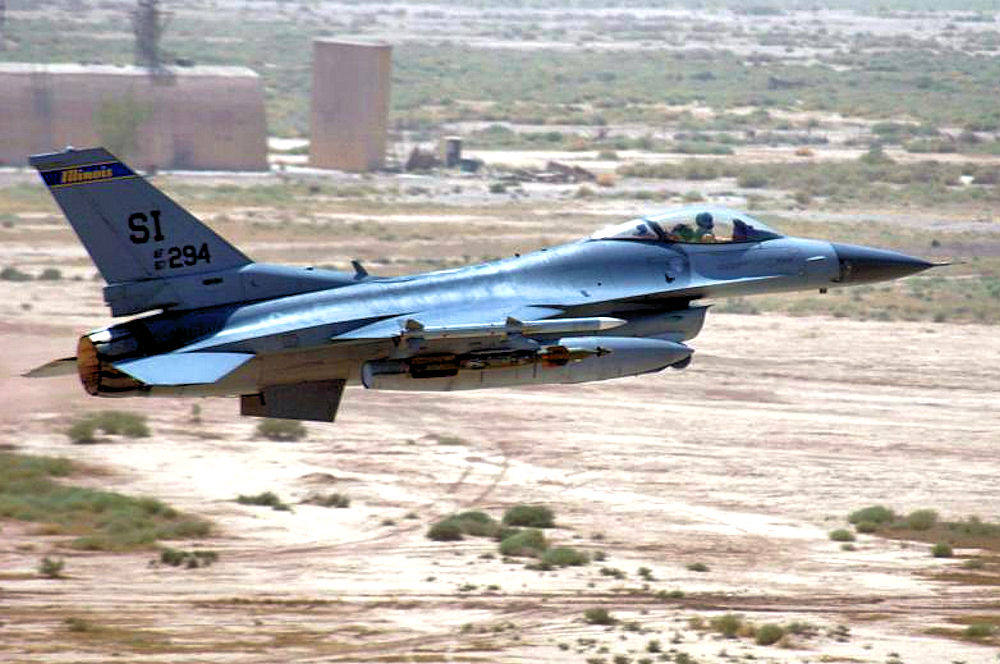
170th Expeditionary Fighter Squadron F-16C takes off from Balad AB, Iraq on an Operation Iraqi Freedom mission on 21 July 2006 (Note: Aircraft is General Dynamics F-16C Fighting Flcon, serial 87-0294.)

After the 11 September 2001, attack, the 170th Squadron increased its capability by obtaining AN/AAQ-28(V) LITENING targeting pods in October 2001. Training with the new pod started immediately and included some internal personnel as some were trained on use of the pod as well as training from the Wisconsin Air National Guard. The purpose of the training was to get ready for deployment in March 2002 for Operation Enduring Freedom.

Starting in January 2002 the 170th deployed for two weeks to Tucson Air National Guard Base, Arizona for final training with the LITENING pod. Initially the deployment in March 2002 was to be with two other ANG units but this changed due to Operation Noble Eagle air defense commitments. As a result, the 170th deployed by itself as the 170th Expeditionary Fighter Squadron (170 EFS). When the 170th EFS arrived it replaced the 18th EFS which was normally based at Eielson Air Force Base in Alaska. On top of duties over Afghanistan, the 170th FS also had to perform air interdiction missions over Iraq in support of Operation Southern Watch.

In the very early morning on 17 April 2002 while on deployment in Afghanistan a pilot in a two-ship formation from the 170th FS mistakenly bombed a Canadian force which was practicing live firing of its weapons near Kandahar, Afghanistan. Four soldiers were killed and eight were injured. This tragedy dogged the 170th FS for years and a trial against the pilots began in Springfield.

After more than two consecutive years deployed overseas the 170th FS participated in Operation Iraqi Freedom when they deployed to the region in October 2004.

=== BRAC 2005 ===
The 2005 Base Realignment and Closure Commission committee report recommended the retirement of the block 30 F-16 Fighting Falcon, and the inactivation of the 170th Fighter Squadron. Despite challenges by the governor of Illinois in federal court, the aircraft began to be retired, and ultimately the US District Judge stated that there was not enough evidence to support that the region would suffer major harm by the closure of the unit. The last F-16 departed on 23 September 2008, marking the end of the flying mission for the 183rd Fighter Wing.

Due to the outstanding quality of work historically exhibited by the 183rd Fighter Wing, the new mission outlined by the BRAC commission recommended the facilities and notable skill sets of personnel assigned be realigned into a Centralized Intermediate Repair Facility.

=== Current status ===
Since BRAC, the 183rd has been given an additional follow-on mission. The Component Numbered Air Force, including an Air and Space Operations Center and an Air Force forces staff, is an aerospace operation planning, execution, and assessment system for the Joint Forces Air Component Commander. It is the primary tool for commanding and executing air, space and cyber power.

The 183rd Air Operations Group will augment Air Force headquarters staffs in planning, coordinating, allocating, tasking and controlling air, space and cyber operations in a theater of operations.

On 2 November 2014, the 183rd Fighter Wing welcomed Colonel John Patterson as their new Commander. Colonel Patterson replaced Colonel (now Major General) Ron Paul.

On 4 March 2017, the 183rd Fighter Wing was redesignated as the 183rd Wing.

== Lineage ==
- Designated 183rd Tactical Fighter Group and allotted to the Air National Guard on 11 September 1962

Extended federal recognition and activated on 15 October 1962
Redesignated 183rd Fighter Group on 15 March 1992
Redesignated 183rd Fighter Wing on 11 October 1995
Redesignated 183rd Wing on 4 March 2017

=== Assignments ===
- Illinois Air National Guard, 15 October 1962

Gained by: Tactical Air Command
Gained by: Air Combat Command, 1 June 1992 - present

=== Components ===
- 183rd Operations Group, c. 1 March 1994 – 30 September 2008
- 170th Tactical Fighter (later Fighter) Squadron, 15 October 1962 – c. 1 March 1994

=== Stations ===
- Capital Airport Air National Guard Station, Illinois, 15 October 1962 – present

=== Aircraft ===
- Republic F-84F Thunderstreak, 1962–1971
- McDonnell F-4C Phantom II, 1972–1981
- McDonnall RF-4C Phantom II, 1973–1975

- McDonnell F-4D Phantom II, 1981–1989
- General Dynamics F-16A Block 15 Fighting Falcon, 1989–1994
- General Dynamics F-16B Block 15 Fighting Falcon, 1989–1994
- General Dynamics F-16C Block 30 Fighting Falcon, 1994–2008
- General Dynamics F-16D Block 30 Fighting Falcon, 1994–2008

=== Decorations ===
- Air Force Outstanding Unit Award
