= Page Field Army Airfield =

Former United States Army Air Forces base

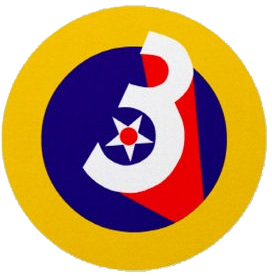
Page Field Army Airfield
- Part of Third Air Force
- Fort Myers, Florida
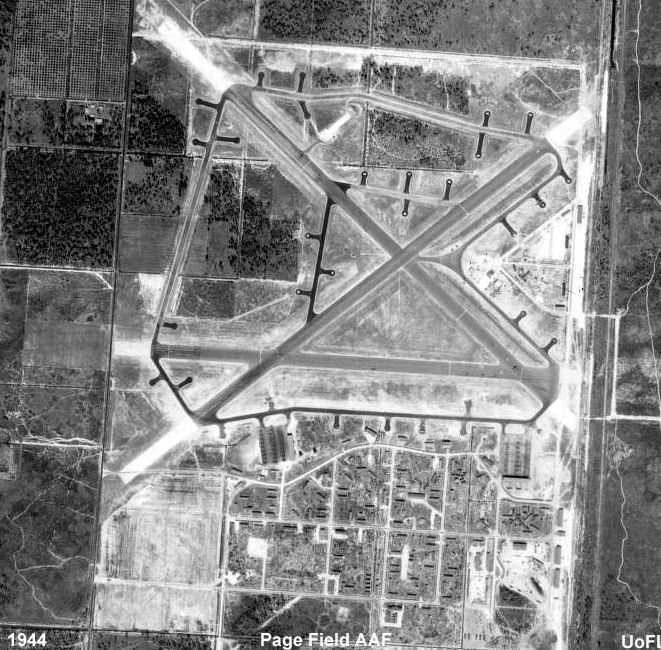
- Page Field Army Airfield – 1944

Location
- Coordinates: 26°35′12″N 081°51′48″W

Site history
- Built: 1927
- Built by: United States Air Force
- In use: 1942–1946
- Battles/wars: World War II

Page Field Army Airfield' was a United States Army Air Forces base, approximately 4 miles south of Fort Myers, Florida. It was active during World War II as a Third Air Force training airfield. It was closed on 30 September 1945, two years prior to the establishment of the United States Air Force as an independent service.

Today, the facility is Page Field, a civilian general aviation reliever airport. Prior to the construction of Southwest Florida International Airport in the 1980s, it also served as a commercial service airport for the Fort Myers / Lee County area.

== History ==
In 1924, the city of Fort Myers, Florida, purchased 670 acres of land south of the city with the intention of developing it into a municipal golf course. However, that plan was halted when a Florida "Land Bust" stopped development.

In 1927, it became a civil airport named "Palmetto Field", for the large amount of palmetto brush growing in and around the airport. National Airlines commenced regular flights into the airfield in 1937, but those were soon discontinued due to the poor landing conditions. Efforts to upgrade the airfield were boosted by a January 1940 Works Projects Administration (WPA) project constructed three concrete runways. In addition, other improvements were made and by the time of the Pearl Harbor Attack, "Lee County Airport" had grown to about 600 acres in size.

=== World War II ===
With the United States at war, the War Department decided to lease the airport from Lee County, and the initial lease for its military use was signed in February 1942, and later renewed in June 1944. The airport was turned over to the jurisdiction of the United States Army Air Forces, who assigned it to Third Air Force. At first, the USAAF called the airport Fort Myers Army Air Base; eventually the field would be named Page Field to honor Captain Richard Page, a World War I aviator killed in a seaplane accident near Everglades, Florida on March 3, 1920. Captain Page was the first person from Florida to join the Aviation Section, U.S. Signal Corps. During World War I, he was credited with three German aircraft destroyed in combat and was the recipient of the Distinguished Service Cross along with the French Croix de Guerre and other awards.

Along with the existing airport, the ground support station at Page Field construction of a large number of facilities based on standardized plans and architectural drawings, with the buildings designed to be the "cheapest, temporary character with structural stability only sufficient to meet the needs of the service which the structure is intended to fulfill during the period of its contemplated war use." To conserve critical materials, most facilities were constructed of wood, concrete, brick, gypsum board and concrete asbestos. Metal was sparsely used. Page Field was designed to be nearly self-sufficient, with not only hangars, but barracks, warehouses, hospitals, dental clinics, dining halls, and maintenance shops were needed. There were libraries, social clubs for officers, and enlisted men, and stores to buy living necessities. Page Field was officially opened as an operational base on 25 April 1943.

==== III Bomber Command ====
The first use of the airfield was by the 98th Bombardment Group, which had been formed at MacDill Field, near Tampa in February 1942, and was moved to Barksdale Field, Louisiana for equipping and personnel assignment. It arrived at Page Field on 30 March 1942 while the base was under construction, such was the need for the facility in the early part of the war. At Page Field, the B-24 Liberator bomber crews practiced formation flying, and other combat maneuvers for about six weeks which they would need for combat missions. The training also included anti-submarine patrols over the Gulf of Mexico, Florida Keys and the southeast Florida Atlantic coast.

The 98th departed in mid-May and wound up in British Palestine in July as part of Ninth Air Force. They were replaced by the 93d Bombardment Group, which also moved in from Barksdale Field on 15 May. The 93d also trained with B-24 Liberators. In August, the 336th Bombardment Group arrived with Martin B-26 Marauders from MacDill Field, The 93d moved out to England in September to become part of Eighth Air Force; the 336th was moved to Lake Charles Army Air Field, Louisiana where it became a training unit for medium bomber pilots and aircrews.

==== III Fighter Command ====
In January 1943, the 53d Fighter Group was moved to Page Field from Sixth Air Force in Panama. From this point on, the mission of the base became the training of replacement single-engine fighter pilots. Aircraft used for training consisted of Bell P-39 Airacobras and later, Republic P-47 Thunderbolts and Curtiss P-40 Warhawks. North American P-51 Mustangs began to arrive in early 1945 as well.

Pilots received about 80–90 hours of flight training, the number of hours was based on the needs overseas by the combat units. Some pilots received perhaps 60 hours. They initially received orientation flights in a basic trainer, then an advanced AT-6 Texans and then were checked out on the P-39. The major part of their flight instruction included aerobatics, gunnery practice at Buckingham Field, and formation flying.

By 1944, Page Field was in full swing, and the base population in January was 276 officers and 1,393 enlisted. By 1944 the P-39 had been phased out and the pilots were using the Republic P-47 Thunderbolt. Later a less capable aircraft, the Curtiss P-40 arrived and trainees split their time of both aircraft. On 1 May 1944 the 53d Fighter Group was inactivated and replaced by the Page Replacement Training Unit (PRTU), which was part of an administrative change by Third Air Force to streamline the organization of the base.

Compared to the training bases, Page Field was a small facility. Buckingham Field, located about four miles east had a total area of 83,000 acres and had over 16,000 men and women assigned. The smallness of the facility was the main reason that Page Field was classified as a sub-base of MacDill Field; later Sarasota Army Airfield. As a result, Page did not receive the same level of attention from Third Air Force as a base operating under its own authority.

A significant change in the training program took place in March 1945 with the arrival of the P-51D Mustang. The P-51s replaced the obsolete P-40s, and was a state-of-the-art fighter.

=== Closure ===
As the war began drawing to an end in Europe, and later in the summer of 1945 in the Pacific, the number of trainees and the level of activity at the base was reduced rapidly. With the Japanese surrender and the end of World War II most of the temporary training bases such as Page Field were put on inactive status and eventually closed.

Third Air Force began the process of shutting down training activities completely, the field receiving notice in early September 1945 that it would revert to inactive status at the end of the month. Trainees in the last class were sent to Venice Army Airfield and Sarasota Army Airfield to complete their training.

At the end of September 1945, there were three aircraft left at Page AAF. An AT-6, a P-51 and a C-45 courier transport. The lease was terminated by the War Department and the training airfield was returned to Lee County by the end of December.

Today, much of the World War II Army Air Forces use of Page Field is still evident. Some of the student officers quarters remain, and the former officers' club is now a manufacturing firm for small boats. The baseball field is still in use, and some of the parking revetments can still be seen in aerial photography. The base chapel remains, and other buildings can be found in "Page Park", the redeveloped base station of the former airfield to the south of the airfield.

== See also ==
- Florida World War II Army Airfields
