= Perry–Foley Airport =

Airport in Florida, U.S.

Perry–Foley Airport Perry Army Airfield
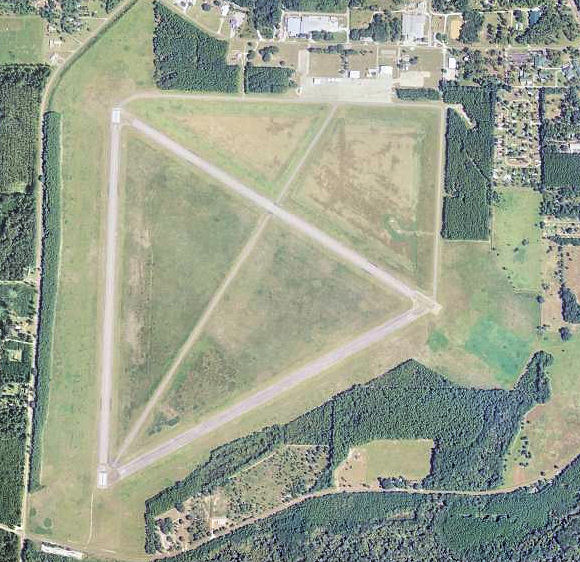
- 2006 USGS airphoto
- IATA: FPY; ICAO: KFPY; FAA LID: FPY

Summary
- Airport type: Public use
- Owner: Taylor County, Florida
- Operator: Ward Ketring Airport Manager
- Serves: Perry, Florida
- Location: Taylor County, Florida
- Elevation AMSL: 45 ft / 14 m
- Coordinates: 30°04′20″N 083°34′42″W
- Website: Perry-Foley Airport

Map
- Location of Perry–Foley Airport FPY (the United States)

Runways
Direction	Length		Surface
Direction	ft	m	Surface
12/30	4,754	1,449	Asphalt
18/36	5,013	1,528	Asphalt

Statistics (2017)
- Aircraft operations: 18,400
- Based aircraft: 11
- Source: Federal Aviation Administration

Perry–Foley Airport (IATA: FPY, ICAO: KFPY, FAA LID: FPY) is a public-use airport located 3 miles (4.8 km) south of the central business district of the city of Perry in Taylor County, Florida, United States. The airport is publicly owned.

== History ==
During World War II, the airfield was constructed and used by the Third Air Force of the United States Army Air Forces for training.

Developed on 862 acres (3.49 km^{2}), Perry Army Airfield became operational on 9 June 1943 as a sub-base to Dale Mabry Army Airfield in Tallahassee, Florida under the authority of the 338th Fighter Group of the Third Air Force.

Perry AAF was a replacement training unit, hosting the 312th and 441st Fighter Squadrons. Pilots received their final training in P-40 Warhawks, P-47 Thunderbolts, and P-51 Mustangs at Perry AAF prior to joining operational units in the European or Pacific theaters.

With the close of hostilities, the last military pilots left Perry AAF in September 1945. The airfield was subsequently deeded to Taylor County by the War Assets Administration in April 1947, and the field reverted to civilian aviation purposes. It has been used as a general aviation airfield ever since.

== See also ==
- Florida World War II Army Airfields
- List of airports in Florida
