= Dale Mabry =

American World War I aviator (1891–1922)

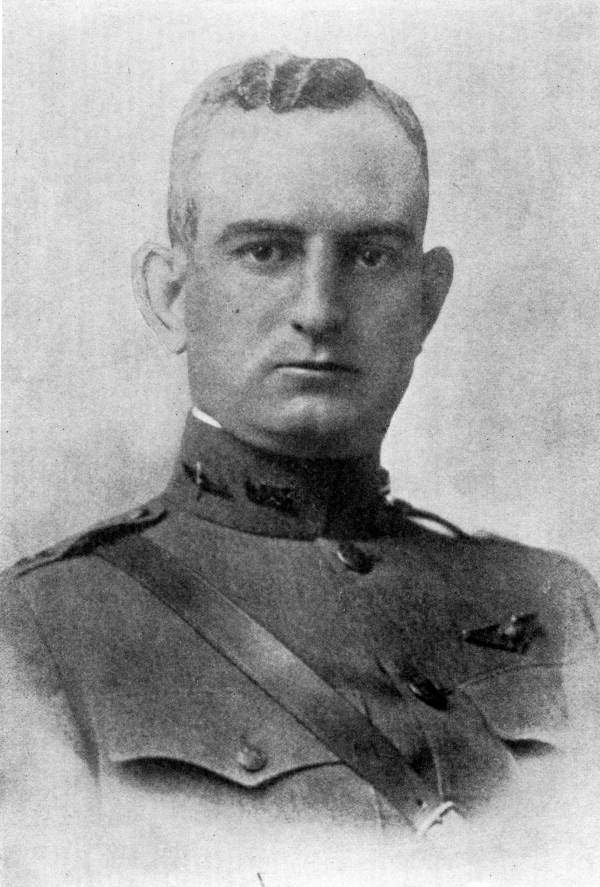
- Born: March 22, 1891; Tallahassee, Florida, U.S.
- Died: February 21, 1922 (aged 30); Norfolk, Virginia, U.S.
- Occupation: aviator

Dale Mabry (March 22, 1891 – February 21, 1922) was an American World War I aviator.

Mabry, a native of Tallahassee, Florida, was the son of former Florida Supreme Court Justice Milton H. Mabry and Ella Dale Bramlett. He went on to become an airship pilot and captain in the United States Army Air Service. Captain Mabry died at age 30 while commanding the Army dirigible Roma when it crashed and exploded in Norfolk, Virginia on February 21, 1922. The event marked the greatest disaster in American aeronautics up to that time, resulting in 34 deaths. Mabry was buried in Arlington National Cemetery. He was survived by a brother, G. E. Mabry, of Tampa, Florida.

Dale Mabry Highway in Tampa, Florida is named for him. It was initially constructed to connect what was then MacDill Field, now MacDill Air Force Base, with then-Drew Field Municipal Airport, now Tampa International Airport. It is a major, highly commercialized roadway through Hillsborough County. Landmarks on this road include Hillsborough Community College, Raymond James Stadium, and George M. Steinbrenner Field. Also in Tampa, Dale Mabry Elementary School is named in his honor. A Tampa restaurant originally named Dale 1891 in his honor was remodeled and renamed during season 4 of Bar Rescue.

Dale Mabry Municipal Airport in Tallahassee, Florida, that city's first airport, also bore his name. The original Tallahassee Airport location was on Dale Mabry Field, a World War II U.S. Army Air Corps, later U.S. Army Air Forces flight training facility.
