= 306th Fighter Squadron =

306th Fighter Squadron

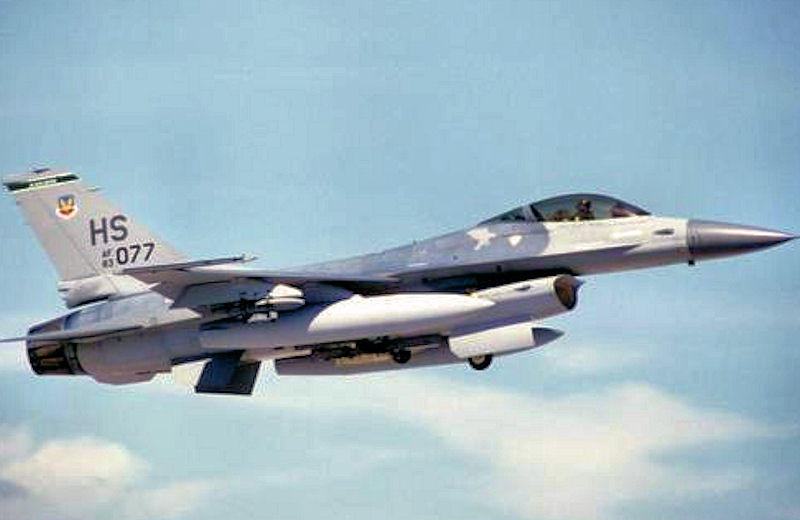
- Squadron F-16 Fighting Falcon (Note: Aircraft is General Dynamics F-16A Fighting Falcon Block 15 serial 83-1077 taking off during the 'Long Rifle III' competition at MacDill AFB on 28 August 1987. The semi-annual air-to-ground gunnery competition tests tactical air crews' abilities to plan and execute long-range missions, execute attacks on first-look targets and accurately deliver ordnance. This aircraft was retired to Aerospace Maintenance and Regeneration Center as FG0303 15 December 1994. It was transferred to the Portuguese Air Force in 1999 as FAP 15134 under Peace Atlantis II.)
- Active: 1957–1970; 1970–1971; 1978–1983; 1985–1986; 2022–present
- Country: United States
- Branch: United States Air Force
- Role: Fighter
- Part of: Air Combat Command
- Nickname: The Gunners
- Colors: Green (1957–1959), Red (1959 – early 1960s), (Note: Squadron color discontinued in 1960s when aircraft were camouflaged, but later resumed in Vietnam.) Gold 1970–1971, Yellow (1978–1983)
- Decorations: Presidential Unit Citation; Air Force Outstanding Unit Award with Combat V Air Force Outstanding Unit Award; Vietnamese Gallantry Cross with Palm

Insignia
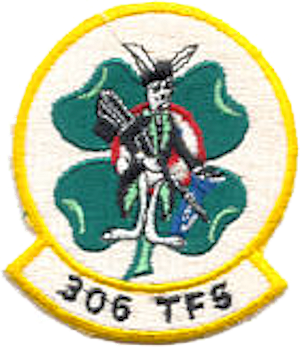
- 306th Tactical Fighter Squadron emblem

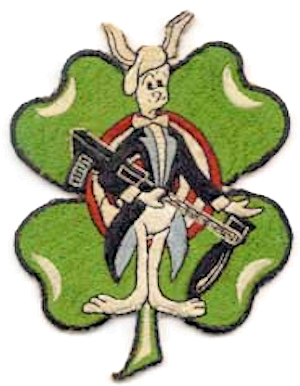
- Original form of squadron emblem (Note: Approved 6 October 1958. Lahue, Factsheet)
- Tail Codes: SD (1966–1970), ZD(1970–1971), ZF (1978) HS(after 1980) AC (2022-Present)

The 306th Fighter Squadron is an active United States Air Force unit. It was most recently activated as an active associate unit of the 119th Fighter Squadron of the New Jersey Air National Guard, stationed at Atlantic City Municipal Airport.

The squadron was first activated as the 306th Fighter-Bomber Squadron in 1957 when the 31st Fighter-Bomber Wing expanded from three to four squadrons and was equipped with the North American F-100 Super Sabre. In 1965 it deployed with its "Huns" to Vietnam, where it engaged in combat until returning to the United States in 1970. It was inactivated in 1971 but was active at Homestead Air Force Base, Florida for two brief periods in the 1970s with the McDonnell F-4 Phantom II and 1980s with the General Dynamics F-16 Fighting Falcon. In 2022, this squadron was reactivated as the 306th Fighter Squadron as an associate unit of 177th Fighter Wing of New Jersey Air National Guard

== History ==
=== Initial activation ===
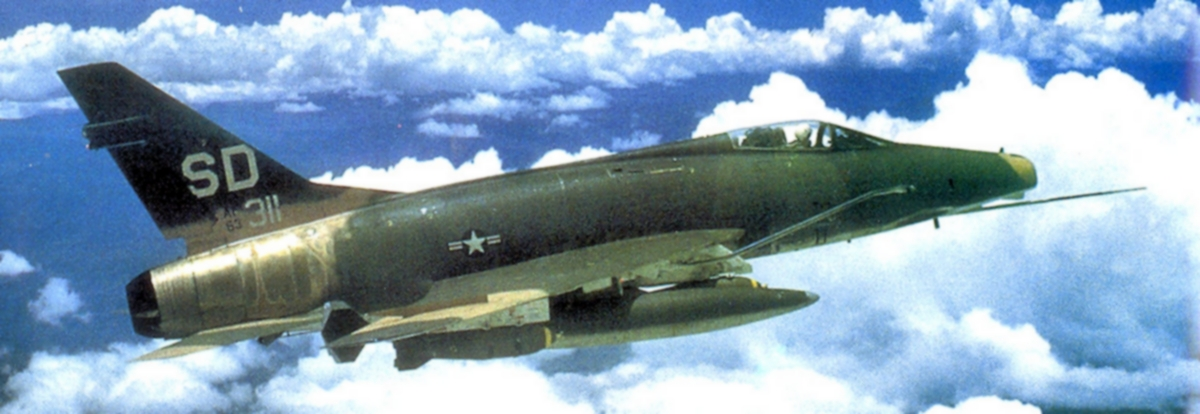
306th Squadron F-100D Super Sabre (Note: Aircraft is North American F-100D-90-NA Super Sabre serial 56-3311 with a full bomb load after takeoff from Tuy Hoa AB, South Vietnam in 1967)

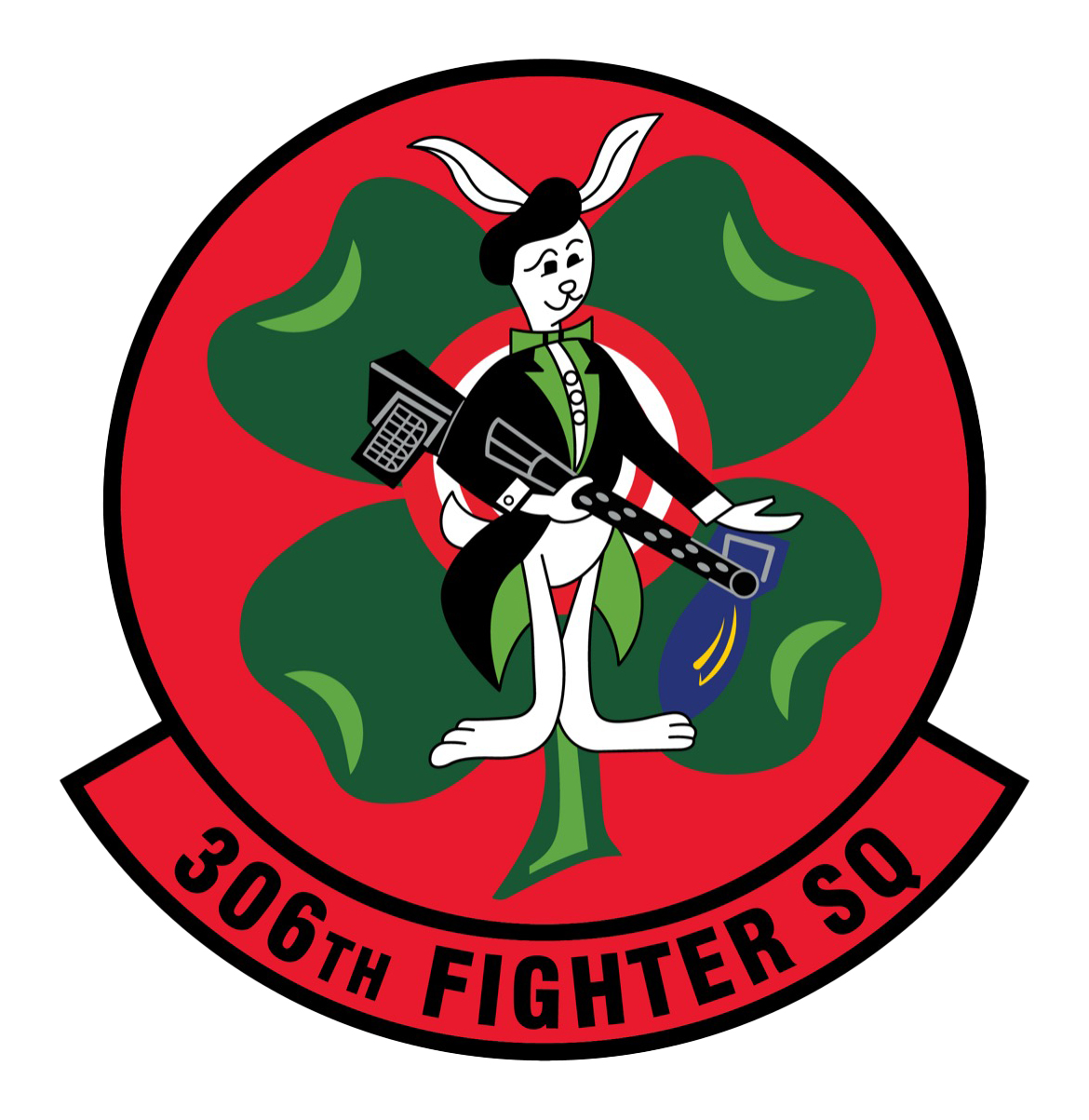
306th Fighter Squadron emblem

The squadron was first activated at Turner Air Force Base, Georgia in September 1957 when the 31st Fighter-Bomber Wing expanded from three to four squadrons, flying North American F-100 Super Sabres. In the spring of 1959, Turner was transferred from Tactical Air Command to Strategic Air Command and the 31st Wing and its components became non-operational and transferred on paper to George Air Force Base, California. Most of the squadron's Super Sabres were transferred to the 356th Tactical Fighter Squadron at Myrtle Beach Air Force Base, South Carolina. At George the squadron assumed the personnel and F-100s of the 1st Tactical Fighter Squadron, which was simultaneously inactivated. Between 1960 and 1963 the squadron deployed four times to Aviano Air Base, Italy to augment United States Air Forces Europe strike forces in the Mediterranean.

The squadron moved to Homestead Air Force Base, Florida in June 1962. During the Cuban Missile Crisis the squadron assumed an air defense alert posture from October until tensions eased in November 1962. It continued training and participation in exercises with deployments to both Europe and the Pacific. In 1965, the squadron deployed to Bien Hoa Air Base, Vietnam and in March 1966, when the 31st Wing moved from Homestead to Tuy Hoa Air Base, the squadron moved to join it.

=== Combat in southeast Asia ===
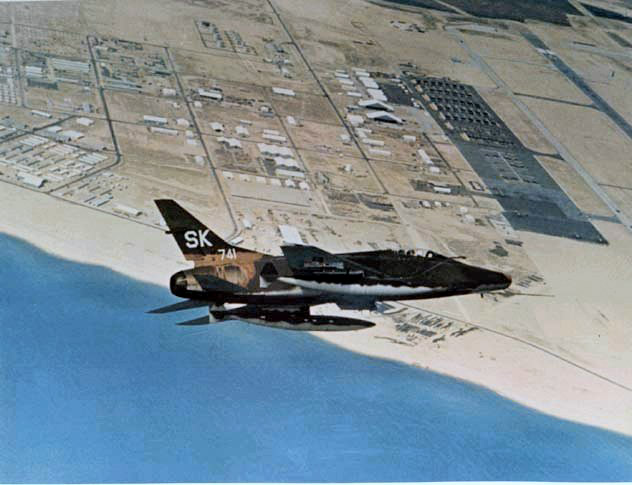
An F-100 Super Sabre flies over the base at Tuy Hoa, South Vietnam in 1967

The 306th engaged in combat operations in South Vietnam from 1965 until 1970, earning a Presidential Unit Citation, an Air Force Outstanding Unit Award with Combat V and Air Force Outstanding Unit Award, as well as a Vietnamese Gallantry Cross with Palm from the Republic of Viet Nam. In 1970, the Air Force began implementing Operation Keystone, which was the withdrawal of units from Vietnam in the process of "Vietnamization." However, withdrawal was primarily governed by budgetary reasons and troop ceilings imposed by Congress. In the fall of 1970, under Project Keystone Robin Alfa, the 31st Wing and its squadrons returned to the United States.

=== Return to the United States ===
The 306th was briefly a paper unit at England Air Force Base, Louisiana, but on 31 October the 31st Wing was re-established at Homestead Air Force Base, where it replaced the 4531st Tactical Fighter Wing, which was discontinued. At Homestead, the squadron took over McDonnell F-4E Phantom IIs formerly flown by the 4531st. The squadron was inactivated in July 1971.

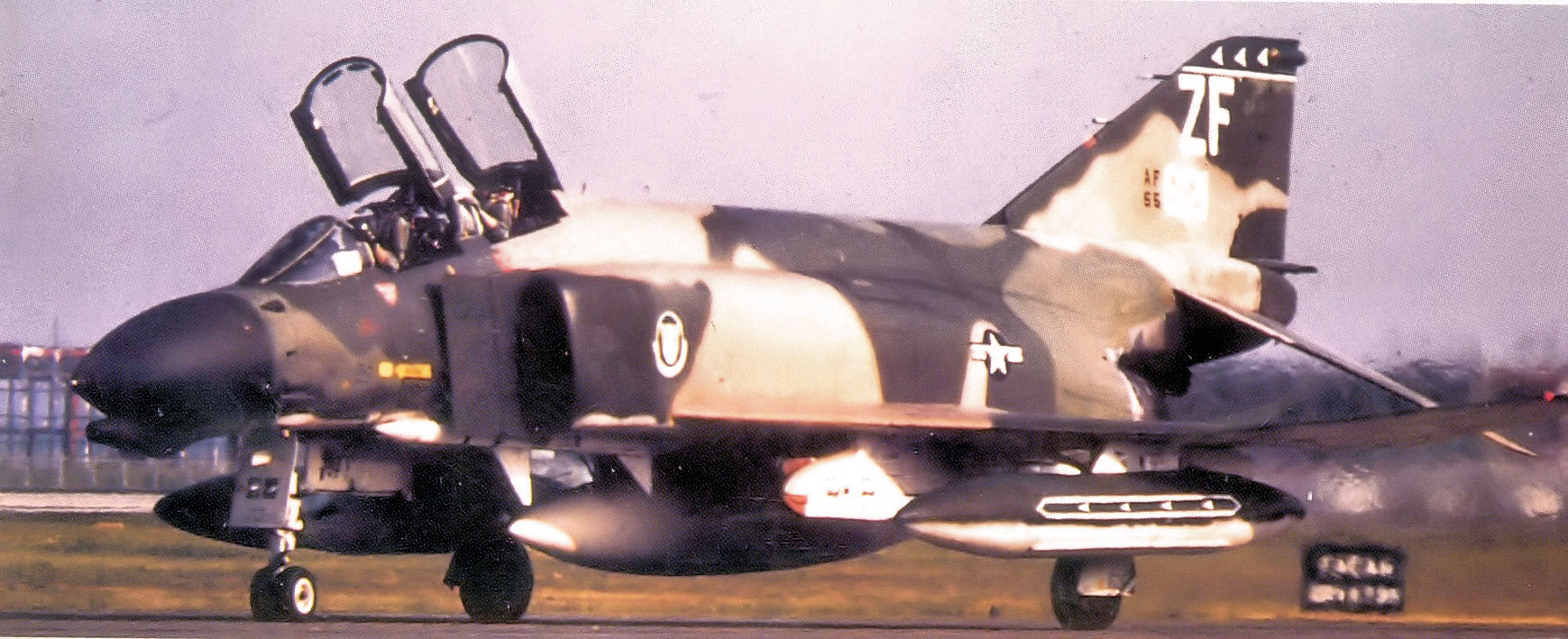
306th Squadron F-4D Phantom (Note: Aircraft is McDonnell F-4D-27-MC Phantom serial 65-621 at Homestead AFB, Florida in 1981. This aircraft crashed 68 nautical miles East Southeast of Key West, Florida on 5 July 1983.)

The 306th was reactivated in July 1978 and served as a F-4E replacement training unit, as the 31st again added a fourth squadron. It replaced its F-4Es with F-4Ds in 1980. The squadron was inactive from 1983 until 1985, when it activated with mixture of F-16A/B Block 15 Fighting Falcons for combat readiness operations. It was inactivated after about a year and its aircraft and personnel transferred to the 308th Fighter Squadron.

=== Active associate unit ===
The squadron was redesignated the 306th Fighter Squadron and activated at Atlantic City Air National Guard Base on 8 July 2022 as an active associate of the 119th Fighter Squadron and flies the F-16 Fighting Falcons assigned to the 119th.

== Lineage ==
- Constituted as the 306th Fighter-Bomber Squadron on 30 August 1957

Activated on 25 September 1957
Redesignated 306th Tactical Fighter Squadron on 1 July 1958
Inactivated on 28 September 1970

- Activated on 30 October 1970

Inactivated on 15 July 1971

- Activated on 1 July 1978

Redesignated: 306th Tactical Fighter Training Squadron on 30 March 1981
Inactivated on 1 September 1983

- Redesignated 306th Tactical Fighter Squadron and activated on 1 October 1985

Inactivated on 31 October 1986

- Redesignated 306th Fighter Squadron on 13 April 2022

Activated on 8 July 2022

=== Assignments ===
- 31st Fighter-Bomber Wing (later 31st Tactical Fighter Wing), 25 September 1957 (attached to 7227th Combat Support Group, 8 April – 16 July 1960, 15 February – 1 March 1961, 20 August – 1 September 1961, 18th Tactical Fighter Wing 24 April – 19 July 1962, 7227th Combat Support Group, 27 June – 30 September 1963, 7231st Combat Support Group, 1 May – 8 August 1964, 6251st Tactical Fighter Wing, 7 July 1965 – 27 January 1966)
- 4403rd Tactical Fighter Wing, 23 September 1970
- 31st Tactical Fighter Wing, 30 October 1970 – 15 July 1971
- 31st Tactical Fighter Wing (later 31st Tactical Training Wing), 1 July 1978 – 1 September 1983
- 31st Tactical Fighter Wing, 1 October 1985 – 31 October 1986
- 495th Fighter Group, 8 July 2022 – present

=== Stations ===
- Turner Air Force Base, Georgia, 25 September 1957
- George Air Force Base, California, 1 March 1959 (deployed to Aviano Air Base, Italy, 8 April–16 July 1960, Clark Air Base, Philippines, 15 February–1 March 1961, Eielson Air Force Base, Alaska, 20 August–1 September 1961, Kadena Air Base, Okinawa, after 24 April 1962)
- Homestead Air Force Base, Florida, 1 June 1962 – 6 December 1966 (deployed to Kadena Air Base, Okinawa until 19 July 1962, Itazuke Air Base, Japan, 27 June–30 September 1963, Cigli Air Base, Turkey, 1 May–8 August 1964 and 7 July 1965 – 27 January 1966)
- Tuy Hoa Air Base, South Vietnam, 25 December 1966
- England Air Force Base, Louisiana, 28 September 1970
- Homestead Air Force Base, Florida, 30 October 1970 – 15 July 1971
- Homestead Air Force Base, Florida, 1 July 1978 – 1 September 1983
- Homestead Air Force Base, Florida, 1 October 1985 – 31 October 1986
- Atlantic City International Airport (Atlantic City ANGB), 8 July 2022 – present

=== Aircraft ===
- North American F-100 Super Sabre, 1957–1970
- North American F-100F Super Sabre, 1957–1970
- McDonnell F-4E Phantom II, 1970–1971, 1978–1980
- McDonnell F-4D Phantom II, 1980–1983
- General Dynamics F-16 Fighting Falcon, 1985–1986, 2022-present

=== Commanders ===
- Lt Col Charles "Chuck" Yeager: 06 March 1958- 19 January 1959
- Lt Col Daniel "Yogi" O'Neal: July 2022-June 2025
- Lt Col Dana "Zule" Merrill: June 2025- November 2025
- Lt Col Alexander “Slick” Vane: April 2026-Present
