= Dale Mabry Field =

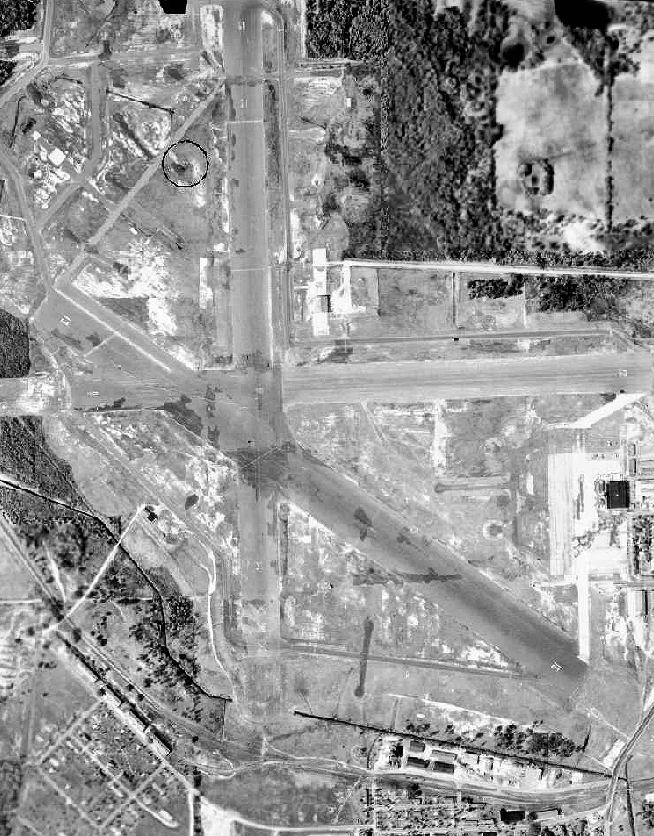
- 1949 airphoto
- IATA: none; ICAO: none

Summary
- Serves: Tallahassee, Florida
- Coordinates: 30°26′15″N 084°20′14″W

Map
- Location of Dale Mabry Field

Ivan Munroe in 1961

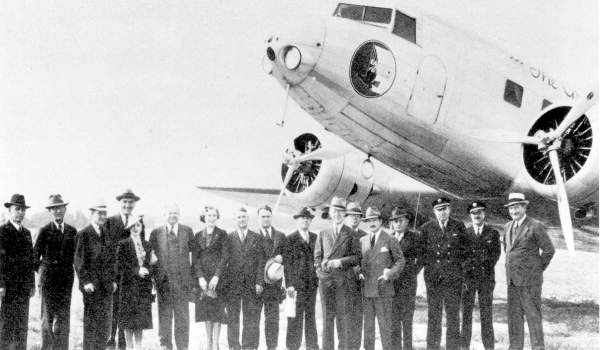
First scheduled flight in 1938 by Eastern Airlines with Douglas DC-2. Airline President Capt. Eddie Rickenbacker is fourth from left. In the photo, left to right, are Ben H. Bridges, Mayor J.R. Jinks, Honorable Robert Ramspect, Captain Eddie Rickenbacker, Mrs. Joe Giddens, Wilet Moore, Mrs. Jewell Puckett, City manager H.P. Ford, Ralph McGill, Colonel C.L. Waller, W.B. Hartsfield, Smythe Gambrel, C.F. Palmer, Paul Brattain, Sidney L. Shannon, Captain W.S. Dawson, W.V. Crowley.

For the World War II use of the airport, see Dale Mabry Army Airfield

Dale Mabry Field is a former airport 3.4 miles (5.5 km) west of Tallahassee, Florida. It was replaced in 1961 by Tallahassee Municipal Airport (now Tallahassee International Airport) and the land is now the campus of Tallahassee State College. Some of the runways are used for parking.

== History ==
=== Origins ===
In 1928 the City of Tallahassee purchased a 200-acre (0.81 km^{2}) tract of land for $7028 for its first municipal airport. The land was previously a dairy farm operated (1910-1928) by Ervin Bostick Revell and Theodore B. Revell.

Once the city purchased it, it was named Dale Mabry Field in honor of Tallahassee native Army Captain Dale Mabry, killed in 1922 while commanding the Army semi-rigid airship Roma on February 21, 1922, which crashed at Norfolk, Virginia. The airfield had one grass runway. The airport was dedicated on November 11, 1929, with its first manager being Ivan Munroe. Munroe was part owner and eventually full owner of Tallahassee's first airplane and was a flight instructor. Munroe also formed the Tallahassee Aircraft Company with Jeff Lewis, Frank Lewis and Dick Weeks after serving as a Navy pilot in the Jacksonville area during World War II. The company offered flight training, aerial photography and charter service.

Atlantic Gulf Coast Airlines began flights at the airport during its first month. By 1934 the airport had 4 sod runways with the longest at 2,600 feet (790 m). (Department of Commerce Airport Directory, 1934).

In 1937 Dale Mabry Field had two paved runways with a single hangar at the northwest corner of the field. In 1938 Eastern Airlines began flying to Memphis, Birmingham, and Montgomery, Alabama. National Airlines began service to Jacksonville, Pensacola, Mobile and New Orleans that year. The manager was listed as Ivan Munroe.

=== World War II ===
In 1940 U.S. Senator Claude Pepper and Florida Governor Spessard Holland influenced the Army to make Dale Mabry Field a United States Army Air Forces airfield. In October 1940 military activity began with the construction of a railroad siding and drainage improvements to overcome the swamp conditions. Hundreds of laborers began clearing swampland for temporary quarters for Dale Mabry Army Air Base. The need to train pilots prompted the federal government to set a 90-day completion deadline. It was used as a fighter training base by III Fighter Command, Third Air Force during the war. In 1945 it was assigned a work detachment of some 126 German prisoners of war as an annex of Camp Gordon Johnston, a larger regional prison camp.

Eastern Airlines and National Airlines continued to use Mabry, but like other civil airports, Mabry was closed to general aviation during World War II. The air base was deactivated in 1945.

=== Postwar use ===
After the war, the barracks on the field were used by male students (mostly veterans) attending the Florida State College for Women under a program called the "Tallahassee Branch of the University of Florida" (TBUF). In 1947 the Florida State College for Women became the coeducational Florida State University. The TBUF program was then discontinued. The areas of Dale Mabry Field used by these students were called "West Campus".

The airport was the airline airport for Tallahassee in the 1940s and 1950s, but the encroachment of the urban area led to the need for a new airport. Tallahassee Municipal Airport opened in 1961, and Dale Mabry Field was closed.

== Tallahassee Community College ==
The land was redeveloped in the 1960s into the campus of Tallahassee Community College. The airport was at what is now Appleyard Drive and W. Pensacola Street. The north–south runway is clearly visible, and part of it is used for parking.
