= Henderson Field (Guadalcanal) =

WWII military airfield in Guadalcanal

- Part of the Pacific Theater of World War II
- Guadalcanal, Solomon Islands
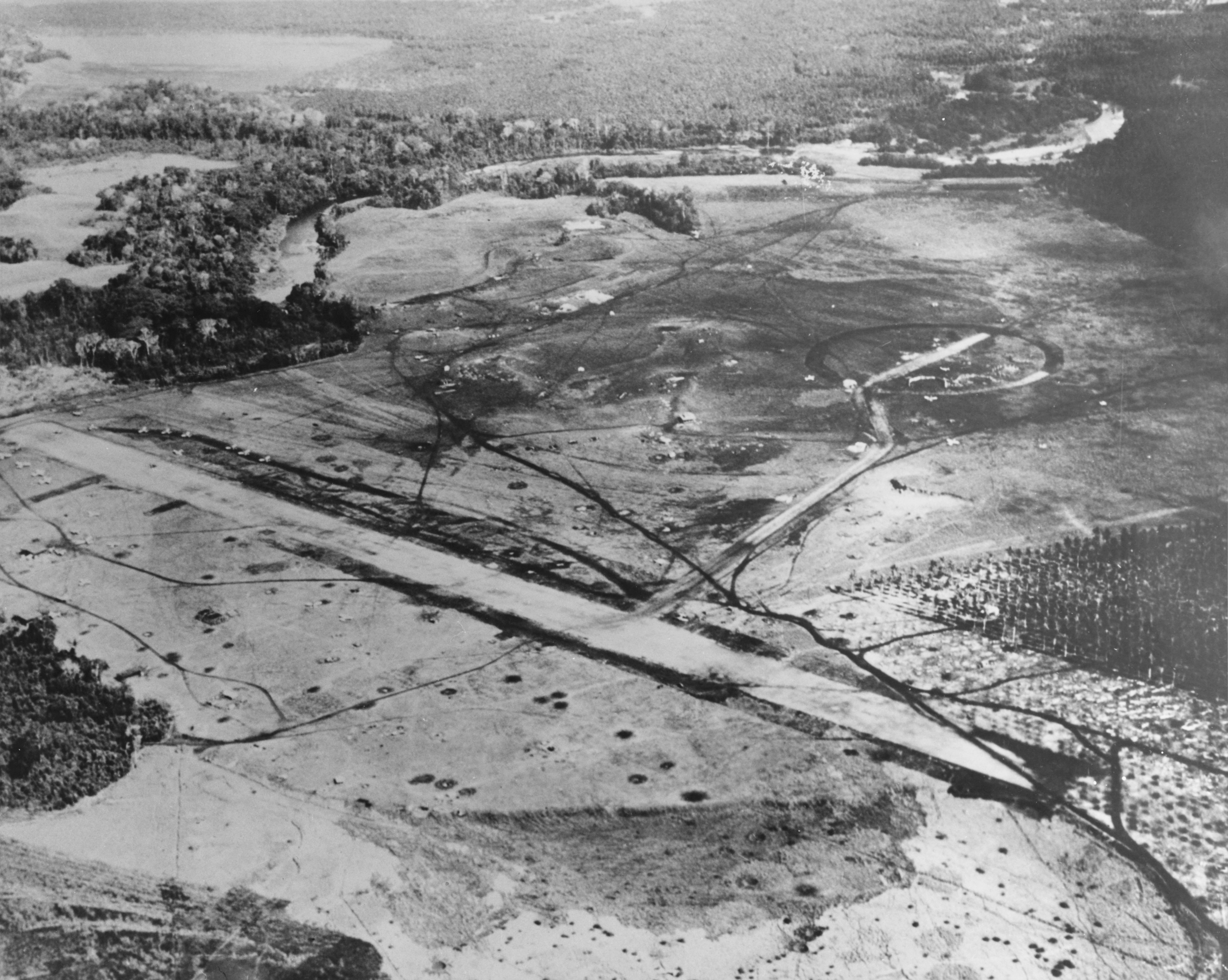
- Henderson Field in late August 1942, shortly after the Allies began operations there

Location
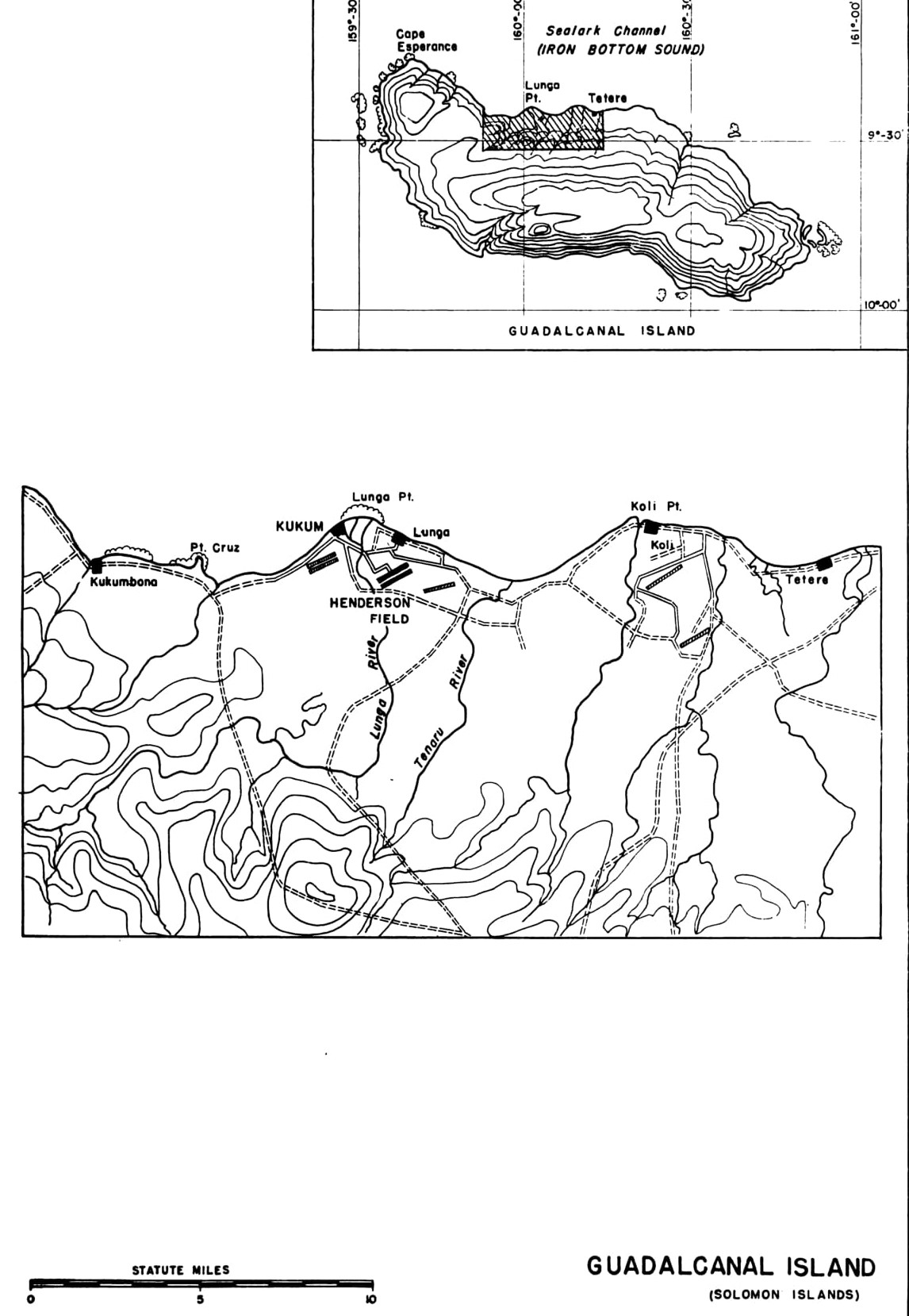
- Location of Henderson Field
- Coordinates: 09°25′41″S 160°03′17″E

Site history
- Built: 1942
- Built by: Japanese Empire (finished by United States)

Location of Henderson Field, Solomon Islands

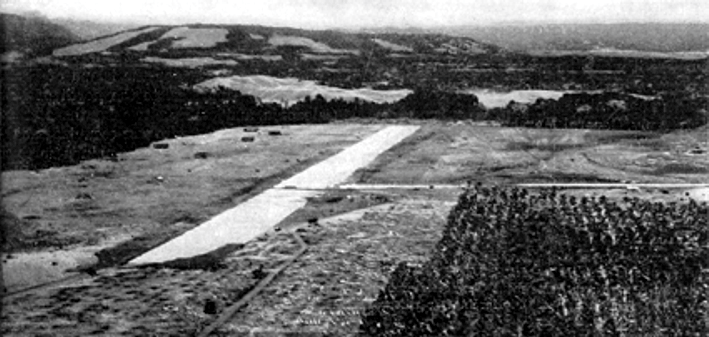
The airfield at Lunga Point on Guadalcanal seen under construction by the Japanese in July, 1942.

Henderson Field is a former military airfield on Guadalcanal, Solomon Islands, during World War II. Originally built by the Japanese Empire, the conflict over its possession was one of the notable battles of the Pacific War. Today it is Honiara International Airport.

== History ==
=== Japanese construction ===
After the occupation of the Solomon Islands in April 1942, the Japanese military planned to capture Port Moresby in New Guinea and Tulagi in the southern Solomons, extending their southern defensive perimeter and establishing bases to support possible future advances. Seizure of Nauru, Ocean Island, New Caledonia, Fiji, and Samoa would cut supply lines between Australia and the United States, reducing or eliminating Australia as a threat to Japanese positions in the South Pacific.

The airfield on Guadalcanal was first surveyed by Japanese engineers when they arrived in the area in early May, and was known as "Lunga Point", or "Runga Point" to the Japanese, and code named "RXI". The airfield would allow Japanese aircraft to patrol the southern Solomons, shipping lanes to Australia, and the eastern flank of New Guinea.

There were two major construction units involved: 1,379 men in one and 1,145 in another, originally designated to work on Midway Island once it was captured. They arrived on 6 July 1942, commencing work after 9 July. Construction was observed by Allied Coastwatchers, prompting American plans to capture Guadalcanal and use the airfield.

About the middle of July, 250 civilians of the "Hama Construction Unit" arrived under the command of Inouree Hama, who had had 50 men on Gavutu previously. Also, specialists from the 14th Encampment Corps established radio stations on Tulagi, Gavutu and at RXI. Local labor was also used.

Airfield construction went well, and on the night of 6 August 1942, just before the American landing, the construction troops were given an extra sake ration for completing the airfield ahead of schedule.

=== United States seizure and Battle of Guadalcanal ===
See: Guadalcanal Campaign and Battle for Henderson Field for more information

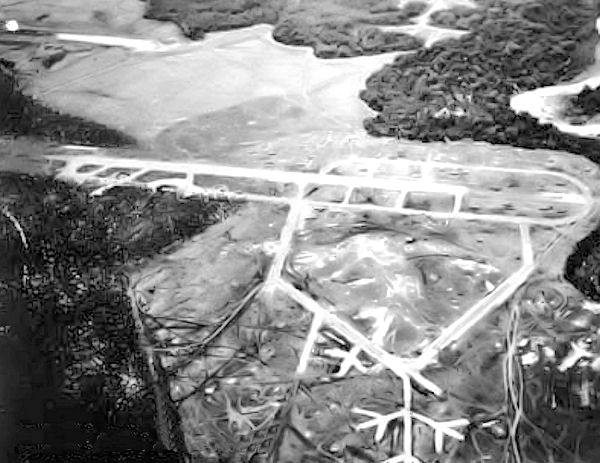
Henderson Field as built up by April 1943, looking southeast to northwest

On 7 August 1942, American forces of the 1st and 2nd Marine Divisions landed on the islands of Guadalcanal, Tulagi, and Florida in the southern Solomon Islands with the objective of preventing their use against supply and communication routes between the U.S., Australia, and New Zealand. The Allies also intended to use Guadalcanal and Tulagi to support a campaign to capture or neutralize the major Japanese base at Rabaul on New Britain.

The Marines overwhelmed the outnumbered defenders and captured Tulagi and essentially unoccupied Florida, as well as the nearly completed RXI airfield on Guadalcanal. The captured airfield was named Henderson Field in honor of United States Marine Corps Major Lofton Henderson, commanding officer of VMSB-241 who was killed in the Battle of Midway while leading his squadron against the Japanese carrier forces; he was the first Marine aviator to perish during that battle.

The first aircraft to land on the field was a PBY patrol bomber on August 12. On August 20, thirty-one Marine aircraft (F4F Wildcat fighters and SBD Dauntless dive bombers) were launched by USS Long Island from south of Guadalcanal, forming the field's first permanent air contingent. Repair and improvement was done by the US Navy Seabee 6th Naval Construction Battalion. Two days later, a squadron of U.S. Army P-400 Airacobra (P-39 variant) fighters arrived, and in the coming months a number of B-17s and U.S. Navy aircraft used the base.

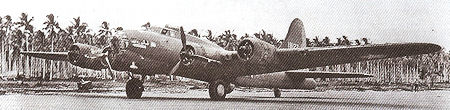
Boeing B-17E of 11th Bomb Group, 42d Bomb Squadron (Eager Beavers) at Henderson Field in 1943

Surprised by the Allied attack, the Japanese made several attempts between August and November 1942 to retake Henderson Field. Three major land battles, seven large naval battles (five nighttime surface actions and two carrier battles), occasional heavy bombardment by naval forces including Kongo-class battleships, and continual, almost daily aerial battles culminated in the decisive Naval Battle of Guadalcanal in early November 1942, during which the last Japanese attempt to bombard Henderson Field from the sea and to land enough troops to retake it was defeated.

Map of Battle for Henderson Field showing Henderfield and Fighter One (labelled as "Fighter Strip") in October 1942

In September, an auxiliary airstrip known as Fighter One was built. Nicknamed "the cow pasture", its runway was only a strip of cut grass, meaning it was only suitable for light fighters. Fighter One served as the main airstrip after the Bombardment of Henderson Field on 13 October. Fighter One suffered from severe drainage problems, and was replaced by a new airstrip designated Fighter Two in December.

In December 1942, the Japanese abandoned their efforts to retake Guadalcanal, conceding the island to the Allies and evacuating their last forces under harassment by the U.S. Army's XIV Corps, by 7 February 1943.

==== List of Naval bombardments ====
Between 10 September and 23 September a large force including carriers Shōkaku, Zuikaku and 4 Kongo class battleships depart Truk to assume station in the Solomon Islands north of Guadalcanal.

Between 11 October and 30 October Zuikaku, Shokaku, Hiei, Kirishima, Kongo and Haruna with their associated support forces depart Truk to assume station in the Solomon Islands. This operation would eventually lead to the Battle of the Santa Cruz Islands.

Date	Bombardment Forces	Result
23 August	destroyer Kagero	
24/25 August	destroyers Kagero, Mutsuki, Kawakaze, Yayoi, Isokaze	
6 September	destroyers Shikinami, Yūdachi, Ariake, Uranami	intended to intercept convoy, bombard the airfield instead
8 September	light cruiser Sendai, 8 destroyers	bombardment of nearby Tulagi
12 September	light cruiser Sendai, destroyers Fubuki, Shikinami, Suzukaze	supports land forces in the Battle of Edson's Ridge
13 September	destroyers Kagero, Uranami, Murakumo, Yūdachi, Ushio, Umikaze, Shirayuki, Kawakaze, Fubuki, Suzukaze, Sazanami	supports land forces in the Battle of Edson's ridge
11/12 October	heavy cruisers Furutaka, Kinugasa, Aoba out of Shortlands	Force is intercepted resulting in the Battle of Cape Esperance
13/14 October	battleships Kongo, Haruna detached from Kondo's Advance Force out of Truk	918 14-inch shells fired on the airfield
14/15 October	heavy cruisers Kinugasa, Chokai out of the Shortlands	752 8-inch shells fired on the airfield
15/16 October	heavy cruisers Maya, Myoko from Kondo's Advance Force	912 8-inch shells fired at the airfield
25 October	light cruiser Yura, destroyers Akizuki, Murasame, Harusame, Yūdachi out of the Shortlands	Yura sunk by airstrikes on approach. mission canceled
12/13 November	battleships Hiei, Kirishima	Force is intercepted resulting in the First Naval Battle of Guadalcanal
13/14 November	heavy cruisers Maya, Suzuya	989 8-inch shells fired on the airfield
14/15 November	battleship Kirishima, heavy cruisers Takao, Atago	Force is intercepted resulting in the Second Naval Battle of Guadalcanal

=== Operations after the Battle of Guadalcanal ===
In 1944, specially-fitted Liberator PB4Y-1 bombers operated from Henderson Field to carry out reconnaissance on Eniwetok and other Japanese-held islands. Royal New Zealand Air Force squadrons were using the air base during October and November 1944 for patrols and searches. The RNZAF provided No 52 Radar Unit in March 1943 with GCI radar, which (unlike the SCR 270 radar) could provide altitudes of approaching enemy planes.

=== Postwar use ===
Henderson Field was abandoned after the war. The field was modernized and reopened in 1969 as Honiara International Airport, the main airport for the Solomon Islands. In the late 1970s the runway was expanded and lengthened.

== United States military use ==
=== United States Navy ===
- VF-5 (F4F) September 1942
- VT-8 (TBF Avenger) September - November 1942
- VC-40 (SBD, TBF)
- VMSB-131 (Avenger) 1943
- VF-26 (F4F) Mar 10 – April 25 & June 26 – Aug 5, 1943
- VF-27 (F4F) Mar 10 – April 25 & June 26 – Aug 5, 1943
- VF-28 (F4F) Mar 10 – April 25 & June 26 – Aug 5, 1943
- CAG 11 (Carrier Air Group 11)
- VF-11 (VB-11) 1943
- VB-21 (SBD) 1943
- VT-11 (TBF Avenger) 1943
- CASU-11 (Carrier Aircraft Service Unit) Feb 1943 – July 1944
- VS-54 (SBD, OS2U) June 11, 1943 – August 3, 1944

=== United States Marine Corps ===
- 3d Defense Battalion (AAA) August 7, 1942 - February 19, 1943
- VMF-223 (F4F) August 20 - October 16, 1942
- VMTB-132 (SBD) Oct 30 – Dec 24, 1942
- VMTB-233 (SBD / TBF) August 1943 – October 29, 1943
- VMF-121 (F4F) October 1942
- VMF-123 (F4F) February 3 - Aug 1943
- VMF-112 "Wolf Pack" (F4U) May 1943 – July 28, 1943 – 3rd tour
- VMF-122 (F4U) June 1943 – July 23, 1943 – 1st MAW
- VMF-124 (F4U) April 4, 1943 – September 1943
- VMSB-132 (SBD) June 23, 1943 – Aug 2, 1943 – 3rd tour
- VMSB-143 (TBF) November 12, 1942 – ? Munda
- VMSB-144 (SBD-3) June 13, 1943 – June 26, 1943 then to Russells
- VMSB-236 (SBD) Espiritu Santo Nov 43 – Nov 25, 1943 to Munda
- MABS-1 (Marine Air Base Squad-1) Feb 1, 1943 – Nov 43 to Ondonga

=== United States Army Air Forces ===
- 44th FS
- 38th BG, 70th BS (B-26) Fiji January – Feb 4, 1943 Fiji
- 42nd BG, 69th BS (B-26, B-25) New Hebrides January – Oct 43 PDG
- 42nd BG, 75th BS (B-25) ? – Oct 21, 1943 Renard
- 38th BG, 70th BS (B-25) Fiji ? – Oct 22, 43 Russells
- 347th FG, 67th FS (P-39) New Caledonia Aug 22, 42 – June 43
- 42nd BG, 390th BS (B-25) Fiji May 11 – Oct 22, 1943 Renard

== See also ==
- Carney Airfield
- Koli Airfield
- Kukum Field
