= Ushio =

Ushio may refer to:

- Japanese destroyer Ushio, two IJN ships
- Ushio Okazaki (岡崎 汐), a fictional character from Clannad
- Ushio (magazine) (潮), a Japanese magazine which has a strong connection with Soka Gakkai
- Ushio Shuppansha (潮出版社), the Japanese publisher
- Ushio Inc., partner of Jenoptik AG in an Intel funding for an EUV-Lithography joint-venture
- Ushio, Inc. (ウシオ電機), a publicly traded Japanese company with its headquarters in Tokyo
- Ushio and Tora, a 1990 Japanese manga
- Ushio Shimabara, one of main characters of Neo Ranga
- Ushio Kofune, a fictional character from Summer Time Rendering

== People with the surname ==
- Keizo Ushio, a Japanese sculptor
- Kensuke Ushio (牛尾 憲輔, born 1983), Japanese composer and musician
- Sayuri Ushio (牛尾 早百合, born 1960), Japanese hairdresser, businesswoman and photographer
