= United States Army Air Forces in the South Pacific Area =

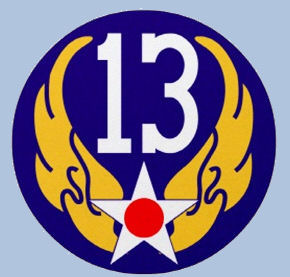
Airfields of the United States Army Air Force in the South Pacific Area
- Part of World War II
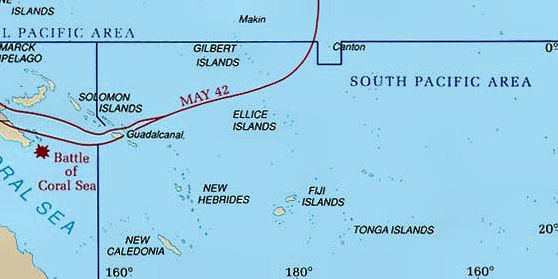
Date	1942-1945
Location	South Pacific Area, part of Pacific Ocean Areas
Result	Allied victory over the Empire of Japan (1945)

During World War II, the United States Army Air Forces engaged in combat against the Empire of Japan in the South Pacific Area. As defined by the War Department, this consisted of the Pacific Ocean areas which lay south of the Equator between longitude 159° East and 110° West. It included New Zealand, New Caledonia, New Hebrides, Fiji, and most of the Solomon Islands.

In early 1942, the area was under the Seventh Air Force. By November, the Thirteenth Air Force, was formed to command and control AAF organizations in the southern areas of the widely separated Seventh Air Force and independent units scattered in the South Pacific Area during the Solomon Islands campaign. As the war progressed, Thirteenth Air Force units moved into the South West Pacific theatre and coordinated their activities with Fifth as part of the Far East Air Forces, a new formation.

== Airfields and unit assignments ==
COOK ISLANDS

- Amuri Field, Aitutaki Island, Cook Islands

18°49′51″S 159°45′51″W

- Robinson (Omoka) Field, Penrhyn Island, Cook Islands

09°01′00″S 158°01′51″W

ELLICE ISLANDS

- Funafuti Airfield, Funafuti Atoll, Ellice Islands

08°31′29.50″S 179°11′46.31″E
Seventh Air Force
Headquarters, VII Bomber Command, November 1943 – January 1944
11th Bombardment Group (Heavy), 2 November 1943 – 13 January 1944

42d Bombardment Squadron (Heavy), 9 November 1943 – 8 January 1944
431st Bombardment Squadron (Heavy), 11 November 1943 – 15 January 1944

- Nanumea Airfield, Nanumea Atoll, Ellice Islands

05°41′00″S 176°07′44.4″E
30th Bombardment Group, Heavy, 12 November 1943 – 3 January 1944

27th Bombardment Squadron, Heavy, 10 November 1943 – 14 March 1944 (operated from Abemama, Gilbert Islands 26 February-14 March 1944)
38th Bombardment Squadron, Heavy, 12 November 1943 – 12 March 1944 (operated from Makin Atoll, Gilbert Islands 26 February-22 March 1944)

- Nukufetau Airfield, Nukufetau Atoll, Ellice Islands

08°04′04″S 178°22′35″E
Seventh Air FOrce
26th Bombardment Squadron (Heavy), 11th Bombardment Group (Heavy), 11 November 1943 – 24 January 1944 (air echelon operated from Canton Island 12 November-31 December 1943)
98th Bombardment Squadron (Heavy), 11th Bombardment Group (Heavy), 11 November 1943 – 19 January 1944

FIJI ISLANDS

- Nandi Airfield, Viti Levu Island, Fiji Islands

17°45′19″S 177°26′36″E
Seventh Air Force
42d Bombardment Group, 22 April – 6 June 1943
394th Bombardment Squadron (Heavy), 5th Bombardment Group (Heavy), 25 December 1942 – 3 January 1943
Thirteenth Air Force
394th Bombardment Squadron (Heavy), 5th Bombardment Group (Heavy), 4 January 1943 – 27 June 1943 (operated from Espiritu Santo and Guadalcanal 3–19 January 1943 and 25 April-5 June 1943)
431st Bombardment Squadron (Heavy), 11th Bombardment Group (Heavy), 24 July-31 October 1942 (air echelon operated from New Hebrides, August 1942)

- Nausori Airfield, Viti Levu Island, Fiji Islands

18°02′36″S 178°33′33″E

NEW CALEDONIA

- Magenta Airfield, New Caledonia Island, New Caledonia

22°15′30″S 166°28′22″E

- Plaine Des Gaiacs Airfield, New Caledonia Island, New Caledonia

21°15′59.1″S 164°54′42.1″E
Thirteenth Air Force
Headquarters, Thirteenth Air Force, 13–21 January 1943
Headquarters, XIII Fighter Command, 13–22 January 1943
4th Photographic Group, 22 November 1942-May 1943
4th Photographic Reconnaissance and Mapping Group, May–November 1943
4th Photographic Group (Reconnaissance), November 1943-5 May 1944
42d Bombardment Group, 20 October 1943 – 20 January 1944
347th Fighter Group, 3 October – 29 December 1943
42d Bombardment Squadron (Heavy), 11th Bombardment Group (Heavy), 22 July-22 November 1942

- Tontouta Airfield, New Caledonia Island, New Caledonia

22°00′59″S 166°12′58″E

NEW HEBRIDES ISLANDS

- Pekoa Airfield (Bomber #2), Espiritu Santo Island, New Hebrides Islands

15°30′18.12″S 167°13′11.07″E
Seventh Air Force
5th Bombardment Group (Heavy), 1 December 1942 – 3 January 1943

23d Bombardment Squadron (Heavy), 1 December 1942 – 3 January 1943
31st Bombardment Squadron (Heavy), 30 November 1942 – 3 January 1943
72d Bombardment Squadron (Heavy), 24 September 1942 – 3 January 1943 (operated from Guadalcanal 4 October 1942 – 3 January 1943)
394th Bombardment Squadron (Heavy) (operated from Espiritu Santo and Guadalcanal 3–19 January 1943 and 25 April-5 June 1943)

11th Bombardment Group (Heavy), 22 July 1942 – 4 January 1943

26th Bombardment Squadron (Heavy), 22 December 1942 – 4 January 1943
42d Bombardment Squadron (Heavy), 23 November 1942 – 4 January 1943 (forward echelon operated from Guadalcanal)
98th Bombardment Squadron (Heavy), 11 August 1942 – 4 January 1943 (operated from New Caledonia 21 July-11 August 1942)
431st Bombardment Squadron (Heavy), 1 November 1942 – 4 January 1943 (forward echelon operated from Guadalcanal, December 1942)

Thirteenth Air Force
Headquarters, XIII Bomber Command, 13 January – 20 August 1943
Headquarters, XIII Fighter Command, 22 January–December 1943
5th Bombardment Group (Heavy), 4 January–18 August 1943

23d Bombardment Squadron (Heavy), 4 January 1943 – 3 January 1944 (operated from Guadalcanal 31 March-24 August 1943 and 21 October-7 December 1943)
31st Bombardment Squadron (Heavy), 4–17 January 1943
72d Bombardment Squadron (Heavy), 4 January 1943 – 8 January 1944 (operated from Guadalcanal 4 January-8 August 1943, 7 October-15 November 1943 and 13 December 1943 – 27 January 1944)

11th Bombardment Group (Heavy), 5 January-7 April 1943

26th Bombardment Squadron (Heavy), 5 January-28 March 1943 (forward echelon operated from New Guinea January 1943)
42d Bombardment Squadron (Heavy), 5 January-7 April 1943
98th Bombardment Squadron (Heavy), 5 January-7 April 1943
431st Bombardment Squadron (Heavy), 15 January-7 April 1943

18th Fighter Group, 11 March – 17 April 1943
4th Reconnaissance Group, 23 January 1943 – 6 May 1944
403d Troop Carrier Group, 13 September 1943 – 30 August 1944

- Palikulo Bay Airfield (Bomber #1), Espiritu Santo, New Hebrides Islands

15°30′06″S 167°14′45″E

- Luganville Airfield (Bomber #3), Espiritu Santo Island, New Hebrides Islands

15°30′17″S 167°07′12″E

- Turtle Bay Airfield (Fighter #1), Espiritu Santo Island, New Hebrides Islands

15°22′41″S 167°10′45″E

- Efate Airfield, Efate Island, New Hebrides Islands

17°41′58″S 168°19′12″E
Seventh Air Force
26th Bombardment Squadron (Heavy), 11th Bombardment Group (Heavy), 25 July-21 December 1942 (forward echelon operated from Espiritu Santo, August 1942, and Guadalcanal, September 1942)

NEW ZEALAND

- Whenuapai Airport, Auckland, New Zealand

36°47′16″S 174°37′49″E

NORFOLK ISLAND

- Norfolk Airport, Norfolk Island, Australia

29°02′30″S 167°56′19″E

SOCIETY ISLANDS

- Bora Bora Airfield, Motu Mute Island, Society Islands

16°26′46″S 151°45′16″W

SOLOMON ISLANDS

Bougainville Island

- Piva Uncle (North) Field, Bougainville Island, Solomon Islands

06°13′S 155°04′E

- Piva Yoke (South) Field, Bougainville Island, Solomon Islands

06°13′S 155°04′E

Buka Island

- Buka Airfield, Buka Island, Solomon Islands

05°25′20.34″S 154°40′21.60″E
419th Night Fighter Squadron (DET), 25 January – 27 May 1944

Guadalcanal Island

- Carney Airfield, Guadalcanal Island, Solomon Islands

09°26′07.51″S 160°09′34.48″E
Headquarters, Thirteenth Air Force, 21 January – 15 June 1944
Headquarters, XIII Bomber Command, 20 August 1943 – June 1944
Headquarters, XIII Fighter Command, December 1943-15 August 1944
18th Fighter Group, 17 April 1943 – 23 August 1944
347th Fighter Group, 29 December 1943 – 15 January 1944
4th Reconnaissance Group, 6 May – 12 December 1944
419th Night Fighter Squadron, 15 November 1943 – 21 August 1944

- Henderson Field, Guadalcanal Island, Solomon Islands

09°25′40.8″S 160°03′17.24″E
Thirteenth Air Force
5th Bombardment Group (Heavy), 19 August 1943 – 4 February 1944

31st Bombardment Squadron (Heavy), 17 January 1943 – 19 April 1944 (operated from Munda, 2 February-13 March 1944)
72d Bombardment Squadron (Heavy) (operated from Guadalcanal 4 January-8 August 1943, 7 October-15 November 1943 and 13 December 1943 – 27 January 1944)
394th Bombardment Squadron (Heavy), 28 June 1943 – 12 April 1944 (operated from Espiritu Santo and Guadalcanal 3–19 January 1943 and 25 April-5 June 1943 and from Munda 28 February-9 April 1944)

- Koli Airfield, Guadalcanal Island, Solomon Islands

09°27′28.94″S 160°10′41.50″E
Thirteenth Air Force
42d Bombardment Group, 6 June – 20 October 1943
307th Bombardment Group, February 1943-28 January 1944

- Kukum Field, Guadalcanal Island, Solomon Islands

09°25′34″S 160°00′39″E

New Georgia Islands

- Munda Airfield, New Georgia Islands, Solomon Islands

08°19′40.69″S 157°15′47.13″E
Thirteenth Air Force
5th Bombardment Group, Heavy, 4 February–6 April 1944

31st Bombardment Squadron (Heavy), (operated from here 2 February-13 March 1944)
72d Bombardment Squadron (Heavy), 9 January-14 April 1944 (operated from Guadalcanal (13 December 1943 – 27 January 1944)
394th Bombardment Squadron (Heavy) (operated from Guadalcanal 28 February-9 April 1944)

307th Bombardment Group, 28 January – 29 April 1944

Russell Islands

- Renard Field, Banika Island, Russell Islands, Solomon Islands

09°05′34″S 159°13′08″E

- Sunlight Field, Banika Island, Russell Islands, Solomon Islands

09°03′53″S 159°12′51″E

TONGA ISLANDS

- Tongatubu Airfield, Tongatubu Island

21°14′28″S 175°08′58″W
Seventh Air Force
68th Fighter Squadron, 58th Fighter Group, 16 May - 28 October 1942

== See also ==
- United States Army Air Forces in the Pacific War (1941–1945)
  - USAAF in Australia
  - USAAF in the Central Pacific
  - USAAF in the Southwest Pacific
  - USAAF in Okinawa
- South Pacific air ferry route in World War II
