= Sayuri =

Sayuri may refer to:

- Sayuri (given name)
- Sayuri (musician) (1996–2024), Japanese musician
- Yakob Sayuri (born 1997), Indonesian footballer
- Yance Sayuri (born 1997), Indonesian footballer, twin brother of Yakob.
