= XIII Bomber Command =

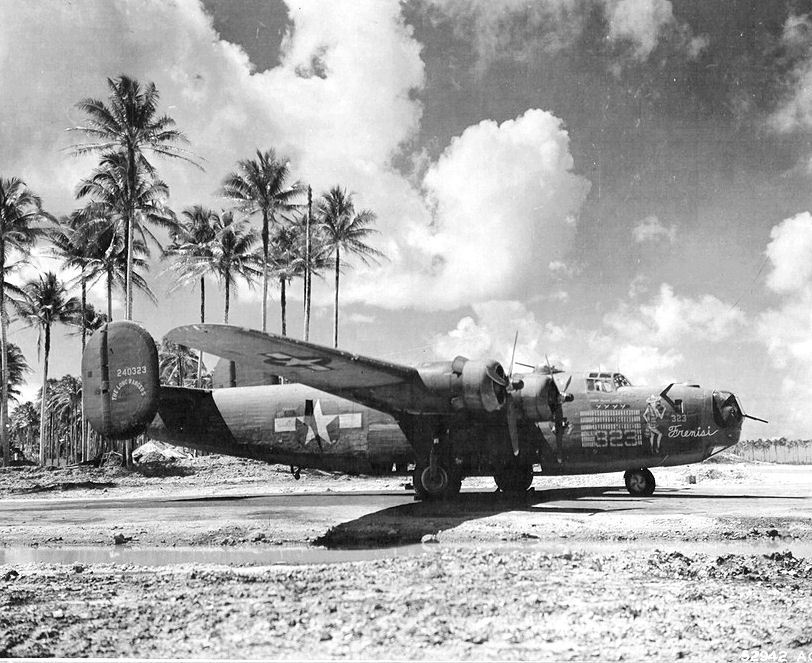
- Command B-24 Liberator in 1944 (Note: Aircraft is Consolidated B-24D-50-CO Liberator, serial 42-40323 of the 424th Bombardment Squadron.)
- Active: 1943–1946
- Country: United States
- Branch: United States Army Air Forces
- Role: Command of bomber units
- Engagements: Southwest Pacific Theater; China-Burma-India Theater; Central Pacific Theater

The XIII Bomber Command was an inactive United States Army Air Forces formation. It was last assigned to Thirteenth Air Force, based at Clark Field, Luzon, Philippines. It was inactivated on 15 March 1946.

== History ==
XIII Bomber Command was a World War II command and control organization for Thirteenth Air Force. Its mission was to provide command and control authority of Army Air Force bombardment organizations within the Thirteenth Air Force Area of Responsibility.

Participated in the following campaigns: Central Pacific; China Defensive; Guadalcanal; New Guinea; Northern Solomons; Eastern Mandates; Bismarck Archipelago; Western Pacific; Leyte; Luzon; Southern Philippines; China Offensive.

== Lineage ==
- Constituted as the XIII Bomber Command on 14 December 1942

Activated on 13 January 1943
Inactivated on 15 March 1946
Disbanded on 8 October 1948

=== Assignments ===
- Thirteenth Air Force, 13 January 1943 – 15 March 1946

=== Stations ===
- Pekoa Airfield, Espiritu Santo, New Hebrides, 13 January 1943
- Carney Airfield, Guadalcanal, Solomon Islands, 20 August 1943
- Momote Airfield, Los Negros Island, Admiralty Islands, June 1944
- Wakde Airfield, Wakde, Netherlands East Indies. 3 September 1944
- Wama Airfield, Morotai, Netherlands East Indies. 17 October 1944
- Clark Field, Luzon, Philippines, 27 August 1945 – 15 March 1946

=== Components ===
Groups

- 5th Bombardment Group, 13 January 1943 – 15 December 1945
- 11th Bombardment Group, 9 November 1943 – 15 March 1946
- 42d Bombardment Group, 22 April 1943 – 25 December 1945 (attached to 308th Bombardment Wing, c. 24 August 1944; 310th Bombardment Wing, 3 September 1944; Thirteenth Air Task Force, c. 15 September 1944; XIII Fighter Command, 1 October 1944; XIII Bomber Command Rear Echelon, 9 January – 24 February 1945; XIII Fighter Command, c. 22 March – c. September 1945)
- 307th Bombardment Group, February 1943 – December 1945
- 494th Bombardment Group: under operational control 20–27 March 1945)

Squadrons

- 5th Tactical Air Communications Squadron: 20 October – 28 November 1945
- 9th Tactical Air Communications Squadron: 20 October – 28 November 1945
- 14th Tow Target Squadron: c. November – 27 December 1945
- 342d Fighter Squadron: attached c. 25 August – 22 September 1944
- 550th Night Fighter Squadron: attached 14 February – 7 April 1945

== See also ==
- United States Army Air Forces in the South Pacific Area
