= 35th Reconnaissance Squadron =

35th Reconnaissance Squadron may refer to:

- The 424th Bombardment Squadron, designated the 35th Reconnaissance Squadron (Heavy) in April 1942.
- The 35th Reconnaissance Squadron (Fighter), active from April 1943 to September 1943, but apparently never fully manned or equipped.

== See also ==
- The 35th Photographic Reconnaissance Squadron
