= Sayuri (given name) =

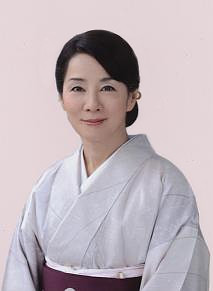
- Sayuri Yoshinaga. Japanese actress.
- Pronunciation: sajɯɾi (IPA)
- Gender: Female

Origin
- Word/name: Japanese
- Meaning: Usually "small lily" is the most commonly used Kanji.
- Region of origin: Japan

Sayuri is a common feminine Japanese given name.

== Written forms ==
Sayuri can be written using different kanji characters and can mean:

- 小百合, "small, lily"
- 早百合, "early, lily"
- 佐由里, "assistant, reason, home town"
- 小百里, "small, hundred, home town"

The name can also be written in hiragana さゆり or katakana サユリ.

== Notable people with the name ==
- Sayuri (musician) (さユり; 1996–2024), Japanese singer
- Sayuri Date (伊達 さゆり; born 2002), Japanese Japanese voice actress
- Sayuri Fujita (藤田 小百合; born 1979), Japanese television personality in South Korea
- Sayuri Hara (原 紗友里; born 1988), Japanese voice actress
- Sayuri Honda (本田 小百合; born 1978), Japanese shogi player
- Sayuri Hori (保里 小百合; born 1990), Japanese announcer
- Sayuri Horishita (堀下 さゆり; born 1980), Japanese singer
- Sayuri Ichiishi (一石 小百合; born 1964), Japanese character designer for the Pokémon anime series
- Sayuri Inoue (井上 小百合; born 1994), Japanese singer
- Sayuri Ishikawa (石川 さゆり; born 1958), Japanese enka singer
- Sayuri Iwata (岩田 さゆり; born 1990), Japanese singer
- Sayuri Katayama (片山 さゆり; born 1979), Japanese actress, singer and lyricist
- Sayuri Kokushō (国生 さゆり; born 1966), Japanese actress and singer
- Sayuri Kume (久米小 百合; born 1958), Japanese singer-songwriter
- Sayuri Maruyama (丸山 さゆり; born 1975), Japanese sprint canoer
- Sayuri Matsumura (松村 沙友理; born 1992), Japanese singer
- Sayuri Ogawa (小川 さゆり; born 1996), Japanese activist
- Sayuri Osuga (大菅 小百合; born 1980), Japanese speed skater and cyclist
- Sayuri Oyamada (小山田 サユリ; born 1975), Japanese actress
- Sayuri Sadaoka (定岡 小百合; born 1955), Japanese voice actress
- Sayuri Shimizu (清水 小百合; born 1989), Japanese speed skater
- Sayuri Sugawara (菅原 紗由理; born 1990), Japanese singer, also known by the name THE SxPLAY
- Sayuri Sugimoto (杉本 早裕吏; born 1996), Japanese rhythmic gymnast
- Sayuri Sugawara (菅原 紗由理; born 1990), Japanese singer
- Sayuri Takebe (竹部 さゆり; born 1978), Japanese shogi player
- Sayuri Takeda (竹田 小百合; born 1989), Japanese retired triple jumper
- Sayuri Uchida (内田 さゆり; born 1972), Japanese actress
- Sayuri Ueda (上田 早夕里; born 1964), Japanese science fiction and fantasy writer
- Sayuri Uenishi (上西 小百合; born 1983), Japanese politician and tarento
- Sayuri Ushio (牛尾 早百合; born 1960), Japanese hairdresser, businesswoman and photographer
- Sayuri Yahagi (矢作 紗友里; born 1986), Japanese voice actress
- Sayuri Yamaguchi (山口 小百合; born 1966), Japanese women's footballer
- Sayuri Yamauchi (山内 小百合; 1958–2012), Japanese voice actress
- Sayuri Yoshida (吉田 小百合; born 1966), Japanese voice actress
- Sayuri Yoshii (吉井 小百合; born 1984), Japanese speed skater
- Sayuri Yoshinaga (吉永 小百合; born 1945), Japanese actress
- Sayuri Yōko (葉子 小百合; 1901–1986), Japanese theatre company president and actress.

== Fictional characters ==
- Sayuri Kinniku (キン肉 小百合), from the manga and anime series Kinnikuman
- Sayuri Kurata (倉田 佐祐理), from the visual novel and media franchise Kanon
- Sayuri Nitta (born Chiyo Sakamoto), from the 1997 novel and 2005 film Memoirs of a Geisha
- Sayuri Sawatari (沢渡 さゆり), from the 2004 film The Place Promised in Our Early Days
- Sayuri Suizenji (水前寺 小百合), from the mecha anime series Machine Robo Rescue
- Sayuri Tachibana, a character from Ultraman X
- Sayuri, from the video game Gemini Rue
- Sayuri Kakinuma (柿沼 小百合), supporting character in the novel Another
- Sayuri Hanayori (花依 小百合), supporting character in the manga and anime series Seraph of the End
- Sayuri, from the video game Dead or Alive Xtreme Venus Vacation
