= 90th Expeditionary Air Refueling Squadron =

US Air Force unit

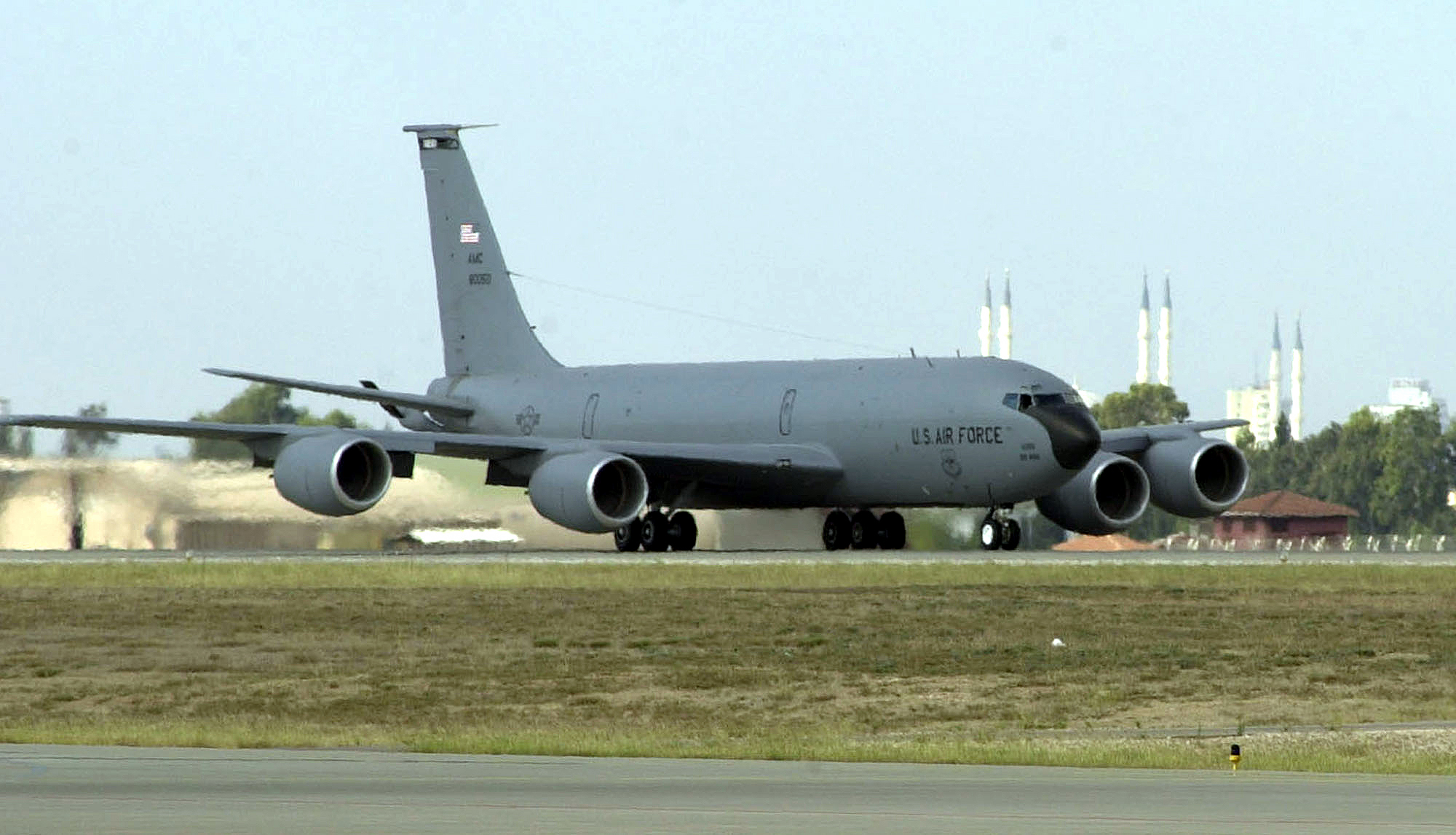
- A squadron KC-135R Stratotanker taxis at Incirlik Air Base, Turkey
- Active: 1942–1946; 1954–1962; 2002–unknown
- Country: United States
- Branch: United States Air Force
- Role: Aerial refueling
- Decorations: Distinguished Unit Citation; Philippine Republic Presidential Unit Citation

Insignia
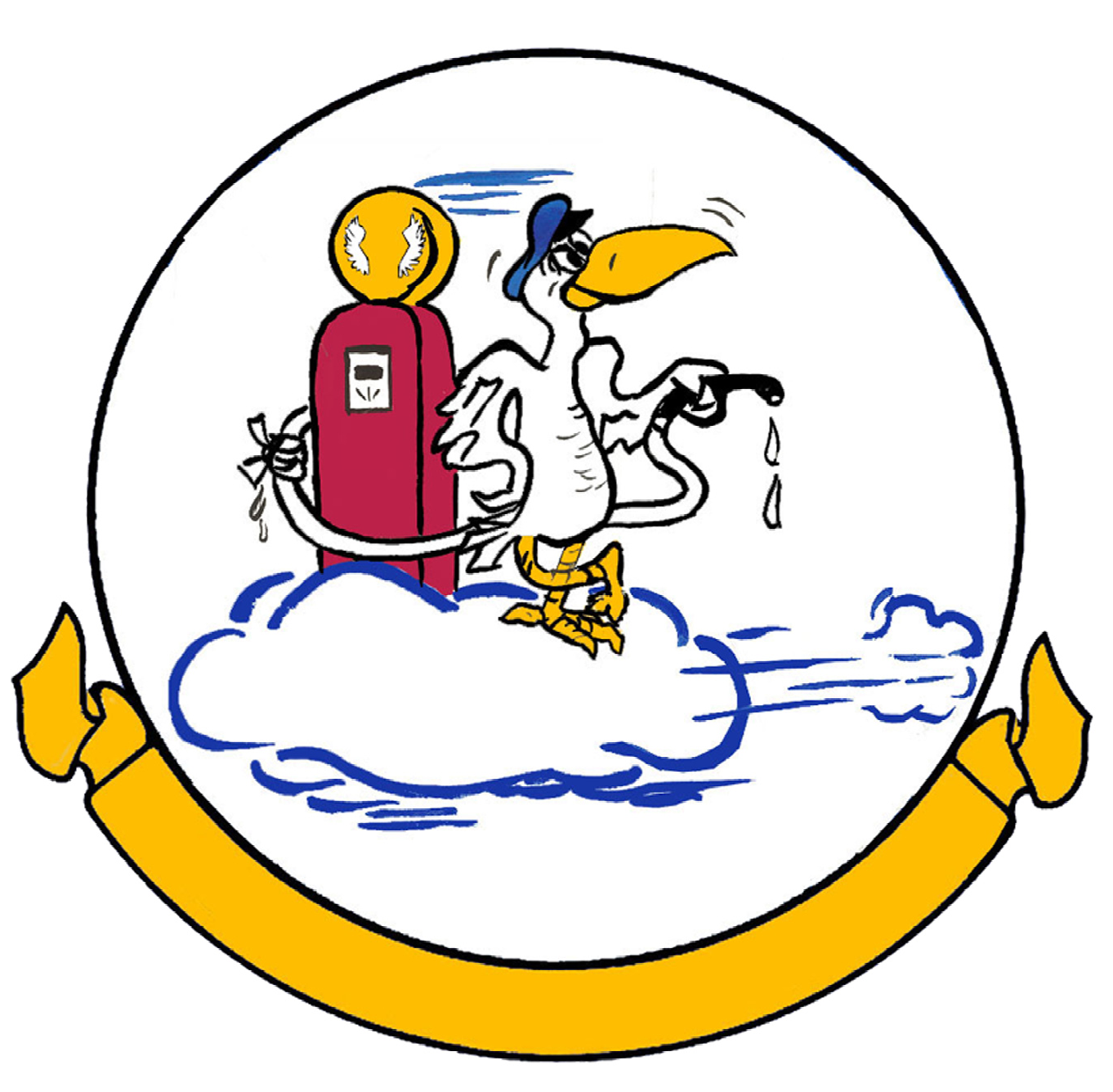
- 90th Air Refueling Squadron emblem

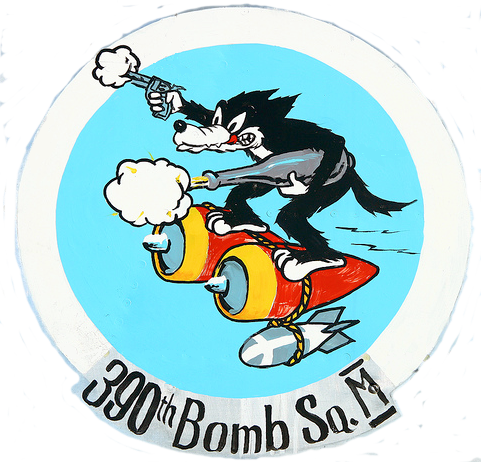
- 390th Bombardment Refueling Squadron emblem (approved 8 March 1945)

The 90th Expeditionary Air Refueling Squadron is a provisional United States Air Force unit. Until March 2013, it was assigned to the 385th Air Expeditionary Group at Incirlik Air Base, Turkey. It then departed for an undisclosed location in Southwest Asia.

The squadron was first activated during World War II as the 390th Bombardment Squadron, a medium bomber unit. Once crewed and equipped, it conducted antisubmarine patrols off the Pacific coast. In 1943 it moved to the Southwest Pacific Theater as part of Thirteenth Air Force. The 390th saw combat in the Solomon Islands, Russell Islands, New Guinea and the Philippines. The squadron was awarded a Distinguished Unit Citation for its pre-invasion bombing of Balikpapan from 23 to 30 June 1945. Its missions during the campaign in the Philippines also earned it a Philippine Presidential Unit Citation. The 390th was inactivated in the Philippines in early 1946.

The 90th Air Refueling Squadron was activated at Castle Air Force Base, California in 1954 with Boeing KC-97 Stratofreighters, replacing the 340th Air Refueling Squadron. The unit served as a refueling element of the 93d Bombardment Wing until 1955, when it moved to Forbes Air Force Base, Kansas to support the 90th Strategic Reconnaissance Wing. Both wings flew the Boeing B-47 Stratojet. The squadron frequently deployed to support bombers under Operation Reflex until it was inactivated in 1962 as Strategic Air Command converted its refueling force to Boeing KC-135 Stratotankers.

The two squadrons were consolidated into a single unit, the 90th Air Refueling Squadron in 1985. In 2002 the consolidated unit was converted to provisional status as the 90th Expeditionary Air Refueling Squadron. It was activated at Incirlik Air Base, Turkey later that year and has provided aerial refueling to U.S. forces fighting in the Middle East since then.

== History ==
=== World War II ===
==== Training and antisubmarine warfare in the United States ====
The squadron was first activated as the 390th Bombardment Squadron at Gowen Field, Idaho on 20 March 1942, but immediately moved to McChord Field, Washington, where it replaced the 77th Bombardment Squadron of the 42d Bombardment Group, which had deployed to Alaska following the Japanese attack on Pearl Harbor and was attached to another group. When it joined the 42d, the group was dispersed on several bases in the Pacific Northwest to provide greater coverage for antisubmarine patrols with detachments at smaller fields. The group primarily used Lockheed A-29 Hudsons for its antisubmarine work, but also flew several other types. Most of the initial personnel of the 390th were drawn from the group's headquarters squadron at McChord.

While antisubmarine patrols continued, the squadron trained North American B-25 Mitchell combat crews for the Alaskan Defense Command. It also tested incendiary bombs and bombing techniques at the ranges of Las Vegas Army Air Field. In February 1943 the squadron was alerted for overseas movement. Aircrews trained with B-25s at Hammer Field and McClellan Field in California before the air echelon departed for its new assignment on 6 March. The ground echelon assembled at Camp Stoneman for overseas shipment aboard the SS Catalina and the USAT Maui, departing for Noumea on 27 and 28 March.

==== Combat in the Pacific ====
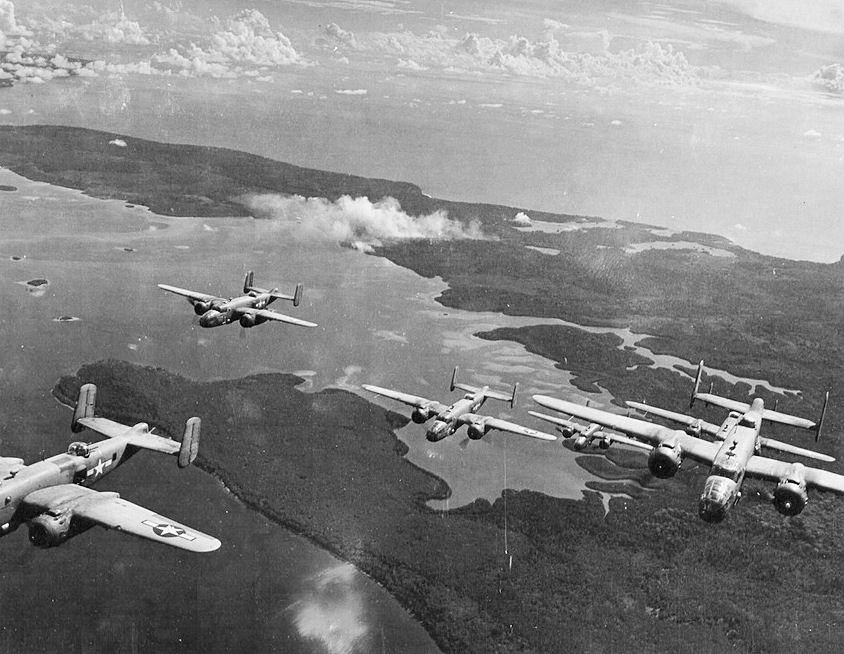
42 Bombardment Group B-25 Mitchells over Bougainville

Solomon and Russell Islands

The air echelon arrived at Nandi Airfield in late April 1943, where it joined its 69th and 70th Bombardment Squadrons, which were already there. After additional training, the air echelon moved to Carney Field, Guadalcanal in June and joined the ground echelon which had arrived the previous month. It launched its first attack on 25 June, when it struck the support areas of Vila Airfield, on Kolombangara.

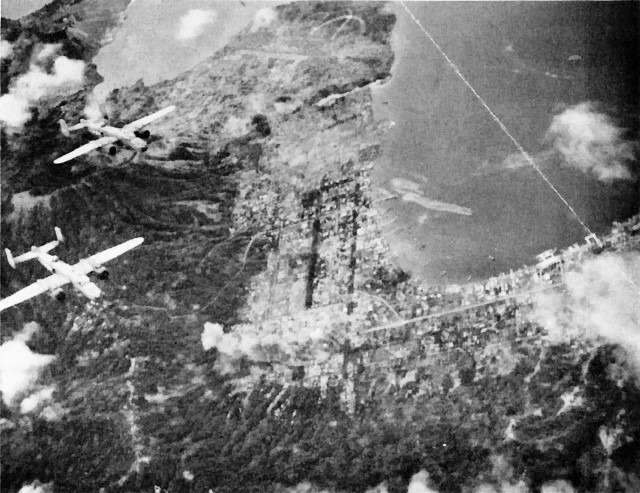
Rabaul under air attack by B-25s of ComAirSols

The 390th attacked Japanese airfields, personnel areas, gun positions, and shipping. Shipping attacks relied on what were referred to as "snooper" missions, armed reconnaissance sorties, flown at night, searching for Japanese shipping to attack. On 20 July, squadron participated in a successful attack on Japanese combatant ships "Mitchells of the 69th Squadron . . . on all night shipping alert [had left a Japanese] light cruiser burning and dead in the water . . . At 0720 eight Mitchells of the 390th Squadron found the cruiser damaged in the previous night's action creeping to friendly waters at a speed of 2 knots. Although sorely wounded, her defense was still vicious, pouring anti-aircraft fire from at least 30 stations. Feints at various quarters divided the fire and allowed individual planes to launch masthead attacks. Lieut. Schauffler ended the fray when one of his bombs exploded in the ship's magazine. Two minutes later she slipped into the depths, carrying with her at least 75% of her crew."

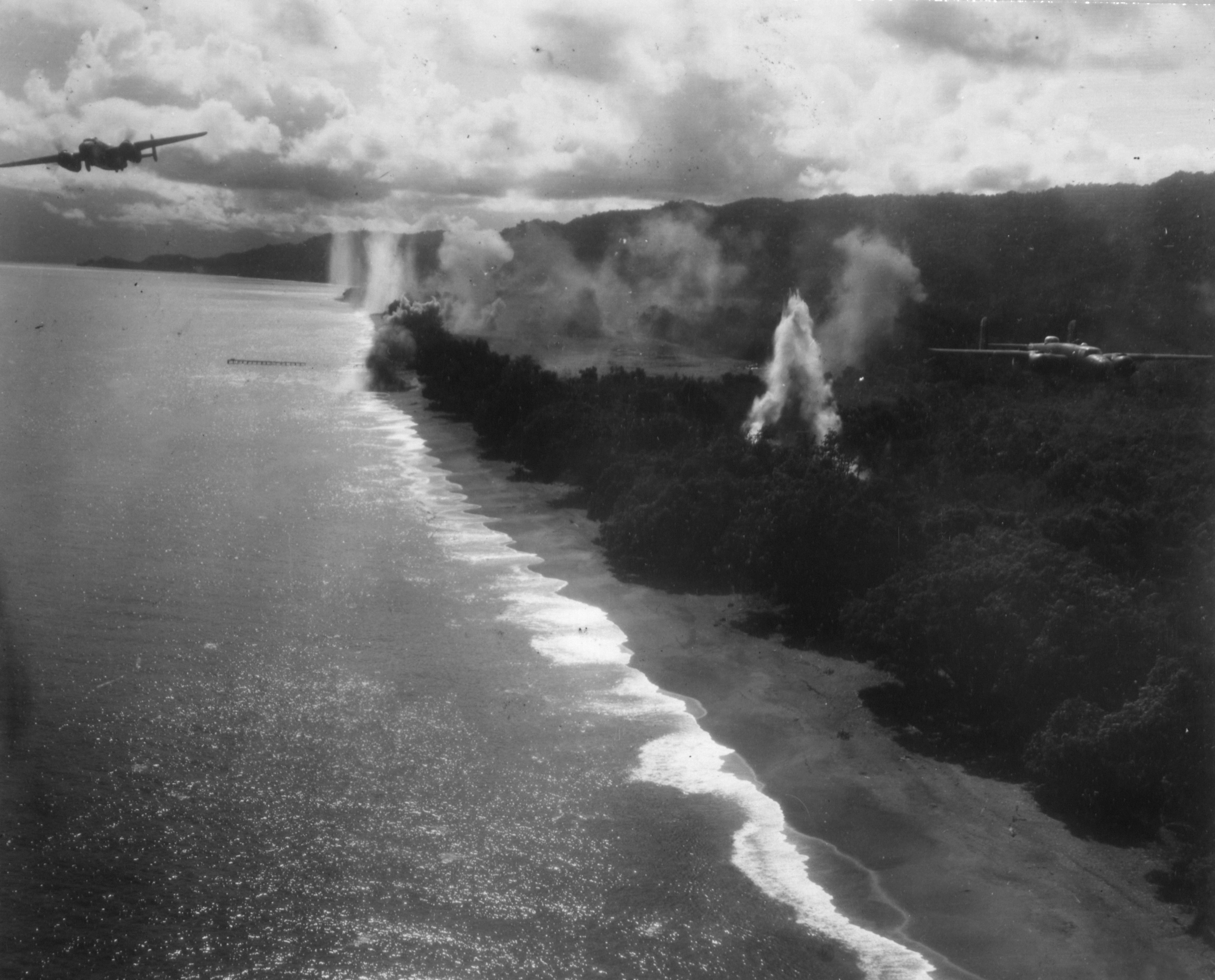
B-25s bomb Wewak area

During most of this period, the 42d group could maintain only two squadrons in the Solomons at a time, and at the end of July 1943, the 70th and 75th squadrons moved forward, while the 390th and the 69th Bombardment Squadron moved to rear areas to refit. After returning to the Solomons, the squadron participated in a group attack on 6 October against the Japanese field at Kahili. Because of the critical need to avoid detection, this involved flying over 300 miles at minimum altitude over a route designed to avoid islands along the way from which the group's Mitchells could be spotted. The successful strafing and parafrag attack shut down all enemy air forces in the area for the next two days, enabling the Navy to withdraw two crippled destroyers and rescue operations and cargo ships to offload troops and supplies at Barakoma airfield without air opposition.

On 22 October the squadron made a short move to Renard Field in the Russell Islands along with group headquarters and the 75th Bombardment Squadron. The 42d group began using the new airfield on Stirling Island as a staging point for strikes in early January and relocated there before the end of the month. However, space was not available for all the group's squadrons on Stirling Island and the 390th continued to use Stirling as a staging base until July 1944, engaging primarily in the neutralization of enemy airfields and harbor facilities on New Britain, but it also supported ground forces on Bougainville Island and attacked shipping in the northern Solomons and the Bismarck Archipelago.

New Guinea

In July 1944, the squadron air echelon began moving to New Guinea and the Cyclops Airstrip and Sentani Airstrip near Hollandia. It was early September before the entire air echelon of the 42d group arrived in New Guinea, with the latecomers practicing skip bombing and participating in mock invasion exercises in the Russell Islands and Admiralty Islands. Through January 1945, it bombed airfields and installations on New Guinea, Celebes, and Halmahera, and flew reconnaissance missions. The squadron also detached Mitchells to act as navigation ships for Douglas A-20 Havocs of the 312th Bombardment Group attacking targets in southwestern New Guinea. The A-20s were not equipped with bombsights and could only make medium altitude attacks by "dropping on leader" (releasing their bombload at the same time as the lead aircraft, equipped with a bombsight, in a formation). Squadron aircraft also dropped food and supplies to isolated parties in the interior of the island. Little more than a week after the last elements of the air echelon arrived in the Hollandia area, the air echelon departed for the Mar Airstrip near Sansapor, linking up with its ground echelon, which had been there since late August, having arrived by ship from the Russell Islands. However, Mar was not ready for the unit's planes and it operated from Middleburg Island for a few days until the pierced steel planking runway at Mar was ready.

Philippines

The 390th moved to the Philippines in March 1945. By the time it had settled in at Puerto Princesa Airfield, its original flying cadre from the Solomons campaign had rotated back to the United States after flying the required number of missions. However, few of the ground crews were returned to the States, although many had expected to be relieved when rotation policies were announced, but then cancelled. From this base on Palawan the squadron attacked shipping along the China coast, struck targets in French Indochina, bombed airfields and installations in the Philippines, and supported ground operations on Mindanao. Ground support including air delivering DDT over the landing beaches to suppress disease-bearing insects. Its missions during the campaign in the Philippines earned it a Philippine Presidential Unit Citation.

The 390th was awarded a Distinguished Unit Citation for its pre-invasion bombing of Balikpapan between 23 and 30 June 1945. Balikpapan was a center for oil refining on Borneo held by the Japanese. These attacks included bombing and strafing enemy shore installations. The round trip to the target was over 1700 miles and was among the longest flown by medium bombers during the war. Pre mission experiments determined that the squadron's bombers could carry a bomb load over this distance with fuel tanks installed in their radio compartments despite having to take off from a runway damaged by enemy action. Four of the missions encountered severe tropical weather fronts. Despite intense and accurate flak, the squadron destroyed gun positions, warehouses, roadblocks, fuel and ammunition dumps, a radar station as well as huge stores of gasoline and oil which the enemy had placed in position to be released into shallow pits oil the beach and ignited when the Australian ground troops made their assaults. The unit attacked the beach while naval underwater demolition teams operated offshore without losing a man. The attacks were so effective that the Australian Seventh Division was able to come ashore without enemy opposition.

The squadron's final combat action of World War II was attacking isolated Japanese units on Luzon during July and August 1945. In August it was alerted for a move to Okinawa. However, with the end of the war, the move was cancelled.

=== Cold War ===
Strategic Air Command (SAC) activated the 90th Air Refueling Squadron at Castle Air Force Base, California in January 1954. The squadron received its personnel and Boeing KC-97 Stratofreighters from the 340th Air Refueling Squadron, which moved without personnel and equipment to Whiteman Air Force Base, Missouri. Within months, the squadron deployed to Ernest Harmon Air Force Base, Labrador, where it provided forward based air refueling support for SAC bombers.

The squadron deployed to Sidi Slimane Air Base, Morocco for three months in April 1955. Shortly after returning, it moved on paper to Forbes Air Force Base, Kansas in August 1955, arriving as its parent, the 90th Strategic Reconnaissance Wing, was returning from a four-month deployment to Eielson Air Force Base, Alaska. At Forbes, the squadron began building up again and began flying air refueling missions in February 1956. The squadron flew KC-97G Stratotankers in support of USAF operations on a worldwide basis. Starting in May 1958, the squadron also supported the Boeing RB-47 Stratojet combat crew training mission of the 90th Wing. The squadron continued periodic deployments to support Operation Reflex, which based SAC B-47 bombers in North Africa and Europe. In June 1960 the 90th wing became non-operational and the squadron was reassigned to the 40th Bombardment Wing, also located at Forbes, until it was inactivated with the phaseout of the KC-97 from SAC.

In September 1985 the 390th Bombardment Squadron and the 90th Air Refueling Squadron were consolidated into a single unit.

=== Air Mobility ===
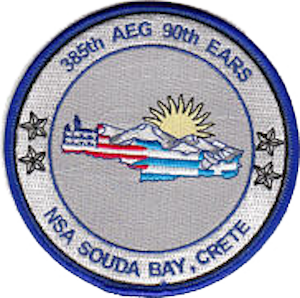
Squadron morale patch used at Souda Bay

In June 2002 the consolidated squadron was redesignated the 90th Expeditionary Air Refueling Squadron, converted to provisional status, and assigned to Air Mobility Command to activate or inactivate as needed. The unit was active at Incirlik Air Base, Turkey as a Boeing KC-135 Stratotanker organization as part of the 385th Air Expeditionary Group. The squadron was composed of a mix of members from active duty, the Air National Guard, and the Air Force Reserve. It participated on Operation Iraqi Freedom in Iraq and Operation Enduring Freedom in Afghanistan. After 2005, the squadron mission changed from refueling fighter aircraft, focusing instead on refueling Lockheed C-5 Galaxys and McDonnell Douglas C-17 Globemaster IIIs entering and departing the area of operations. This forward refueling permits the transports to minimize the time they are on the ground, because they can load or offload their loads without spending additional time to refuel. In March 2013, the squadron departed Incirlik for another location in Southwest Asia.

== Lineage ==
390th Bombardment Squadron

- Constituted as the 390th Bombardment Squadron (Medium) on 4 March 1942

Activated on 20 March 1942
Redesignated 390th Bombardment Squadron, Medium on 4 March 1942
Inactivated on 27 January 1946
Consolidated with the 90th Air Refueling Squadron as the 90th Air Refueling Squadron on 19 September 1985

90th Air Refueling Squadron

- Constituted as the 90th Air Refueling Squadron, Medium on 6 November 1953

Activated on 18 January 1954
Discontinued and inactivated on 15 November 1962

- Consolidated with the 390th Bombardment Squadron on 19 September 1985
- Redesignated 90th Expeditionary Air Refueling Squadron on 12 June 2002

Activated in 2002

=== Assignments ===
- 42d Bombardment Group, 20 March 1942 – 27 January 1946
- 93d Bombardment Wing, 18 January 1954 (attached to unknown c. 3 April – 18 May 1954, 90th Strategic Reconnaissance Wing 1 April – 16 July 1955)
- 90th Strategic Reconnaissance Wing, 5 August 1955
- 40th Bombardment Wing, 20 June 1960 – 15 November 1962
- Air Mobility Command to activate or inactivate as needed, 12 June 2002

385th Air Expeditionary Group, c. 2005 – c. 15 March 2013
Unknown after March 2013

=== Stations ===
- Gowen Field, Idaho, 20 March 1942
- McChord Field, Washington, 20 March 1942 – 15 March 1943
- New Caledonia, 15 April 1943
- Nandi Airfield, Fiji Islands, 23 April 1943
- Carney Airfield, Guadalcanal, Solomon Islands, 11 May 1943
- Renard Field, Banika, Russell Islands, 22 October 1943

Operated from Stirling Airfield, Solomon Islands, 8 March – 8 May 1944, and 17 June – 24 July 1944

- Hollandia Airfield Complex, New Guinea, c. 7 August 1944
- Sansapor Airfield, New Guinea, 23 August 1944

Operated from Wama Airfield, Morotai, Netherlands East Indies, after 24 February 1945

- Puerto Princesa Airfield, Palawan, Philippines, c. 21 March 1945 – 27 January 1946
- Castle Air Force Base, California, 18 January 1954
- Forbes Air Force Base, Kansas, 5 August 1955 – 15 November 1962
- Incirlik Air Base, Turkey, 2002
- Unknown location in Southwest Asia, 15 March 2013

=== Aircraft ===
- Douglas B-18 Bolo, 1942
- Lockheed A-29 Hudson, 1942
- Martin B-26 Marauder, 1941–1943
- North American B-25 Mitchell, 1943–1945
- Boeing KC-97 Stratofreighter, 1954–1962
- Boeing KC-135R Stratotanker3

=== Awards and campaigns ===
Award streamer	Award	Dates	Notes
	Distinguished Unit Citation	23 June 1945 – 30 June 1945	Balikpapan, Borneo 390th Bombardment Squadron
	Air Force Meritorious Unit Award	1 June 2010 – 31 May 2011	90th Expeditionary Air Refueling Squadron
	Air Force Outstanding Unit Award	1 October 2006 – 30 September 2007	90th Expeditionary Air Refueling Squadron
	Air Force Outstanding Unit Award	1 October 2007 – 30 September 2008	90th Expeditionary Air Refueling Squadron
	Air Force Outstanding Unit Award	1 October 2008 – 30 September 2009	90th Expeditionary Air Refueling Squadron
	Philippine Republic Presidential Unit Citation	1945	390th Bombardment Squadron

Campaign Streamer	Campaign	Dates	Notes
	Antisubmarine	20 March 1942 – 15 March 1943	390th Bombardment Squadron
	New Guinea	c. 7 August 1944 – 31 December 1944	390th Bombardment Squadron
	Northern Solomons	15 April 1943 – 21 November 1944	390th Bombardment Squadron
	Bismarck Archipelago	15 December 1943 – 27 November 1944	390th Bombardment Squadron
	Western Pacific	17 April 1944 – 2 September 1945	390th Bombardment Squadron
	Leyte	17 October 1944 – 1 July 1945	390th Bombardment Squadron
	Luzon	15 December 1944 – 4 July 1945	390th Bombardment Squadron
	Southern Philippines	27 February 1945 – 4 July 1945	390th Bombardment Squadron
	China Defensive	24 February 1945 – 4 May 1945	390th Bombardment Squadron
	China Offensive	5 May 1945 – 2 September 1945	390th Bombardment Squadron
	World War II Army of Occupation (Japan)	9 May 1945 – 5 May 1955	390th Bombardment Squadron
	Liberation of Iraq	19 March 2003 – 1 May 2003	920th Expeditionary Air Refueling Squadron

== See also ==
- List of United States Air Force air refueling squadrons
