= Koli Airfield =

Former airfield on the Solomon Islands

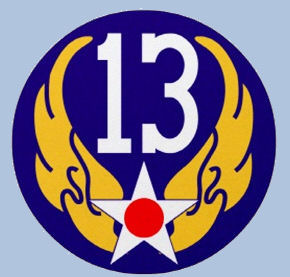
Koli Airfield
- Part of Thirteenth Air Force
- Guadalcanal, Solomon Islands
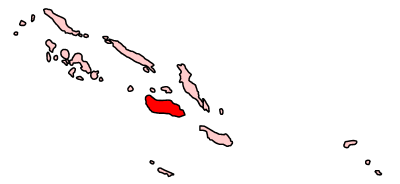
- Location of Guadalcanal in the Solomon Islands

Site information
- Type: Military airfield
- Controlled by: United States Army Air Forces

Location
- Coordinates: 09°27′28.94″S 160°10′41.50″E

Site history
- Built: 1943
- In use: 1943-1944

Koli Airfield (also known as Bomber 3 Field) is a former World War II airfield on Guadalcanal, Solomon Islands in the South Pacific, located near Koli Point, eight miles east of Henderson Field, close to the Metapona River to the east and the Naumbu River to the west. The airfield was abandoned after the war and today is almost totally returned to its natural state.

== History ==
This airfield was built for B-24 Liberator heavy bomber operations, primarily by the Thirteenth Air Force. The single strip ran approximately NE to SW (parallel to Carney Airfield) and had several taxiways off both sides. Surfaced by bitumen with metal, Marsden Matting-like material for heavy aircraft and was completed in the middle of 1943.

Units assigned were:

- 42d Bombardment Group, 6 June-20 October 1943
- 307th Bombardment Group, February 1943-28 January 1944

Disused since the war. Bomber 3 strip was used for drying Copra at the nearby plantation, and parts of the airfield are used as a road.

== See also ==
- Carney Airfield
- Kukum Field
- USAAF in the South Pacific
