= XIII Fighter Command =

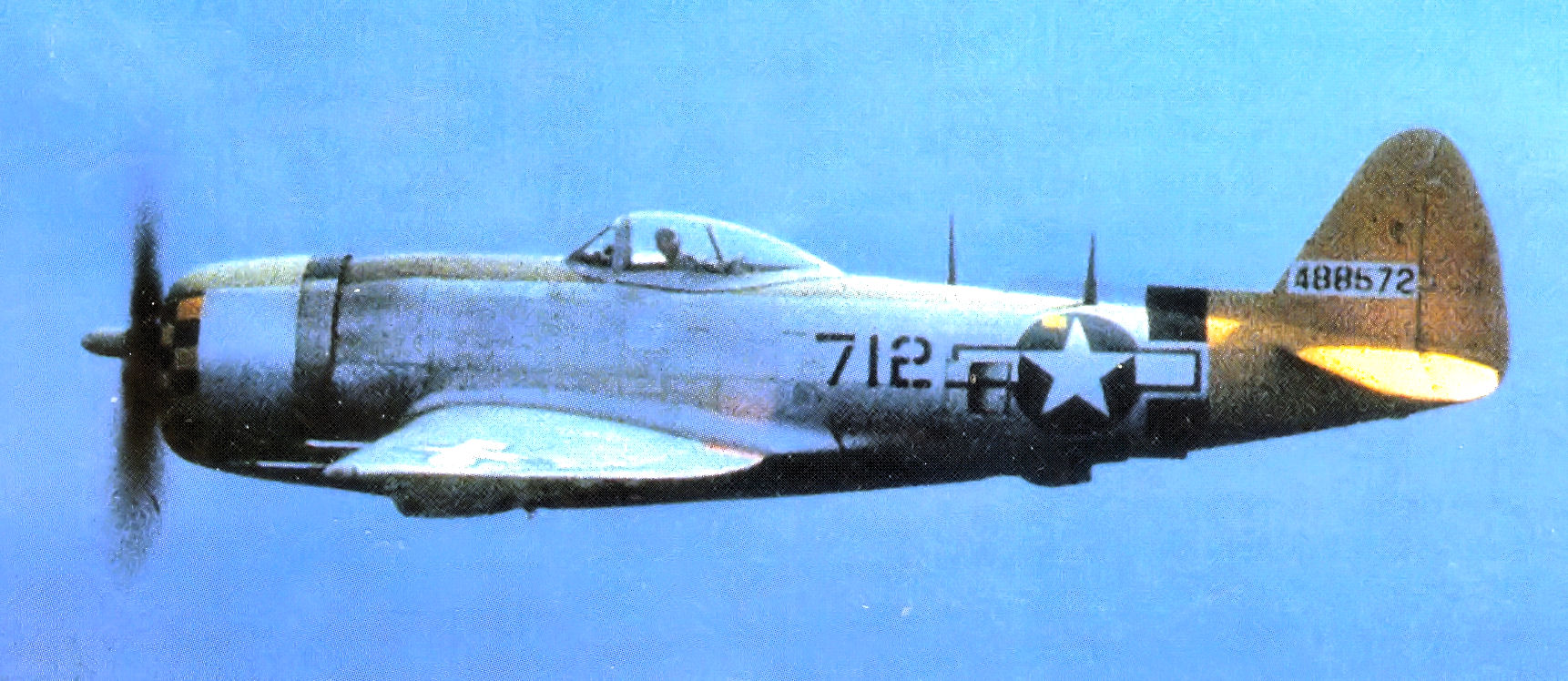
- Command P-47 Thunderbolt (Note: Aircraft is Republic P-47N-5-RE Thunderbolt, serial 44-88572 of the 413th Fighter Squadron.)
- Active: 1943–1946
- Country: United States
- Branch: United States Air Force
- Role: Command of fighter units
- Engagements: Southwest Pacific Theater; China-Burma-India Theater

Commanders
- Notable commanders: Brig Gen Dean C. Strother

The XIII Fighter Command was a United States Army Air Forces formation. It was last assigned to Thirteenth Air Force, based at Manila, Luzon, Philippines. It was inactivated on 15 March 1946.

== History ==
XIII Fighter Command was a World War II command and control organization for Thirteenth Air Force. Its mission was to provide command and control authority of Army Air Force fighter organizations within the Thirteenth Air Force Area of Responsibility.

It participated in the following campaigns: China Defensive; Guadalcanal; New Guinea; Northern Solomons; Bismarck Archipelago; Western Pacific; Leyte; Luzon; Southern Philippines; China Offensive.

== Lineage ==
- Constituted as the XIII Fighter Command on 14 December 1942

Activated on 13 January 1943
Inactivated on 15 March 1946
Disbanded on 8 October 1948

=== Assignments ===
- Thirteenth Air Force, 13 January 1943 – 15 March 1946

=== Stations ===
- Plaine Des Gaiacs Airfield, New Caledonia, Melanesia, 13 January 1943
- Pekoa Airfield, Espiritu Santo, New Hebrides, 22 January 1943
- Carney Airfield, Guadalcanal, Solomon Islands, December 1943
- Sansapor (March) Airfield, Netherlands East Indies, 15 August 1944
- Bayug Airfield, Burauen, Leyte, Philippines, 10 January 1945
- Puerto Princesa Airfield, Palawan, Philippines, 1 March 1945
- Manila, Luzon, Philippines, November 1945 – 15 March 1946

=== Components ===
Groups

- 18th Fighter Group, 14 April 1943 – 15 March 1946
- 42nd Bombardment Group, attached 1 October 1944 – 8 January 1945, c. 22 March – c. September 1945
- 347th Fighter Group: 13 January 1943 – 1 January 1946 (attached to I Island Command 1 July – c. 29 December 1943)
- 414th Fighter Group: 1 January–30 September 1946

Squadrons

- 17th Photographic Reconnaissance Squadron: 10 December 1945 – 1 February 1946
- 419th Night Fighter Squadron: 25 August 1944 – 10 January 1946
- 550th Night Fighter Squadron: 12 December 1944 – 15 December 1945 (attached to XIII Bomber Command 14 February 1945, 85th Fighter Wing 7 April – c. 17 June 1945)

== See also ==
- United States Army Air Forces in the South Pacific Area
