= Kukum Field =

Former World War II airfield on Guadalcanal, Solomon Islands

- Part of the Pacific Theater of World War II
- Guadalcanal, Solomon Islands
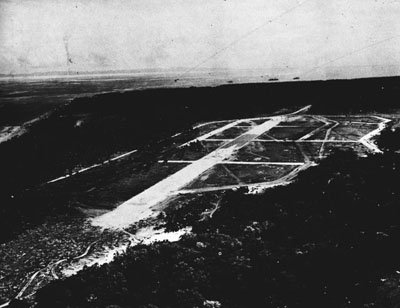
- Aerial view of Kukum Field

Site information
- Controlled by: USAAF; Royal New Zealand Air Force
- Condition: abandoned

Location
- Coordinates: 09°25′34″S 160°00′39″E

Site history
- Built: 1942–43
- Built by: Seebees/Marine Aviation Engineers
- In use: 1943–69
- Materials: Coral

Location of Kukum Field, Solomon Islands

Kukum Field also known as Fighter 2 Airfield is a former World War II airfield on Guadalcanal, Solomon Islands.

== World War II ==
From the beginning of the Guadalcanal Campaign it was planned that the area would be developed into a major air base. In November 1942 the 6th Naval Construction Battalion began work on a fighter strip at Lunga Point. The 6th Battalion was later replaced by the First Marine Aviation Engineers who completed the coral-surfaced runway by 1 January 1943. In June–July 1943 the 46th and 61st Battalions built a second coral-surfaced 4,000 feet (1,200 m) by 150 feet (46 m) runway with 75 feet (23 m) shoulders, coral taxiways 80 feet (24 m) wide, and 121 hardstands. The 26th Battalion built a tank farm providing storage for 2,000,000 US gallons (7,600,000 L; 1,700,000 imp gal) of aviation gasoline, 1,000,000 US gallons (3,800,000 L; 830,000 imp gal) of motor gasoline, and 42,000 US gallons (160,000 L; 35,000 imp gal) of diesel oil.

USAAF units based at Kukum included:

- 12th Fighter Squadron operating P-39s from 19 December 1943 – 19 February 1944
- 68th Fighter Squadron operating P-38s and P-39s from January – December 1943
- 339th Fighter Squadron operating P-38s from 2 October 1942 (det) – 1 December 1943 and 29 December 1943 – 15 January 1944

USMC units based at Kukum included:

- VMF-124 operating F4Us from 12 February – September 1943

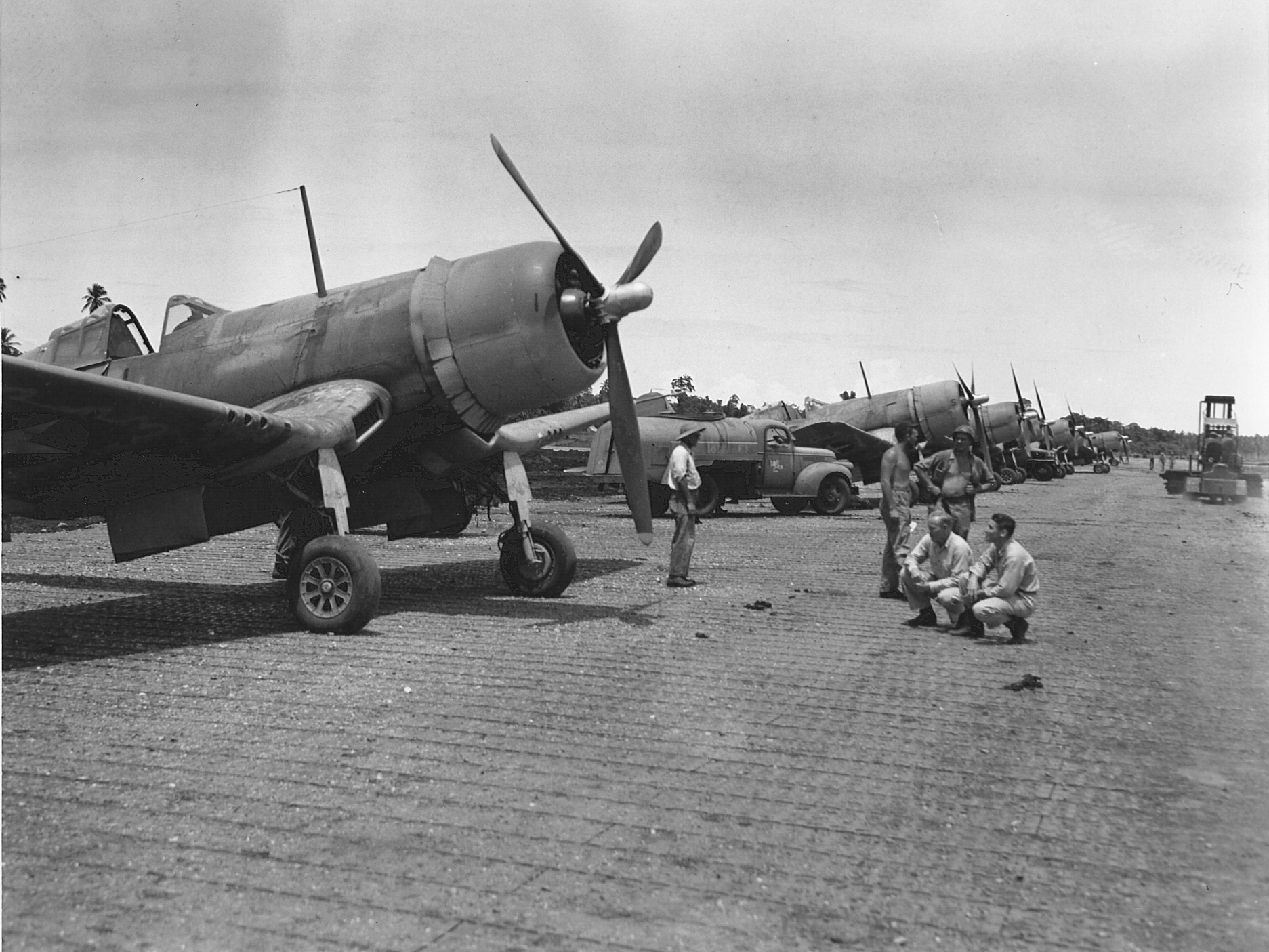
F4Us of VMF-124 on Guadalcanal

Royal New Zealand Air Force units based at Kukum included:

- 1 Squadron operating Lockheed Venturas from October 1944
- 2 Squadron operating Venturas from August – October 1944
- 3 Squadron operating Venturas from July – August 1944
- 14 Squadron operating P-40s from 11 June – 25 July 1943
- 15 Squadron operating P-40s 26 April – June 1943 and from mid-September – mid-November 1943
- 16 Squadron operating P-40s from 25 July – September 1943
- 17 Squadron operating P-40s from mid-September – 20 October 1943

== Postwar ==
Kukum Field remained operational after the war as a civilian airfield until 1969 when Henderson Field was modernized and reopened as Honiara International Airport. The airfield is now part of the Honiara Golf Course.

== See also ==
- Carney Airfield
- Henderson Field (Guadalcanal)
- Koli Airfield
- United States Army Air Forces in the South Pacific Area
