= 424th Bombardment Squadron =

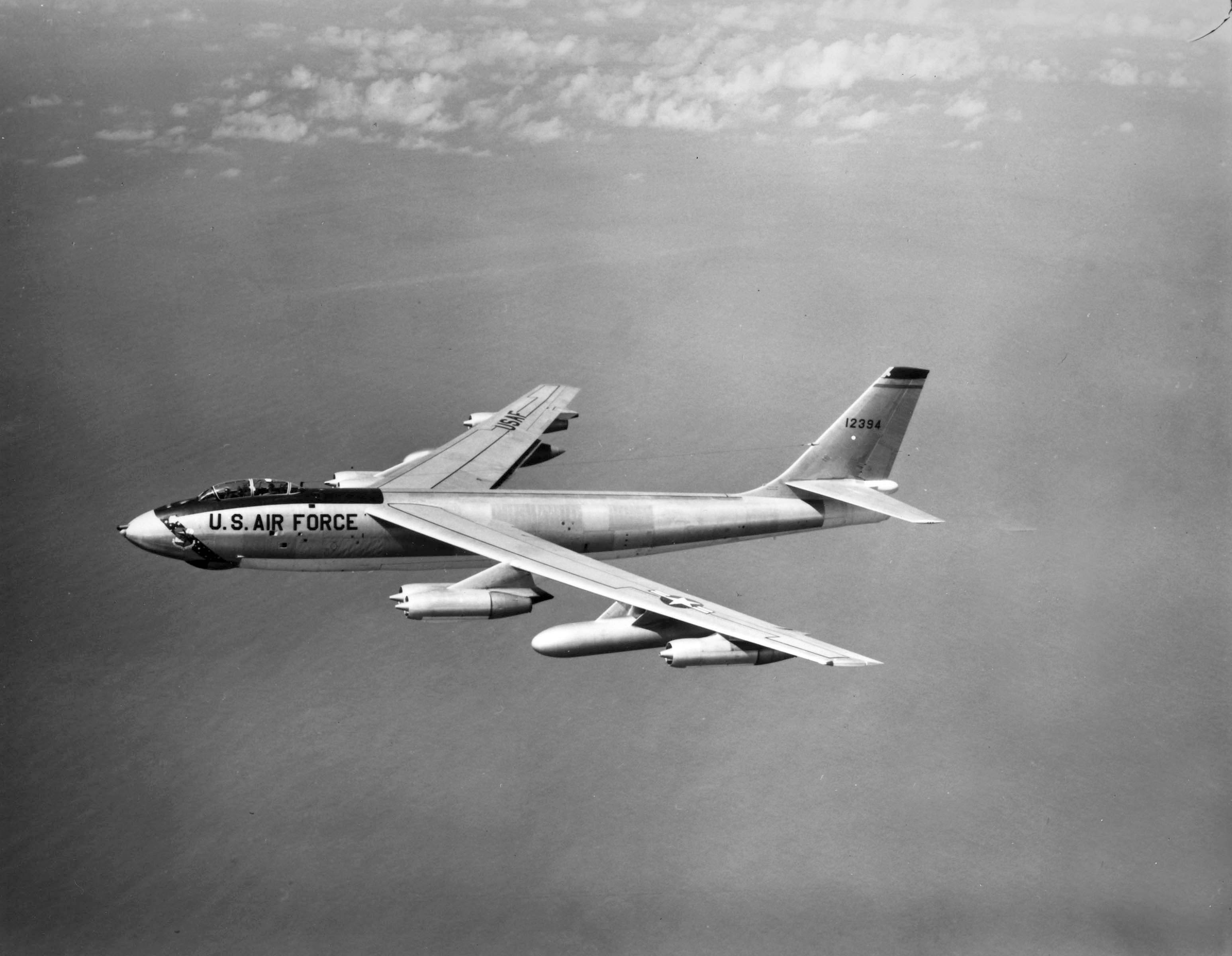
- B-47E Stratojet as flown by the 424th at Lincoln AFB (Note: Aircraft is Boeing B-47E-55-BW Stratojet, serial 51-2394. In March 1960, it was modified as an NB-47E.)
- Active: 1942–1945; 1953–1954; 1958–1962
- Country: United States
- Branch: United States Air Force
- Role: Bombardment
- Motto: Semper Paratus (Latin for 'Always Ready') (1958-1962)
- Engagements: South Pacific Theater, Southwest Pacific Theater
- Decorations: Distinguished Unit Citation; Philippine Presidential Unit Citation

Insignia
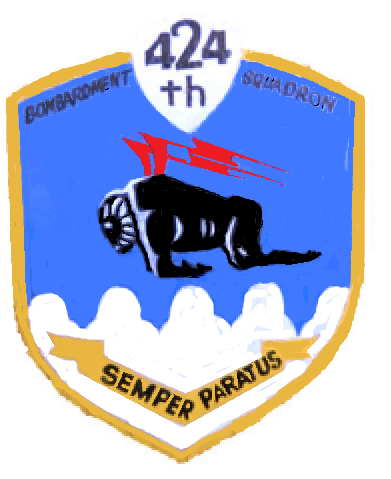
- 424th Bombardment Squadron emblem (SAC) (Note: This emblem was not included in the squadron entry in Maurer, so apparently not officially approved.)

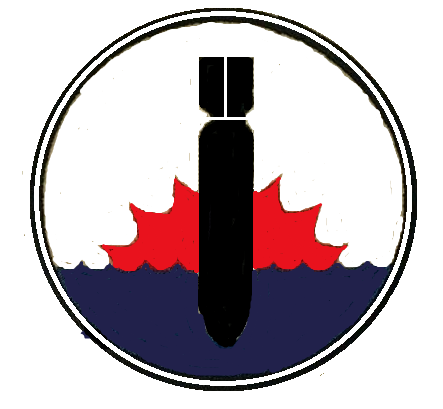
- 424th Bombardment Squadron emblem (Note: Approved 24 February 1943. Description: A disc piped black, per fess debased engrailed argent and azure, issuing from partition line a red sun rayed proper, surmounted by a black aerial bomb palewise, point to base.)

The 424th Bombardment Squadron is an inactive United States Air Force unit. Its last assignment was with the 307th Bombardment Wing at Lincoln Air Force Base, Nebraska, where it was inactivated on 1 January 1962.

The squadron was first activated in April 1942 as the 34th Reconnaissance Squadron, one of the original four squadrons of the 307th Bombardment Group, but was redesignated the 424th Bombardment Squadron shortly afterwards. After training in the United States, it deployed to the Pacific, serving mainly in the Southwest Pacific Theater. The squadron earned two Distinguished Unit Citations for its actions in combat. Following V-J Day, it returned to the United States for inactivation.

The squadron was activated as a light bomber crew training unit during the Korean War, replacing an Air National Guard unit that had been mobilized for the war and was returning to state control. It was inactivated and its personnel and equipment transferred to another unit in connection with the upgrade of the unit to jet bombers. It was activated again in 1958 when Strategic Air Command (SAC) expanded its Boeing B-47 wings from three to four squadrons. When SAC's alert commitment changed, it was inactivated in 1962.

== History ==
=== World War II ===
The squadron was activated at Geiger Field, Washington on 15 April 1942 as the 35th Reconnaissance Squadron, one of the original four squadrons of the 307th Bombardment Group. A week later, it was redesignated the 424th Bombardment Squadron. It was first equipped with Boeing B-17 Flying Fortresses, but while still in training converted to Consolidated B-24 Liberators. In addition to training with these heavy bombers, it also flew some antisubmarine patrols off the Pacific northwest coast. In October 1942, it began its movement to Hawaii.

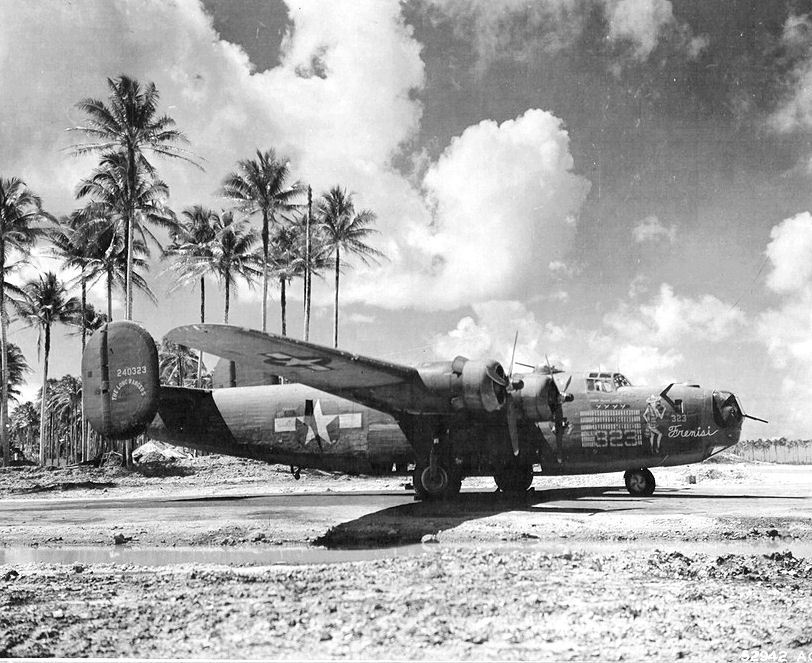
B-24D Frenisi at Wakde Airfield (Note: Aircraft is Consolidated B-24D-50-CO, serial 42-40323. This aircraft flew 104 combat missions in the Pacific. Photo taken: 8 September 1944, Wakde Airfield, Netherlands East Indies. It was condemned on 31 October 1944. Baugher, Joe (7 September 2023). "1942 USAF Serial Numbers". Joe Baugher.)

The squadron arrived at Dillingham Airfield, Hawaii in November 1942, continuing its training in the Liberator and flying search and antisubmarine patrols in defense of Hawaii as part of Seventh Air Force. In December 1942, it staged through Naval Air Station Midway to attack Wake Island.

In February 1943, the squadron was relieved from assignment to Seventh Air Force and began to operate under the control of Thirteenth Air Force, although it did not move to Koli Airfield, Guadalcanal, in the Solomon Islands until March. From Guadalcanal, it struck enemy airfields and military installations along with shipping in the Solomon Islands and Bismarck Archipelago. It helped neutralized enemy bases in Yap, Truk and Palau. On 29 March 1944, the squadron made an unescorted daylight attack on heavily defended airfields in the Truk Islands for which it was awarded a Distinguished Unit Citation (DUC).

As American forces moved forward, it supported operations in the Philippines by strikes against enemy shipping in the southern Philippines and striking airfields on Leyte, Luzon, Negros, Ceram and Halmahera and supported Allied operations in the Netherlands East Indies. It flew an unescorted mission attacking the oil refineries at Balikpapan on Borneo on 3 October 1944, for which it was awarded a second DUC.

In the closing months of the war in the Pacific, it supported Australian forces on Borneo and attacked targets in Indochina. After V-J Day, it ferried liberated prisoners from Okinawa to the Philippines and flew patrols along the coast of China. It moved to Clark Field in the Philippines in September 1945 and returned to the United States for inactivation at the Port of Embarkation in December 1945.

=== Light bomber crew training ===
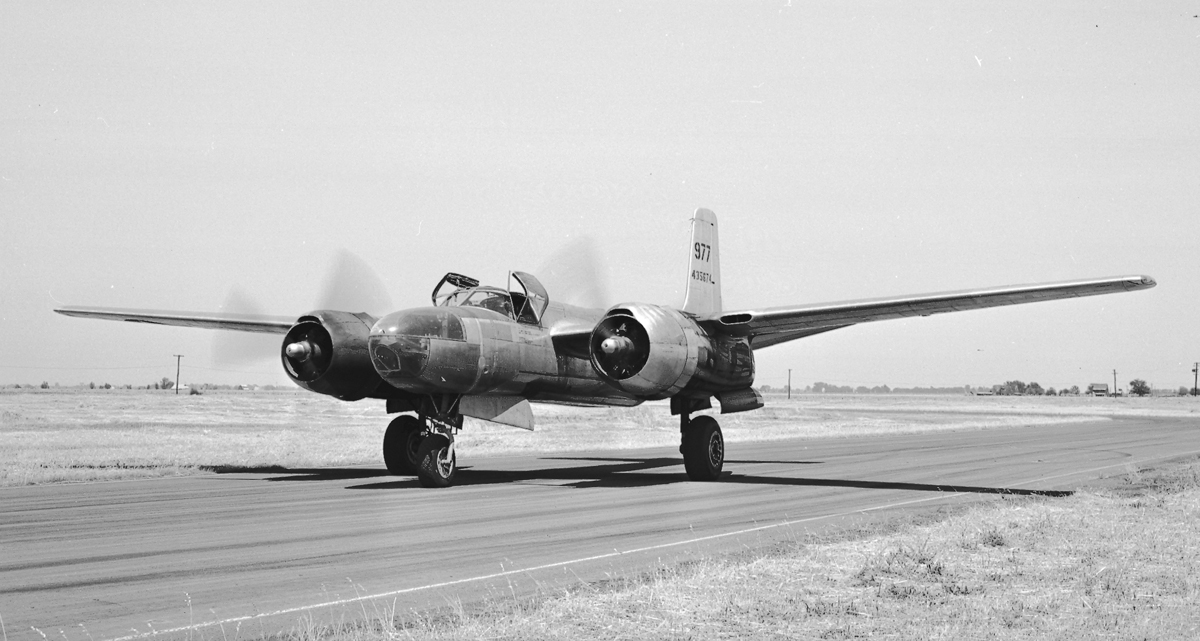
Douglas A-26 Invader as flown by the 424th

During and immediately after the Korean War, Tactical Air Command (TAC) trained aircrews for the Douglas B-26 Invader at Langley Air Force Base, Virginia. The three squadrons of the 4400th Combat Crew Training Group performing this mission were Air National Guard units that had been mobilized for the war. At the start of 1953, these squadrons were returned to state control and the 424th was activated and took over the mission, personnel, and equipment of the 122d Bombardment Squadron, which returned to the Louisiana Air National Guard. In January 1954, the group mission shifted to tactical bombardment and it was redesignated the 4400th Bombardment Group. As the group began to anticipate the transition to Martin B-57 Canberra aircraft, TAC decided to replace the Table of Distribution 4400th Group and its squadrons with the regular 345th Bombardment Group, which took over their mission in July 1954 and the 424th was inactivated.

=== Strategic Air Command ===
The squadron was activated for a third time in September 1958 as Strategic Air Command (SAC)'s Boeing B-47 Stratojet fleet reached a peak of twenty-seven wings In 1958, the Boeing B-47 Stratojet wings of SAC assumed an alert posture at their home bases, reducing the amount of time spent on alert at overseas bases. The SAC alert cycle divided itself into four parts: planning, flying, alert and rest to meet General Thomas S. Power's initial goal of maintaining one third of SAC's planes on fifteen minute ground alert, fully fueled and ready for combat to reduce vulnerability to a Soviet missile strike. To implement this new system B-47 wings reorganized from three to four squadrons. The 424th was activated at Lincoln Air Force Base, Nebraska as the fourth squadron of the 307th Bombardment Wing. The alert commitment was increased to half the squadron's aircraft in 1962 and the four squadron pattern no longer met the alert cycle commitment, so the squadron was inactivated on 1 January 1962.

== Lineage ==
- Constituted as the 35th Reconnaissance Squadron (Heavy) on 28 January 1942

Activated on 15 April 1942
Redesignated 424th Bombardment Squadron (Heavy) on 22 April 1942
Redesignated 424th Bombardment Squadron, Heavy in 1944
Inactivated on 26 December 1945

- Redesignated 424th Bombardment Squadron, Light on 15 November 1952

Activated on 1 January 1953
Inactivated on 19 July 1954

- Redesignated 424th Bombardment Squadron, Medium on 11 August 1958

Activated on 1 September 1958
Discontinued and inactivated on 1 January 1962

=== Assignments ===
- 307th Bombardment Group, 15 April 1942 – 26 December 1945
- 4430th Air Base Wing (attached to 4400th Combat Crew Training Group), 1 January 1953
- 4400th Combat Crew Training Group (later 4400th Bombardment Group), 1 May 1953 – 19 July 1954
- 307th Bombardment Wing, 1 September 1958 – 1 January 1962

=== Stations ===
- Geiger Field, Washington, 15 April 1942
- Ephrata Army Air Base, Washington, 26 May 1942
- Sioux City Army Air Base, Iowa, 29 September – 20 October 1942
- Dillingham Airfield, Hawaii, 2 November 1942 (operated from Naval Air Station Midway Island, 22–24 December 1942; Funafuti Airfield, Nanumea, Gilbert Islands, 20 January – c. 1 February 1943; Luganville Airfield, Espiritu Santo, New Hebrides, c. 6 February – c. 18 March 1943)
- Koli Airfield, Guadalcanal, Solomon Islands, 18 March 1943 (operated from Munda Airfield, New Georgia, Solomon Islands, 28 January – 15 February 1944
- Momote Airfield, Los Negros, Admiralty Islands, 13 May 1944
- Wakde Airfield, Netherlands East Indies, 22 August 1944 (operated from Kornasoren (Yebrurro) Airfield, Noemfoor, Schouten Islands, 26 September – c. 8 November 1944)
- Wama Airfield, Morotai, Netherlands East Indies, 10 November 1944
- Clark Field, Luzon, Philippines, 5 September – 7 December 1945
- Camp Stoneman, California, 26 December 1945
- Langley Air Force Base, Virginia, 1 January 1953 – 19 July 1954
- Lincoln Air Force Base, Nebraska, 1 September 1958 – 1 January 1962

=== Aircraft ===
- Boeing B-17 Flying Fortress, 1942
- Consolidated B-24 Liberator, 1942–1945
- Douglas B-26 Invader, 1953–1954
- Boeing B-47 Stratojet, 1958–1961

=== Awards and campaigns ===
Award streamer	Award	Dates	Notes
	Distinguished Unit Citation	29 March 1944	Truk
	Distinguished Unit Citation	3 October 1944	Borneo
	Philippine Republic Presidential Unit Citation	17 October 44–4 July 45	

Campaign Streamer	Campaign	Dates	Notes
	Central Pacific	2 November 1942–18 March 1943	
	Air Combat, Asiatic–Pacific Theater	2 November 1942-7 December 1945	
	Guadalcanal	20 January 1943–21 February 1943	
	New Guinea	24 January 1943–31 December 1944	
	Northern Solomons	23 February 1943–21 November 1944	
	Eastern Mandates	7 December 1943–14 April 1944	
	Bismarck Archipelago	15 December 1943–27 November 1944	
	Leyte	17 October 1944–1 July 1945	
	Luzon	15 December 1944–4 July 1945	
	Southern Philippines	27 February 1945–4 July 1945	
	Western Pacific	17 April 1945–2 September 1945	
