= Carney Airfield =

Former World War II airfield on Guadalcanal, Solomon Islands

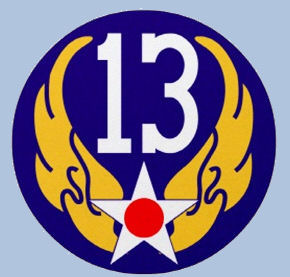
Carney Airfield
- Part of Thirteenth Air Force
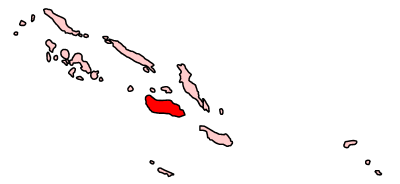
- Location of Guadalcanal in the Solomon Islands

Site information
- Type: Military Airfield
- Controlled by: United States Army Air Forces; United States Navy

Location
- Coordinates: 09°26′07.20″S 160°09′30.40″E

Site history
- Built: 1943
- In use: 1943-1944

Carney Airfield is a former World War II airfield on Guadalcanal, Solomon Islands in the South Pacific. It is located near Koli Point about six miles from Henderson Field, close to the Metapona River to the east and the Naumbu River to the west. The airfield was abandoned after the war and today is almost totally returned to its natural state.

== History ==
Also known as Bomber 2 Field, Carney Airfield is named for Captain J.V. Carney, USN a Naval Aviator who was Commanding Officer of Acorn Red One and of Naval Construction Battalion 14 (SeaBees) who was killed 16 December 1942 while taking off from the field, he was the pilot of an SBD Dauntless.

Designed as a fighter airfield, Carney hosted a number of USAAF command organizations and fighter squadrons, along with United States Navy PBY-4 Catalina squadrons.

Units assigned were:

- Headquarters, Thirteenth Air Force, 21 January-15 June 1944
- Headquarters, XIII Bomber Command, 20 August 1943-June 1944
- Headquarters, XIII Fighter Command, December 1943-15 August 1944
- 18th Fighter Group, 17 April 1943 – 23 August 1944
- 347th Fighter Group, 29 December 1943 – 15 January 1944
- 4th Reconnaissance Group, 6 May-12 December 1944
- 419th Night Fighter Squadron, 15 November 1943 – 21 August 1944

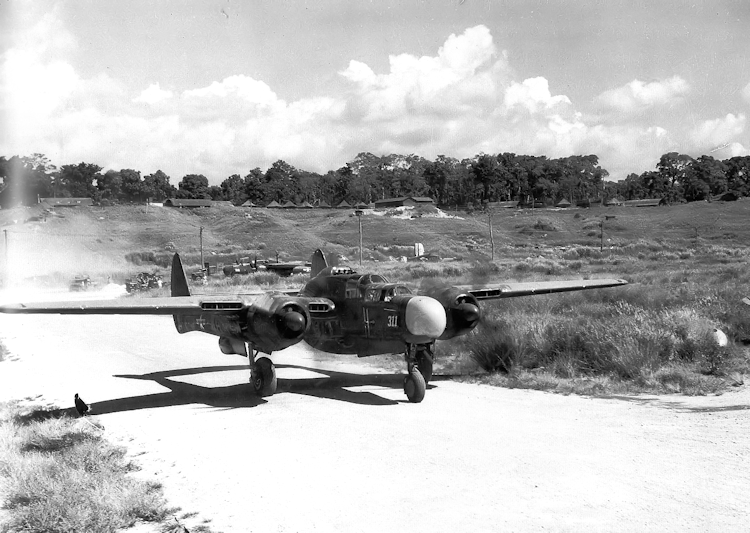
A Northrop P-61 Black Widow of the 419th Night Fighter Squadron taxiing at Carney Airfield in 1944

- VB-106 (PBY-4)
- VMD-254 (PBY-4)
- VB-101 (PB4Y-1)
- VB-102 (PB4Y-1)
- VB-104 (PB4Y-1)

After the war, the airfield was abandoned, and has fallen into a state of disuse.

== See also ==
- Koli Airfield
- Kukum Field
- USAAF in the South Pacific
