= 307th Bomb Wing =

US Air Force Reserve unit

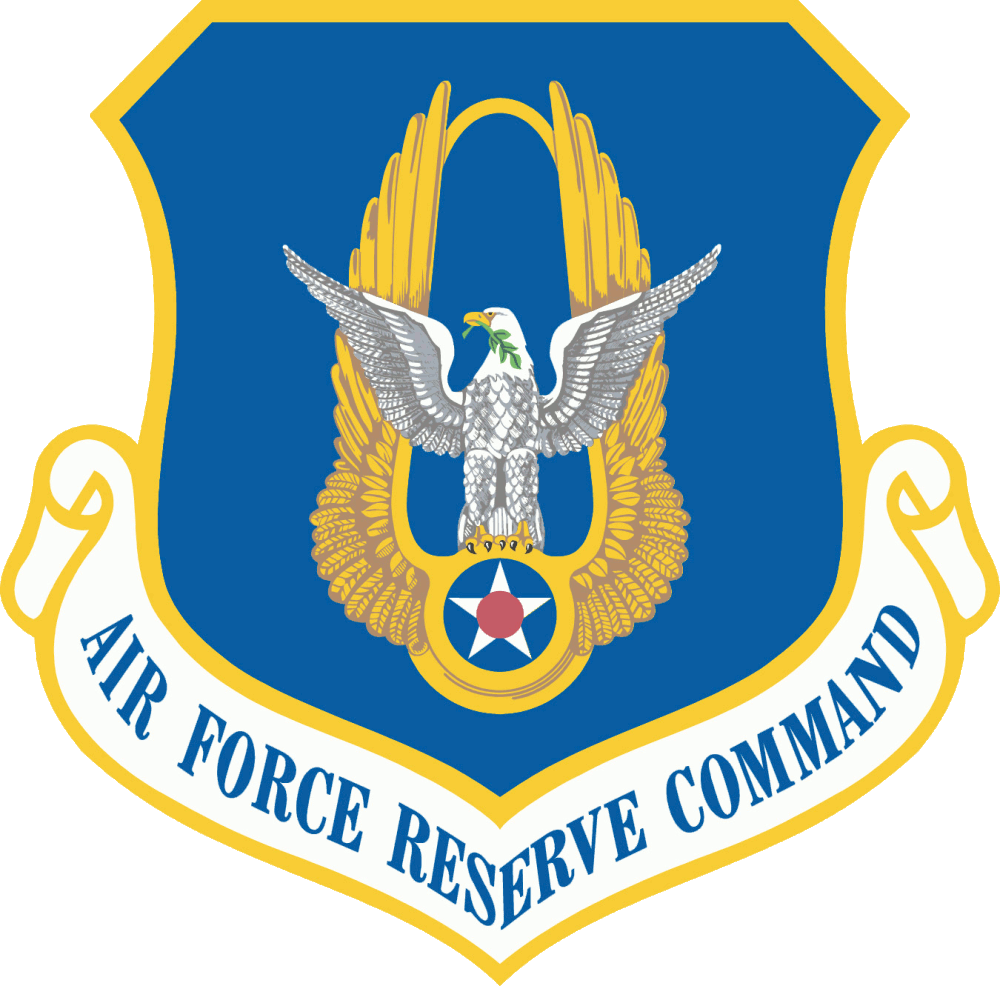
307th Bomb Wing

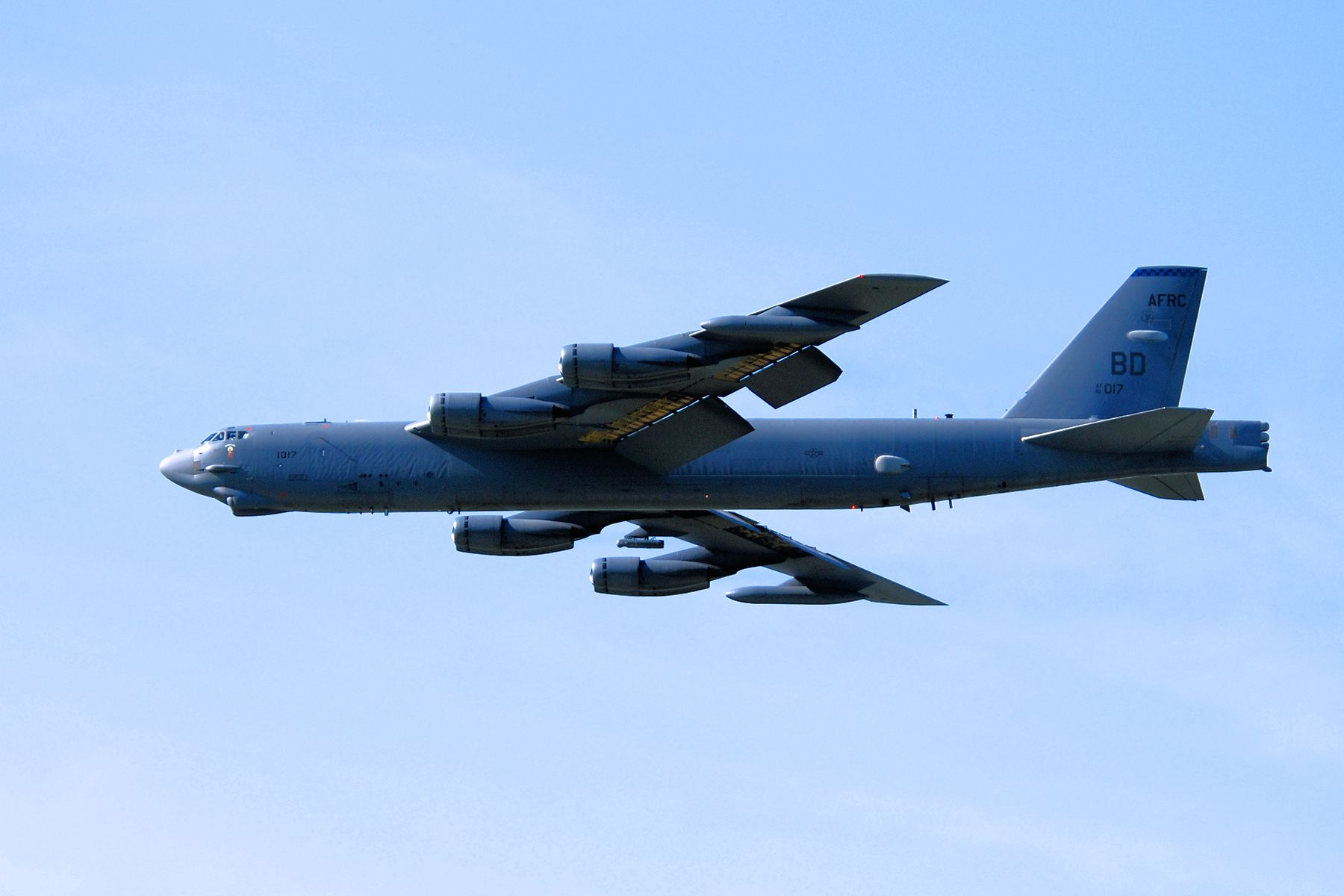
- Wing B-52H Stratofortress (Note: Aircraft is Boeing B-52H-170-BW Stratofortress, serial 61-0017.)
- Active: 1947–1948; 1948–1965; 1970–1975; 2011–present
- Country: United States
- Branch: United States Air Force
- Type: Wing
- Role: Strategic bomber
- Part of: Air Force Reserve Command
- Garrison/HQ: Barksdale Air Force Base, Louisiana
- Decorations: Presidential Unit Citation; Republic of Korea Presidential Unit Citation

Commanders
- Commander: Col David M. Martinez
- Deputy Commander: Col Aaron M. Hedrick
- Command Chief: CMSgt Jonathan R. Alejandro

Insignia
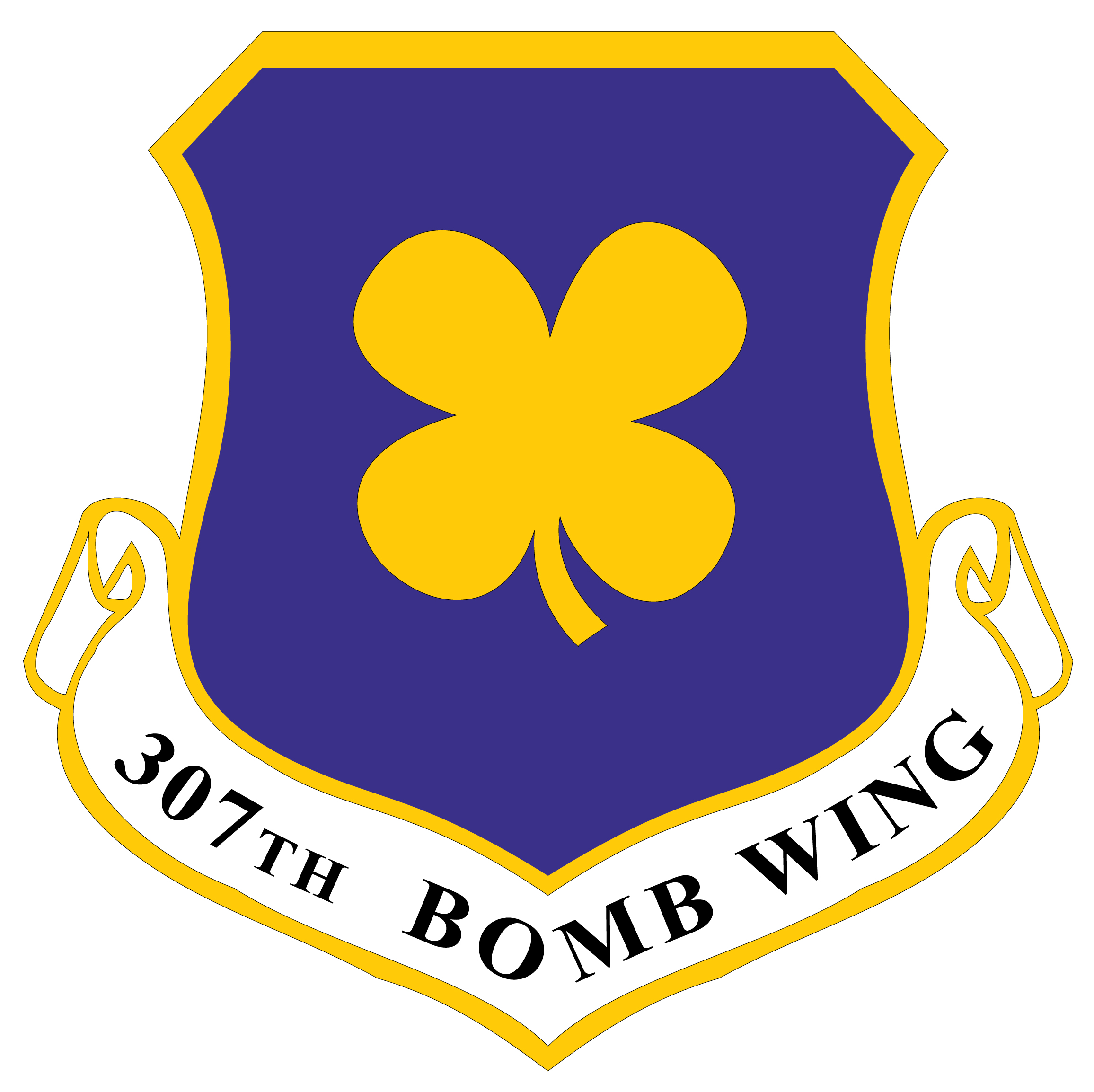
- 307th Bomb Wing emblem
- Tail code: BD

Aircraft flown
- Bomber: B-52H Stratofortress and B-1B Lancer

The 307th Bomb Wing is an Air Reserve component of the United States Air Force. It is assigned to the Tenth Air Force of Air Force Reserve Command, stationed at Barksdale Air Force Base, Louisiana. If mobilized, the wing is gained by Air Force Global Strike Command.

The wing was first activated in 1947 as part of the test of the Wing Base Organization system as the 307th Bombardment Wing as the headquarters for the 307th Bombardment Group and its supporting organizations. It served in the Korean War, where it earned a Presidential Unit Citation. It served as a strategic bomber organization until inactivated in 1965.

The wing was again activated as the 307th Strategic Wing in 1970 at U-Tapao Royal Thai Navy Airfield, Thailand. It managed deployed Strategic Air Command tankers and bombers participating in combat operations in Southeast Asia until it was inactivated on 30 September 1975.

With the divestiture of Fairchild Republic A-10 Thunderbolt II aircraft from Air Force Reserve Command's composite 917th Wing at Barksdale, the 917th was inactivated and its Boeing B-52 Stratofortress aircraft transferred to the reactivated 307th Bomb Wing on 8 January 2011.

On 17 October 2015 the Air Force reactivated the 489th Bomb Group under the wing. The 489 is a classic associate at Dyess Air Force Base, Texas flying the Rockwell B-1B Lancer.

== Overview ==
The wing is diverse, flying and maintaining 20 Boeing B-52H Stratofortress. The 307th Operations Group oversees three squadrons: the 93rd Bomb Squadron, which operates the B-52 Formal Training Unit and qualifies aircrew to operate the B-52 in active association with the 11th Bomb Squadron, the 343rd Bomb Squadron, which performs the nuclear enterprise and global strike missions in classic association with the 2nd Operations Group, the 307th Operations Support Squadron, which provides intelligence, aircrew life support and range operations services to the wing's full range of B-52 missions. The 489th Bomb Group, a geographically separated unit, operates in association with the 7th Operations Group at Dyess Air Force Base, Texas flying the Rockwell B-1 Lancer. In addition, the wing produces sorties for the 340th Weapons Squadron and the 49th Test and Evaluation Squadron to accomplish their mission.

== Units ==
The 307th Bomb Wing consists of the following major units:

- 307th Operations Group

93d Bomb Squadron
343d Bomb Squadron
307th Operations Support Squadron

- 489th Bomb Group

345th Bomb Squadron
489th Maintenance Squadron
489th Aerospace Medical Flight

- 307th Maintenance Group
- 307th Mission Support Group

== History ==
The 307th replaced the 94th Combat Bombardment Wing, Very Heavy Bomber (Provisional) and other organizations in August 1947. From then until 15 December 1948 the 307th Wing controlled, in addition to its own units, the 82d Fighter Wing at Grenier Field, New Hampshire. In September 1947 it began training other Strategic Air Command (SAC) combat units in anti-submarine warfare. In February, it began operating a Boeing B-29 Superfortress transition training school and standardized combat training for all SAC units.

=== Korean War ===
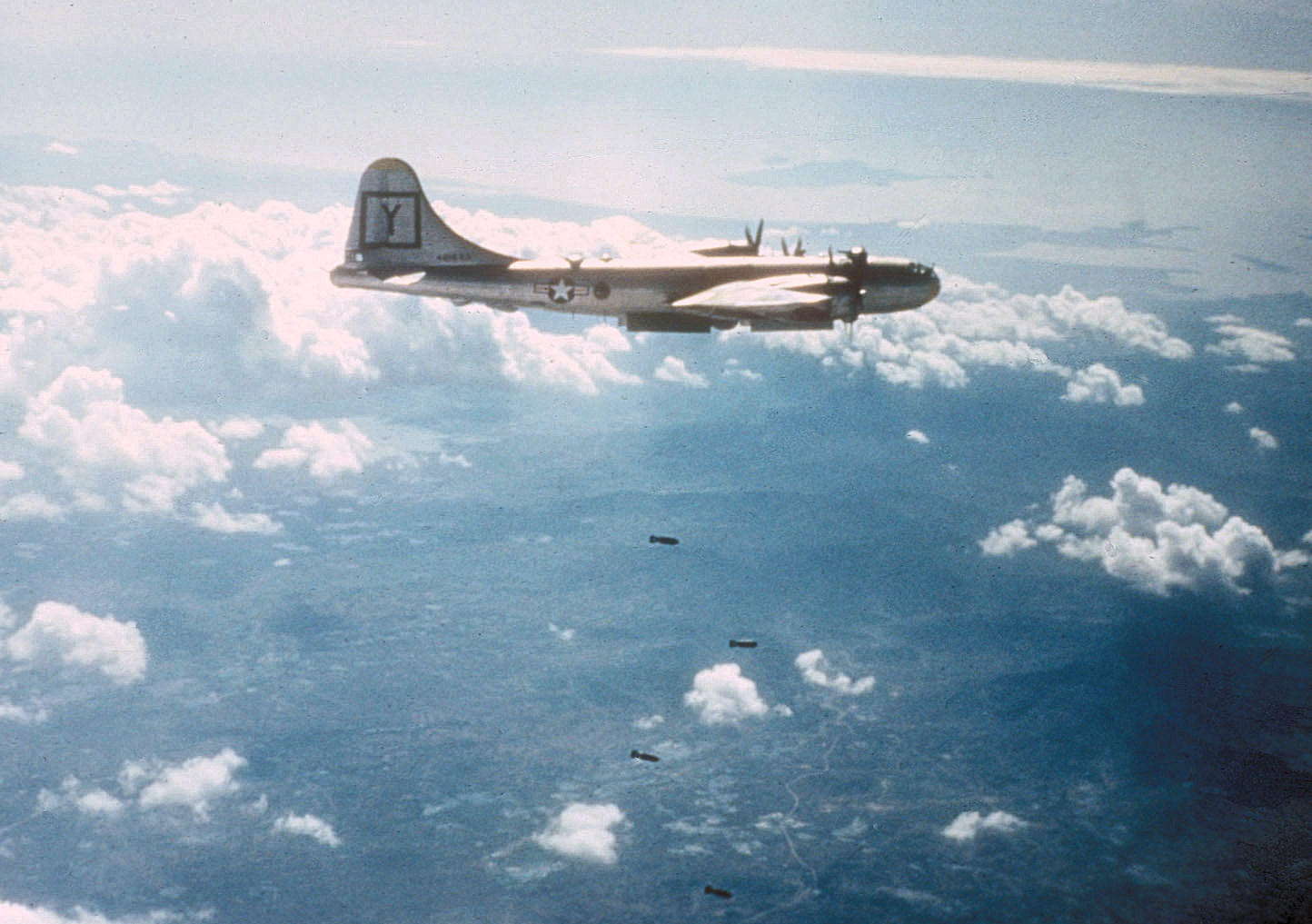
A 307th BG B-29 bombing a target in Korea, 1950–51.

In August 1950, the 307th deployed to Okinawa. Detached from SAC, it began operations under Far East Air Forces Bomber Command, Provisional. The attached 306th Bombardment Group transferred to its parent wing on 1 September 1950 and until 10 February 1951 the 307th had no tactical mission. On that date, wing resources were used to form the 6th Air Division at MacDill and the wing deployed without personnel to Kadena Air Base, where it absorbed resources of the 307th Bombardment Group and began flying combat missions.

During the Korean War, the 307th Wing received a Presidential Unit Citation for its extraordinary heroism in action against an enemy of the United Nations during the period of 11 to 27 July 1953. During this time it flew 93 sorties and dropped 860 tons of bombs on targets at the North Korean Simanju Airfield, where, despite severe airframe icing, intense enemy anti-aircraft fire and coordinated searchlight and fighter opposition, it rendered the airfield unserviceable. The 307th also flew the last B-29 Superfortress combat mission on 23 July 1953.

By the end of the hostilities, the wing (including its tactical group) had flown 5,810 combat sorties in 573 combat missions. The wing remained in the Far East, required to maintain combat readiness, and on 15 August 1953 Kadena became its permanent base.

=== Cold War ===
The 307th returned to the United States in November 1954 and left its B-29s at Davis–Monthan Air Force Base, Arizona. It proceeded to its new base, Lincoln Air Force Base, Nebraska. It replaced the propeller-driven B-29s with new Boeing B-47E Stratojet swept-wing medium bombers in 1955, capable of flying at high subsonic speeds and primarily designed for penetrating the airspace of the Soviet Union.

It conducted strategic bombardment training and air refueling operations to prepare, if necessary, for nuclear war. The 4362d Support Squadron (later the 4352d Post Attack Command and Control Squadron) was attached to the wing from 20 July 1962 until 24 December 1964. In January 1965 the wing began phasing down as Lincoln was being closed and the wing's B-47s were retired. It was inactivated on 25 March 1965.

=== Vietnam War ===
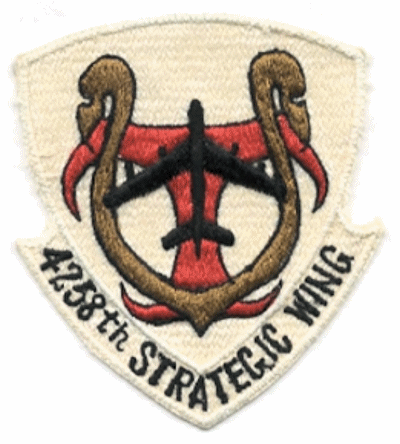
Emblem of the 4258th Strategic Wing

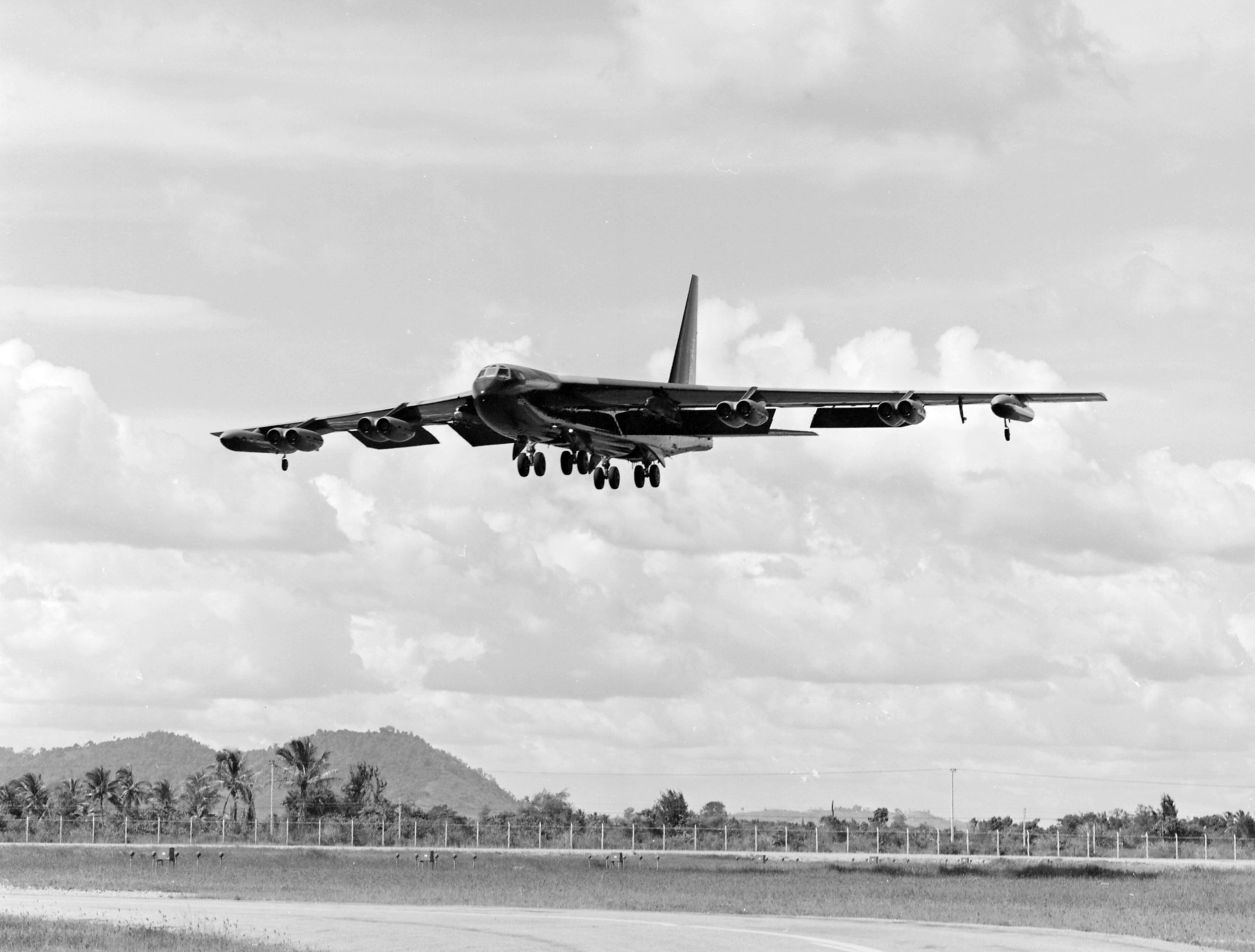
B-52D approaching U-Tapao 1972

The wing was again activated in 1970 as the 307th Strategic Wing when it replaced the 4258th Strategic Wing at U-Tapao Royal Thai Navy Airfield, Thailand. SAC organized the 4258th at U-Tapao on 2 June 1966 and assigned it to the 3d Air Division to supporting deployed Boeing KC-135 Stratotankers that engaged in combat operations over Southeast Asia during the Vietnam War. The wing was assigned three maintenance squadrons and received administrative and logistics support from the 635th Combat Support Group of Pacific Air Forces. The wing was detached from the 3d Air Division from organization until 25 October 1965. The following year, the wing added the 4258th Munitions Maintenance Squadron, which enabled it to support Boeing B-52 Stratofortress operations as well.

In 1970, in order to perpetuate the lineage of inactive bombardment units with illustrious World War II records, SAC received authority from Headquarters, USAF to discontinue its two Major Command controlled (MAJCON) strategic wings in the Pacific and replace them with Air Force controlled (AFCON) units, which could carry a lineage and history. (Note: MAJCON units could not carry a permanent history or lineage. Ravenstein, Charles A. (1984). A Guide to Air Force Lineage and Honors (2d, Revised ed.). Maxwell AFB, AL: USAF Historical Research Center. p. 12..) On 1 April 1970, the 4258th SW was discontinued and replaced by the 307th Strategic Wing which assumed its mission, personnel, and equipment on 1 February 1963. (Note: The 307th Wing continued, through temporary bestowal, the history, and honors of the World War II 307th Bombardment Group. It was also entitled to retain the honors (but not the history or lineage) of the 4258th.) The 4258th's maintenance squadrons were replaced by ones with the 307th numerical designation of the newly established wing. Each of the new units assumed the personnel, equipment, and mission of its predecessor. The 307th was the only regular Air Force SAC Wing stationed in Southeast Asia.

Using aircraft and crews deployed from the United States, the 307th conducted conventional bombardment operations and provided KC-135 aerial refueling (Young Tiger Tanker Task Force) of U.S. aircraft in Southeast Asia as directed through the Military Assistance Command, Vietnam. It ended all combat operations on 14 August 1973 as a result of the Congressionally mandated end of US Combat activities over Laos and Cambodia.

The final B-52 returned to its home unit in June 1975, but the wing continued some KC-135 and refueling operations supporting the USAF tactical units in Thailand until inactivated on 30 September 1975 as part of the USAF withdrawal from its Thai bases.

=== 2011 – present ===
The 307th Bomb Wing was reactivated at Barksdale AFB, Louisiana on 1 January 2011 with the 93rd and 343rd Bomb Squadrons. The Wing is assigned 18 B-52H Stratofortress aircraft.

On 9 July 2011 the 707th Maintenance Squadron was activated to support the 343rd Bomb Squadron at Barksdale Air Force Base.

During the Air Force Global Strike Challenge in November 2011, the 307th Bomb Wing was awarded the General Curtis LeMay Trophy for best bomber operations Wing in the Air Force.

On 4 June 2012 the 707th Maintenance Squadron reached a milestone with the certification of their first nuclear and conventional load crew on the B-52H Stratofortress. This certification made the 343rd Bomb Squadron and the 707th Maintenance Squadron the first Air Force Reserve Nuclear Squadron.

The 489th Bombardment Group was reactivated and redesignated the 489th Bomb Group at Dyess Air Force Base, Texas on 17 October 2015 with the 345th Bomb Squadron, 489th Maintenance Squadron and the 489th Aerospace Medicine Flight under the 307th Wing flying the B-1 Lancer as a classic association with the 7th Bomb Wing.

In April 2016, the 343rd Bomb Squadron deployed personnel to Al Udeid Air Base in support of Operation Inherent Resolve in support of the war on ISIS.

In August and September 2016, the 307th Bomb Wing supported and participated in NATO Exercise AMPLE STRIKE. The exercise was under the auspices of Operation Atlantic Resolve which is the United States' assurance and deterrence operation in the European Command.

In September 2016 the 307th Bomb Wing also participated in a multi-national community event called NATO Days. This event provided a forum for outreach with civilian and military leadership from the Czech Republic, Slovakia, and populations from surrounding nations.

The 307th continued to support the war against terrorism in 2017 with aircrew and maintainer deployed supporting the B-52 mission in Al Udeid Air Base for Operation Inherent Resolve and Operation Freedom's Sentinel.

In August and September 2017, the 307th Bomb Wing supported and participated in Exercise Ample Srike, which was Czech Republic led with two B-52s and two B-1s. This was a critical, annual exercise meant to increase proficiency levels of all forward air controllers and joint terminal air controllers, as well as to improve standardization and interoperability across NATO Allies and partners that included multiple European countries.

In March 2018, the 489th Bomb Group again led an integrated team that operated and maintained three B-1 Lancers in support of the Joint Interagency Task Force-South's Operation Titian. This operation led to the seizure of $270 million in narcotics.

In May and June 2018, the 489th led an integrated Bomber Task Force in support of the joint, multinational maritime-focused Exercise BALTOPS in the Baltic Sea. The exercise enhances flexibility and interoperability, and demonstrate resolve among allied and partner forces in defending the Baltic region.

In mid-2018 the 307th deployed over 200 civil engineers, security forces, services, support, and logistics readiness personnel in support of Operation Spartan Shield and Freedom Sentinel to various locations in southwest Asia for a period of approximately six months.

In September 2018 the 307th Bomb Wing's 93rd Bomb Squadron and 343rd Bomb Squadron again supported the Czech Republic led exercise with one B-52. At the same time the Wing supported the Bomber Task Force in Europe with a B-52 flying missions over Romania, the Arctic Circle and other European locations.

From September 2018 to March 2019 the 489th deployed members from their 345th Bomb Squadron and 489th Maintenance Squadron in support of the 7 BW's active duty CENTCOM deployment.

=== Lineage ===
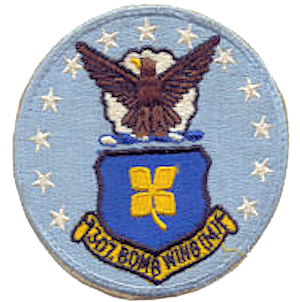
Emblem of the 307th Bombardment Wing

- Designated as 307th Bombardment Wing, Very Heavy on 28 July 1947
- Organized on 15 August 1947
- Discontinued on 12 July 1948
- Constituted as the 307th Bombardment Wing, Medium and activated on 12 July 1948
- Discontinued, and inactivated, on 25 March 1965
- Redesignated 307th Strategic Wing on 21 January 1970
- Activated on 1 April 1970
- Inactivated on 30 September 1975
- Redesignated 307th Bomb Wing and activated on 8 January 2011

=== Assignments ===
- Strategic Air Command, 15 August 1947 – 12 July 1948; 12 July 1948
- Fifteenth Air Force, 16 December 1948
- Second Air Force, 1 April 1950
- 6th Air Division, 10 February 1951

Attached to: Far East Air Forces Bomber Command, Provisional, 10 February – 11 August 1951
Attached to: Far East Air Forces Bomber Command, Provisional, ADVON, 12 August – 11 September 1951
Attached to: Far East Air Forces Bomber Command, Provisional, 12 September 1951 – 17 June 1954
Attached to: Twentieth Air Force, 18 June 1954

- 818th Air (later, 818th Strategic Aerospace) Division, 11 October 1954 – 25 March 1965

Remained attached to Twentieth Air Force to 19 November 1954
Attached to: 7th Air Division, 7 July – 5 October 1956

- Eighth Air Force, 1 April 1970

Attached to Air Division Provisional, 17th, 1 June 1972 – 31 December 1974

- 3d Air Division, 1 January – 30 September 1975
- 10th Air Force, 1 January 2011 – Present

=== Components ===
Wing

- 82d Fighter: attached 15 August 1947 – 12 July 1948; attached 12 July – 15 December 1948

Groups

- 306th Bombardment: attached 1 August 1948 – 31 August 1950 (not operational, 1–12 August 1948)
- 307th Operations: 15 August 1947 – 12 July 1948; 12 July 1948 – 16 June 1952 (detached 16 July – 3 November 1948 and 8 August 1950 – 9 February 1951; not operational, 10 February 1951 – 16 June 1952.)
- 489th Bomb Group, activated in the Air Force Reserve on 17 October 2015

Squadrons

- 99th Strategic Reconnaissance: attached 1 January – 30 September 1975
- 307th Air Refueling Squadron: attached c. 1 August – 15 September 1950 (not operational); assigned 16 June 1952 – 1 July 1953 (detached); assigned 8 November 1954 – 1 June 1960 (detached 8 November 1954 – 31 January 1955, 8 April – 21 May 1955, 2 July – 3 October 1957, c. 1 October 1958 – 9 January 1959, and c. 4 July – 5 October 1969)
- 364th Bombardment Squadron Provisional*: attached 1 July 1972 – 30 June 1975 (not operational, 1 July 1972 – c. 29 January 1973 and 9–30 June 1975)
- 365th Bombardment Squadron Provisional*: attached 1 July 1972 – 1 July 1974 (not operational, 1 July 1972 – c. 29 January 1973)
- 370th Bombardment Squadron: attached 10 February 1951 – 15 June 1952, assigned 16 June 1952 – 25 March 1965
- 371st Bombardment Squadron: attached 10 February 1951 – 15 June 1952, assigned 16 June 1952 – 25 March 1965
- 372d Bombardment Squadron: attached 10 February 1951 – 15 June 1952, assigned 16 June 1952 – 25 March 1965
- 424th Bombardment Squadron: 1 September 1958 – 1 January 1962
- 4180th: 1 October 1970 – 31 December 1971 (not operational)
- 4181st: 1 April 1970 – 31 March 1972 (not operational)
- 4362d Support (later, 4362d Post Attack Command Control): attached 20 July 1962 – 24 December 1964 (not operational, 20 – c. 31 July 1962)
- Young Tiger Tanker Task Force: 1 April 1970 – 1 June 1972 (Detached: 1 June 1972 – 1 July 1974; 1 July 1974 – 30 September 1975)
- Air Refueling Squadron Provisional, 901st: attached 1 July 1974 – 30 September 1975 (Note: Composed of aircraft deployed from multiple SAC wings.)

=== Stations ===
- MacDill Field (later MacDill Air Force Base), Florida, 15 August 1947 – 12 July 1948; 12 July 1948 – 14 August 1953

Operational components operated from: Kadena Air Base, Okinawa, 8 August 1950 – 9 February 1951
Operated from: Kadena Air Base, Okinawa, 10 February 1951 – 14 August 1953

- Kadena Air Base, Okinawa, 15 August 1953 – 19 November 1954;
- Lincoln Air Force Base, Nebraska, 20 November 1954 – 25 March 1965
- U-Tapao Royal Thai Navy Airfield, Thailand, 1 April 1970 – 30 September 1975
- Barksdale Air Force Base, Louisiana, 1 January 2011 – Present

=== Aircraft flown ===
- Boeing B-29 Superfortress, 1947 – 1950
- Boeing B-50 Superfortress, 1950
- Boeing B-47 Stratojet, 1955 – 1965 (EB-47, 1962–1964)
- Boeing KC-97 Stratofreighter, 1955 – 1960
- Boeing KC-135 Stratotanker, 1971 – 1972, 1974 – 1975 (RC-135, 1975)
- Boeing B-52D Stratofortress, 1970 – 1975
- Boeing B-52H 2011 – present
- Boeing B-1B Lancer, 2015 – Present

== See also ==
- List of B-47 units of the United States Air Force
- List of B-52 Units of the United States Air Force
- List of MAJCOM wings of the United States Air Force
