= Japanese destroyer Ushio =

Two Japanese warships have borne the name Ushio:

- Japanese destroyer Ushio (1905), a Kamikaze-class destroyer launched in 1905 and scrapped in 1928
- Japanese destroyer Ushio (1930), a Fubuki-class destroyer launched in 1930 and scrapped in 1948
