= Sayuri Ushio =

Japanese hairdresser, businesswoman and photographer

- Born: 3 December 1960; Hyogo, Japan
- Occupations: Hair stylist, businesswoman
- Known for: Founder of STEP BONE CUT
- Website: http://tick-tock.co.jp/

Sayuri Ushio (牛尾 早百合, Ushio Sayuri; born December 3, 1960) is a Japanese hairdresser, businesswoman and photographer. She is the inventor of "STEP BONE CUT" technology that is one of the few patent in the world as a haircut technology. She broke Japanese customs that hairdressers are less to target businesses other than visitors to hair salons. She runs a hair salon for 6 shops in Japan and one shop in New York, and she serves as the representative director of the Japan. Small Face Correcting 3D Cut Association that she launched. In addition, she is acting all over the world as a photographer.

== Person, background ==
She is from Hyogo prefecture. In addition to operating 7 beauty salons owned by herself, she is also active as a photographer. In order to give a spiritual message to the photo and create a work in its own style, she discovers female models at street corners around the world and produces all process from hair makeup to costume procurement and photography. With the art photo book "For Japanese Hairdressers" released in 13 cities in 6 countries in 2010. STEP BONE CUT technology was developed to increase the social status of hairdressers, bringing about a change in the beauty industry in Japan where there is no change and innovation does not occur.

=== Early life and education ===
She grew up in a home in which parents work, spent a girlhood like to love solitude and draw comics and imagine. She has few friends at school, and belonged to manga research group. She was immersed in the world of imagination and felt no loneliness at all. In junior high school days, she devoted herself to comics so that she posted as many as 16 pages of short story cartoons to publishers. In high school she joined the art department and because she was able to make many individual friends, she was far from comics and did not study very much too. She hoped to go to an art college or a design related school, but she entered a beauty school in a word of the teacher's "freelancer was hard.

=== First jobs ===
She got a job at a neighborhood beauty salon, cutting hair and cleaning, working long hours while living in a shared room with 4 people. She left after 5 years.

=== Independence ===
She was independent at the age of 25 years old and opened a first store. Number of clients increased in less than a year and the store management became stable. She was not good at communication, so she had problems with the relationship with the staff. Felling into a fierce self-hatred during the second store building, she fled to New York. She worked for 3 months at a salon where models and talents enter and leave, and took photography and creative work with the influence of a Jewish American photographer she met in New York. These had a great influence on Ushio's later life view. After returning home, an unexpected situation occurred that the staff was fraudulent of money. She was disgusted by business and thought about selling the store, but could not sell. After all, she left the first shop to another owner and started the second new shop with a few male staff. At the new store, she introduced an incentive system that was common in the US but had not been introduced in Japan. By pulling out the motivation of the staff with this management method, many skilled hairdressers gathered and an equal relationship with the staff was established. However, there were still some staff to quit the store. Ushio thought that it is due to lack of sufficient environment to keep growing as a company. She aimed to organize the rookie training curriculum, to make video manuals and to unify education. She reconsidered that the incentive system is not familiar in Japan, and returned it to former employment form.

== Step bone cut ==
Current mainstream cutting technology is Vidal Sassoon cut developed in the West a half century ago and followed worldwide, but it is a cutting technique suitable for Westerners who have a solid skeleton, and oriental people looked big at the head. In addition, there are drawbacks that it is difficult to handle and the tip of the hair is damaged. Then STEP BONE CUT was developed to look like a small face according to the shape of Japanese skull by the Ushio. Ushio was once aiming for a comics artist, so it is not stuck with a fixed idea. She was able to conceive from studying hairstyles that move like a comicsillustration with free thought. Although there were patents in Japan in haircuts in the past., the STEP BONE CUT was the first in the world to obtain a patent with a haircut which can be done with any hair design.

Initially, Ushio had released the technology free of charge, but she was concerned that the technology was fractionally imitated without proper transmission of true intention and lead to distrust of the technology. After further refining it, she got the patent in Japan, set up the association and opened the academy. As a result, many Japanese hairdressers were able to improve customer unit price. The step bone cut was a technique developed to fit the skeleton of the oriental people, but Ushio tried applying it to Westerners as well. The cutting technique that pulls with gravity without adding unnecessary force was said to American hairdresser as "It looks like yoga and tai chi." Then, Ushio opened the first New York store in Brooklyn District.

== Biography ==
- 1980 – Graduated from Miyauchi Gakuen at the Japan High Beauty College (currently BEAUTY ARTS KOBE).
- 1985 - TICK-TOCK Club opened.
- 1987 - Watching Cirque du Soleil in New York. She got a strong impact.
- 1990 - Acting as a photographer while doing a hairdresser at Greenwich Village in New York.
- 1999 - TICK-TOCK Delicious, TICK-TOCK Paradime opened.
- 2000 – TICK-TOCK· Communication Limited established.
- 2001 - TICK-TOCK Tor-west opened.
- 2003 - Photo exhibition in Kobe Laugha.
- 2005 - Held a solo exhibition at TICK-TOCK GALLARY BIRD.
- 2009 - A series of photos and prose for "LIVE & MOVE" (NEWS HAIR MAGAZINE) for one year.
- 2010 - Photo Studio & Art Gallery T - Labo (TICK - TOCK Design Laboratory) opened. In October, she won numerous awards in photo work which is also a life work, reconfirmed the splendor of Ushio herself, a Japanese hairdresser. She was imprisoned by the impulse she wanted to convey that thought and published the ART BOOK "FOR JAPANESE HAIR DRESSERS" at the same time in France and USA. Talk seminar & photo exhibition in Kinokuniya, New York.
- 2011 - STEP BONE CUT ACADEMY opened.
- 2013 – Got a Japanese patent with step bone cut.
- 2016 – In January, STEP BONE CUT NY Inc. established. In march, served as a seminar lecturer at International Beauty Show New York. In Jun, STEP BONE CUT Brooklyn ACADEMY opened. In the same month, she served as a seminar lecturer at International Beauty Show Las Vegas.
- 2017 - TICK-TOCK MORGAN opened.
- 2018 - The publication of a new work was decided from Jiyukokumin-sha.

([6][14])

== Awards history ==
- 2000 - TADA PHOTO COLLECTION 2000 Grand Prix. JHA 2000 (Japan Hair Dresser Award) Kansai Area Finalist.
- 2001 - JHA 2001 Rising Star Finalist. Milbon Photo Collection 2001 "Cover Award", "Designer Award" received 2 categories.
- 2003 - ARIMINO Photo Collection 2003 Final nomination. JHA 2003 Kinki area finalists.
- 2005 - ARIMINO Photo Collection 2005 Final nomination.

== Writings ==
- Photograph and prose are serialized for "LIVE & MOVE" (NEWS HAIR MAGAZINE) for one year (2009).
- "ART PHOTO BOOK" For Japanese Hair Dressers "(2010)
- "Jinsei wo kaeru kami no maho"(2018 Jiyukokuminsha)
