= 307th Operations Group =

US Air Force Reserve unit

307th Operations Group

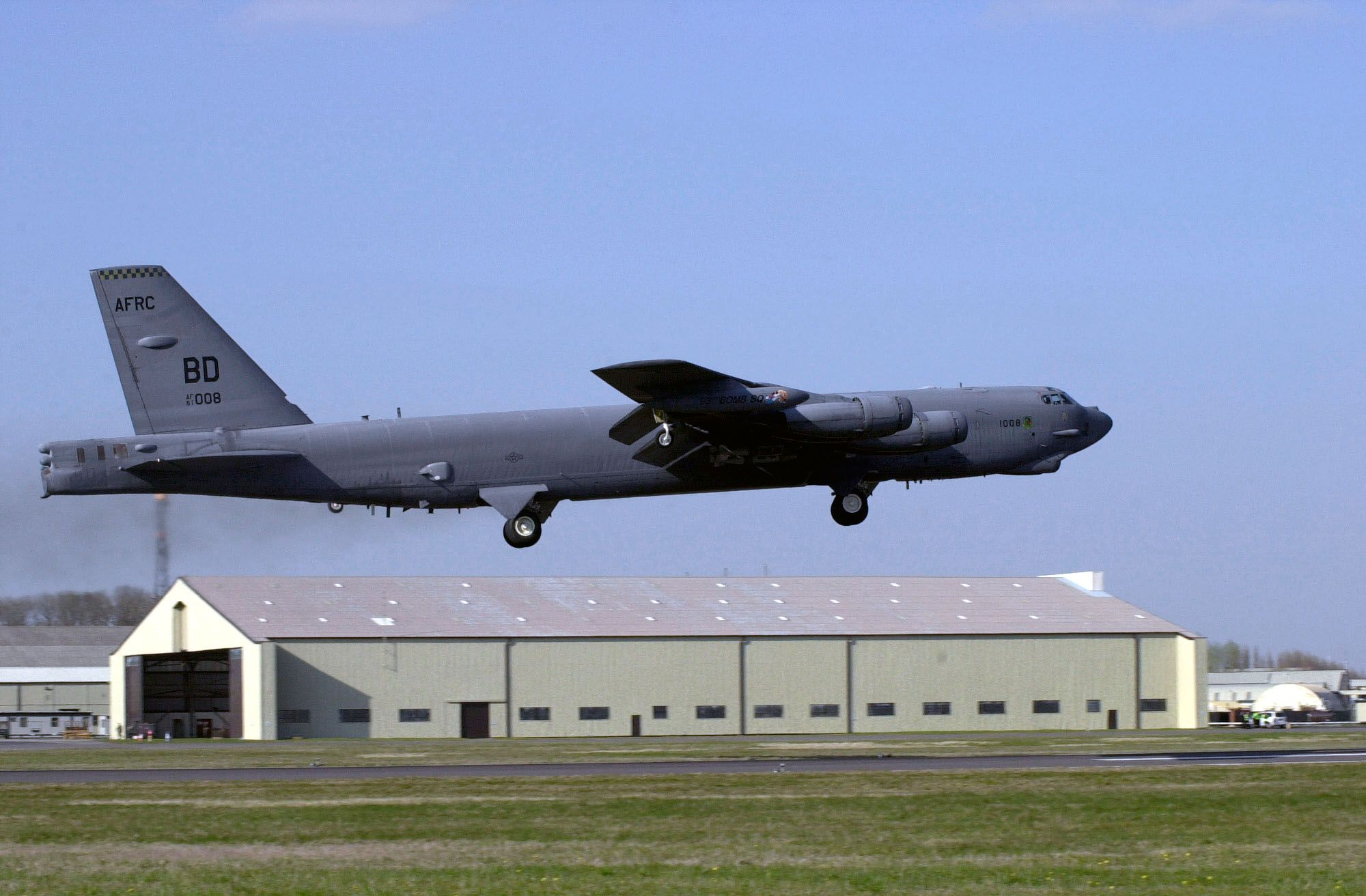
- 307th Operations Group B-52H Stratofortress taking off from RAF Fairford
- Active: 1942–1946; 1946–1952; 1977–1983; 2011–present
- Country: United States
- Branch: United States Air Force
- Type: Group
- Role: Heavy Bomber
- Part of: Air Force Reserve Command
- Garrison/HQ: Barksdale Air Force Base, Louisiana
- Nickname: The Long Rangers (World War II)
- Engagements: Southwest Pacific Theater; Korean War
- Decorations: Distinguished Unit Citation; Air Force Outstanding Unit Award; Philippine Presidential Unit Citation; Korean Presidential Unit Citation

Insignia
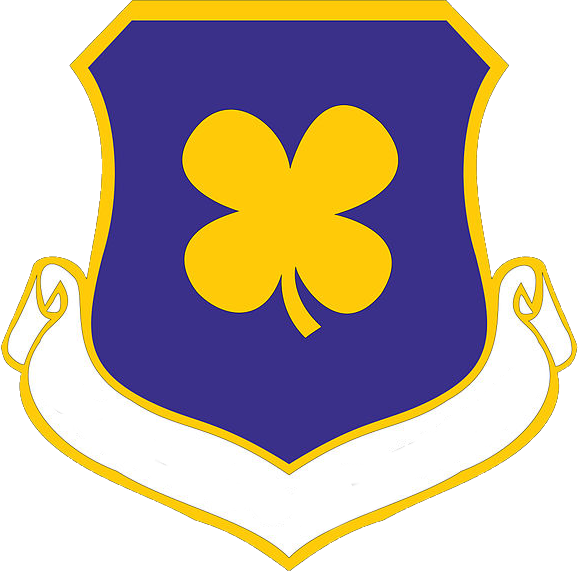
- 307th Bomb Wing emblem (Note: The 307th Wing adopted the group's emblem on 23 December 1952, placed on an Air Force shield. Ravenstein, p. 156. The 307th Group uses the wing emblem with the group designation on the scroll while assigned to the wing. Robertson, Factsheet, 307th Operations Group.)

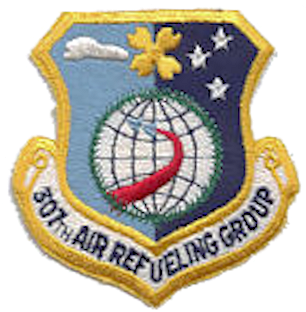
- Patch with 307th Air Refueling Group emblem

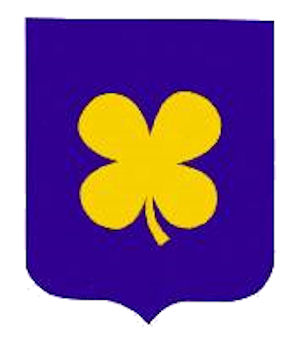
- 307th Bombardment Group emblem (Note: Approved 21 December 1942. Description: Azure, a four-petalled dogwood bloom slipped or.)
- Tail code: BD

Aircraft flown
- Bomber: B-52H Stratofortress

The 307th Operations Group is an Air Reserve Component of the United States Air Force. It is assigned to the 307th Bomb Wing, Air Force Reserve Command, stationed at Barksdale Air Force Base, Louisiana.

In the postwar era, the 307th Bombardment Group was one of the USAAF bombardment groups assigned to Strategic Air Command on 4 August 1946, the group being activated to replace the 498th Bombardment Group due to the Air Force's policy of retaining only low-numbered groups on active duty after the war. The group deployed to Okinawa during the Korean War and was awarded the Republic of Korea Presidential Unit Citation for its air strikes against enemy forces in Korea. It was also awarded the Distinguished Unit Citation and several campaign streamers.

== Mission ==
The 307th Operations Group was activated on 8 January 2011. Its mission is strategic nuclear deterrence and global strike.

The Air Force Reserve wing is a Boeing B-52 Stratofortress unit whose mission is to train B-52 pilots in initial qualification. The B-52 combat mission is to employ the bomber in support of Air Force worldwide conventional commitments.

== History ==
=== World War II ===
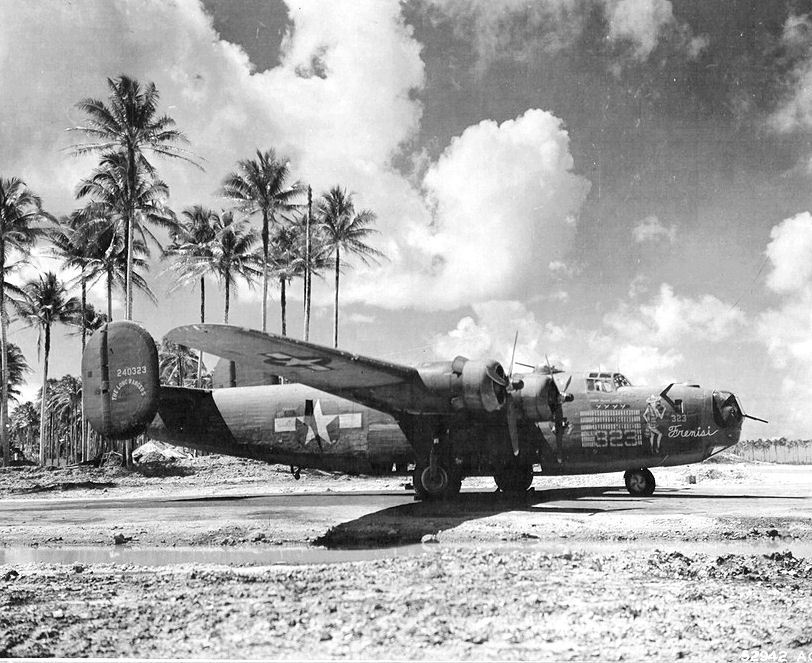
424th Bombardment Squadron B-24, "Frenisi" at Wakde Airfield (Note: Aircraft is Consolidated B-24D-50-CO, serial 42-40323. This plane flew 104 combat missions in the Pacific. Photo taken 8 September 1944.)

Activated on 15 April 1942. Trained and flew patrols off the West Coast, first in Boeing B-17 Flying Fortresses and later in Consolidated B-24 Liberators. Moved to Hawaii, October–November 1942, and assigned to Seventh Air Force. Trained and flew patrol and search missions. Attacked Wake Island, December 1942 – January 1943, by staging through Midway Island.

Moved to Guadalcanal in February 1943 and assigned to Thirteenth Air Force. Served in combat, primarily in the South and Southwest Pacific, until the war ended. Attacked Japanese airfields, installations, and shipping in the Solomon Islands and Bismarck Islands. Helped to neutralize enemy bases on Yap and in the Truk and Palau Islands. Received a Distinguished Unit Citation for an unescorted, daylight attack on heavily defended airfields in the Truk Islands on 29 March 1944. Supported operations in the Philippines by striking Japanese shipping in the southern Philippines and by bombing airfields on Leyte, Luzon, Negros, Ceram, and Halmahera. Also took part in Allied air operations against the Netherlands East Indies by hitting airfields, shipping, and installations.

Received a Distinguished Unit Citation for an unescorted mission against vital oil refineries at Balikpapan, Borneo, on 3 October 1944. Supported Australian forces on Borneo and bombed targets in French Indochina during the last three months of the war.

Two Distinguished Unit Citations were awarded to the group during World War II, one for action in the bombing of the Island of Truk, the most heavily defended and strongly fortified Japanese base in the Pacific. During withdrawal. gunners of the Group destroyed 31 of the 75 attacking aircraft, probably destroyed 12 more and damaged 10 in an air battle that lasted 43 minutes. This daring raid, made on 29 March 1944, neutralized the Japanese airfields, making possible long range flights without fighter protection, The other Presidential Unit Citation was awarded for the successful strike at the Baltkapapan Oil Refineries in Borneo on 30 September 1944. The 307th had to fly their B-24 Liberator bombers 17 1/2 hours for a round trip of 2,610 miles, the longest mass daylight mission ever flown by this type aircraft.

Flew patrol missions along the Asiatic mainland and ferried liberated prisoners from Okinawa to Manila after V-J Day. Returned to the US, December 1945 – January 1946. Inactivated on 18 January 1946.

=== Strategic Air Command ===
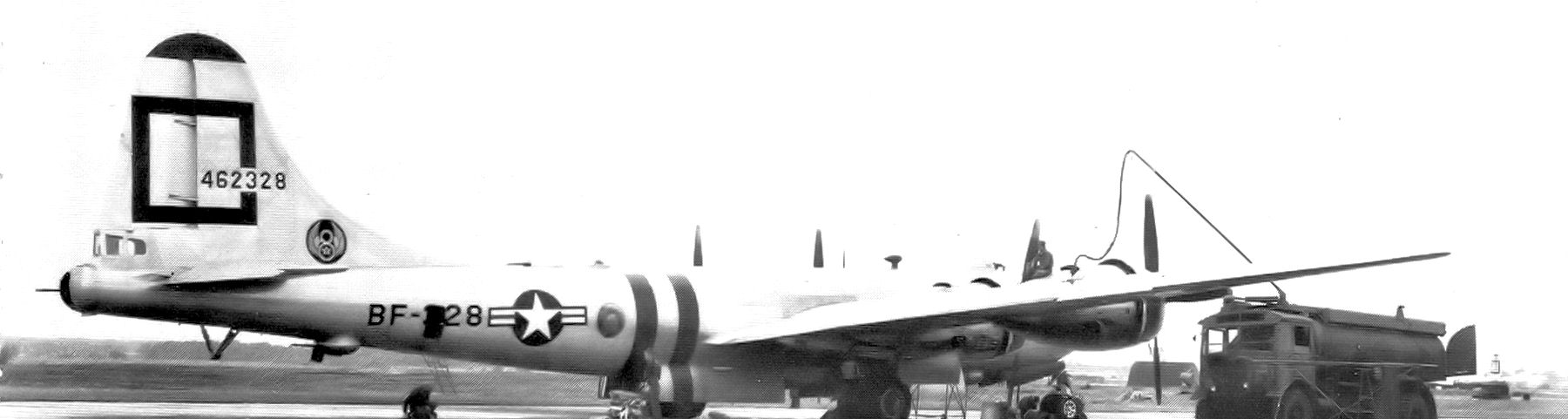
307th B-29 during the Berlin Airlift (Note: Aircraft is Boeing B-29A-75-BN Superfortress, serial 44-62328 at RAF Lakenheath in 1948.)

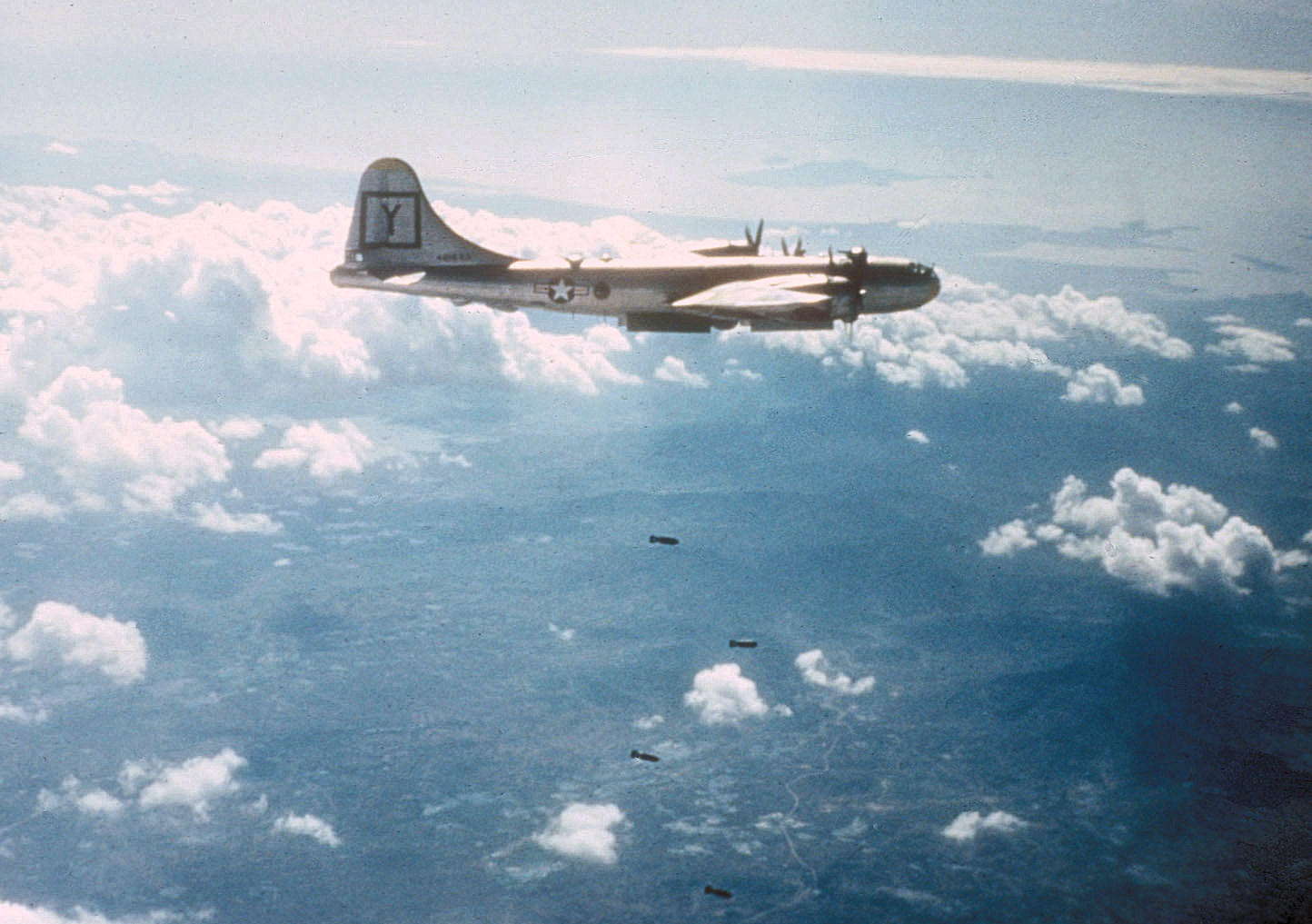
A 307th Bomb Group B-29 bombing a target in Korea, c. 1951.

Redesignated 307th Bombardment Group (Very Heavy). Activated on 4 August 1946 from the personnel and equipment of the 498th Bombardment Group. Assigned to Strategic Air Command at MacDill Air Force Base, Florida. Equipped with Boeing B-29 Superfortresses. Trained and developed antisubmarine tactics. Redesignated 307th Bombardment Group, Medium in May 1948.

It deployed from MacDill on 1 August 1950 to Kadena Air Base on Okinawa for combat during the Korean War. The 307th was the third Strategic Air Command B-29 Superfortress group deployed, and was attached to Far East Air Forces. Attacked strategic objectives in North Korea, August–September 1950. After that, struck interdictory targets, including communications and supply centers, and supported UN ground forces by hitting gun emplacements and troop concentrations. During its combat deployment, the group had flown over 5800 sorties. Twenty-two planes were reported lost.

Became non-operational when parent wing adopted Dual Deputate organization, 10 February 1951 and all assigned squadrons were attached directly to the wing. Inactivated 16 June 1952

Reactivated in 1977 as a Boeing KC-135 Stratotanker air refueling group at Travis Air Force Base, California. Inactivated in 1983 due to a SAC reorganization.

== Lineage ==
- Constituted as the 307th Bombardment Group (Heavy) on 28 January 1942

Activated on 15 April 1942
Redesignated 307th Bombardment Group, Heavy on 20 August 1943
Inactivated on 18 January 1946

- Redesignated 307th Bombardment Group, Very Heavy on 15 July 1946

Activated on 4 August 1946
Redesignated 307th Bombardment Group, Medium on 28 May 1948
Inactivated on 16 June 1952

- Redesignated 307th Air Refueling Group on 14 June 1977
- Activated on 1 July 1977

Inactivated on 1 October 1983

- Redesignated 307th Operations Group on 8 December 2010
- Activated on 1 January 2011

=== Assignments ===
- Second Air Force, 15 April 1942
- VII Bomber Command, 1 November 1942
- XIII Bomber Command, 9 February 1943 – 15 December 1945
- Army Service Forces, San Francisco Port of Embarkation, 16–18 January 1946
- Fifteenth Air Force, 4 August 1946
- Strategic Air Command, 1 April 1947
- 307th Bombardment Wing, 15 August 1947 – 12 July 1948
- 307th Bombardment Wing, 12 July 1948 – 16 June 1952 (attached to 3d Air Division, 16 July – 3 November 1948, Far East Air Forces Bomber Command, Provisional, 8 August 1950 – 9 February 1951, not operational after 10 February 1951)
- 14th Air Division, 1 July 1977 – 1 October 1983
- 307th Bomb Wing, 1 January 2011 – present

=== Components ===
- 35th Reconnaissance Squadron (later 424th Bombardment Squadron): 15 April 1942 – December 1945
- 93d Bomb Squadron: 1 January 2011 – present
- 307th Air Refueling Squadron, 16 June 1950 – 16 June 1952 (attached to 43d Bombardment Group c. 1 Jul 1950, 43d Bombardment Wing, 10 February 1951, 6th Bombardment Wing after August 1951)
- 307th Consolidated Aircraft Maintenance Squadron; 1 July 1977 – 31 December 1983
- 307th Operations Support Flight (later 307th Operations Support Squadron): 1 January 2011 – present
- 343d Bomb Squadron: 1 January 2011 – present
- 370th Bombardment Squadron: 15 April 1942 – 8 January 1946; 4 August 1946 – 16 June 1952 (attached to 307th Bombardment Wing after 10 February 1951)
- 371st Bombardment Squadron: 15 April 1942 – 8 January 1946; 4 August 1946 – 16 June 1952 (attached to 307th Bombardment Wing after 10 February 1951)
- 372d Bombardment Squadron: 15 April 1942 – December 1945; 4 August 1946 – 16 June 1952 (attached to 307th Bombardment Wing after 10 February 1951)
- 424th Bombardment Squadron: See 35th Reconnaissance Squadron
- 916th Air Refueling Squadron: 1 July 1977 – 31 December 1983

=== Stations ===
- Geiger Field, Washington, 15 April 1942
- Ephrata Army Air Base, Washington 28 May 1942
- Sioux City Army Air Base, Iowa, 30 September – 20 October 1942
- Hickam Field, Hawaii, 1 November 1942
- Koli Airfield, Guadalcanal, Solomon Islands, February 1943
- Munda Airfield, New Georgia, Solomon Islands, 28 January 1944
- Momote Airfield, Los Negros, Admiralty Islands, C. 29 April 1944
- Wakde Airfield, Wakde, Netherlands East Indies, 24 August 1944
- Wama Airfield, Morotai, Netherlands East Indies, c. 18 October 1944
- Clark Field, Luzon, Philippines, September–December 1945
- Camp Stoneman, California, 16–18 January 1946
- MacDill Field (Later MacDill Air Force Base), Florida, 4 August 1946 – 16 June 1952 (deployed at RAF Waddington and RAF Marham, England, 18 July – 3 November 1948, elements at RAF Lakenheath and RAF Marham, England, 17 February – 1 May 1949, deployed to Kadena Air Base, Okinawa after 8 August 1950)

Operated from Kadena Air Base, Okinawa, 8 August 1950 – 9 February 1951

- Travis Air Force Base, California, 1 July 1977 – 31 December 1983
- Barksdale Air Force Base, Louisiana, 8 January 2011 – present

=== Aircraft ===
- Boeing B-17 Flying Fortress, 1942
- Consolidated B-24 Liberator, 1942–1946
- Boeing B-29 Superfortress, 1946–1951
- Boeing KC-135 Stratotanker, 1977–1983
- Boeing B-52 Stratofortress, 2011–present
