= 873rd Tactical Missile Squadron =

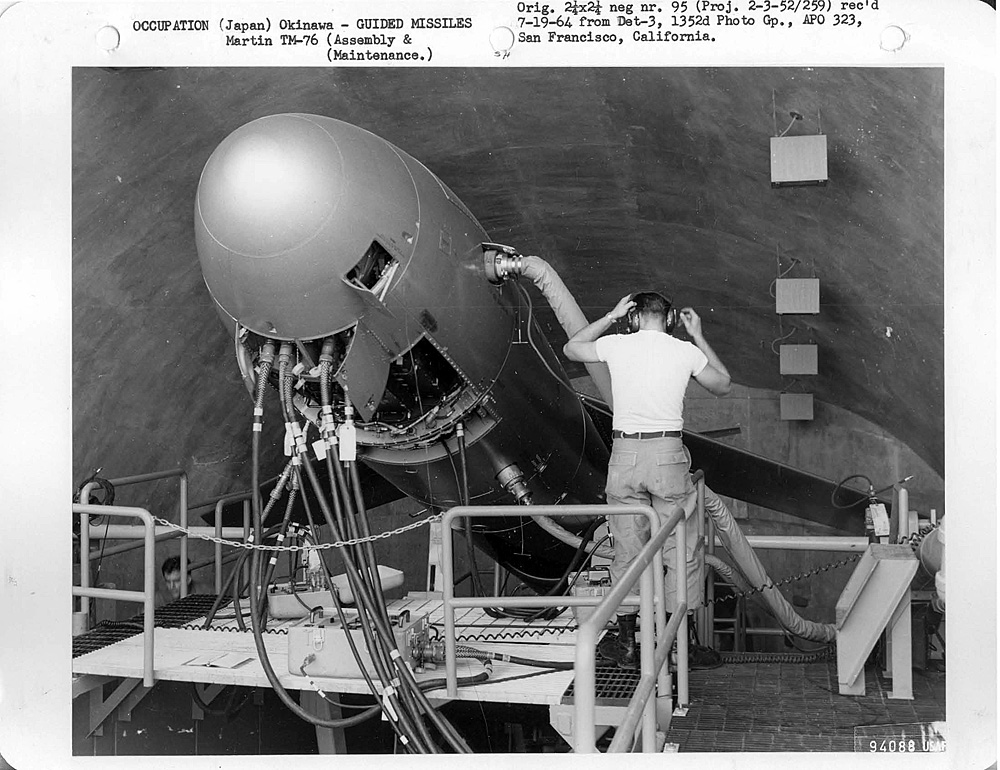
- TM-76 Mace of the 873rd Tactical Missile Squadron
- Active: 1943–1946; 1961–1965
- Country: United States
- Branch: United States Air Force
- Role: Cruise missile
- Engagements: Pacific Theater
- Decorations: Distinguished Unit Citation; Air Force Outstanding Unit Award

Insignia
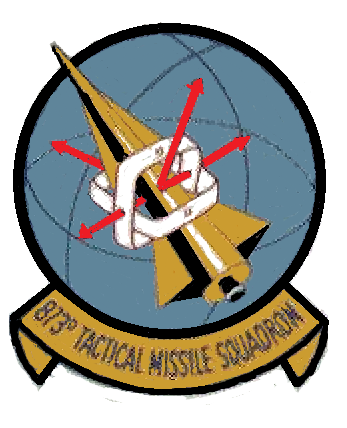
- 873rd Tactical Missile Squadron emblem (Note: Approved 11 September 1962. Description: On and over a medium blue globe, grid lines Air Force blue, a stylized missile bendwise its nose pointing upward and extending beyond the globe, Air Force golden yellow, shaded Air Force blue; the missile passing through a white gimbal fimbriated red; radiating from the common center of the earth, missile and gimbal, four red arrows; flanking the nose of the missile, four white stars two on either side; outlines and details Air Force blue throughout.)

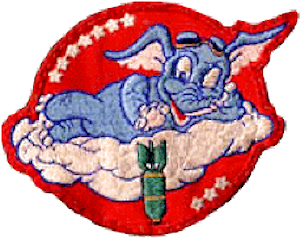
- Patch with 873rd Bombardment Squadron emblem

The 873rd Tactical Missile Squadron is an inactive United States Air Force unit. Its last assignment was with 498th Tactical Missile Group at Kadena Air Base, Okinawa. The squadron was first activated in 1943 for service during World War II as the 873rd Bombardment Squadron. After training in the United States with Boeing B-29 Superfortress bombers, the squadron moved to the Mariana Islands, where it participated in the strategic bombing campaign against Japan, earning two Distinguished Unit Citations before the end of hostilities in August 1945. The squadron returned to the United States in December 1945 and was inactivated in March 1946, and its personnel and equipment transferred to another organization.

The 873rd was activated again at Kadena in 1961, and became the first Air Force unit to operate the TM-76B Mace cruise missile before inactivating in 1965.

== History ==
=== B-29 Superfortress operations against Japan ===
The squadron was first activated at Clovis Army Air Field, New Mexico in November 1943 as one of the four original squadrons of the 498th Bombardment Group, an early Boeing B-29 Superfortress very heavy bomber squadrons. The squadron trained in New Mexico and at Great Bend Army Air Field, Kansas with early model B-29s until July 1944, when it began its deployment to the Pacific.

The squadron arrived at its combat station, Isely Field, Saipan in September 1944. The squadron's first missions were flown against targets on Iwo Jima and Truk Island. On 24 November 1944, the squadron participated in the first raid on Japan by bombers based in the Mariana Islands. The squadron initially engaged in high altitude daylight attacks against industrial targets in Japan, It was awarded a Distinguished Unit Citation (DUC) for an attack on an aircraft manufacturing plant in Nagoya on 13 December 1944.

In March 1945, the tactics of Twentieth Air Force changed and the squadron began flying low level night attacks with incendiaries against area targets. The 873rd received a second DUC for its actions during a low level raid on urban industries near Kobe and Osaka in June 1945. Squadron operations also included attacks on airfields in Okinawa during the invasion of Okinawa in April 1945. After V-J Day, the squadron remained on Saipan until November and reassembled at March Field, California the following month. It became one of the first bombardment units in Strategic Air Command in March 1946, but was inactivated on 4 August and its personnel and equipment were transferred to the 370th Bombardment Squadron, which was simultaneously activated.

=== Tactical missile operations ===
The squadron was redesignated the 873rd Tactical Missile Squadron and reactivated in 1961 as a TM-76 Mace surface to surface missile squadron at Kadena Air Base Okinawa in February 1961. However, it was not until early in 1962 that the squadron's first launch site at Bolo Point became operational. Early arrivals to the squadron assisted contractor personnel in making the launch sites operational. Other launch sites were at Onna Point, White Beach, and in Kin just north of Camp Hansen, although once all four sites were operational they were split with the 874th Tactical Missile Squadron. The squadron was equipped with the B model of the Mace, which was deployed so that a single crew was able to launch all missiles located at a single launch site directly from the underground bunkers in which they were stored. The 873rd was the first squadron equipped with the TM-76B, which used an inertial guidance system.

During the Cuban Missile Crisis, the squadron was placed on high alert status. Missile down time for routine maintenance was not permitted, and when a malfunction required taking a missile off alert, its planned target had to be covered by placing a Republic F-105 Thunderchief on cockpit alert at the end of Kadena's runway. The 873rd was inactivated in July 1965 and remaining Mace operations were transferred directly to the 498th Group, which remained active until 1969. One of the dismantled Mace sites now houses a Buddhist training center for Soka Gakkai International. The facility is now known as the "Fortress of Peace" and houses two museums including one devoted to the nuclear weapons once based on Okinawa.

== Lineage ==
- Constituted as the 873rd Bombardment Squadron, Very Heavy on 19 November 1943

Activated on 20 November 1943
Inactivated on 4 August 1946

- Redesignated 873rd Tactical Missile Squadron and activated on 16 September 1960 (not organized)

Organized on 8 February 1961
Inactivated on 8 July 1965

=== Assignments ===
- 498th Bombardment Group, 20 November 1943 – 4 August 1946
- Pacific Air Forces, 25 April 1961 (not organized)
- 498th Tactical Missile Group, 8 February 1961 – 8 July 1965

=== Stations ===
- Clovis Army Air Field, New Mexico, 20 November 1943
- Great Bend Army Air Field, Kansas, 13 April – 16 July 1944
- Isely Field, Saipan, 7 September 1944 – 1 November 1945
- March Field, California, c. 7 December 1945
- MacDill Field, Florida, 5 January – 4 August 1946
- Kadena Air Base, Okinawa, 8 February 1961 – 8 July 1965

=== Aircraft and missiles ===
- Boeing B-17 Flying Fortress, 1944
- Boeing B-29 Superfortress, 1944–1946
- Martin TM-76B (later MGM-13C, CGM-13C) Mace, 1961–1965

=== Awards and campaigns ===
Award streamer	Award	Dates	Notes
	Distinguished Unit Citation	13 December 1944	Japan, 873rd Bombardment Squadron
	Distinguished Unit Citation	1–7 June 1945	Japan, 873rd Bombardment Squadron
	Air Force Outstanding Unit Award	8 February 1961 – 29 May 1963	873rd Tactical Missile Squadron

Campaign Streamer	Campaign	Dates	Notes
	Air Offensive, Japan	7 September 1944 – 2 September 1945	873rd Bombardment Squadron
	Eastern Mandates	7 September 1944 – 14 April 1944	873rd Bombardment Squadron
	Western Pacific	17 April 1945 – 2 September 1945	873rd Bombardment Squadron

== See also ==
- B-17 Flying Fortress units of the United States Army Air Forces
- List of B-29 Superfortress operators
- List of United States Air Force missile squadrons
