= 371st Bombardment Squadron =

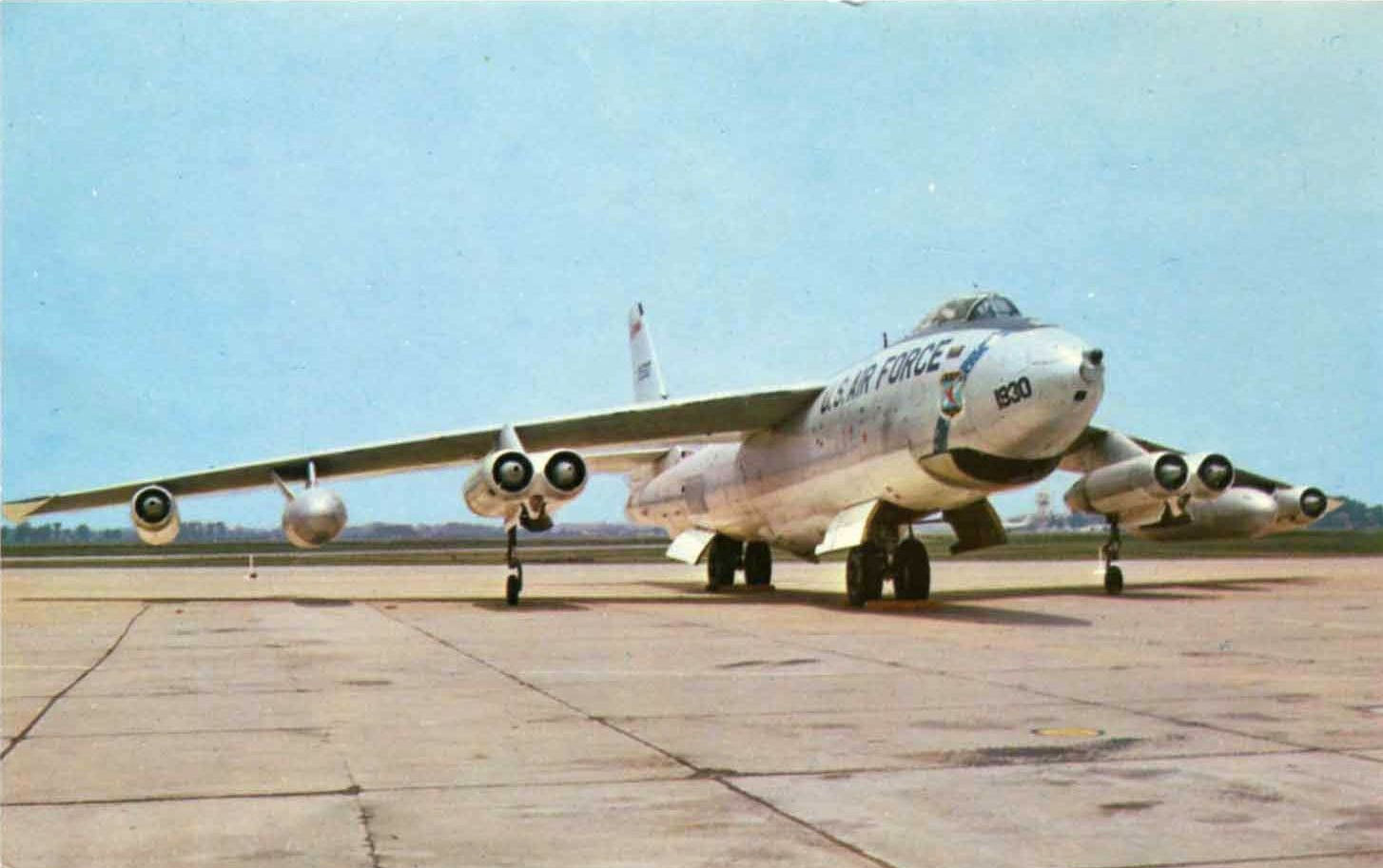
- B-47 Stratojet as flown by the squadron (Note: Aircraft is Lockheed Aircraft built Boeing B-47E-55-LM Stratojet, serial 53-1830, taken at Langley AFB. This plane was sent to the Military Aircraft Storage and Disposition Center on 18 January 1963 and scrapped on 30 October 1967. Baugher, Joe (5 August 2023). "1953 USAF Serial Numbers". Joe Baugher.)
- Active: 1942–1946; 1946–1965
- Country: United States
- Branch: United States Air Force
- Role: Medium bomber
- Engagements: Southwest Pacific Theater
- Decorations: Distinguished Unit Citation; Philippine Presidential Unit Citation; Republic of Korea Presidential Unit Citation

Insignia
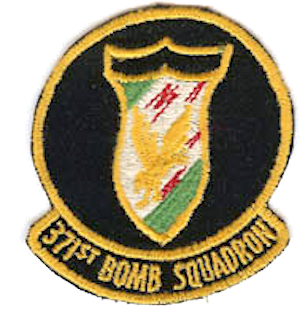
- Patch with 371st Bombardment Squadron emblem (Note: Approved 4 September 1956. Description: On a disc sable bordered or, a shield vert with a chief sable, chief and shield edged or on a wide sinister bend argent, an eagle or, talon and beak gules soaring downward to the dexter, trailing power streams gules.)

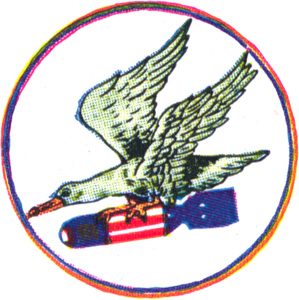
- 371st Bombardment Squadron emblem (World War II)

The 371st Bombardment Squadron is an inactive United States Air Force unit. Its last assignment was with the 307th Bombardment Wing at Lincoln Air Force Base, Nebraska, where it was inactivated on 25 March 1965.

The squadron was first activated in April 1942 as one of the original four squadrons of the 307th Bombardment Group. After training in the United States, it deployed to the Pacific, serving mainly in the Southwest Pacific Theater. The squadron earned two Distinguished Unit Citations for its actions in combat. Following V-J Day, it returned to the United States for inactivation.

The squadron was reactivated as a Strategic Air Command (SAC) bomber squadron in 1946. During the Korean War, it deployed to Okinawa and engaged in combat missions under the control of Far East Air Forces. Following the end of hostilities in Korea, it returned to the United States, converting to Boeing B-47 Stratojets. It flew the Stratojet until it was inactivated in 1965 as that plane was withdrawn from the SAC inventory.

== History ==
=== World War II ===
The squadron was activated at Geiger Field, Washington on 15 April 1942 as the 371st Bombardment Squadron, one of the original four squadrons of the 307th Bombardment Group. The squadron drew its initial cadre from the 353d Bombardment Squadron. It was first equipped with Boeing B-17 Flying Fortresses, but while still in training converted to Consolidated B-24 Liberators. In addition to training with these heavy bombers, it also flew some antisubmarine patrols off the Pacific northwest coast. In October 1942, it began its movement to Hawaii. The ground echelon sailed from San Francisco on the MS Torrens, while the air echelon ferried the squadron's Liberators to Hawaii.

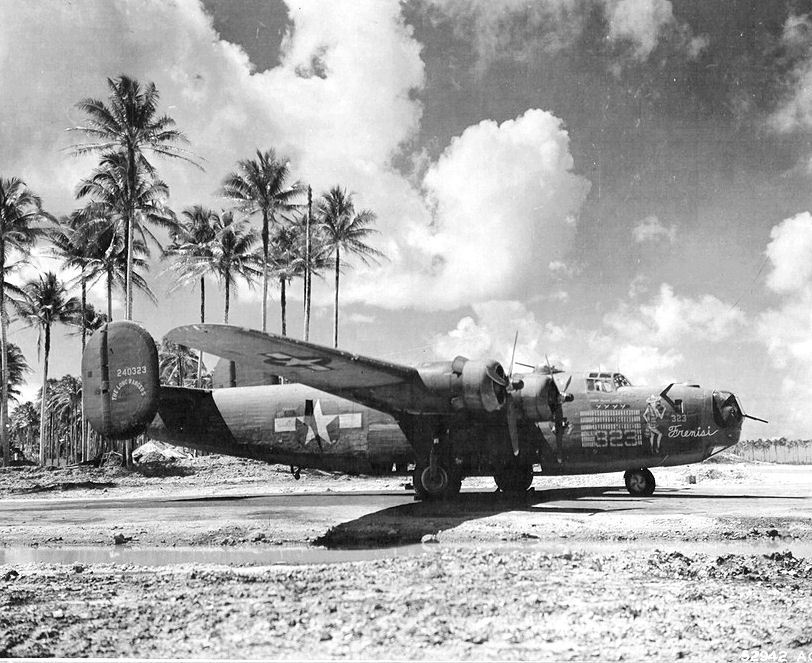
B-24D Frenisi at Wakde Airfield (Note: Aircraft is Consolidated B-24D-50-CO, serial 42-40323. This aircraft flew 104 combat missions in the Pacific. Photo taken: 8 September 1944, Wakde Airfield, Netherlands East Indies. It was condemned on 31 October 1944. Baugher, Joe (7 September 2023). "1942 USAF Serial Numbers". Joe Baugher.)

The squadron arrived at Wheeler Field, Hawaii in November 1942, continuing its training in the Liberator and flying search and antisubmarine patrols in defense of Hawaii as part of Seventh Air Force. In December 1942, it staged through Naval Air Station Midway to attack Wake Island.

In February 1943, the squadron was relieved from assignment to Seventh Air Force and began to operate under the control of Thirteenth Air Force, although it did not move forward to Luganville Airfield, Espiritu Santo, New Hebrides, until June. From Guadalcanal, it struck enemy airfields and military installations along with shipping in the Solomon Islands and Bismarck Archipelago. It helped neutralize enemy bases in Yap, Truk and Palau. On 29 March 1944, the squadron made an unescorted daylight attack on heavily defended airfields in the Truk Islands for which it was awarded a Distinguished Unit Citation (DUC).

As American forces moved forward, it supported operations in the Philippines by strikes against enemy shipping in the southern Philippines and striking airfields on Leyte, Luzon, Negros, Ceram and Halmahera and supported Allied operations in the Netherlands East Indies. It flew an unescorted mission attacking the oil refineries at Balikpapan on Borneo on 3 October 1944, for which it was awarded a second DUC.

In the closing months of the war in the Pacific, it supported Australian forces on Borneo and attacked targets in Indochina. After V-J Day, it ferried liberated prisoners from Okinawa to the Philippines and flew patrols along the coast of China. It moved to Clark Field in the Philippines in September 1945 and returned to the United States for inactivation at the Port of Embarkation in January 1946.

=== Strategic Air Command ===
The squadron was reactivated at MacDill Field, Florida in August 1946, when it assumed the personnel and Boeing B-29 Superfortresses of the 874th Bombardment Squadron, which was simultaneously inactivated. Starting in September 1947, the squadron trained other Strategic Air Command (SAC) units for antisubmarine warfare.

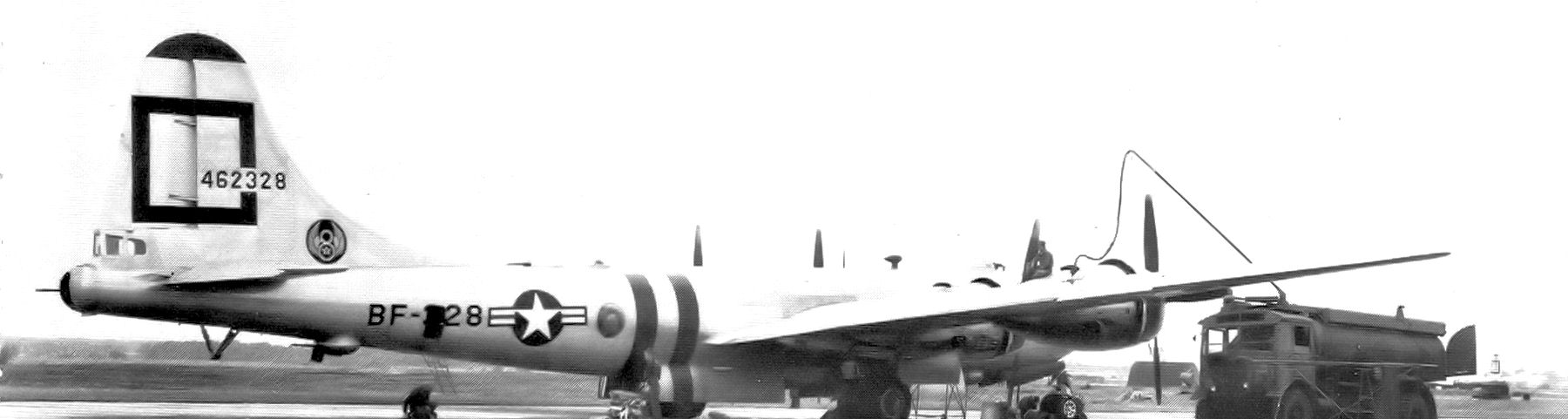
307th Bombardment Group B-29 deployed to England during the Berlin Airlift (Note: Aircraft is Boeing B-29A-75-BN Superfortress, serial 44-62328. This was the last B-29 delivered to the Army Air Forces. Dirkx, Marco (21 June 2024). "1944 USAF Serial Numbers". Joe Baugher’s Serial Number List.)

In the summer of 1948, SAC placed the squadron on three hour alert for deployment to Europe during the Berlin Airlift. on 18 July, the squadron deployed to RAF Marham, remaining there until October, when it was replaced by elements of the 97th Bombardment Group Starting in February 1949, it conducted transition training for SAC B-29 aircrews.

==== Korean War ====
Following the North Korean invasion of South Korea, the squadron deployed to Kadena Air Base, Okinawa in August 1950. The squadron began operations against North Korea on 8 August. For the following two months, the squadron concentrated its attacks on enemy transportation systems and industrial facilities. In November 1950, it carried out a concentrated attack on bridges over the Yalu River between Korea and Manchuria. It then concentrated on interdiction targets and air support of United Nations ground forces. On 10 February 1951, the 307th Bombardment Wing deployed to Kadena and absorbed the resources of the 307th Bombardment Group, including direct control of the squadron. The 307th Group existed as a "paper" unit until June 1952, when the squadron was assigned directly to the wing. On 23 May 1951, the squadron participated in a nighttime close air support effort, destroying enemy positions along the entire battlefront with radar-aimed fragmentation bombs. Until the end of the war, it continued attacks against industrial targets, bridges, troop concentrations, airfields, supply dumps, rail yards, enemy frontline positions, and lines of communication. By late 1952, the squadron flew short-range night missions, concentrating on enemy airfields and dams. As the truce talks neared their conclusion in July 1953, the squadron helped spoil a last minute enemy ground offensive, which earned it another DUC.

In August 1953 the squadron's assignment at Kadena was made permanent. It remained in Okinawa until November 1954 when the squadron returned to the United States.

==== Return to the United States ====
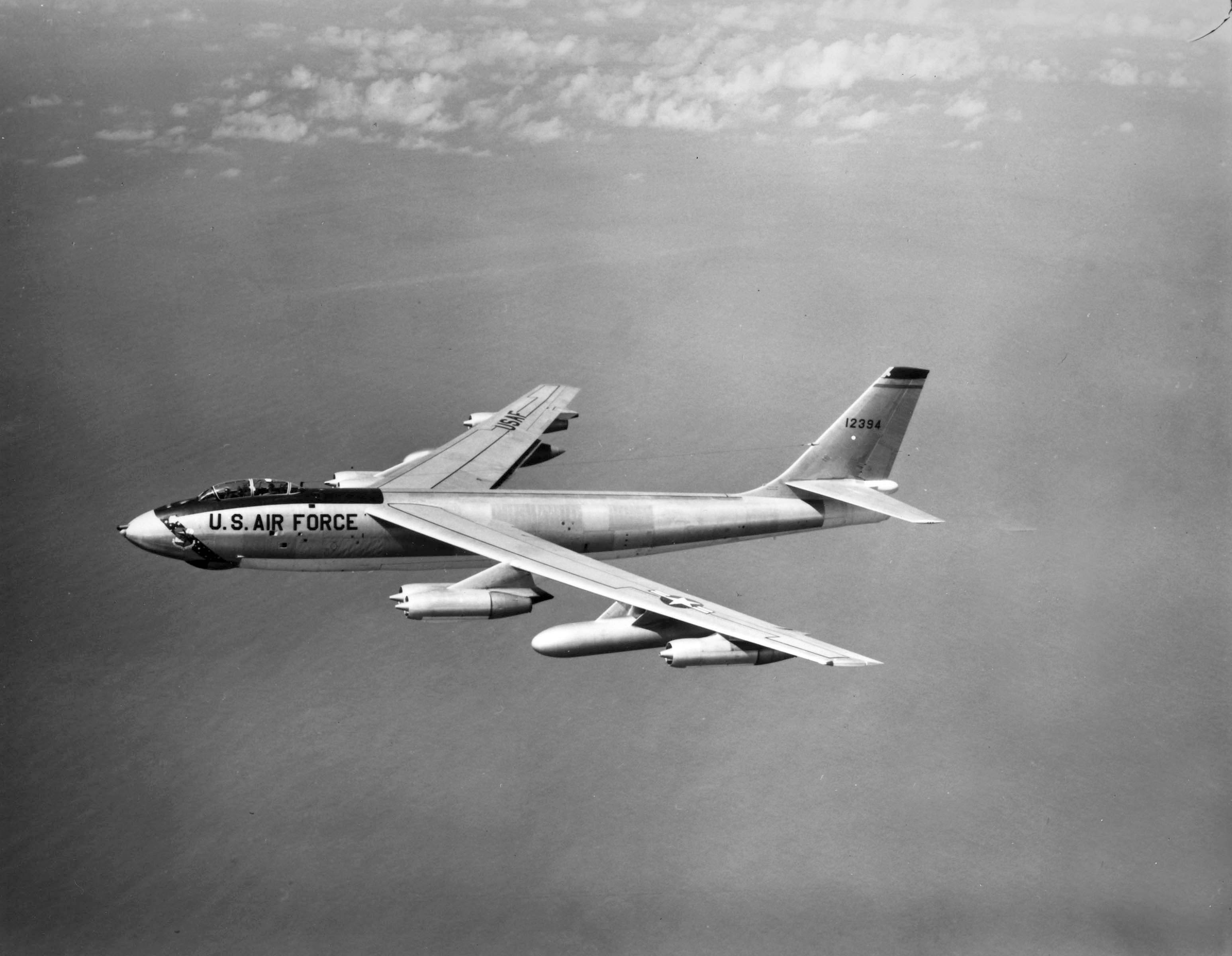
B-47E Stratojet as flown by the 371st at Lincoln AFB (Note: Aircraft is Boeing B-47E-55-BW Stratojet, serial 51-2394. In March 1960, it was modified as an NB-47E. Dirkx, Marco (21 July 2025). "1951 USAF Serial Numbers". Joe Baugher’s Serial Number List.)

The squadron ferried its B-29s back to the United States for storage at Davis-Monthan Air Force Base, then reformed at Lincoln Air Force Base, Nebraska in 1955 as a Boeing B-47 Stratojet medium jet bomber squadron.

From July to October 1956, the squadron deployed to RAF Lakenheath. Operation Reflex alert operations began for B-47s on 1 October 1957. Reflex placed Stratojets and Boeing KC-97 Stratofreighters at bases closer to the Soviet Union for 90 day periods, although individuals rotated back to home bases during unit Reflex deployments. From 1958, SAC's B-47 squadrons began to assume an alert posture at their home bases, reducing the amount of time spent on alert at overseas bases. General Thomas S. Power set an initial goal of maintaining one third of SAC’s planes on fifteen minute ground alert, fully fueled and ready for combat to reduce vulnerability to a Soviet missile strike.

During the 1958 Lebanon Crisis, the United States deployed tactical forces in Operation Blue Bat. Meanwhile, in a show of force, SAC brought additional bombers to an increased alert status for five days in July. The squadron's alert commitment was increased to half the squadron's aircraft in 1962.

On 22 October 1962, soon after the detection of Soviet missiles in Cuba, SAC began to disperse its B-47 force. Dispersing bombers carried nuclear weapons in ferrying configuration. On 24 October SAC went to DEFCON 2, placing all squadron aircraft on alert. On 27 November SAC returned to normal alert posture and began the return of squadron planes to Lincoln. With the phaseout of B-47 in 1965 the 371st was inactivated.

== Lineage ==
- Constituted as the 371st Bombardment Squadron (Heavy) on 28 January 1942

Activated on 15 April 1942
Redesignated 371st Bombardment Squadron, Heavy c. March 1944
Inactivated on 18 January 1946
Redesignated 371st Bombardment Squadron, Very Heavy on 15 July 1946
Activated on 4 August 1946
Redesignated 371st Bombardment Squadron, Medium on 28 May 1948
Inactivated on 25 March 1965

=== Assignments ===
- 307th Bombardment Group, 15 April 1942 – 18 January 1946
- 307th Bombardment Group, 4 August 1946 (attached to 307th Bombardment Wing after 14 February 1951)
- 307th Bombardment Wing, 16 June 1952 – 25 March 1965

=== Stations ===
- Geiger Field, Washington, 15 April 1942
- Ephrata Army Air Base, Washington, 28 May 1942
- Sioux City Army Air Base, Iowa, 30 September – 20 October 1942
- Wheeler Field, Hawaii, 2 November 1942 (operated from Henderson Field, Midway Atoll, 21–24 December 1942 and 20–25 January 1943; Canton Island Airfield, Phoenix Islands, 6–12 February 1943: Funafuti Airfield, Nanumea, Gilbert Islands, 18–23 April 1943 and 27 July – 1 August 1943)
- Luganville Airfield, Espiritu Santo, New Hebrides, 13 June 1943 (operated from Henderson Field, Guadalcanal, 25 August – 14 October 1943; 24 November – 31 December 1943
- Munda Airfield, New Georgia, Solomon Islands, 9 January 1944
- Momote Airfield, Los Negros, Admiralty Islands, 13 May 1944
- Wakde Airfield, Netherlands East Indies, 22 August 1944 (operated from Kornasoren (Yebrurro) Airfield, Noemfoor, Schouten Islands, c. 18 September – c. 20 November 1944)
- Wama Airfield, Morotai, Netherlands East Indies, 10 November 1944
- Clark Field, Luzon, Philippines, 1 September – 27 December 1945
- Camp Stoneman, California, 16–18 January 1946
- MacDill Field (later MacDill Air Force Base), Florida, 4 August 1946 ((deployed to RAF Marham 18 July – 2 November 1948, operated from Kadena Air Base, Okinawa after c. 5 August 1950)
- Kadena Air Base, Okinawa, 15 August 1953
- Lincoln Air Force Base, Nebraska, 19 November 1954 – 25 March 1965

=== Aircraft ===
- Boeing B-17 Flying Fortress, 1942
- Consolidated B-24 Liberator, 1942–1945
- Boeing B-29 Superfortress, 1946–1954
- Boeing B-47 Stratojet, 1955–1965

=== Awards and campaigns ===
Award streamer	Award	Dates	Notes
	Presidential Unit Citation	29 March 1944	Truk, 371st Bombardment Squadron
	Presidential Unit Citation	3 October 1944	Borneo, 371st Bombardment Squadron
	Presidential Unit Citation	11–27 July 1953	Korea, 371st Bombardment Squadron
	Philippine Republic Presidential Unit Citation	17 October 1944–4 July 1945	371st Bombardment Squadron
	Republic of Korea Presidential Unit Citation	[August] 1950–27 July 1953	371st Bombardment Squadron

Campaign Streamer	Campaign	Dates	Notes
	Central Pacific	2 November 1942–6 December 1943	371st Bombardment Squadron
	Air Combat, Asiatic–Pacific Theater	2 November 1942-2 March 1946	371st Bombardment Squadron
	Guadalcanal	22 December 1942–21 February 1943	371st Bombardment Squadron
	New Guinea	24 January 1943–31 December 1944	371st Bombardment Squadron
	Northern Solomons	23 February 1943–21 November 1944	371st Bombardment Squadron
	Eastern Mandates	7 December 1943–14 April 1944	371st Bombardment Squadron
	Bismarck Archipelago	15 December 1943–27 November 1944	371st Bombardment Squadron
	Leyte	17 October 1944–1 July 1945	371st Bombardment Squadron
	Luzon	15 December 1944–4 July 1945	371st Bombardment Squadron
	Southern Philippines	27 February 1945–4 July 1945	371st Bombardment Squadron
	China Offensive	5 May 1945–2 September 1945	371st Bombardment Squadron
	UN Defensive	c. 4 August 1950–15 September 1950	371st Bombardment Squadron
	UN Offensive	16 September 1950–2 November 1950	371st Bombardment Squadron
	CCF Intervention	3 November 1950–24 January 1951	371st Bombardment Squadron
	1st UN Counteroffensive	25 January 1951–21 April 1951	371st Bombardment Squadron
	CCF Spring Offensive	22 April 1951–9 July 1951	371st Bombardment Squadron
	UN Summer-Fall Offensive	9 July 1951–27 November 1951	371st Bombardment Squadron
	Second Korean Winter	28 November 1951–30 April 1952	371st Bombardment Squadron
	Korea Summer-Fall 1952	1 May 1952–30 November 1952	371st Bombardment Squadron
	Third Korean Winter	1 December 1952–30 April 1953	371st Bombardment Squadron
	Korea Summer-Fall 1953	1 May 1953–27 July 1953	371st Bombardment Squadron

== See also ==
- B-17 Flying Fortress units of the United States Army Air Forces
- B-24 Liberator units of the United States Army Air Forces
- List of B-29 Superfortress operators
- List of B-47 units of the United States Air Force
