= Wakde Airfield =

Former WW2 military airfield on New Guinea, Indonesia

- Part of Fifth Air Force
- Wakde Island, Papua, Indonesia
- Location in Papua Location in Indonesia

Site information
- Type: Military airfield
- Controlled by: United States Army Air Forces

Location
- Coordinates: 01°56′20.38″S 139°00′51.44″E

Site history
- Built: 1943 (Japanese); Rebuilt by US Army (1944)
- In use: 1944-1945

Wakde Airfield is a World War II airfield located on Wakde Island, off the northern coast of New Guinea in Papua, Indonesia. The airfield was abandoned after the war and today is almost totally returned to its natural state.

== History ==
The airfield was constructed by the Japanese and was first noted by the Americans in February 1943. By June 1943, a single coral–surfaced 5,400' x 390' runway, with dispersal areas off the northern side was identified, and a barracks area on the south side was visible. By September, the Japanese had expanded the base further with a radio station and quarters for 1,000 personnel.

Wakde Airfield was seized by the United States Army on 15 May 1944. Construction work was begun to repair the airstrip once the battle was over on 18 May. The airfield was repaired and put into use by the Fifth Air Force as a forward operations base. From Wakde, the first American reconnaissance mission of the Philippines since the fall of Corregidor in 1942 was undertaken, over Mindanao.

=== Allied units stationed at Wakde Airfield ===
- XIII Bomber Command (3 September–17 October 1944)
- 5th Bombardment Group (17 August–22 September 1944)

Headquarters, 394th Bomb Squadron, B-24 Liberator

- 307th Bombardment Group (24 August–18 October 1944)

Headquarters, 370th, 371st, 372d, 424th Bomb Squadrons, B-24 Liberator

- 348th Fighter Group (22 May–26 August 1944)

Headquarters, 340th, 341st Fighter Squadrons, P-47 Thunderbolt

- 100th Service Squadron
- 13th Troop Carrier Squadron (403d Troop Carrier Group), (4–19 October 1944), C-47 Skytrain
- 63d Troop Carrier Squadron (403d Troop Carrier Group), (4–29 October 1944), C-47 Skytrain
- 64th Troop Carrier Squadron (403d Troop Carrier Group), (2–29 October 1944), C-47 Skytrain

== See also ==
- Naval Base Hollandia
- USAAF in the Southwest Pacific
