= 498th Nuclear Systems Wing =

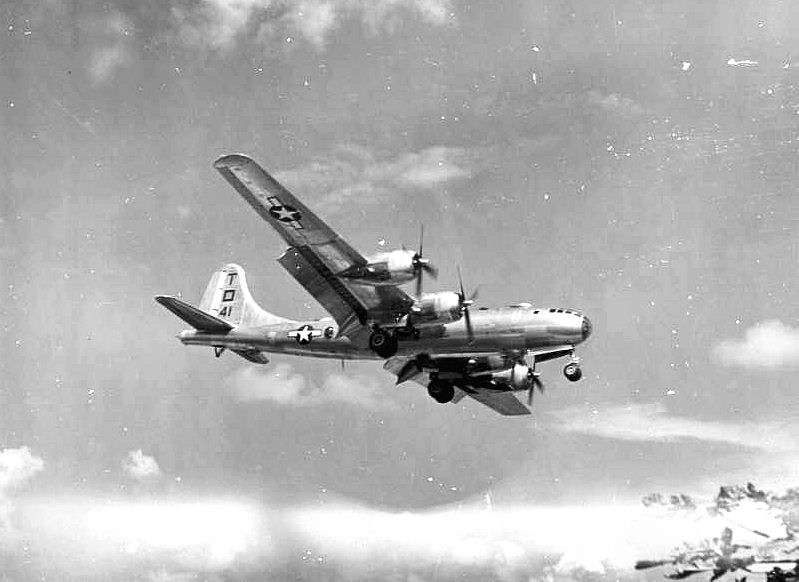
- 498th Group B-29 Superfortress landing at Isely Field, Saipan, 1945
- Active: 1943-1946; 1960-1969; 2006-2012
- Branch: United States Air Force
- Role: Management of nuclear weapons
- Part of: Air Force Materiel Command
- Engagements: Western Pacific Theater
- Decorations: Distinguished Unit Citation; Air Force Outstanding Unit Award

Insignia
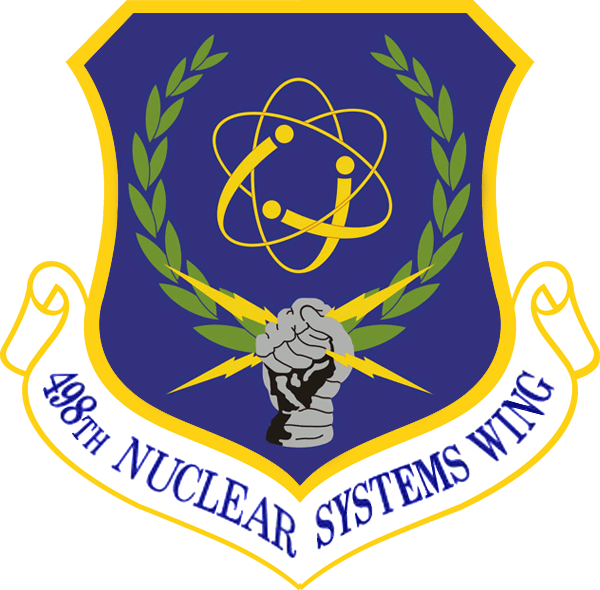
- 498th Nuclear Systems Wing emblem )Approved 25 August 2009)

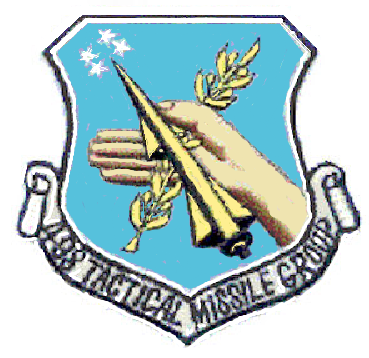
- 498 Tactical Missile Gp emblem (approved 19 December 1961)

The 498th Nuclear Systems Wing was a wing of the United States Air Force based at Kirtland Air Force Base, New Mexico.

== World War II ==
The wing was initially established as the 498th Bombardment Group, Very Heavy on 19 November 1943. The group remained unmanned until it was activated on 20 November 1943. The group was established at Clovis Army Air Field, New Mexico, and assigned to Second Air Force. It was to be a B-29 Superfortress group. The unit was formed with four bomb squadrons (873d, 874th, 875th and 876th), all being newly constituted.

It moved to Great Bend Army Air Field, Kansas in December 1943 to begin training. Because of a shortage of B-29s, the group was equipped with former II Bomber Command B-17 Flying Fortresses already at Great Bend which were previously used for training heavy bomber replacement personnel. In the spring of 1944, it finally received newly manufactured B-29 Superfortresses. In May shortages in aircraft and equipment led to the 876th Bomb Squadron being inactivated (10 May 1944), with its personnel being consolidated into other group squadrons (the 880th would be reactivated in August as part of the 383d Bombardment Group).

The 498th Bombardment Group operated very heavy (B-29 Superfortress) bombardment aircraft against Japan as part of Twentieth Air Force. Its aircraft were identified by a "T" and a square painted on the tail.

As a three squadron group, the 498th Group moved to the Mariana Islands in the North Pacific in September 1944, being assigned to the 73d Bombardment Wing, XXI Bomber Command, at Isely Field, Saipan. Upon arrival the group's personnel were engaged in Quonset hut construction. By mid-October most personnel were able to move into the huts from the initial tents in which they were accommodated on arrival. The group began operations with its first combat missions against Iwo Jima and the Truk Islands. Took part in the first attack (24 November 1944) on Japan by AAF planes based in the Marianas. Conducted numerous attacks against industrial targets in Japan, flying in daylight and at high altitude to carry out these missions.

The group received a Distinguished Unit Citation for striking an aircraft engine plant at Nagoya on 13 December 1944. Began flying missions at night in March 1945, operating from low altitude to drop incendiaries on area targets in Japan. The 498th BG received second DUC for incendiary raids. on urban industries near Kobe and Osaka during June 1945. Operations also included strikes against Japanese airfields during the Battle of Okinawa in April 1945. The group released propaganda leaflets over the Japanese home islands, July–August, continuing strategic bombing raids and incendiary attacks until the Japanese capitulation in August 1945.

In November 1945 the unit returned to the United States; initially being assigned to Continental Air Forces's (CAF) Fourth Air Force at March Field, California. At March Field, the 514th Bombardment Squadron joined the group; it previously being a Fifteenth Air Force B-24 Liberator squadron based in Italy, having been returned to the United States in May and was undergoing B-29 Very Heavy Bomber upgrade training in Nebraska when its former assigned group, the 376th Bombardment Group, was inactivated.

In January 1946, the 73d Bombardment Wing and the 498th Group under it was reassigned to the CAF Third Air Force at MacDill Field, Florida. It later was transferred to the new Strategic Air Command on 21 March 1946, being one of SAC's initial bombardment groups. Demobilization, however, was in full swing and the group turned in its aircraft and was inactivated on 4 August 1946. The 514th and 875th Bombardment Squadrons ended their service with the group that day. Its B-29 aircraft, personnel and equipment were retained, redesignated as the senior 307th Bombardment Group. The 307th Bombardment Group was activated at MacDill on the same day.

== Cold War ==
The unit was redesignated and reactivated as the 498th Tactical Missile Group at Kadena Air Base, Okinawa, on 16 September 1960. It was organized on 8 Feb 1961. It was equipped with the TM-76B Mace surface-to-surface missile. The Mace was a third-generation tactical USAF missile, a follow-up of the MGM-1 Matador which had been developed in the late 1940s and early 1950s from the World War II-era Republic-Ford JB-2. Two of the unit's World War II bomb squadrons were reactivated, the 873d and 874th Tactical Missile Squadrons to man and operate the missile sites. The Group was assigned directly to Pacific Air Forces. The four group Mace sites were located at Bolo Point in Yomitan, Onna Point, White Beach, and in Kin just north of Camp Hansen.

The presence of the Mace missile was a sensitive matter between the United States and Japan, even though the United States still formally occupied Okinawa. The presence of the nuclear-armed Mace missile on Japanese soil was considered so sensitive that Secretary of Defense Robert S. McNamara directed in early 1962 that the existence of the TM-76B weapons system on Okinawa "was not to be publicized in any way." McNamara directed that the "missile, warhead section, and nose sections be transported to and from the launch sites under a canvas cover." Fearing political maneuvering and protests from Communist sympathizers on Okinawa and in Japan, the 498th TMG was directed to be "identified by initials only."

In 1962 a failure in communication could have started a nuclear war. This statement is unsupported by factual information at this time. A single individual alleges this fact, without documentation, and the reference above simply repeats his story. It is an ongoing dialog, with the facts in dispute.

The group's existence was short, as in 1965, Secretary McNamara decided that the Army's MGM-31 Pershing missile should replace the USAF's Mace, mainly because of the Pershing's high-speed launch ability. The unit was inactivated on 8 July 1969, and the missiles returned to the United States and were expended as full-size target drones. Air Force Historical Research Agency records give the final formal date of inactivation as 31 December 1969.

== 21st century ==
The wing was redesignated as 498 Armament Systems Wing on 14 Feb 2006. It was activated on 31 Mar 2006. Redesignated as 498 Nuclear Systems Wing on 1 April 2009. The 498 NSW is responsible for integrating nuclear weapons and nuclear weapon system requirements and resources to deliver operational capabilities to the war-fighters. The wing ensures safe, secure, reliable and sustainable nuclear weapons, delivery support equipment and infrastructure are operationally ready to support national security requirements.

As part of the Air Force Materiel Command, the 498 NSW partners and customers are: Air Force Global Strike Command, U.S. Air Forces in Europe, Air Mobility Command, Air Education and Training Command, NATO, U.S. European Command, U.S. Strategic Command, Air Force Safety Center, Defense Threat Reduction and Los Alamos, Sandia and Lawrence Livermore National Laboratories.

=== Units ===
- 498th Missile Sustainment Division, Tinker AFB, Oklahoma
- 498th Nuclear Systems Division
- 498th Munitions Maintenance Group, Whiteman AFB, Missouri
- 798th Munitions Maintenance Group, Minot AFB, North Dakota

The 498th Munitions Maintenance Group squadrons performed in-depth maintenance on Air Force and Department of Energy assets from around the world. Their objective was to deliver all munitions and support to the correct location on time and in prime operating condition.

The 498 Nuclear Systems Wing was inactivated on 27 Jan 2012 as the Air Force transferred oversight of the nuclear munitions to the Air Force Global Strike Command.

== Assignments, components, stations, and equipment ==
- 73d Bombardment Wing, 20 Nov 1943
- Fifteenth Air Force, 19 May – 4 Aug 1946
- Pacific Air Forces, 16 Sep 1960
- 313th Air Division, 8 Feb 1961 – 31 Dec 1969
- Air Force Nuclear Weapons Center, 31 Mar 2006 – 27 Jan 2012

=== Components ===
- 514th Bombardment Squadron: 15 Oct 1945 – 7 Mar 1946
- 873d Bombardment (later, 873d Tactical Missile) Squadron: 20 Nov 1943 – 4 Aug 1946; 8 Feb 1961 – 8 Jul 1965
- 874th Bombardment (later, 874th Tactical Missile) Squadron: 20 Nov 1943 – 4 Aug 1946; 8 Sep 1961 – 8 Jul 1965
- 875th Bombardment Squadron: 20 Nov 1943 – 4 Aug 1946
- 876th Bombardment Squadron: 20 Nov 1943 – 10 May 1944
- 3d Photographic Reconnaissance Squadron, September–December 1944

(Flight of RB-24 Liberators attached)

- 21st Bombardment Maintenance Squadron
- 22d Bombardment Maintenance Squadron
- 23d Bombardment Maintenance Squadron
- 16th Photographic Laboratory Squadron

=== Stations ===
- Clovis Army Airfield, New Mexico, 20 Nov 1943
- Great Bend Army Airfield, Kansas, 13 Apr-13 Jul 1944
- Isely Field, Saipan, 6 Sep 1944 – 2 Nov 1945
- March Field, California, Dec 1945
- MacDill Field, Florida, 5 Jan-4 Aug 1946
- Kadena AB, Okinawa, 8 Feb 1961 – 31 Dec 1969
- Kirtland AFB, New Mexico, 31 Mar 2006 – 27 Jan 2012

=== Aircraft and missiles ===
- B-17 Flying Fortress, 1944
- B-29 Superfortress, 1944–1946
- RB-24 Liberator, 1944
- MGM-13 Mace missile, 1961–1969.
