= 875th Bombardment Squadron =

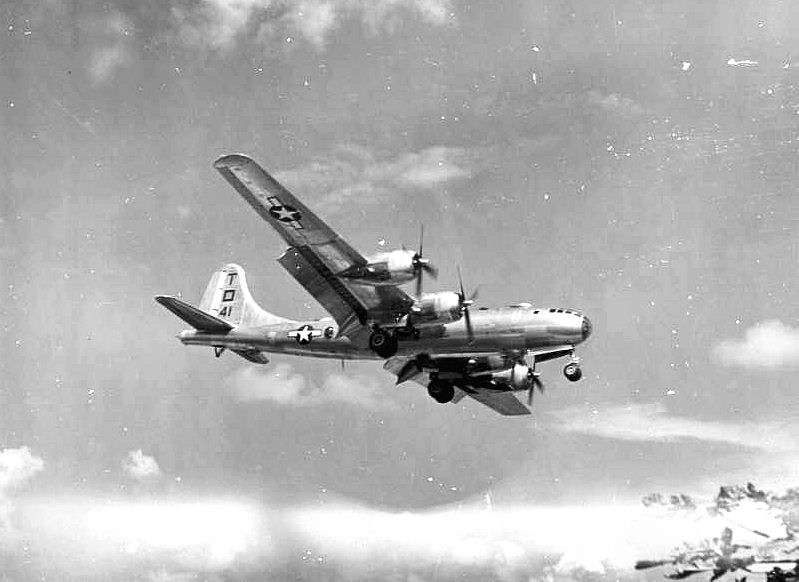
- 498th Bomb Group B-29 Superfortress landing at Isely Field Saipan
- Active: 1943–1946
- Country: United States
- Branch: United States Air Force
- Role: Heavy bomber
- Engagements: Pacific Ocean Theater of World War II
- Decorations: Distinguished Unit Citation

Insignia
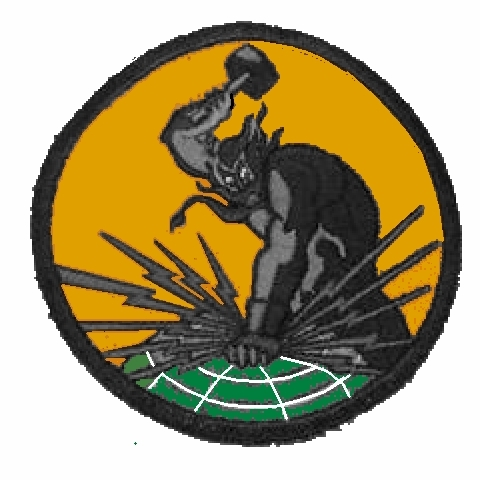
- 875th Bombardment Squadron emblem (Note: Approved 9 November 1944. Description: On an orange disc, border black, a stylized figure of Vulcan in light purple and black, standing over green globe marked with yellow lines of longitude and latitude in base, and holding in the left hand twelve red, jagged lightning flashes arranged seven to dexter, five to sinister, striking a blow with a large light purple and black sledge held aloft in the right hand.)

The 875th Bombardment Squadron is a former United States Army Air Forces unit. The squadron was activated in late 1943 for service during World War II. After training in the United States with Boeing B-29 Superfortress bombers, the squadron moved to the Mariana Islands, where it participated in the strategic bombing campaign against Japan, earning two Distinguished Unit Citations before the end of hostilities in August 1945. The squadron returned to the United states in December 1945 and was inactivated in March 1946, and its personnel and equipment transferred to another organization.

== History ==
The squadron was first activated at Clovis Army Air Field, New Mexico in November 1943 as one of the four original squadrons of the 498th Bombardment Group, an early Boeing B-29 Superfortress very heavy bomber squadron. The squadron trained in New Mexico and at Great Bend Army Air Field, Kansas with early model B-29s until July 1944, when it began its deployment to the Pacific.

The squadron arrived at its combat station, Isely Field, Saipan in September 1944. The squadron's first missions were flown against targets on Iwo Jima and Truk Island. On 24 November 1944, the squadron participated in the first raid on Japan by bombers based in the Mariana Islands. The squadron initially engaged in high altitude daylight attacks against industrial targets in Japan. It was awarded a Distinguished Unit Citation (DUC) for an attack on an aircraft manufacturing plant in Nagoya on 13 December 1944.

In March 1945, the Twentieth Air Force changed tactics and the squadron began flying low level night attacks with incendiaries against area targets. The 875th received a second DUC for its actions during a low level raid on urban industries near Kobe and Osaka in June 1945. Squadron operations also included attacks on airfields in Okinawa during the invasion of Okinawa in April 1945. After V-J Day, the squadron remained on Saipan until November and reassembled at March Field, California the following month. It became one of the first bombardment units in Strategic Air Command in March 1946, but was inactivated at MacDill Field, Florida on 4 August and its personnel and equipment were transferred to the 372d Bombardment Squadron, which was simultaneously activated.

=== Lineage ===
- Constituted as the 875th Bombardment Squadron, Very Heavy on 19 November 1943

Activated on 20 November 1943
Inactivated on 4 August 1946

=== Assignments ===
- 498th Bombardment Group, 20 November 1943 – 4 August 1946

=== Stations ===
- Clovis Army Air Field, New Mexico, 20 November 1943
- Great Bend Army Air Field, Kansas, 13 April – 16 July 1944
- Isely Field, Saipan, 7 September 1944 – 1 November 1945
- March Field, California, c. 7 December 1943
- MacDill Field, Florida, 5 January – 4 August 1946

=== Aircraft ===
- Boeing B-17 Flying Fortress, 1944
- Boeing B-29 Superfortress, 1944–1946

=== Awards and campaigns ===
Award streamer	Award	Dates	Notes
	Distinguished Unit Citation	13 December 1944	Japan, 875th Bombardment Squadron
	Distinguished Unit Citation	1–7 June 1945	Japan, 875th Bombardment Squadron

Campaign Streamer	Campaign	Dates	Notes
	Air Offensive, Japan	7 September 1944 – 2 September 1945	875th Bombardment Squadron
	Eastern Mandates	7 September 1944 – 14 April 1944	875th Bombardment Squadron
	Western Pacific	17 April 1945 – 2 September 1945	875th Bombardment Squadron

== See also ==
- B-17 Flying Fortress units of the United States Army Air Forces
- List of B-29 Superfortress operators

== Notes ==
Explanatory notes

Citations
