= 874th Tactical Missile Squadron =

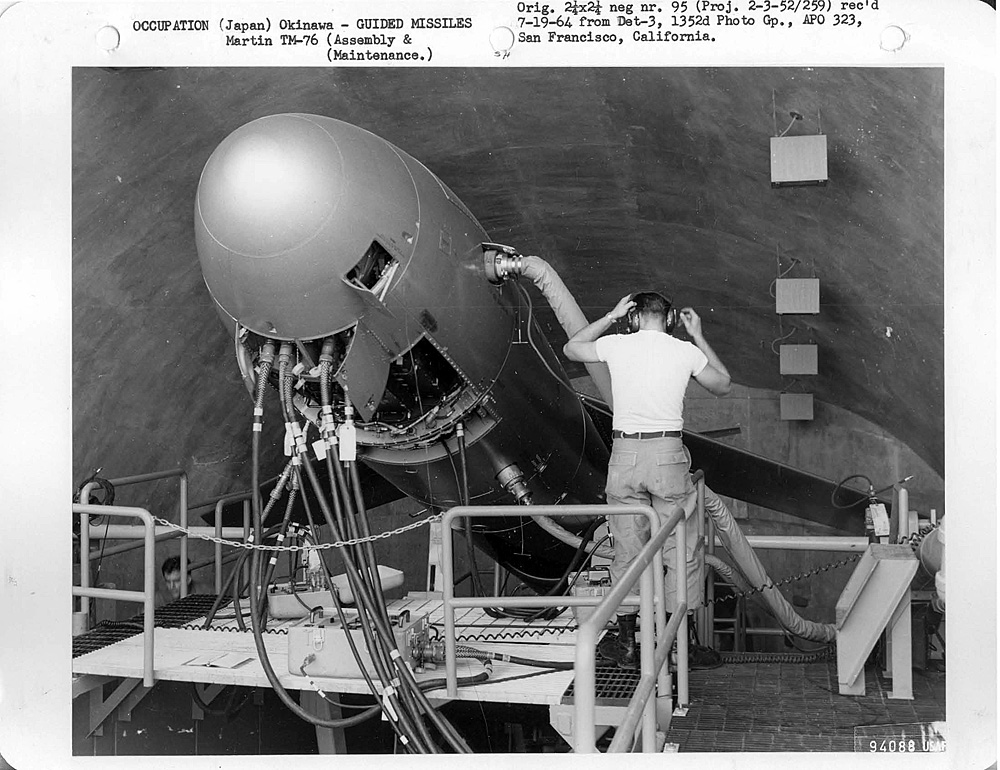
- TM-76 Mace of the 498th Tactical Missile Group
- Active: 1943–1946; 1961–1965
- Country: United States
- Branch: United States Air Force
- Role: Tactical missile
- Engagements: Pacific Theater
- Decorations: Distinguished Unit Citation; Air Force Outstanding Unit Award

Insignia
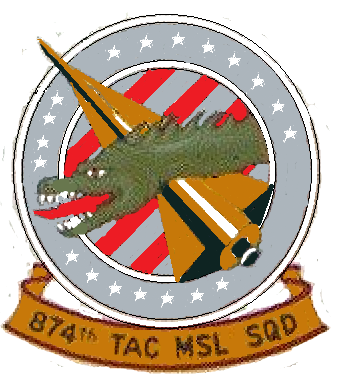
- 874th Tactical Missile Squadron emblem

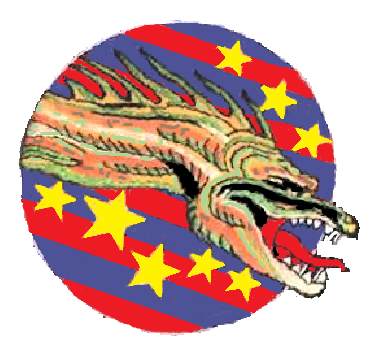
- 874th Bombardment Squadron emblem (Note: Approved 10 August 1944. Description: over and through a disc bendy of 12 blue and red, the head and neck of a green dragon, striking toward sinister base between 8 white stars, arranged 3 to chief and 5 to base.)

The 874th Tactical Missile Squadron is an inactive United States Air Force unit. Its last assignment was with 498th Tactical Missile Group at Kadena Air Base, Okinawa. The squadron was first activated in late 1943 for service during World War II as the 874th Bombardment Squadron. After training in the United States with Boeing B-29 Superfortress bombers, the squadron moved to the Mariana Islands, where it participated in the strategic bombing campaign against Japan, earning two Distinguished Unit Citations before the end of hostilities in August 1945. The squadron returned to the United States in December 1945 and was inactivated in March 1946, and its personnel and equipment transferred to another organization.

The 874th was activated again at Kadena in 1961, and became one of the first Air Force units to operate the TM-76B Mace cruise missile, serving in that role until 1965.

== History ==
=== B-29 Superfortress operations against Japan ===
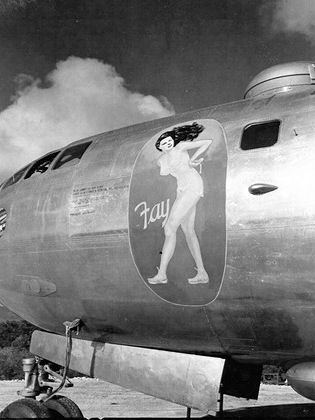
874th Bomb Sq B-29 Superfortress (Note: Aircraft is Martin Aircraft built Boeing B-29-5-MO Superfortress, serial 42-65210, Filthy Fay (later Fay). Shot down on 25 March 1945 in an attack on the Mitsubishi Aircraft Company factory, all eleven crewmembers were lost. Baugher, Joe (10 June 2023). "1942 USAF Serial Numbers". Joe Baugher. Missing Air Crew Report 13447.)

The squadron was first activated at Clovis Army Air Field, New Mexico in November 1943 as one of the four original squadrons of the 498th Bombardment Group, an early Boeing B-29 Superfortress very heavy bomber squadrons. The squadron trained in New Mexico and at Great Bend Army Air Field, Kansas with early model B-29s until July 1944, when it began its deployment to the Pacific.

The squadron arrived at its combat station, Isely Field, Saipan in September 1944. The squadron's first missions were flown against targets on Iwo Jima and Truk Island. On 24 November 1944, the squadron participated in the first raid on Japan by bombers based in the Mariana Islands. The squadron initially engaged in high altitude daylight attacks against industrial targets in Japan. It was awarded a Distinguished Unit Citation (DUC) for an attack on an aircraft manufacturing plant in Nagoya on 13 December 1944.

In March 1945, the tactics of Twentieth Air Force changed and the squadron began flying low level night attacks with incendiaries against area targets. The 874th received a second DUC for its actions during a low level raid on urban industries near Kobe and Osaka in June 1945. Squadron operations also included attacks on airfields in Okinawa during the invasion of Okinawa in April 1945. After V-J Day, the squadron remained on Saipan until November and reassembled at March Field, California the following month. It became one of the first bombardment units in Strategic Air Command in March 1946, but was inactivated at MacDill Field, Florida on 4 August and its personnel and equipment were transferred to the 371st Bombardment Squadron, which was simultaneously activated.

=== Tactical missile operations ===
The squadron was redesignated the 874th Tactical Missile Squadron and reactivated in September 1961 as a TM-76 Mace surface to surface missile squadron at Kadena Air Base Okinawa. However, it was not until early in 1962 that the 498th Tactical Missile Group's first launch site at Bolo Point became operational. Early arrivals to the squadron assisted contractor personnel in making the launch sites operational. Other launch sites were at Onna Point, White Beach, and in Kin just north of Camp Hansen. Once all four sites were operational, the squadron took over the two most recently completed sites. The squadron was equipped with the B model of the Mace, which was deployed so that a single crew was able to launch all missiles located at a single launch site directly from the underground bunkers in which they were stored. The 874th was one of the first squadrons equipped with the TM-76B, which used an inertial guidance system.

During the Cuban Missile Crisis, the squadron was placed on high alert status. Missile down time for routine maintenance was not permitted, and when a malfunction required taking a missile off alert, its planned target had to be covered by placing a Republic F-105 Thunderchief on cockpit alert at the end of Kadena's runway. The 874th was inactivated in July 1965 and remaining Mace operations were transferred directly to the 498th Group, which remained active until 1969. One of the dismantled Mace sites now houses a Buddhist training center for Soka Gakkai International. The facility is now known as the "Fortress of Peace" and houses two museums including one devoted to the nuclear weapons once based on Okinawa.

== Lineage ==
- Constituted as the 874th Bombardment Squadron, Very Heavy on 19 November 1943

Activated on 20 November 1943
Inactivated on 4 August 1946

- Redesignated 874th Tactical Missile Squadron and activated, on 25 April 1961 (not organized)

Organized on 8 September 1961
Inactivated on 8 July 1965

=== Assignments ===
- 498th Bombardment Group, 20 November 1943 – 4 August 1946
- Pacific Air Forces, 25 April 1961 (not organized)
- 498th Tactical Missile Group, 8 September 1961 – 8 July 1965

=== Stations ===
- Clovis Army Air Field, New Mexico, 20 November 1943
- Great Bend Army Air Field, Kansas, 13 April – 16 July 1944
- Isely Field, Saipan, 7 September 1944 – 1 November 1945
- March Field, California, c. 7 December 1943
- MacDill Field, Florida, 5 January – 4 August 1946
- Kadena Air Base, Okinawa, 8 September 1961 – 8 July 1965

=== Aircraft and missiles ===
- Boeing B-17 Flying Fortress, 1944
- Boeing B-29 Superfortress, 1944–1946
- Martin M-76B (later MGM-13B, CGM-13B) Mace, 1961–1969

=== Awards and campaigns ===
Award streamer	Award	Dates	Notes
	Distinguished Unit Citation	13 December 1944	Japan, 874th Bombardment Squadron
	Distinguished Unit Citation	1–7 June 1945	Japan, 874th Bombardment Squadron
	Air Force Outstanding Unit Award	8 February 1961 – 29 May 1963	874th Tactical Missile Squadron

Campaign Streamer	Campaign	Dates	Notes
	Air Offensive, Japan	7 September 1944 – 2 September 1945	874th Bombardment Squadron
	Eastern Mandates	7 September 1944 – 14 April 1944	874th Bombardment Squadron
	Western Pacific	17 April 1945 – 2 September 1945	874th Bombardment Squadron

== See also ==
- B-17 Flying Fortress units of the United States Army Air Forces
- List of B-29 Superfortress operators
- List of United States Air Force missile squadrons
