= Wakde =

Two islands in Indonesia

Wakde is an island group in Sarmi Regency, Papua, Indonesia, between the districts of Pantai Timur and Tor Atas. It comprises two islands, Insumuar (the larger) and Insumanai (much smaller).

== History ==
Occupied by Japanese forces in April 1942, they built an airbase. United States forces landed in May 1944 (the Battle of Wakde or Operation Straight Line) and renamed the facilities Wakde Airfield.

In September 2005, the remains of Japanese soldiers and Papuans were found in a cave on the uninhabited island.

== Geography ==
The island is located at 1°56′S 139°1′E, two miles off the northern coast of Papua, near the Tor River.
