= Pitu Airport =

Pitu Airport Bandar Udara Pitu
- IATA: OTI; ICAO: WAMR

Summary
- Airport type: Public, military
- Operator: Government
- Serves: Morotai, Daruba
- Location: Morotai Island, North Maluku, Indonesia
- Time zone: WITA (UTC+09:00)
- Elevation AMSL: 49 ft / 15 m
- Coordinates: 02°02′45.76″N 128°19′29.28″E

Map
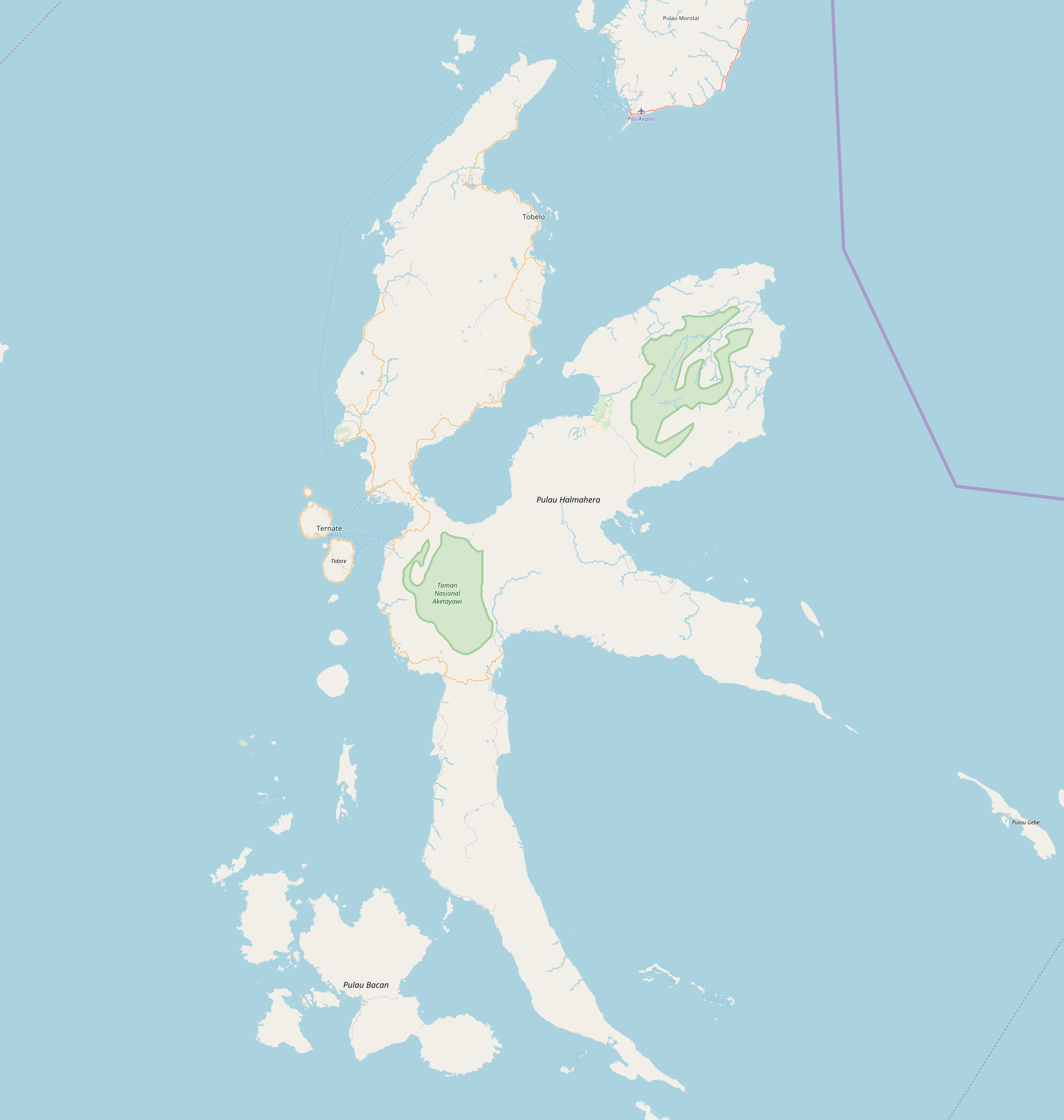
- Location of airport in North Maluku

Runways
Direction	Length		Surface
Direction	ft	m	Surface
09/27	7,874	2,400	Asphalt
~~09R/27L~~	~~7,949~~	~~2,423~~	~~Asphalt~~
- Source: World Aero Data

Leo Wattimena Air Force Base
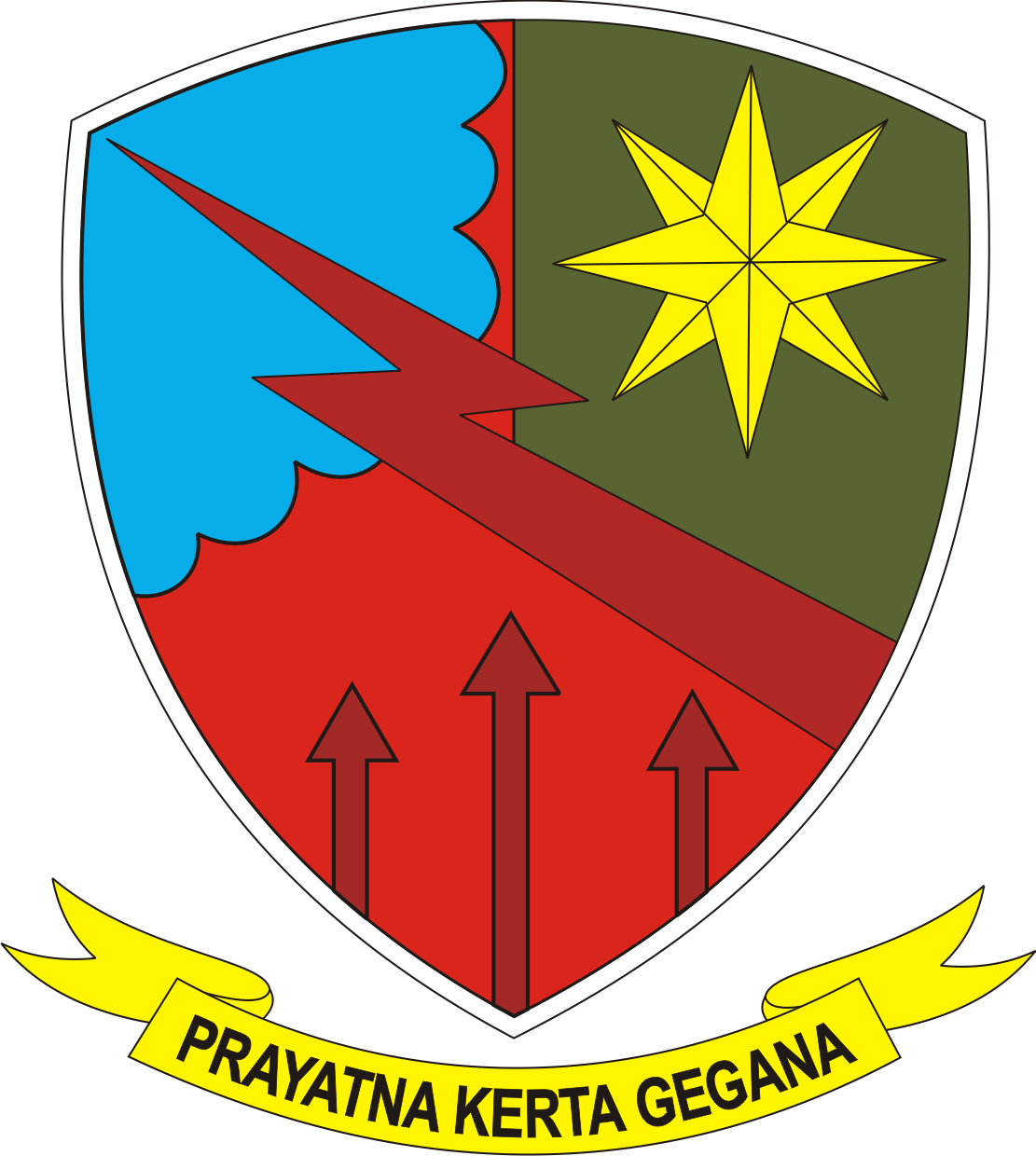
- Air Force Base Emblem
- Country: Indonesia
- Branch: TNI Angkatan Udara
- Type: Air Force Base Type B
- Part of: Koopsau III
- Website: www.tni-au.mil.id

Pitu Airport (IATA: OTI, ICAO: WAEW), aka Leo Wattimena Airport, is a public airport located on the southern coast of Morotai Island, North Maluku, Indonesia.

== History ==
=== World War II ===
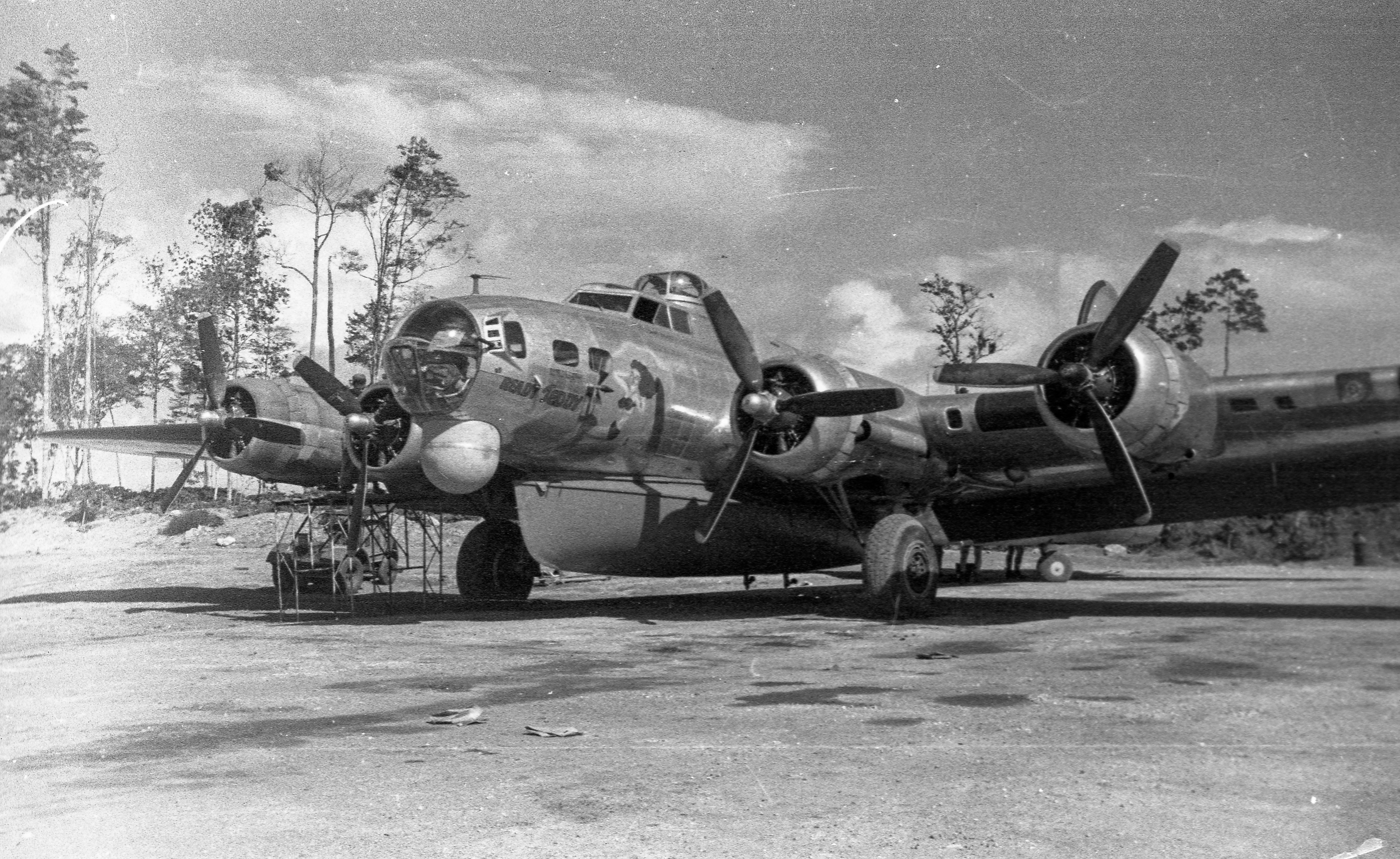
Boeing SB-17G "Ready Teddy," Morotai Island, 1945 (Courtesy of the City of Coffs Harbour, Accession Number mus07-8837).

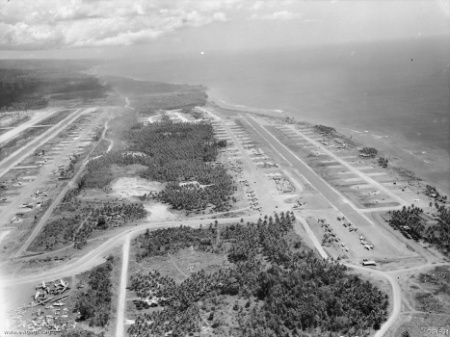
Aerial view of Pitu (left) and Wama (right) airfields in 1945

Morotai island was the final island invasion in Netherlands New Guinea before the liberation of the Philippines. The island was recaptured on 15 September 1944 during the Battle of Morotai by the 31st Infantry Division, meeting only light opposition. General MacArthur and Rear Admiral Barbey landed on the day of the invasion to make an inspection. At the time, the island had only five hundred Japanese defenders.

After the landings, Navy Seabees constructed two airfields on the island, Wama and Pitu. Wama was constructed almost along the shoreline and was used as a fighter airfield. It was abandoned after the war. Pitu was built as a bomber airfield to the north inland, and is currently used as a commercial airport.

After the war, the island was one of the largest Fifth Air Force aircraft reclamation centers in the Pacific. A smelting operation was established, and USAAF planes from all over the region were flown there to be scrapped. Despite scrapping, the island was crammed full of aircraft and vehicles until 1988 when it was cleared in a final scrap drive. The scrap was taken to Krakatau Steel Mill in Java.

==== Allied units stationed on Morotai ====
- 38th Bombardment Group (15 October 1944 – 29 January 1945)
- 310th Bombardment Wing (18 September-14 November 1944)
- 8th Fighter Group (19 September – 20 December 1944)
- 35th Fighter Group (27 September 1944 – 20 January 1945)
- 418th Night Fighter Squadron (28 September – 26 December 1944)

=== West New Guinea dispute ===
During the buildup in preparation of Operation Trikora in early 1962, the Indonesian Air Force utilized Morotai airfield as one of the frontline airbases. In late June 1962, the air force deployed four to six Tu-16 strategic bombers, six to ten Il-28 medium bombers, two UF-1 Albatross search-and-rescue seaplanes and two Mi-4 helicopters at Morotai. Later the Il-28s were moved to Laha and Amahai due to insufficient range to the Western New Guinea. The Indonesian Navy naval aviation also deployed eight Gannet anti-submarine aircraft. For the airbase defenses, the air force stationed six MiG-17 as interceptor and air defense, a Polish-built Nyasa radar unit as early warning system, an anti-aircraft unit equipped with Hispano-Suiza HS.804 cannons, and a company of base defense troops. The Indonesian Army also stationed an air-defense artillery unit from Pattimura Battalion.

== Airlines and destinations ==
Airlines	Destinations
Wings Air	Ternate

== See also ==
- USAAF in the Southwest Pacific
