= William F. Fiedler =

American flying ace (1920–1943)

William Francis Fiedler Jr.
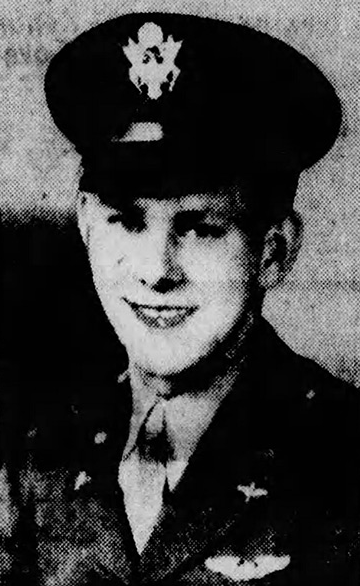
- Born: June 5, 1920; Indianapolis, Indiana, U.S.
- Died: June 30, 1943 (aged 23); Henderson Field, Guadalcanal, Solomon Islands
- Burial place: National Memorial Cemetery of the Pacific
- Military career
- Allegiance: United States of America
- Branch: United States Army Air Forces
- Service years: 1941–1943
- Rank: First lieutenant
- Nickname: "Bill"
- Units: 70th Fighter Squadron; 68th Fighter Squadron
- Conflicts: World War II
- Awards: Distinguished Flying Cross; Purple Heart; Air Medal (2)

William Francis Fiedler Jr. (June 5, 1920 – June 30, 1943) was an American fighter pilot during World War II. He holds the distinction of being the only American fighter pilot to become a flying ace in the Bell P-39 Airacobra.

== Early life ==
Fiedler was born on June 5, 1920, in Indianapolis, Indiana, and grew up in Akron, Ohio. He graduated from Central High School in Akron and then enrolled in Ohio Northern University where he attended for one year and was a quarterback on the football team.

== World War II ==
Following the United States entry into World War II after the Japanese attack on Pearl Harbor on December 7, 1941, Fiedler enlisted in the United States Army Air Forces on December 21 at Fort Hayes, Ohio, as an aviation cadet. He completed flight training, and earned wings and was commissioned as a second lieutenant.

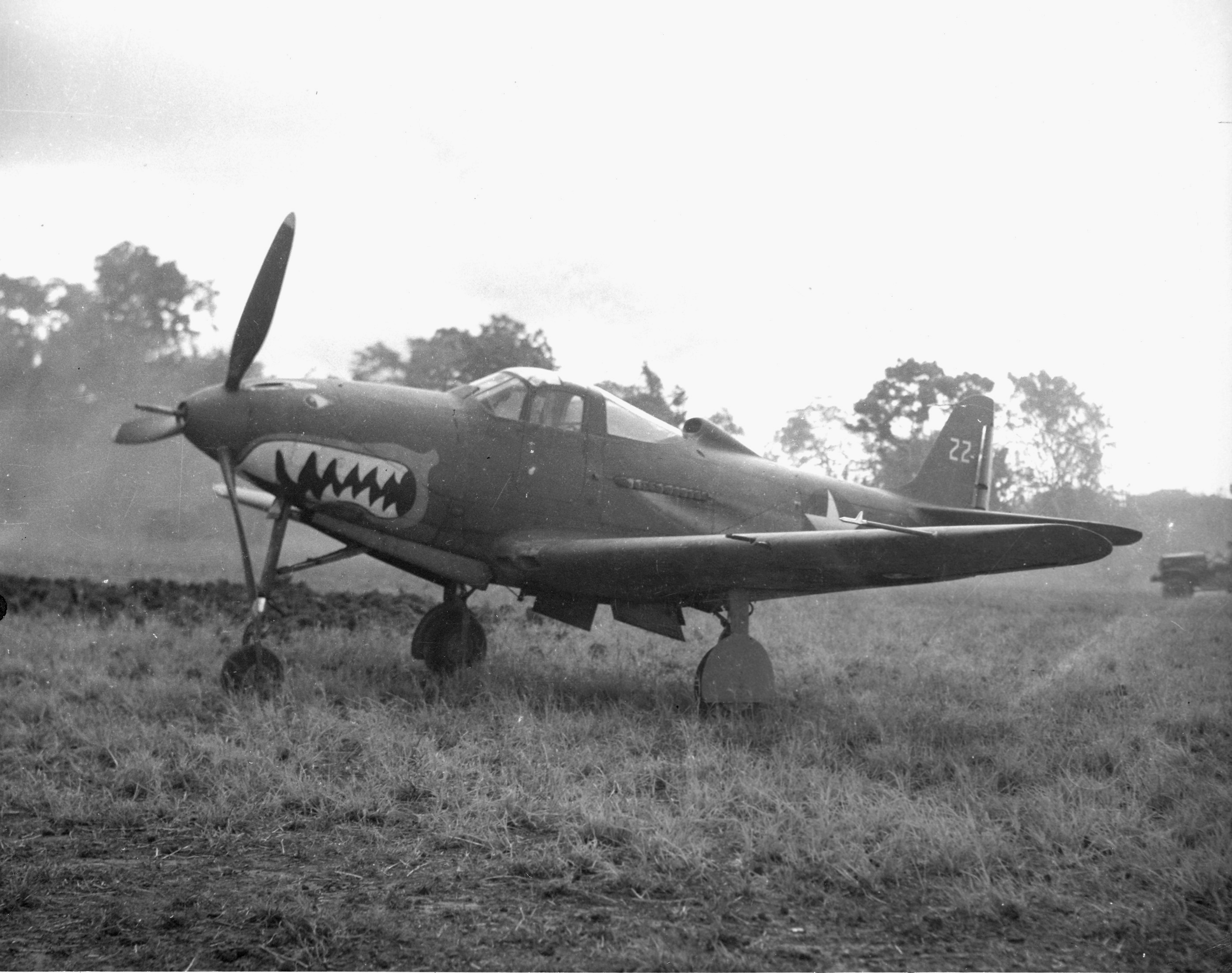
P-39 Airacobra on Guadalcanal

After completion of flight training, he was sent to Nadi, Fiji, and was assigned as a Bell P-39 Airacobra pilot with the 70th Fighter Squadron of the 347th Fighter Group. In January 1943, the 347th FG was assigned to the Thirteenth Air Force and was stationed at Henderson Field in Guadalcanal, Solomon Islands, during the Solomon Islands campaign. On January 26, while flying a patrol over Choiseul Island, he and his wingman spotted a Kawanishi H6K 'Mavis' flying boat. Both the pilots made a low approach and strafing pass at the flying boat, resulting in substantial damage and subsequent sinking of the H6K. Then, the escorting Mitsubishi A6M 'Zeros' noticed the P-39 and intercepted the P-39s, shooting down Fiedler's wingman. In the subsequent dogfight, Fiedler managed to down one Zero and returned to base safely.

On February 4, 1943, during an interception of 25 Zeros flying cover for Imperial Japanese Navy destroyers evacuating exhausted Japanese troops from Guadalcanal, Fiedler shot down a Zero just north of Kolombangara Island, his second aerial victory. He was assigned to the 68th Fighter Squadron and on June 12, while intercepting a formation of Zeros conducting a fighter sweep over Russell Islands, he shot down one of them ten miles (16 km) off Cape Esperance, his third aerial victory.

On June 16, 1943, after being alerted by an Australian coastwatcher on Vella Lavella of a formation of 38 Zeros along with 30 other Zeros escorting a formation of Aichi D3A 'Val' dive bombers to attack US Navy transports off Guadalcanal, Fiedler along with five other P-39 pilots flew to intercept the formation. In the dogfight, he shot down two Vals, with the second one with only .30 caliber wing guns of his P-39. With a total of five aerial victories, this earned him the title of flying ace and only American pilot to earn so while flying the P-39.

On June 30, 1943, while on board his P-39 waiting to depart for a combat mission from Henderson Field, a Lockheed P-38 Lightning, suffering from engine failure, landed on the same runway and collided with the P-39, causing both aircraft to explode. Fiedler was pulled from the wreckage unconscious and died hours later while being treated at a field hospital.

== Military decorations ==

Army Air Forces Pilot Badge
Distinguished Flying Cross	Purple Heart	Air Medal with bronze oak leaf cluster
American Campaign Medal	Asiatic–Pacific Campaign Medal with two bronze campaign stars	World War II Victory Medal

== Bibliography ==
- Stanaway, John (2001). P-39 Airacobra Aces of World War 2 (Hardcover). Bloomsbury Publishing. ISBN 9781841762043.
