= William Fiedler =

William Fiedler may refer to:

- Bill Fiedler (1910–1985), American soccer midfielder
- William F. Fiedler (1920–1943), American fighter pilot and flying ace
- William H. F. Fiedler (1847–1919), U.S. Representative from New Jersey
