= 347th Rescue Wing =

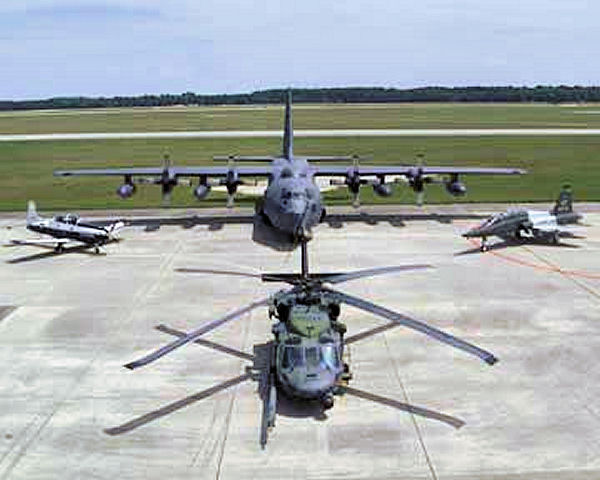
- Aircraft of the 347th Rescue Wing, about 2002. (Note: Shown are the HC-130P (top), T-6 Texan II (left), T-38C (right), and HH-60G (bottom).)
- Active: 1948–1950; 1968–1972; 1973–1975; 1975–2006
- Country: United States
- Branch: United States Air Force
- Role: Combat search and rescue
- Engagements: Vietnam War
- Decorations: Air Force Outstanding Unit Award with Combat "V" Device; Air Force Outstanding Unit Award

Insignia
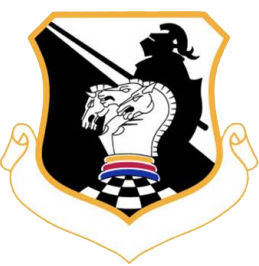
- 347th Rescue Wing emblem (Note: Approved 26 March 1967.)

The 347th Rescue Wing is an inactive United States Air Force unit. It was last assigned to the Air Force Special Operations Command, stationed at Moody Air Force Base, Georgia. It was inactivated on 1 October 2006.

== History ==
=== Japan ===
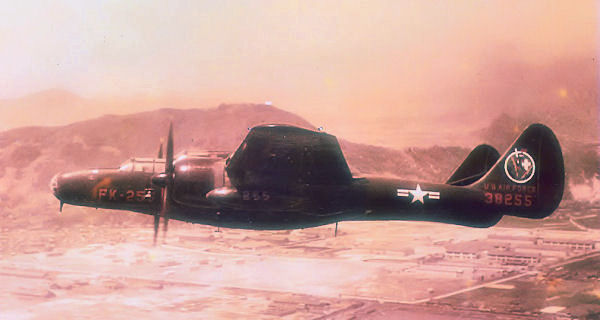
68th Fighter Squadron F-61 Black Widow (Note: Aircraft is Northrop F-61B-20-NO Black Widow, serial 43-8237 flying over Japan, 1949. This was one of the last USAF active duty Black Widows.)

The 347th Fighter Wing (All Weather) was activated in Japan on 10 August 1948 as part of Far East Air Forces' 315th Composite Wing to perform air defense duties. The wing was assembled from three former Northrop F-61 Black Widow night fighter squadrons, the 6th, 418th, and 421st Night Fighter Squadrons. The squadrons were inactivated and replaced by the 4th, 68th, and 339th Fighter Squadrons (All Weather).

The 4th Fighter Squadron deployed to Kadena Air Base, Okinawa, where it was attached to the 51st Fighter Group.

The useful life of the F-61 was extended due to the Air Force's problems in fielding a jet-powered all weather fighter. The Curtiss XF-87 Blackhawk was the planned replacement, however problems in development led to the Black Widow being replaced by another propeller-driven fighter, the North American F-82 Twin Mustang.

The Twin Mustangs started to arrive during mid-1949. The 347th was the last active duty USAF unit to fly the Black Widow. The 339th retired its last F-61 in May 1950, missing the Korean War by only a month. The wing was redesignated the 347th Fighter-All Weather Wing on 20 Jan 1950 at Yokota Air Base. It was inactivated on 24 June 1950.

Redesignated the 347th Tactical Fighter Wing and organized at Yokota Air Base on 15 January 1968 as part of Fifth Air Force, of Pacific Air Forces. In Japan, the wing performed tactical fighter training missions, aerial reconnaissance, and contingency operations. Its operational squadrons were the following:

- 34th Tactical Fighter Squadron: 15 January 1968 – 15 March 1971 (Deployed June 1968 – March 1971 to 388th TFW,
- 35th Tactical Fighter Squadron: 15 January 1968 – 15 March 1971 (Detached 22 March - 10 June 1968),
- 36th Tactical Fighter Squadron: 15 January 1968 – 15 May 1971.
- 80th Tactical Fighter Squadron: 15 January 1968 – 15 March 1971 (Non-operational 15 February - 15 March 1971), (TC: GR
- 556th Tactical Reconnaissance Squadron (TRS): 1 July 1968 – 15 May 1971 Martin EB/RB-57E Canberra, Lockheed C-130B-II, Sun Valley) (B-57 Tail Code: GT, C-130Bs uncoded)

The 35th, 36th, and 80th TFS were equipped with the McDonnell-Douglas F-4C Phantom IIs and flew tactical fighter training missions. The 556th TFS flew various electronic warfare and special operations sorties of a classified nature. 347th TFW F-4C aircrews would rotate TDY to and from the 34th Squadron. Squadron transferred permanently to the 388th TFW, March 1971.

In 1971 the US and Japan agreed that all combat squadrons based at Yokota were to be reassigned and Yokota became a non-flying station hosted by the 475th Air Base Wing. 35th TFS aircraft were transferred to 67th TFS/18th TFW, Kadena Air Base Okinawa. The 36th TFS and 80th TFS aircraft were transferred to 3rd TFW, Kusan AB, South Korea. The 554th TRS B-57s were reassigned to the 363rd Tactical Reconnaissance Wing (TRW) at Shaw AFB, South Carolina. The C-130s were retained at Yokota and reassigned to the incoming 475th Air Base Wing.

=== Mountain Home AFB ===
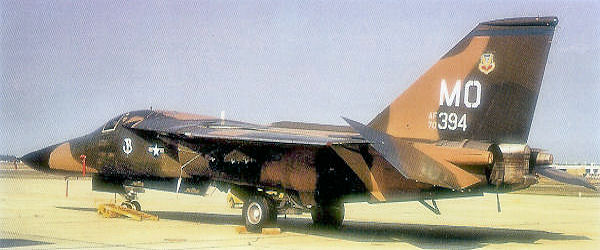
General Dynamics F-111F 70–2394, 347th TFW, Mountain Home AFB, 16 September 1972. In 1986, this aircraft took part in the raid on Libya, Operation El Dorado Canyon.

The 347th TFW was reactivated on 15 May 1971 and equipped with factory-fresh General Dynamics F-111F Aardvarks, replacing the 67th Tactical Reconnaissance Wing as host unit at Mountain Home AFB, Idaho. The 67 TFW moved in July 1971 to Bergstrom Air Force Base, Texas. Equipped with the F-111F, the 347th had a short stay at Mountain Home, conducting F-111F training until 1 October 1972, when the 366 TFW moved from Vietnam to Mountain Home. Upon its arrival, the 366th TFW absorbed all the personnel and equipment of the 347th TFW.

Operational squadrons of the wing were:

- 391st Tactical Fighter (July 1971 – October 1972) (Tail Code: MO)
- 4589th Tactical Fighter Squadron (July 1971 – October 1971) (Tail Code: MP)
  389th Tactical Fighter (October 1971 – October 1972) (Tail Code: MP/MO)
- 4590th Tactical Fighter Squadron (July 1971 – June 1972) (Tail Code: MQ)
  390th Tactical Fighter (June – October 1972) (Tail Code: MO)

The 4589th/4590th TFS were provisional units, pending the transfer of the 389th TFS and 390th TFS from the 12th TFW and 366th TFW in Southeast Asia. All three squadrons adopted the MO tail code under the common wing concept in June 1972. The 347th TFW was inactivated on 31 October 1972.

=== Takhli RTAFB ===
On 30 July 1973 the 347th Tactical Fighter Wing was reactivated at Takhli Royal Thai Air Force Base (RTAFB), Thailand, replacing the 474th Tactical Fighter Wing which returned to Nellis AFB, Nevada United States and inheriting two squadrons of 24 F-111As each. These were:

- 428 Tactical Fighter Squadron "Buccaneers" (Tail Code: HG – Red Tail Fin)
- 429th Tactical Fighter Squadron "Black Falcons" (Tail Code: HG – Yellow Tail Fin)

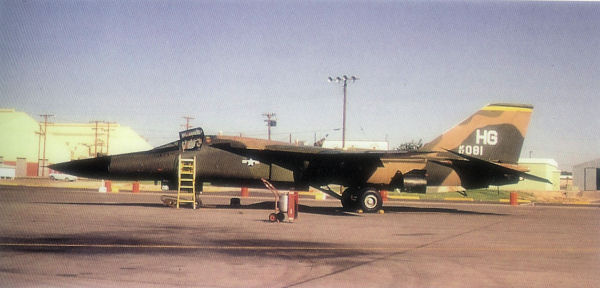
General Dynamics F-111A Serial 67-081 of the 422d FWS taken at Nellis AFB Nevada in 1975 still showing its 347th TFW tail code (HG). It remained in USAF service with various wings until being retired to AMARC on 21 June 1991.

The 428th TFS and 429th TFS continued to conduct beacon bombing and Pathfinder operations in Cambodia as part of the 347th TFW until the termination of combat air operations on 15 August 1973. On 15 August the last wartime mission of the Vietnam Era was flown as the final mission of Constant Guard by F-111A 67–113. After the ceasefire, the Wing was maintained in a combat-ready status for possible contingency actions.

During January 1974 the Secretary of Defense announced a realignment of Thailand resources, with the final pullout of air resources by the end of 1976. In June 1974, two F-111Ss from the 347th TFW flew from Takhli to Osan Air Base South Korea and conducted live weapons demonstrations for Republic of Korea and US officials at Nightmare Range.

Takhli RTAFB was returned to the Royal Thai Air Force in July 1974.

=== Korat Royal Thai Air Force Base ===
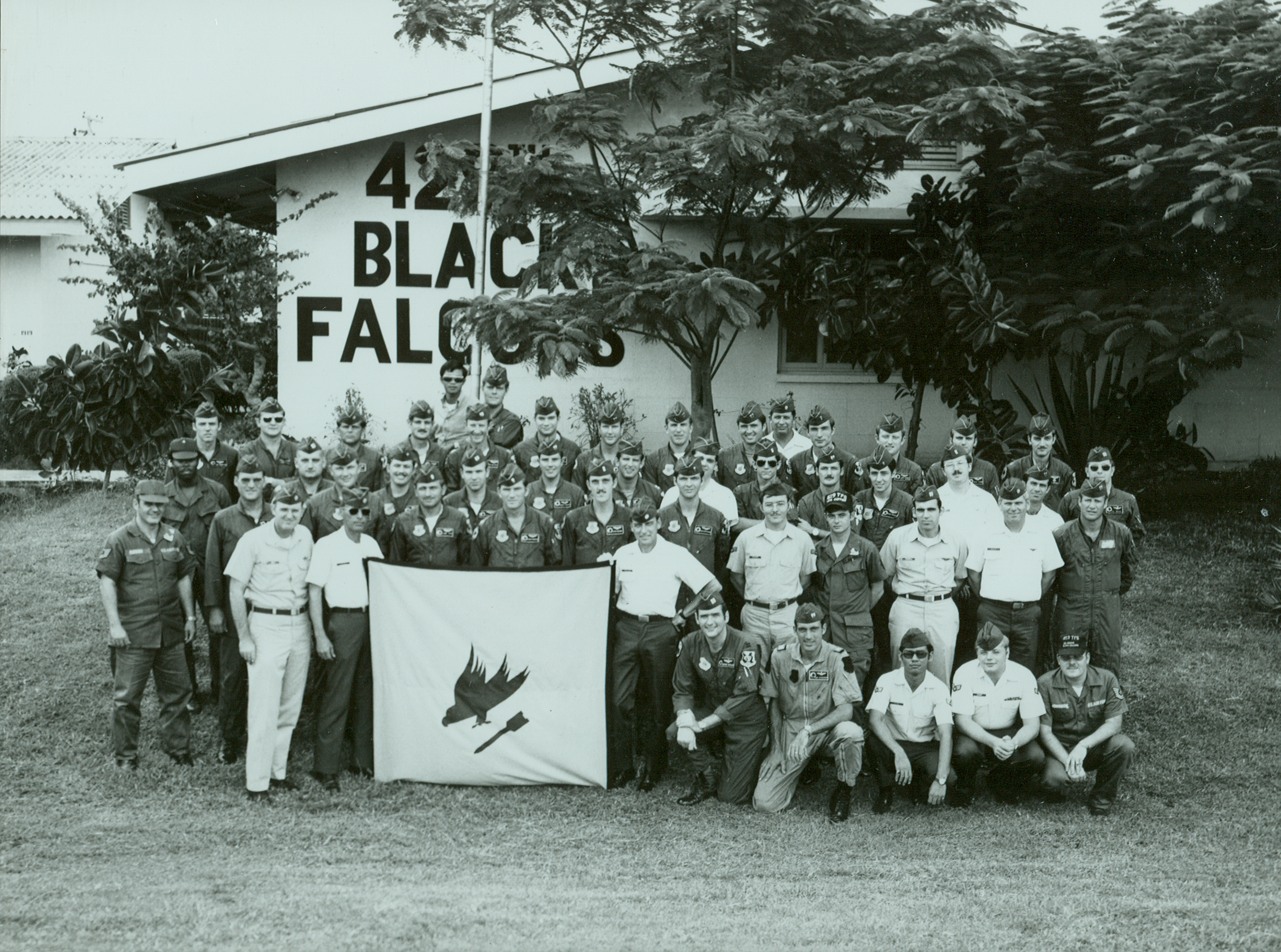
429 Tactical Fighter Squadron Korat RTAFB 1974.

With the return of Takhli to the Royal Thai Air Force, the two F-111A squadrons (428th TFS, 429th TFS) of the 347th TFW were transferred to Korat Royal Thai Air Force Base. At Korat, the 347th TFW performed training readiness missions. It participated in the recovery of the American merchantman SS Mayaguez from the Khmer Rouge 13–14 May 1975. Two F-111As aircraft sank and/or damaged several Khmer Rouge gunboats near Koh Tang Island during the engagement with Kymer forces.

On 30 June 1975, the 347 TFW was inactivated. The 428 TFS and 429 TFS and associated F-111A aircraft returned to Nellis Air Force Base, Nevada and were reassigned to the 474th Tactical Fighter Wing.

=== Post Vietnam era ===
==== Moody Air Force Base ====
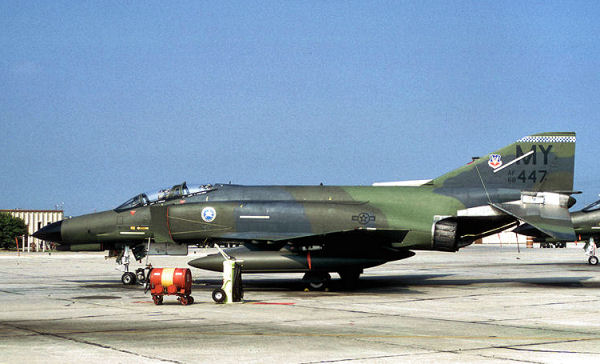
McDonnell Douglas F-4E-39-MC Phantom Serial 68-0447 of the 70th Tactical Fighter Squadron, 1984. This aircraft was retired to AMARC in 1991.

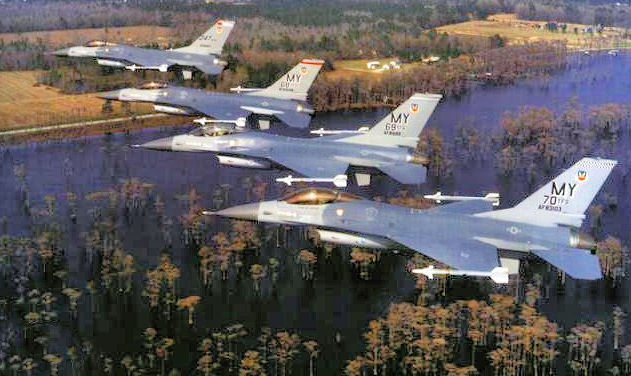
Squadron COs' F-16As of the 347th TFW's 68th, 69th and 70th TFS in formation with the 347th wing flagship.

On 1 December 1975 the 347th Tactical Fighter Wing was reactivated at Moody Air Force Base, Georgia as a tactical fighter wing under Tactical Air Command (TAC). Operational fighter squadrons at Moody were:

- 68th Tactical Fighter Squadron (Tail Code: MY, Red tail stripe)
- 69th Tactical Fighter Squadron (Tail Code: MY, Silver tail stripe)
- 70th Tactical Fighter Squadron (Tail Code: MY, Blue/White checkered tail stripe)

The 347th TFW flew the McDonnell-Douglas F-4E until 1988, upgrading to the Block 15 General Dynamics F-16A/B. In 1990 the Wing upgraded again to the Block 40 F-16C/D. Moody won the Commander-in-Chief's Installation Excellence Award for 1991, and the 1994 Verne Orr Award, which is presented by the Air Force Association to the unit that most effectively uses human resources to accomplish its mission. In June 1997, the 347th TFW was awarded the Air Force Outstanding Unit Award for the eighth time in its illustrious history.

On 1 October 1991, the 347th TFW was redesignated the 347th Fighter Wing (FW). On 1 June 1992 the 347th FW was assigned to the newly activated Air Combat Command (ACC).

As a result of the August 1992 destruction of Homestead AFB Florida by Hurricane Andrew, the 31st Fighter Wing's 307th Fighter Squadron and 308th Fighter Squadron were initially evacuated to Moody Air Force Base prior to the hurricane making landfall. With Homestead unusable for an extended period after the hurricane, on 20 November the squadrons were permanently assigned to the 347th TFW making it the largest F-16 wing in the USAF. On 1 April 1994, the 308th FS was moved without personnel or equipment to the 56th Fighter Wing at Luke AFB, Arizona, replacing the 311th FS. The squadrons Block 40 F-16s were sent to United States Air Forces Europe (USAFE).

On 1 July 1994, the Air Force redesignated the 347th Fighter Wing to the 347th Wing, a force projection, air/land composite wing. Squadrons of the 347th Wing were:

- 52d Airlift Squadron (C-130E) (green tail stripe – ROOS)
  Transferred from inactivated 63d MAW, Norton AFB, California 1 May 1994. Was a C-141B squadron at Norton.
- 68th Fighter Squadron (F-16C/D) (red tail stripe – LANCERS)
- 69th Fighter Squadron (F-16C/D) (black tail stripe – WEREWOLVES)
- 70th Fighter Squadron (A/OA-10A) (blue/white tail stripe – WHITE KNIGHTS)
- 307th Fighter Squadron (F-16C/D) (black tail stripe – STINGERS)

The 307th FS was inactivated on 31 August 1995 when F-16 operations at Moody were reduced in size.

On 1 April 1997 the 347th Wing added a search-and-rescue component with the addition of the 41st Rescue Squadron with HH-60G helicopters and the 71st Rescue Squadron with specialized HC-130P aircraft from Patrick AFB, Florida. To make room for these squadrons, the 52d Airlift Squadron was inactivated, with its C-130s being transferred to the 71st Rescue Squadron (RQS).

The F-16s of the 347th Wing began to be transferred out as the "Composite Wing" concept ended at Moody. The 70th FS was inactivated on 30 June 2000. The 69th FS was inactivated on 2 February 2001, and the 68th FS was inactivated on 1 April. The F-16s were transferred to various active-duty, reserve, and Air National Guard squadrons both in the CONUS as well as overseas.

On 1 May 2001, the 347th Wing stood down as a composite wing and stood up as the 347th Rescue Wing (RQW), becoming the Air Force's only active-duty combat search and rescue wing. The 347th RQW was transferred from ACC to the Air Force Special Operations Command on 1 October 2003.

Replaced Det. 1, 363d Combat Support Group (CSG) at Moody and trained to become proficient in F-4E aircraft. Assumed responsibility for operating Moody in Dec 1975. Thereafter, conducted frequent exercise deployments in the U.S. and overseas to maintain capabilities specializing in air-to-ground attack using precision-guided weapons. Transitioned to F-16A/B aircraft, 1988–1989, and oriented mission planning toward NATO requirements by conducting squadron-strength deployments to Europe.

Began upgrading to F-16C/D in Jan 1990 and in Aug 1990 became first operational TAC unit to employ the LANTIRN all-weather/night navigation and bombing system. Sent support personnel to Southwest Asia in Aug 1990, and in Jan 1991 deployed one fighter squadron to fly combat missions. Following the ceasefire, continued to support peace-keeping operations with periodic aircraft deployments to Saudi Arabia to support Operation Southern Watch and other contingencies.

=== Modern era ===
Became a composite wing in 1994 with the addition of airlift and close air support elements, and as part of the realignment of the post Cold-War Air Force, HQ ACC converted and realigned the 347th Fighter Wing to the 347th Wing (347 WG) on 1 July 1994, with a new mission being that of a force projection, air/land composite wing.

On 1 April 1997 the 347th Wing added a combat search and rescue (CSAR) component with the addition of the 41st Rescue Squadron (41 RQS) with HH-60G helicopters and the 71st Rescue Squadron (71 RQS) with specialized HC-130P aircraft, both units transferring from Patrick AFB, Florida. To make room for these squadrons, the 52d Airlift Squadron was inactivated, with its C-130s being transferred to the 71 RQS.

The F-16s of the 347th Wing began to be transferred out as the "Composite Wing" concept ended at Moody. The 70 FS was inactivated on 30 June 2000, the 69 FS inactivated on 2 February 2001, and the 68 FS was inactivated on 1 April. The F-16s and A-10s/OA-10s were transferred to various active-duty, Air Force Reserve Command and Air National Guard squadrons both in CONUS as well as overseas. On 1 May 2001, the 347th Wing stood down as a composite wing and stood up as the 347th Rescue Wing (347 RQW), becoming the Air Force's only active-duty combat search and rescue wing.

On 1 October 2003, Moody was transferred from Air Combat Command to Air Force Special Operations Command (AFSOC). With the change of assignment the 347th Rescue Wing was transferred from ACC to AFSOC. This was a short-lived experiment that temporarily placed all USAF air rescue assets (Active, Air Force Reserve, and Air National Guard) under AFSOC. On 1 October 2005, the 347 RQW returned to Air Combat Command

The wing was inactivated on 1 October 2006, and its personnel and equipment transferred to the 23d Wing which moved to Moody from Pope Air Force Base, North Carolina.

=== Lineage ===
- Established as 347th Fighter Wing, All Weather on 10 August 1948

Activated on 18 August 1948
Redesignated 347th Fighter-All Weather Wing on 20 January 1950
Inactivated on 24 June 1950

- Redesignated 347th Tactical Fighter Wing and activated on 21 December 1967 (not organied)

Organized on 15 January 1968
Inactivated on 31 October 1972

- Activated on 30 July 1973

Inactivated on 30 June 1975

- Activated on 30 September 1975

Redesignated 347th Fighter Wing on 1 October 1991
Redesignated 347th Wing on 1 July 1994
Redesignated 347th Rescue Wing on 1 May 2001
Inactivated on 1 October 2006

=== Assignments ===
- 315th Composite Wing, 18 August 1948
- Fifth Air Force, 1 March-24 Jun 1950
- Pacific Air Forces, 21 December 1967
- Fifth Air Force, 15 January 1968
- Tactical Air Command, 15 May 1971
- 832d Air Division, 15 May 1971 – 31 October 1972
- Thirteenth Air Force, 30 July 1973 – 30 June 1975 (attached to Seventh Air Force, 30 July 1973, United States Support Activities Group/Seventh Air Force, c. 14 February 1974 – 30 June 1975)
- Ninth Air Force, 30 September 1975
- Air Force Special Operations Command, 1 October 2003 – 1 October 2006

=== Components ===
Groups

- 347th Fighter Group: 18 August 1948 – 24 June 1950
- 1st Rescue Group: 1 April-30 Sep 1997
- 23d Fighter Group: 1 April 1997 – 27 June 2000
- 347th Operations Group: 1 May 1991 – 1 October 2006
- 563d Rescue Group: 1 October 2003 – 1 October 2006

Squadrons

- 34th Tactical Fighter Squadron: 15 January 1968 – 15 March 1971 (detached)
- 35th Tactical Fighter Squadron: 15 January 1968 – 15 March 1971 (detached 22 March-10 June 1968)
- 36th Tactical Fighter Squadron: 15 January 1968 – 15 May 1971
- 68th Tactical Fighter Squadron: 30 September 1975 – 1 May 1991 (detached 30 May-5 Jul 1990)
- 69th Tactical Fighter Training (later, 69 Tactical Fighter) Squadron: 1 July 1983 – 1 May 1991 (detached 8 January-1 May 1991).
- 70th Tactical Fighter Squadron: 30 September 1975 – 1 May 1991 (detached 29 August-28 Sep 1989)
- 80th Tactical Fighter Squadron: 15 January 1968 – 15 March 1971 (detached 15 February-15 Mar 1971)
- 339th Tactical Fighter Squadron: 30 December 1975 – 1 July 1983
- 389th Tactical Fighter Squadron: 15 October 1971 – 31 October 1972
- 390th Tactical Fighter Squadron: 30 June-31 Oct 1972
- 391st Tactical Fighter Squadron: 1 July 1971 – 31 October 1972
- 428th Tactical Fighter Squadron: 30 July 1973 – 15 June 1975
- 429th Tactical Fighter Squadron: 30 July 1973 – 21 June 1975
- 556th Reconnaissance Squadron: 1 July 1968 – 15 May 1971
- 4589th Tactical Fighter Squadron: 1 September-15 Oct 1971
- 4590th Tactical Fighter Squadron: 1 January-30 Jun 1972
- 6091 Reconnaissance Squadron: 15 January-1 Jul 1968

=== Stations ===
- Itazuke Airfield, Japan, 18 August 1948
- Bofu Air Base, Japan, 15 October 1948
- Ashiya Airfield (later Ashuiya Air Base), Japan, 3 May 1949
- Nagoya Air Base, Japan, 1 April-24 Jun 1950
- Yokota Air Base, Japan, 15 January 1968 – 15 May 1971
- Mountain Home Air Force Base, Idaho, 15 May 1971 – 31 October 1972
- Takhli Royal Thai Air Force Base, Thailand, 30 July 1973
- Korat Royal Thai Air Force Base, Thailand, 12 July 1974 – 30 June 1975
- Moody Air Force Base, Georgia, 30 September 1975 – 1 October 2006
- Ching Chuan Kang Air Base, Taiwan, 29 November – 8 December 1968

=== Commanders ===
- Col Daniel A. Cooper, 18 August 1948
- Col Robert D. McCarten, 21 January 1949
- Col Daniel A. Cooper, 3 May 1949
- Col Virgil L. Zoller, 23 June 1949
- Col Walter C. White, 1 April - 24 June 1950
- None (not manned), 21 December 1967 – 14 January 1968
- Col Paul P. Douglas Jr., 15 January 1968
- Col Allen K. McDonald, 23 January 1968
- Col Thomas M. Carhart, 29 January 1968
- Col Irby B. Jarvis Jr., 3 September 1969
- Col William L. Craig, 5 July 1970
- Brig Gen Donald H. Ross, 15 July 1970
- Brig Gen Henry L. Warren, 15 July 1971
- Col Lynwood E. Clark, 10 December 1971 – 31 October 1972
- Col Thomas E. Lacy, 30 July 1973
- Col Cecil D. Crabb, 9 March 1974
- Col Maurice E. Seaver Jr., 21 September 1974
- Col Russell E. Thoburn, 22 March 1975
- Col James D. Covington, 21–30 June 1975
- Col Robert L. Cass, 30 September 1975
- Col Jack I. Gregory, 17 August 1976

=== Aircraft ===
- F-51 Mustang, 1948
- Northrop F-61 Black Widow, 1948–1950
- North American F-82 Twin Mustang, 1949–1950
- F-105 Thunderchief, 1968
- F-4 Phantom II, F-4C 1968–1971
- C-130 Hercules, 1968–1971
- EB-57 Canberra, 1968–1971
- RB-57 Canberra, 1968
- F-111 Aardvark, F-111F 1971–1972; F-111A 1973–1975
- F-4 Phantom II, F-4E 1975–1988
- F-16 Falcon, 1987–2001
- C-130 Hercules, 1994–2006
- A/OA-10 Thunderbolt II, 1995–2000
- HC-130 Hercules, 1997–2006
- HH-60 Pave Hawk, 1997–2006
