= 18th Operations Group =

United States Air Force unit in Japan

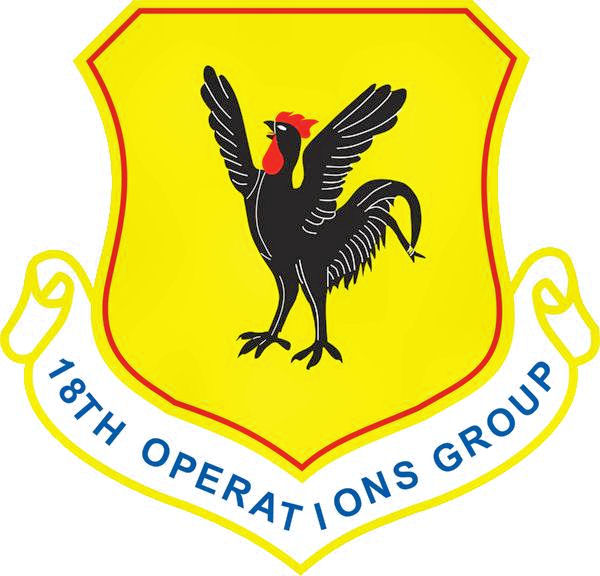
- Emblem of the 18th Operations Group
- Active: 1927–1957; 1978–1981; 1991–present
- Country: United States
- Branch: United States Air Force

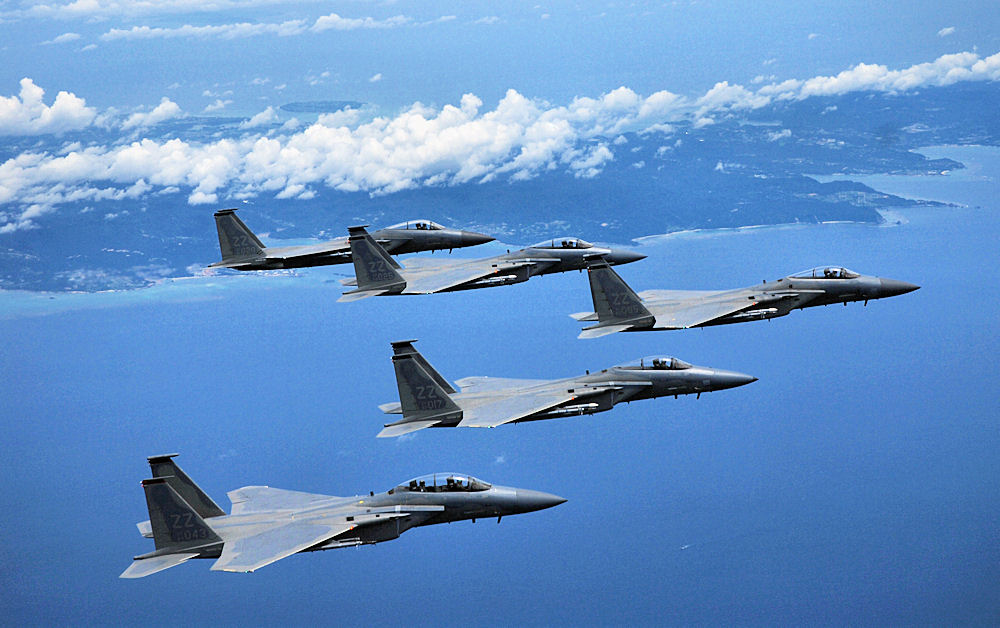
67th FS McDonnell Douglas F-15 Eagles (84-043, 83–017, 83–020, 83–025, 85–095) in formation.

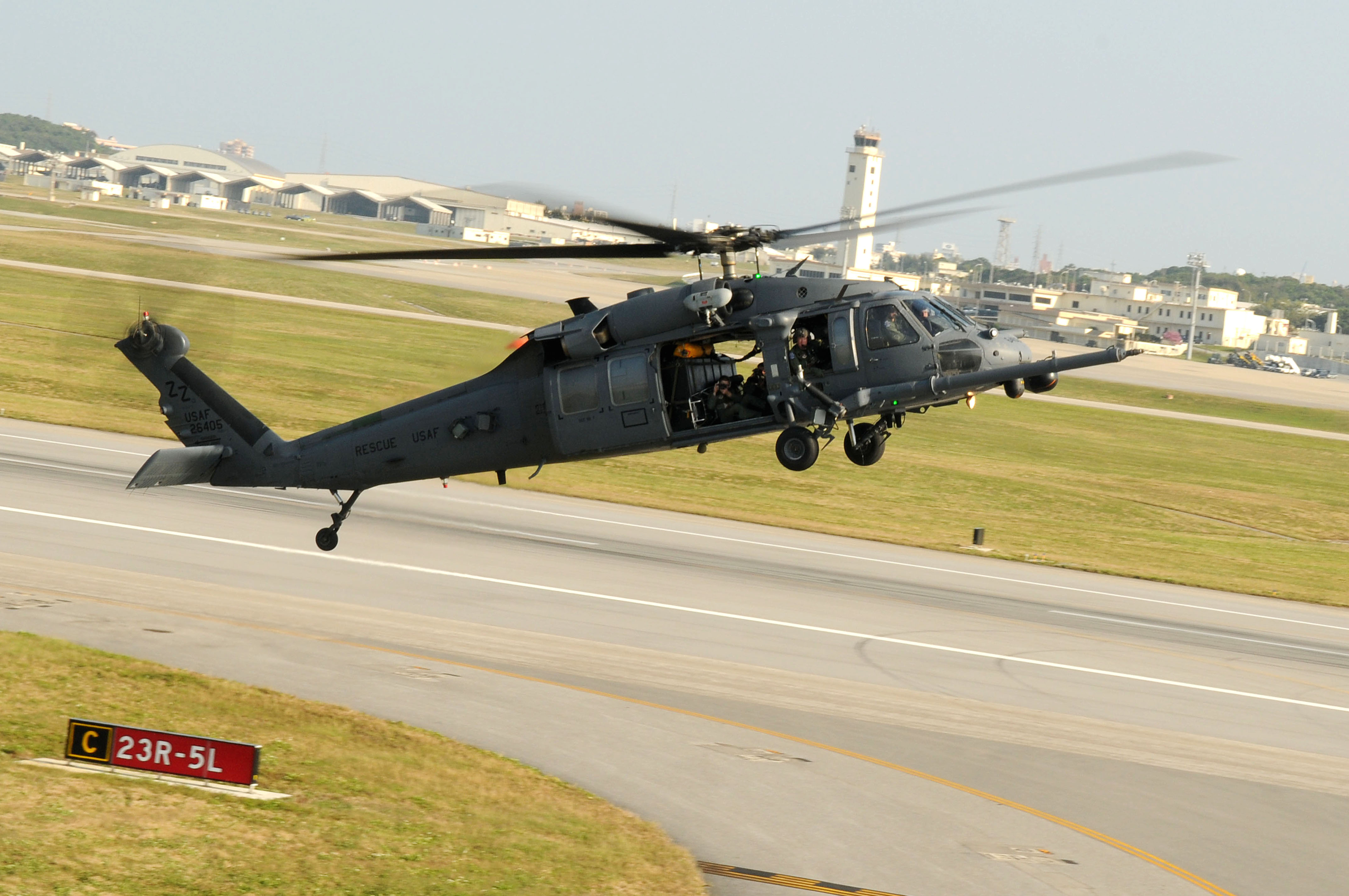
33d RQS Sikorsky HH-60G Pavehawk (91-26405) prepares to land.

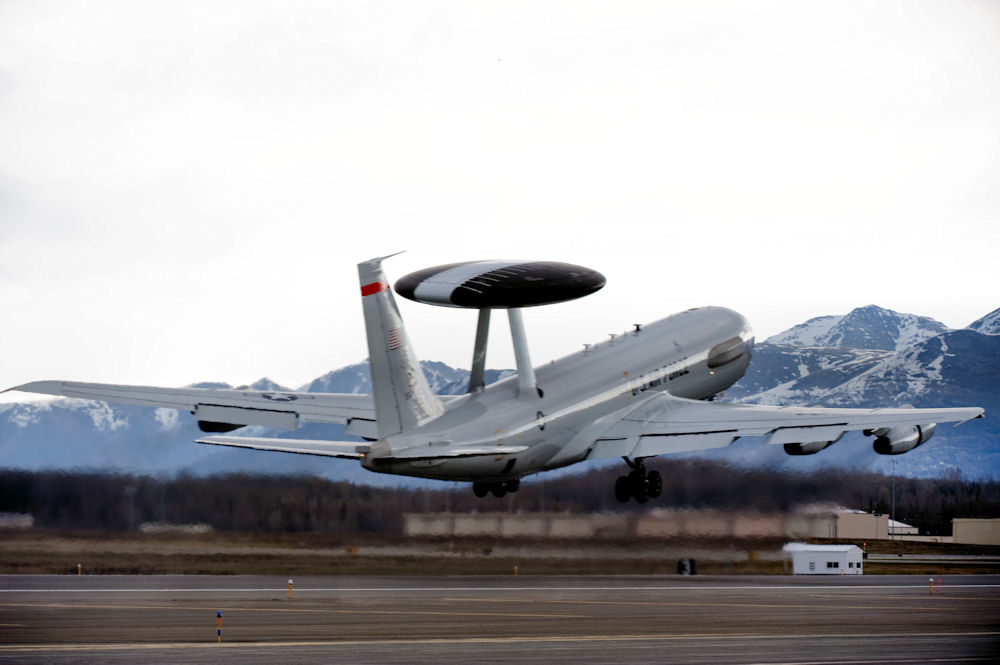
961st AACS Boeing E-3A Sentry taking off.

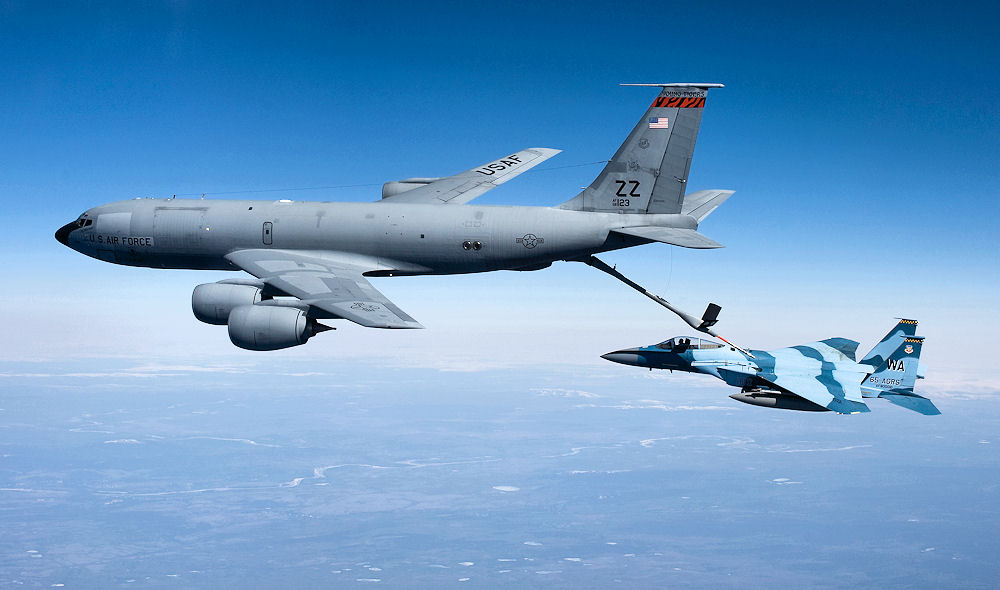
McDonnell Douglas F-15C-27-MC Eagle (80-0010) from the 65th Aggressor Squadron, Nellis Air Force Base, Nevada receives fuel from a Boeing KC-135R-BN Stratotanker (58-0123) assigned to the 909th Air Refueling Squadron

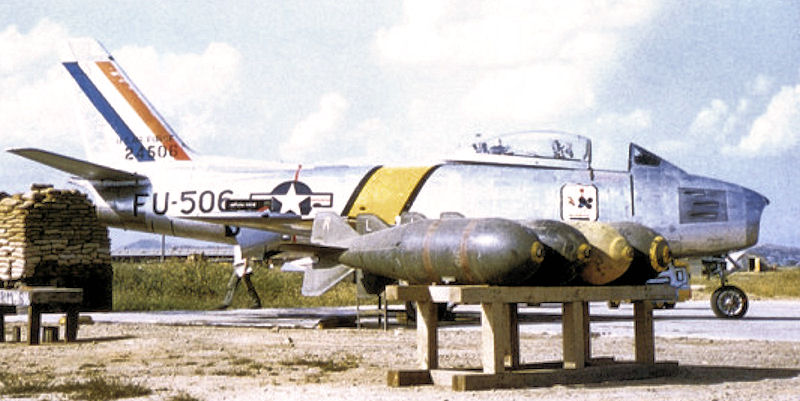
67th Fighter-Bomber Squadron North American F-86F-25-NH Sabre 52-5506, Osan-ni Airfield (K-55), South Korea, 1953

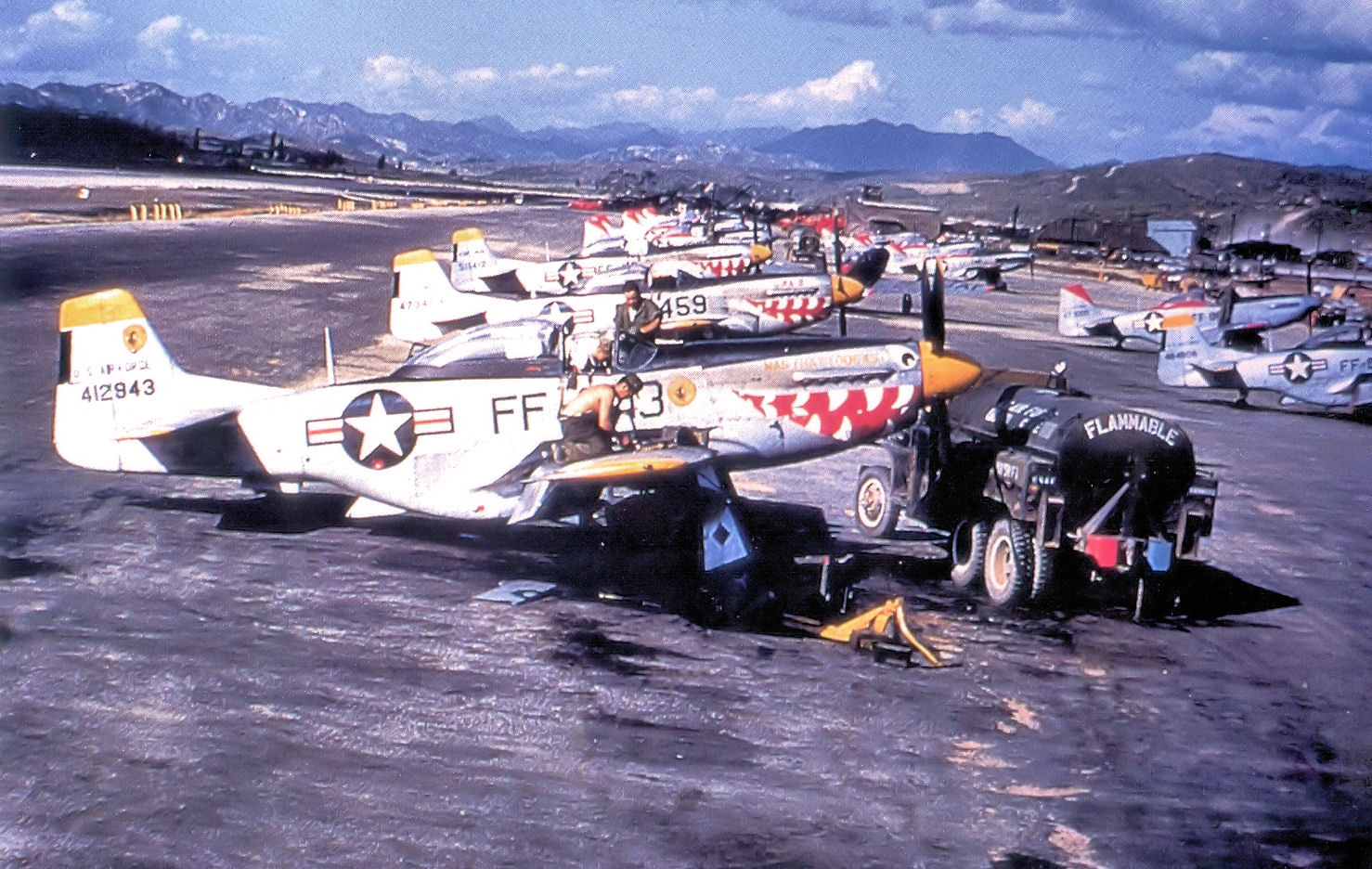
F-51D-20-NT Mustangs at Chinhae Airfield (K-14) South Korea 1951. 44-12943 in foreground

The 18th Operations Group is the operational flying component of the United States Air Force 18th Wing, stationed at Kadena Air Base, Okinawa, Japan.

The 18th OG is the largest combat operations group in the Air Force with eight squadrons, one flight, 842 active-duty members and approximately 80 aircraft, including the F-15 Eagle, E-3 Sentry, KC-135 Stratotanker and the HH-60W Jolly Green II

The group is one of the oldest in the United States Air Force, being a successor organization of the 18th Pursuit Group, one of the 15 original combat air groups formed by the Army before World War II.

== Units ==
The group's ten squadrons (Tail Code: ZZ) include:

- 18th Aeromedical Evacuation Squadron (AES)
- 18th Operations Support Squadron (OSS)
- 44th Fighter Squadron (FS) (F-15 Eagle)
- 67th Fighter Squadron (FS) (F-15 Eagle)
- 31st Rescue Squadron (RQS)
- 33d Rescue Squadron (RQS) (HH-60W Jolley Green II)
- 623d Air Control Squadron (ACS)
- 909th Air Refueling Squadron (ARS) (KC-135R Stratotanker)
- 961st Airborne Air Control Squadron (AACS) (E-3 Sentry)
- 319th Expeditionary Reconnaissance Squadron (ERS) (MQ-9 Reaper)

== History ==
For additional lineage and history, see 18th Wing

=== Heraldry ===
The fighting cock emblem, approved in 1931, symbolizes the courage and aggressiveness of a combat organization.

=== Lineage ===
- Authorized as 18th Pursuit Group on 20 January 1927

Activated on 21 January 1927
Redesignated: 18th Pursuit Group (Interceptor) on 6 December 1939
Redesignated: 18th Fighter Group on 15 May 1942
Redesignated: 18th Fighter Group (Single Engine) on 15 April 1944
Redesignated: 18th Fighter Group, Two Engine, on 15 June 1944
Redesignated: 18th Fighter Group, late 1944
Redesignated: 18th Fighter-Bomber Group on 20 January 1950
Inactivated on 1 October 1957

- Redesignated 18th Tactical Fighter Group on 10 April 1978

Activated on 1 May 1978
Inactivated on 11 February 1981

- Redesignated 18th Operations Group, and activated, on 1 October 1991.

=== Assignments ===
- Hawaiian Department, 21 January 1927
- 14th Pursuit Wing, 1 November 1940
- VII Fighter Command, 23 January 1942
- XIII Fighter Command, 14 April 1943

Attached to: 310th Bombardment Wing, 24 March-26 April 1945

- 85th Fighter Wing, 15 March 1946
- Thirteenth Air Force, 1 May 1947
- 18 Fighter (later, 18 Fighter-Bomber) Wing, 14 August 1948 – 1 October 1957

Attached to: Thirteenth Air Force, 16 May-16 December 1949
Attached to: Fifth Air Force, 28 July-3 August 1950
Attached to: 6002 Fighter [later, 6002 Tactical Support] Wing, 4 August-30 November 1950
Attached to: Twentieth Air Force, 1–9 November 1954
Attached to: Air Task Force 13, Provisional, 3-c. 30 September 1955

- 18th Tactical Fighter Wing, 1 May 1978 – 11 February 1981
- 18th Wing, 1 October 1991–present

=== Components ===
- 1st Special Operations Squadron: 1 May 1978 – 15 January 1981 (detached 1–15 January 1981)
- 2 Squadron (South African Air Force): attached 19 November 1950 – 24 March 1951; attached c. 22 April 1951 – 6 November 1953
- 6th Pursuit (later, 6th Fighter; 6th Night Fighter): January 1927-16 March 1943
- 12th Fighter (later, 12th Fighter-Bomber; 12th Tactical Fighter, 12th Fighter): 30 March 1943 – 2 September 1957 (not operational, 26 March-2 October 1947; not operational, 10–31 July 1950; detached 27 January-19 February 1955, c. 3 September-30 November 1955, 7 August 1956 – 14 March 1957, 15 March-15 August 1957, 16 August-2 September 1957); 1 May 1978 – 11 February 1981; 1 October 1991 – 28 April 2000
- 13th Airlift: 1 June 1992 – 1 October 1993
- 15th Tactical Reconnaissance: 1 May 1978 – 11 February 1981
- 19th Pursuit (later, 19th Fighter): January 1927-16 March 1943
- 25th Tactical Fighter Squadron: 1 May 1978 – 11 February 1981 (not operational, 22 August 1980 – 1 February 1981)
- 26th Attack (later, 26th Bombardment) Squadron: attached 1 September 1930-c. 10 December 1939
- 31st Rescue: 31 July 2003–present
- 33d Rescue: 1 February 1993–present
- 36th Pursuit Squadron: 30 June 1931 – 15 June 1932 (detached entire period)
- 37th Pursuit Squadron: 15 June 1932 – 1 March 1935 (not operational, 15 June 1932 – 31 August 1933; manned, but detached, 1 September 1933 – 1 March 1935)
- 38th Pursuit Squadron: 15 June 1932 – 1 March 1935 (not operational, 15 June 1932 – 31 July 1933; manned, but detached, 1 August 1933 – 1 March 1935)
- 39th Fighter-Interceptor Squadron: attached 25 May 1951 – 31 May 1952
- 44th Pursuit (later, 44th Fighter; 44th Fighter-Bomber; 44th Tactical Fighter, 44th Fighter): 1 January 1941 – 15 October 1942; 30 March 1943 – 1 October 1957 (not operational, 26 March-2 October 1947; detached 28 July-30 November 1950, 1 December 1950 – 10 November 1954, 11 December 1954 – 26 January 1955, 27 January-16 February 1955, 17 February – 14 July 1955, 3–30 September 1955, 15–18 April 1956, 1 February-1 October 1957); 1 May 1978 – 11 February 1981; 1 October 1991–present
- 67th Fighter (later, 67th Fighter-Bomber; 67th Tactical Fighter; 67th Fighter) Squadron: 1 November 1945 – 1 October 1957 (not operational, 14 February-15 April 1946; not operational, 25 March-2 October 1947; detached 27 January-16 February 1955, 1 July-1 October 1955, 1 February-1 October 1957); 1 May 1978 – 11 February 1981; 1 October 1991–present
- 68th Fighter Squadron: 1 November-15 December 1945
- 70th Fighter Squadron: 30 March 1943 – 1 November 1945
- 73d Pursuit Squadron: 8 May 1929 – 15 July 1931 (not operational entire period)
- 73d Pursuit (later, 73d Fighter): 5 October 1941 – 15 October 1942
- 74th Pursuit Squadron: 8 May 1929 – 15 July 1931 (not operational entire period)
- 78th Pursuit (later, 78th Fighter) Squadron: 1 February 1940 – 16 March 1943
- 333d Fighter Squadron: 23 August 1942 – 11 January 1943
- 336th Fighter-Day Squadron: attached 7 August 1956 – 1 February 1957
- 419th Night Fighter Squadron: 21 November 1943 – 25 August 1944
- 623d Air Control Squadron: 1 October 1991 – present
- 909th Air Refueling Squadron: 1 October 1991–present
- 961st Airborne Warning and Control (later, 961st Airborne Air Control): 1 October 1991–present

=== Stations ===
- Wheeler Field, Hawaii (Territory), 21 January 1927
- Pekoa Airfield, Espiritu Santo, New Hebrides, 11 March 1943
- Carney Airfield, Guadalcanal, Solomon Islands, 17 April 1943
- Sansapor (Mar) Airfield, New Guinea, 23 August 1944
- Lingayen Airfield, Lingayen Luzon, Philippines, c. 13 January 1945
- McGuire Field, San Jose, Mindoro, Philippines, c. 1 March 1945
- San Roque Airfield (Moret Field), Zamboanga City, Mindanao, Philippines,4 May 1945
- Puerto Princesa Airfield, Palawan, Philippines, 10 November 1945
- Floridablanca Airfield (Basa Air Base), Floridablanca, Luzon, Philippines, March 1946
- Clark Field (later, AFB), Luzon, Philippines, 16 September 1947
- Taegu AB (K-2), South Korea, 28 July 1950
- Ashiya AB, Japan, 8 August 1950
- Pusan East (K-9) Air Base, South Korea, 8 September 1950
- Pyongyang East Airfield (K-24), North Korea, c. 21 November 1950
- Suwon AB (K-13), South Korea, 1 December 1950
- Chinhae Airfield (K-10), South Korea, 9 December 1950

Operated from: Pusan West AB (K-1), South Korea, 24 March-22 April 1951
Operated from: Suwon AB (K-13), South Korea, 24 March-8 May 1951
Operated from: Seoul AB (K-16), South Korea, 8 May-9 August 1951 and c. 19 August-30 September 1951
Operated from: Hoengsong Airfield (K-46), South Korea, 1 October 1951 – 1 June 1952

- Hoengsong Airfield (K-46), South Korea, 2 June 1952
- Osan-ni Airfield (K-55), South Korea, 11 January 1953
- Kadena AB, Okinawa, 1 November 1954 – 1 October 1957

Deployed at: Yonton Auxiliary AB, Okinawa, 10 November-11 December 1954
Deployed at: Chai-Yi AB, Formosa, 29 January-16 February 1955 and 3-c. 30 September 1955

- Kadena AB, Japan, 1 May 1978 – 11 February 1981; 1 October 1991–present; Deployed to Ching Chuan Kang Air Base, Taiwan, 6 November 1972 – 30 May 1975

=== Aircraft ===
- DH-4, 1927–1930
- PW-9, 1927–1938
- Fokker C-2, 1928–1930
- A-3, 1930–1936
- P-12, 1930–1941
- OA-3, c. 1936–1941
- A-12, 1936–1941
- B-12, c. 1938–1941
- P-26, 1938–1941
- P-36, 1938–1941
- OA-9, 1939–1941
- P-40, 1940–1943
- B-18, 1942
- P-39, 1942–1944
- P-70, 1942–1944
- P-38, 1943–1946
- P-400, 1943
- P-47, 1944, 1946, 1947–1948
- A-24, 1944
- P-61, 1944
- P (later, F)-51, 1946–1947, 1948–1953
- P (later, F)-80, 1946–1947; 1949–1950
- F-86, 1953–1957
- F-84, 1956–1957
- F-4, 1978–1980; RF-4, 1978–1981
- MC-130, 1978–1981
- F-15, 1979–1981; 1991–present
- E-3, 1991–present
- KC-135, 1991–present
- C-12, 1992–1993
- HH-3, 1993–1994
- HH-60, 1993–present

=== Operations ===
==== Origins ====
The 18th Wing has the unique distinction of being the only wing never stationed in the Continental United States. 18th Wing heritage began on 21 January 1927, when the War Department activated a provisional pursuit group at Wheeler Field, Hawaii. Shortly thereafter the group was re-designated the 18th Pursuit Group with the following squadrons:

- 6th Pursuit Squadron (assigned January 1927)
- 19th Pursuit Squadron (assigned January 1927)

The "fighting cock" Group insignia with "Unguibus et Rostro", "With Talon and Beak" was chosen by 18th Pursuit Group CO Maj. Carlyle H. Walsh in February 1931, and officially approved in 1932. Major Kenneth M. Walker (for whom Walker AFB, New Mexico was later named) assumed command in March 1940, having on his staff Captain Roger W. Ramey (for whom Ramey AFB Puerto Rico was named), and Lieutenants Bruce K. Holloway, K. P. Bocquist, John G. Simpson, and William F. Savidge.

The Group was flying Boeing P-26 Peashooters, then upgraded into the radial-engined Curtiss P-36 Hawks before being re-equipped with Curtiss P-40s a few months prior to the attack on Pearl Harbor by Japanese naval aircraft which immediately drew the United States into World War II.

In the immediate months before the Pearl Harbor attack, the group was expanded as follows:

- 6th Pursuit Squadron (Interceptor) (P-40B)
- 19th Pursuit Squadron (Interceptor) (P-40B, P-40C)
- 44th Pursuit Squadron (Interceptor) (P-40B, P-40C) (At Bellows Field)
- 72nd Pursuit Squadron (Interceptor) (none)
- 73rd Pursuit Squadron (Interceptor) (P-40B)
- 78th Pursuit Squadron (Interceptor) (P-40B)

==== World War II ====
The Imperial Japanese attack on 7 December 1941, severely hurt the group – its only two P-40C Warhawks of the 44th Pursuit Squadron to get airborne were immediately shot down, and the rest of the group's aircraft were heavily damaged. Over 60 P-40Cs were destroyed on the ground at Wheeler. The group, assigned to Seventh Air Force in February 1942, had to be re-equipped before it could resume training and begin patrol missions.

During March 1943, the group moved to the South Pacific Theater and rejoined the war effort as part of Thirteenth Air Force and began operations from Guadalcanal. Flew protective patrols over US bases in the Solomons; later, escorted bombers to the Bismarcks, supported ground forces on Bougainville, and attacked enemy airfields and installations in the northern Solomons and New Britain. Used Lockheed P-38 Lightnings; Bell P-39 Airacobra; Northrop P-61 Black Widows, and Douglas P-70 Havoc aircraft. The following operational squadrons were assigned to the 18th Fighter Group:

- 6th Night Fighter Squadron (P-70)
- 12th Fighter Squadron (P-39)
- 44th Fighter Squadron (P-38)
- 70th Fighter Squadron (P-39)
- 419th Night Fighter Squadron (P-38, P-61)

The 18th FG moved to New Guinea in August 1944 equipped with P-38s. Escorted bombers to targets in the southern Philippines and Borneo, and attacked enemy airfields and installations in the Netherlands Indies. Received a Distinguished Unit Citation for actions at Ormoc Bay: on 10 November 1944 the group withstood intense flak and vigorous opposition from enemy interceptors to attack a Japanese convoy that was attempting to bring in additional troops for use against American forces that had landed on Leyte; on the following day a few of the group's planes returned to the same area, engaged a large force of enemy fighters, and destroyed a number of them.

Moved to the Philippines in January 1945. Supported ground forces on Luzon and Borneo, attacked shipping in the central Philippines, covered landings on Palawan, attacked airfields and railways on Formosa, and escorted bombers to such widely scattered targets as Borneo, French Indochina, and Formosa.

At the end of the war, the group moved to Clark Field on Luzon and became part of Far East Air Forces after the war. Flew patrols and trained with Lockheed F-80 Shooting Stars, with the distinction of being the first overseas fighter unit to be jet-equipped.

The group lost all personnel in March 1947 but was re-manned in September 1947. Equipped first with Republic F-47 Thunderbolts, later with North American F-51 Mustangs, and still later (1949) with F-80s.

In August 1948, it became a subordinate unit to the newly activated 18th Fighter Wing. On 20 January 1950, the wing was re-designated the 18th Fighter-Bomber Wing.

==== Korean War ====
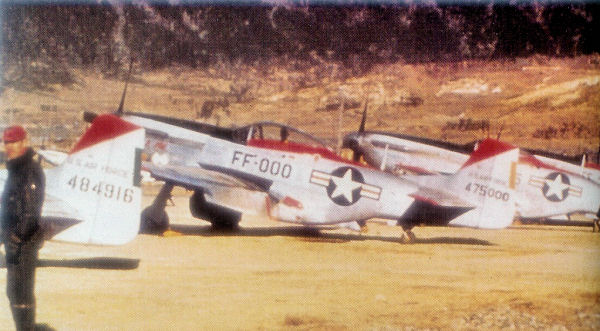
North American F-51D-25-NT Mustangs of the 67th Fighter-Bomber Squadron. Serials 44-84916 and 44-75000 identifiable.

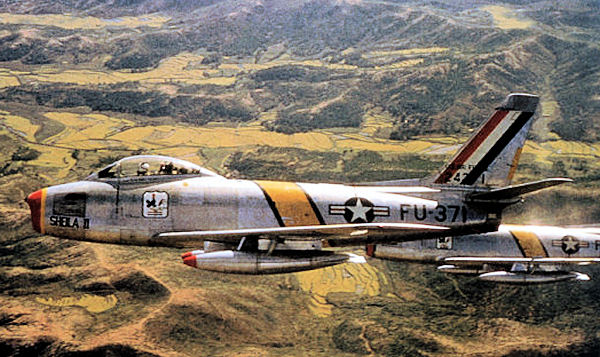
North American F-86F-25-NH Sabre 52-5371 of the 18th Fighter-Bomber Group, 1953. Aircraft marked as Wing Commander's.

The 18th Fighter-Bomber Wing was reassigned to Korea in July 1950 and entered combat. Its organization was as follows:

- 12th Fighter-Bomber Squadron (F-80C, F-51D, F-86F)
- 67th Fighter-Bomber Squadron (F-80C, F-51D, F-86F)
- 39th Fighter Interceptor Squadron (March 1951 – March 1952) (F-51D)
- 2nd Squadron, South African Air Force (November 1950 – March 1951, April 1951 – June 1953) (F-51D)

At the outbreak of the Korean War, the 18th FBG's 12th FBS provided personnel to form the "Dallas" fighter squadron, which rushed into battle. In late July, the group headquarters with two of its squadrons (12th and 67th FBSs) deployed with F-80s from the Philippines to Taegu AB (K-2), South Korea.

From 28 July to 3 August, the 18th Group operated directly under Fifth Air Force then passed to the control of the 6002nd Fighter (later, Tactical Support) Wing. Pilots exchanged their F-80s for F-51 Mustangs. Combat targets included tanks and armored vehicles, locomotives and trucks, artillery and antiaircraft guns, fuel and ammunition dumps, warehouses and factories, and troop concentrations.

In August, advancing enemy forces and insufficient aircraft parking at Taegu forced the group to move to Japan, but it returned to South Korea the following month to support UN forces in a counteroffensive. Because the front advanced so rapidly, operations from Pusan (K-9) soon became impractical, and the group moved in November to Pyongyang East (K-24), North Korea. The 2nd SAAF Squadron joined the 18th in mid-November.

Maj Louis Sebille was posthumously awarded the Medal of Honor for his action on 5 August 1950: although his plane was badly damaged by flak while attacking a concentration of enemy trucks, Maj Sebille continued his strafing passes until he crashed into an armored vehicle.

The Chinese Communist (CCF intervention) caused the group to move twice in as many weeks, first to Suwon AB (K-13), South Korea, then to Chinhae (K-10). From there the 18th FBG continued to support ground forces and carry out armed reconnaissance and interdiction missions. From November 1950 through January 1951, it earned a Distinguished Unit Citation for destroying roughly 2,400 enemy vehicles and severely damaging almost 500 more.

From early 1951 until January 1953, the group and its tactical squadrons, moving from base to base in South Korea, operated separately from the rest of the 18th FBW. The group earned its second Distinguished Unit Citation from 22 April to 8 July 1951, when it flew 6,500 combat sorties while operating from sod, dirt filled, and damaged runways to counter the enemy's 1951 spring offensive.

When in January 1953 the group rejoined the wing at Osan-ni AB (K-55), its squadrons transitioned to F-86 Sabrejets without halting the fight against the enemy. It flew its first F-86 counter air mission on 26 February 1953. In the final days of the war, the 18th FBG attacked dispersed enemy aircraft at Sinuiju and Uiju Airfields.

The group remained in Korea for some time after the armistice.

==== Cold War ====
In 1955, deployed to Formosa to support Nationalist Chinese evacuation of Tachen Islands. During subsequent active periods from 1978 to 1981 trained for air operations in western Pacific region

==== Modern era ====
The designation of the wing changed on 1 October 1991 to the 18th Wing with the implementation of the Objective Wing concept. With the objective wing, the mission of the 18th expanded to the Composite Air Wing concept of multiple different wing missions with different aircraft. The operational squadrons of the wing were assigned to the 18th Operations Group.

The mission of the 18th OG was expanded to include aerial refueling with Boeing KC-135R/T Stratotanker tanker aircraft (909th ARS); and surveillance, warning, command and control Boeing E-3B/C Sentry (961st AACS), and communications. Added airlift mission in June 1992 with the Beech C-12 Huron, transporting mission critical personnel, high-priority cargo and distinguished visitors.

In February 1993, the 18th gained responsibility for coordinating rescue operations in the Western Pacific and Indian Ocean with the addition of the 33d Rescue Squadron (33d RQS).

In November 1999, the 18th underwent another change as one of its three F-15 units, the 12th Fighter Squadron, was reassigned to the 3d Wing at Elmendorf Air Force Base, Alaska.

On 15 November 2026, the 18th OG received the first two of thirty-six F-15EXs to equip both the 44th & 69th fighter squadrons.
