= 43rd Air Division =

43d Air Division

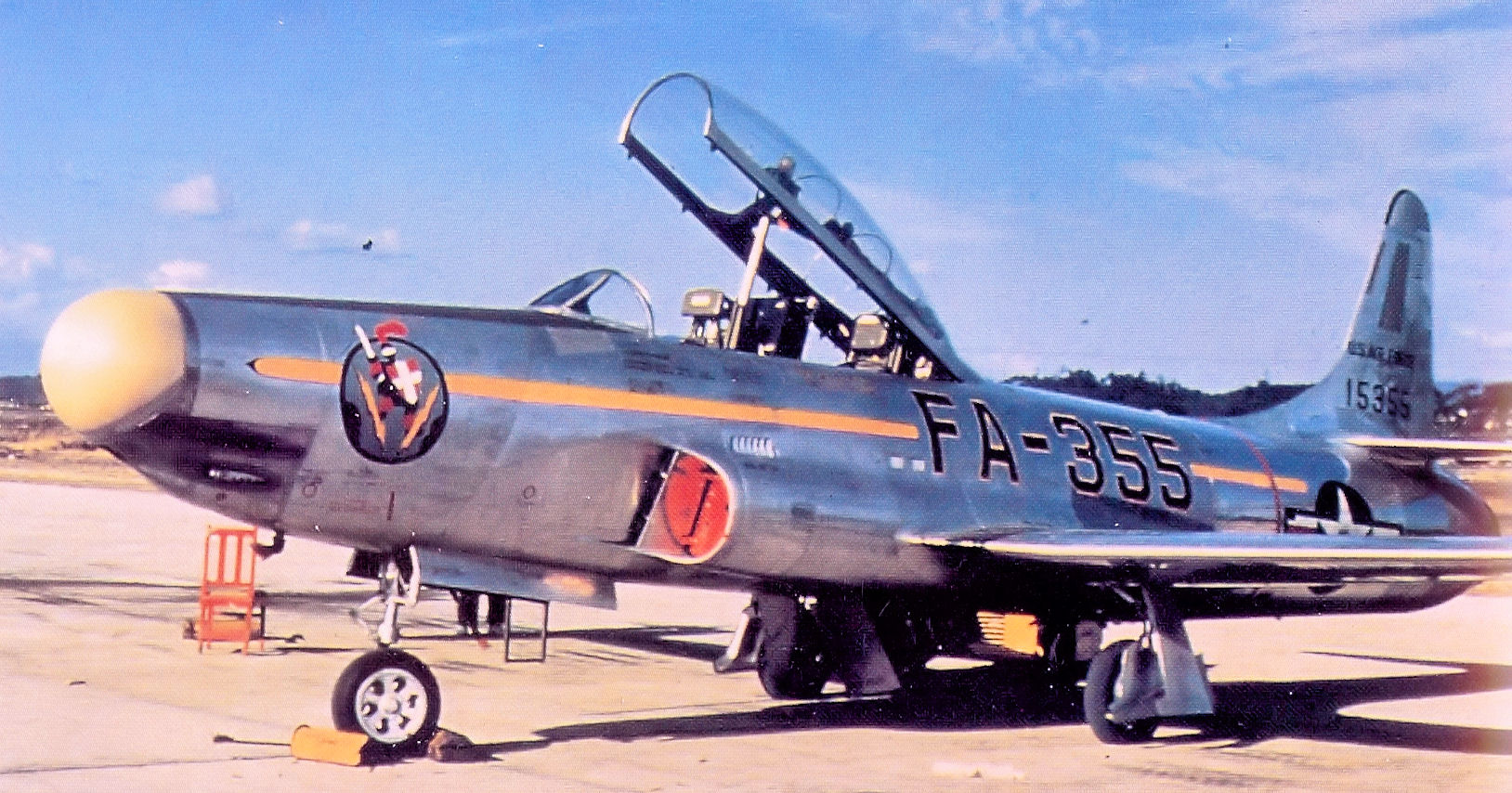
- 68th Fighter-Interceptor Squadron F-94B at Itazuke AB
- Active: 1952–1957
- Country: United States
- Branch: United States Air Force

Insignia
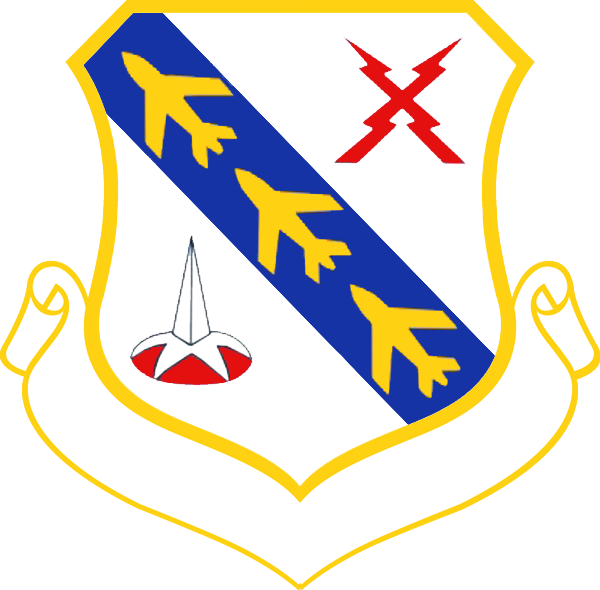
- 43d Air Division emblem (Approved 19 December 1956)

The 43d Air Division is an inactive unit of the United States Air Force. It was last active on 1 October 1957, when it was stationed at Itazuke Air Base, Japan

== History ==
Originally designated as the 43d Air Division (Defense) when organized on 1 March 1952, the division was redesignated 43d Air Division on 18 March 1955. The unit was discontinued and inactivated, on 1 October 1957. The 43d Air Division assumed responsibility for the air defense of Southwestern Japan (Kyūshū, in March 1952. The 43d also included the western part of Honshū, and most of Shikoku), using radar, fighter aircraft, and ground weapons to prevent or disrupt enemy air attacks. "It supported numerous exercises, some involving U.S. and British naval vessels, and training for the Japan Air Self Defense Force. The division also supervised electronic countermeasures, and weather reconnaissance missions. In the summer of 1957, when the Nagasaki area suffered severe flooding, the 43d assisted Japanese authorities and people by flying numerous airlift missions with helicopters and fixed-wing aircraft."

== Lineage ==
- Established as the 43d Air Division (Defense) and organized on 1 March 1952
- Redesignated 43d Air Division on 18 March 1955
- Discontinued and inactivated on 1 October 1957

=== Assignments ===
- Japan Air Defense Force, 1 March 1952;
- Fifth Air Force, 1 September 1954 – 1 October 1957

=== Components ===
Wings

- 8th Fighter-Bomber Wing: 1 March 1955 – 1 October 1957

Squadrons

- 68th Fighter-Interceptor Squadron: 1 March 1955 – 1 October 1957

==== Aircraft ====
- Lockheed F-94 Starfire (1952–1953)
- North American F-86 Sabre (1953–1957)
- North American F-100 Super Sabre (1957)

=== Commanders ===
- Col. Charles W. Stark, 1 March 1952
- Col. Edward N. Backus, c.1954
- Col. Samuel J. Gormly Jr., by 31 December 1954
- Col. James M. Smelley, 9 July 1956
- Col. Ladson G. Eskridge Jr., 13 August 1956 – 1 October 1957

== See also ==
- Fifth Air Force
- List of United States Air Force air divisions
