= Sansapor Airfield =

Former WWII airfield in Indonesia

- Part of Fifth Air Force
- Located in Werur, Tambrauw Regency, Southwest Papua, Indonesia
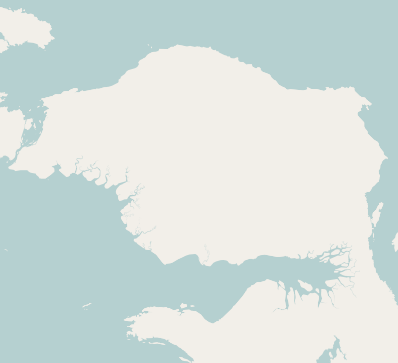
- Location in Southwest Papua Location in Bird's Head Peninsula

Site information
- Type: Military airfield
- Controlled by: United States Army Air Forces

Location
- Coordinates: 00°25′05.71″S 132°11′32.50″E

Site history
- Built: 1944
- In use: 1944-1945

Sansapor Airfield (also known as Mar Airfield) is a former World War II airfield located in the village of Werur, in Tambrauw Regency, Southwest Papua, Indonesia. The airfield was abandoned after the war and has almost been reclaimed by nature. Since 2014 the field is being rebuilt to airport status.

== History ==
The US Army landed unopposed in the area on 31 July 1944. The airfield was built soon after the landing as a forward operational facility.

=== USAAF units assigned to Sansapor ===
- 86th Fighter Wing (19 August 1944 – 16 January 1945)
- 42d Bombardment Group, (16 September 1944 – 22 February 1945)

Headquarters, 69th, 75th, 100th, 390th Bombardment Squadrons, B-25 Mitchell

- 12th Fighter Squadron (18th Fighter Group), (23 August-13 January 1945), P-38 Lightning
- 70th Fighter Squadron (18th Fighter Group), (23 August-19 January 1945), P-38 Lightning
- 347th Fighter Group, (15 August-19 September 1944)
- Headquarters, 339th Fighter Squadron, P-38 Lightning

== See also ==
- USAAF in the Southwest Pacific
