= Moody Air Force Base =

U.S. Air Force base in Georgia, US

- Near Valdosta, Georgia in the United States of America
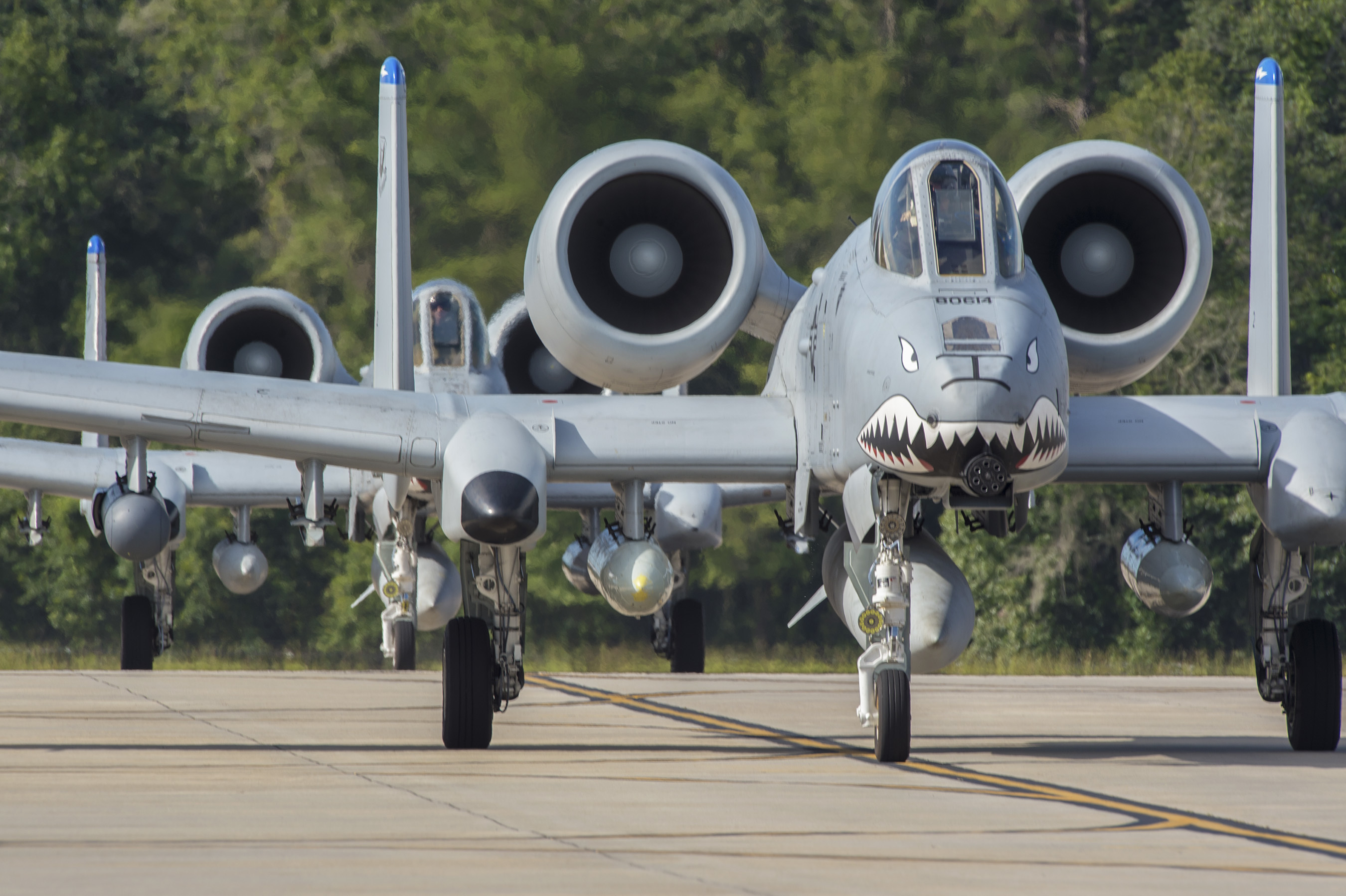
- A-10C Thunderbolt II aircraft assigned to the 74th Fighter Squadron taxiing at Moody Air Force Base in 2017.

Site information
- Type: US Air Force base
- Owner: Department of Defense
- Operator: US Air Force
- Controlled by: Air Combat Command
- Condition: Operational
- Website: www.moody.af.mil/

Location
- Location within North America Location within the United States Location within Georgia
- Coordinates: 30°58′07″N 83°11′35″W

Site history
- Built: 1941 (as Moody Field)
- In use: 1941 – present

Garrison information
- Garrison: 23rd Wing (Host); 93d Air Ground Operations Wing

Airfield information
- Identifiers: IATA: VAD, ICAO: KVAD, FAA LID: VAD, WMO: 747810
- Elevation: 71 metres (233 ft) AMSL
Runways
Direction	Length and surface
18L/36R	2,835 metres (9,301 ft) Concrete
18R/36L	2,439 metres (8,002 ft) PEM

Moody Air Force Base (AFB) (IATA: VAD, ICAO: KVAD, FAA LID: VAD) is a United States Air Force installation near Valdosta, Georgia.

== Geography ==
The base is mostly in northeastern Lowndes County, Georgia, with a portion in Lanier County. Georgia State Route 125 runs through the western side of the base, leading southwest 11 miles (18 km) to the center of Valdosta and northeast 6 miles (10 km) to Ray City.

A portion of the Air Force base in Lowndes County is counted as a census-designated place for statistical purposes. According to the U.S. Census Bureau, the CDP has an area of 4.1 square miles (10.5 km^{2}), with a residential population at the 2020 census of 1,307.

== History ==
The 29th Training Wing was established at Moody Field in 1941 for primary flight training. Initially called Valdosta Airfield in June 1941, it was renamed Moody Army Air Field on 6 December 1941. The installation's namesake, Major George Moody (1908–1941), was a U.S. Army Air Corps test pilot who died on 5 May 1941 in a crash of the prototype Beech Model 25 twin-engine trainer aircraft on its first test flight in Wichita, Kansas. The Model 25 eventually became the AT-10 "Wichita", flown extensively at Moody Field during WWII.

On 1 May 1945 Moody was transferred to the First Air Force. On 1 November 1945 Moody was transferred to Army Air Forces Training Command. On 1 September 1947 Moody was transferred to Tactical Air Command. On 13 January 1948 the base was redesignated Moody Air Force Base. On 1 December 1948 the base was transferred to Continental Air Command. On 1 April 1951 Moody AFB was transferred to Strategic Air Command (SAC).

=== Air Training Command (1951–75) ===
On 1 September 1951 Moody AFB was transferred from SAC to Air Training Command and the 3550th Training Wing (Interceptor Aircrew) was established there. In 1952 Moody was assigned to undertake combat crew training. In July 1957, following the cessation of interceptor training at Tyndall Air Force Base, advanced interceptor training and Tyndall's F-86D Sabres were transferred to Moody, while Moody's F-89Ds were transferred to James Connally Air Force Base. On 3 November 1960 Moody stopped interceptor training and became a consolidated pilot training school.

In 1961 following the closure of Graham Air Base, Moody became responsible for foreign pilot training. From 1962 onwards, increasing numbers of Republic of Vietnam Air Force pilots were trained on Moody's 30 T-28 Trojans. In 1963 foreign pilot training was moved to Randolph Air Force Base.

On 1 December 1973 the 3550th Training Wing was inactivated and replaced by the new 38th Flying Training Wing.

On 1 December 1975 Moody AFB was transferred from Air Training Command to Tactical Air Command and the 38th Flying Training Wing was inactivated.

=== Tactical Air Command (1975–1992) ===
On 30 September 1975 the 347th Tactical Fighter Wing moved to Moody AFB from Korat Royal Thai Air Force Base.

On 1 October 1991 the 347th Tactical Fighter Wing was redesignated the 347th Fighter Wing.

=== Air Combat Command (1992–2003) ===
On 1 July 1994 was redesignated the 347th Wing, a composite wing with fighter, close air support and airlift elements.

On 1 April 1997 the 41st Rescue Squadron and the 71st Rescue Squadron moved to Moody from Patrick Air Force Base and the 23d Wing was assigned to the 347th Wing.

On 30 June 2000 the 70th Fighter Squadron was inactivated at Moody. On 2 February 2001 the 69th Fighter Squadron was inactivated at Moody. On 30 April 2001 the 68th Fighter Squadron was inactivated at Moody.

On 1 May 2001 the 38th Rescue Squadron was activated at Moody and the 347th Wing was redesignated the 347th Rescue Wing.

=== Air Education and Training Command (2000–07) ===
On 31 July 2000 the 479th Flying Training Group was reactivated at Moody to conduct primary Specialized Undergraduate Pilot Training and Introduction to Fighter Fundamentals training. On 2 April 2001 the 39th Flying Training Squadron was activated at Moody and it was joined by the 3d Flying Training Squadron. On 1 October 2001 the 435th Flying Training Squadron also moved to Moody.

On 21 July 2007 the 479th Flying Training Group was inactivated and its aircraft and equipment were redistributed to other AETC units.

=== Air Force Special Operations Command (2003–06) ===
On 1 October 2003 the 347th Rescue Wing was assigned to Air Force Special Operations Command.

=== Air Combat Command (2006–present) ===
On 1 October 2006 the 23rd Fighter Group was redesignated as the 23d Wing and activated at Moody AFB. On the same date the 347th Rescue Wing was inactivated and the 347th Operations Group was redesignated the 347th Rescue Group which became a subordinate element of the 23d Wing.

The 23rd Wing inactivated the 23rd Aircraft Maintenance Squadron in January 2022 while at the same time activating the 74th and 75th Fighter Generation Squadrons. The move was part of Air Combat Command's plans to improve the alignment of fighter operations and maintenance.

In June 2023, the USAF announced that two squadrons of Lockheed Martin F-35 Lightning II will be based at Moody AFB from 2029 to replace the 23rd Fighter Group's A-10C Thunderbolt IIs.

== Based units ==
Flying and notable non-flying units based at Moody Air Force Base.

Units marked GSU are Geographically Separate Units, which although based at Moody, are subordinate to a parent unit based at another location.

=== United States Air Force ===
Air Combat Command (ACC)

- Fifteenth Air Force
  - 23rd Wing
    - 23rd Fighter Group
      - 74th Fighter Squadron – A-10C Thunderbolt II
      - 75th Fighter Squadron – A-10C Thunderbolt II
      - 23rd Operations Support Squadron
    - 23rd Maintenance Group
      - 23rd Maintenance Squadron
      - 23rd Maintenance Operations Flight
      - 74th Fighter Generation Squadron
      - 75th Fighter Generation Squadron
      - 563rd Maintenance Squadron
      - 71st Rescue Generation Squadron
      - 763rd Maintenance Squadron
    - 23rd Medical Group
      - 23rd Aerospace Medicine Squadron
      - 23rd Medical Operations Squadron
      - 23rd Medical Support Squadron
    - 23rd Mission Support Group
      - 23rd Civil Engineer Squadron
      - 23rd Communications Squadron
      - 23rd Contracting Squadron
      - 23rd Force Support Squadron
      - 23rd Logistics Readiness Squadron
      - 23rd Security Forces Squadron
    - 347th Rescue Group
      - 38th Rescue Squadron
      - 41st Rescue Squadron – HH-60W Pave Hawk
      - 71st Rescue Squadron – HC-130J Combat King II
      - 347th Operations Support Squadron
  - 93d Air Ground Operations Wing
    - 820th Base Defense Group
      - 820th Combat Operations Squadron
      - 822d Base Defense Squadron
      - 823d Base Defense Squadron
      - 824th Base Defense Squadron

Air Force Reserve Command (AFRC)

- Tenth Air Force
  - 442nd Fighter Wing
    - 476th Fighter Group (GSU)
      - 76th Fighter Squadron – A-10C Thunderbolt II
      - 476th Aerospace Medical Flight
      - 476th Maintenance Squadron

== Demographics ==
Moody Air Force Base
- Census-designated place
- Location within Georgia Location within the United States
- Country: United States
- State: Georgia
- County: Lowndes
- Elevation: 1,483 ft (452 m)

Population (2020)
  - Total: 1,307
- Time zone: UTC−5 (Eastern (EST))
  - Summer (DST): UTC−4 (EDT)
- GNIS feature ID: 2403305

Moody Air Force Base is listed as a census-designated place (CDP) and is the official name for an area covering the residential population of the Moody Air Force Base, in Lowndes County, Georgia, United States.

Moody Air Force Base was first listed as an unincorporated place in the 1970 census and designated a CDP in the 1980 census. The population at the 2020 census was 1,307.

Residents are in the Lowndes County School District. Lowndes High School is the comprehensive high school of that district.

Historical population
Census	Pop.	Note	%±
1970	1,424		—
1980	1,297		−8.9%
1990	1,288		−0.7%
2000	993		−22.9%
2010	886		−10.8%
2020	1,307		47.5%
U.S. Decennial Census; 1960; 1970 1980 1990; 2000 2010 2020

=== 2020 census ===
Moody AFB CDP, Georgia – Racial and ethnic composition Note: the US Census treats Hispanic/Latino as an ethnic category. This table excludes Latinos from the racial categories and assigns them to a separate category. Hispanics/Latinos may be of any race.
Race / Ethnicity (NH = Non-Hispanic)	Pop 2000	Pop 2010	Pop 2020	% 2000	% 2010	% 2020
White alone (NH)	643	582	691	64.75%	65.69%	52.87%
Black or African American alone (NH)	230	133	262	23.16%	15.01%	20.05%
Native American or Alaska Native alone (NH)	1	3	11	0.10%	0.34%	0.84%
Asian alone (NH)	23	14	54	2.32%	1.58%	4.13%
Pacific Islander alone (NH)	4	0	19	0.40%	0.00%	1.45%
Some Other Race alone (NH)	4	8	6	0.40%	0.90%	0.46%
Mixed Race or Multi-Racial (NH)	13	45	70	1.31%	5.08%	5.36%
Hispanic or Latino (any race)	75	101	194	7.55%	11.40%	14.84%
Total	993	886	1,307	100.00%	100.00%	100.00%

== Education ==
On-post housing is assigned to the Lowndes County School District. The base is zoned to Pine Grove Elementary School and Pine Grove Middle School. All district residents are zoned to Lowndes High School.

Off-post families may be assigned to the Lowndes County district, Berrien County Schools, Lanier County Schools, or Valdosta City Schools depending on their residences.
