= 347th Rescue Group =

Search and rescue unit of the United States Air Force

347th Rescue Group

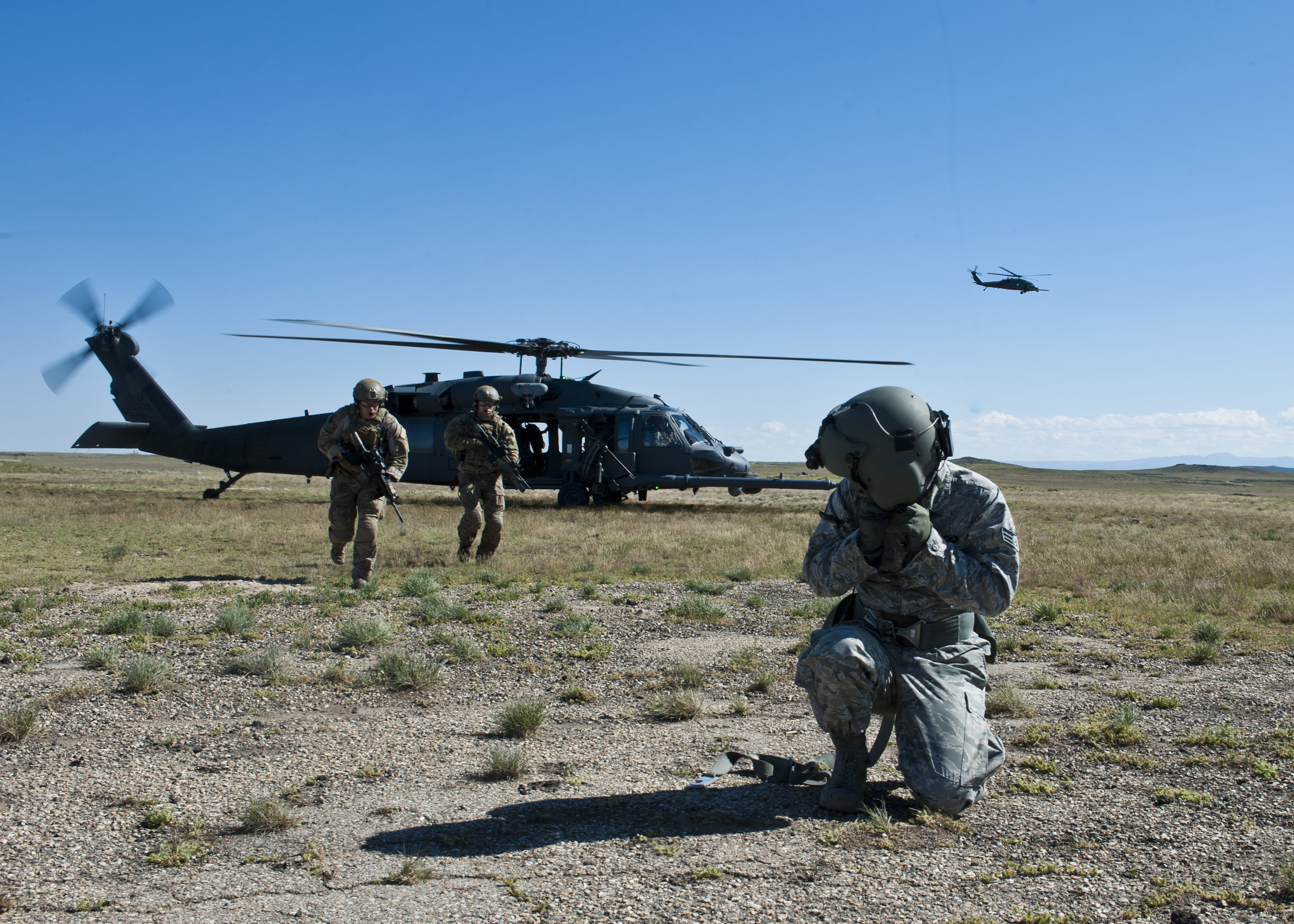
- Pararescuemen assigned to the group during training in 2014
- Active: 1942–1946; 1947–1950; 1991–present
- Country: United States
- Branch: United States Air Force
- Role: Combat Search and Rescue
- Part of: Air Combat Command: Fifteenth Air Force; 23rd Wing
- Garrison/HQ: Moody AFB, Georgia
- Engagements: World War II – Asiatic–Pacific Theater Kosovo War

- Decorations: Distinguished Unit Citation Presidential Unit Citation (Navy) Air Force Meritorious Unit Award Air Force Outstanding Unit Award Philippine Presidential Unit Citation

Commanders
- Current commander: Col Gary B. Symon
- Notable commanders: Victor E. Renuart Jr.

Insignia
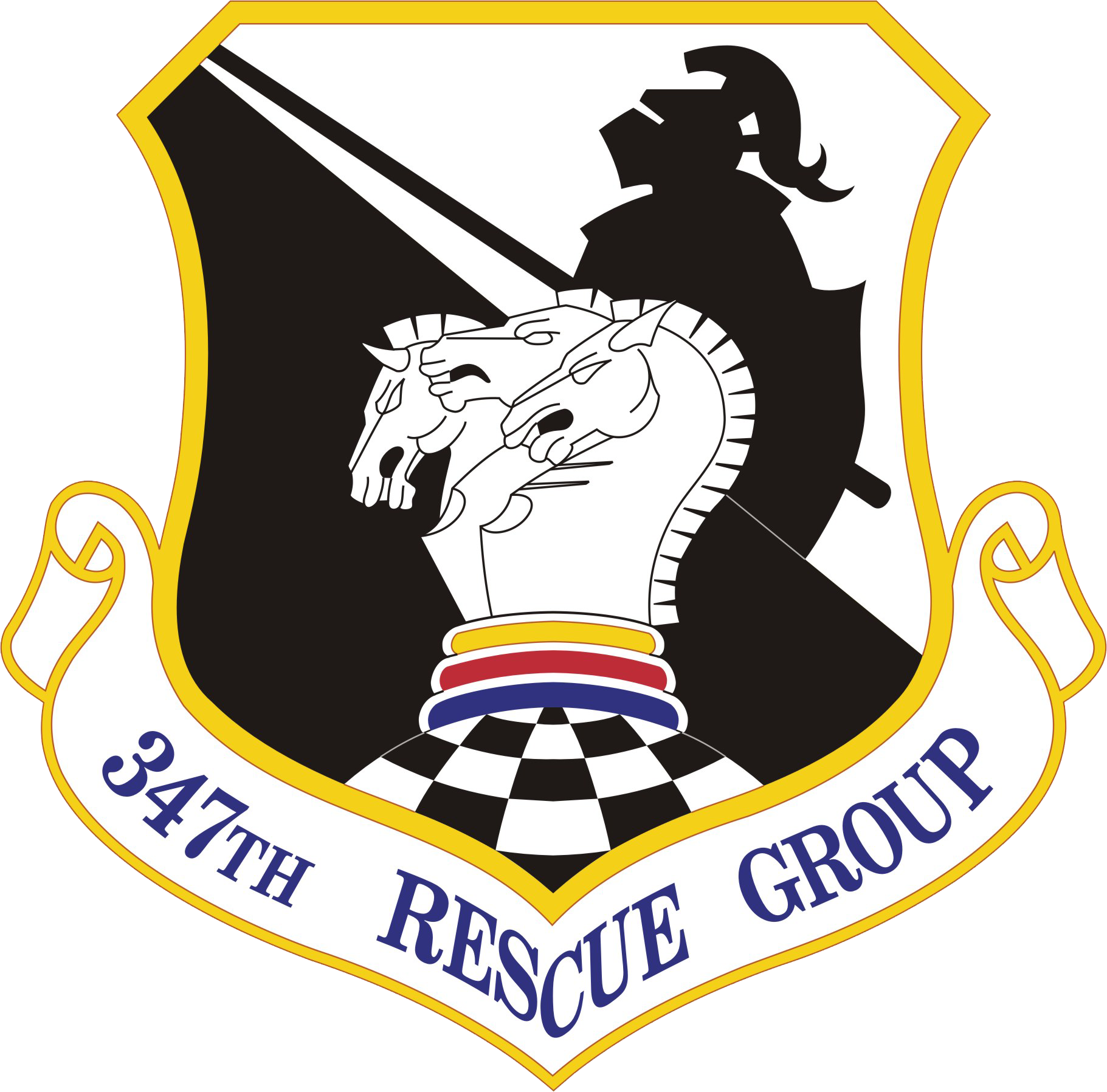
- 347th Rescue Group emblem (Note: Approved 7 December 2006.)

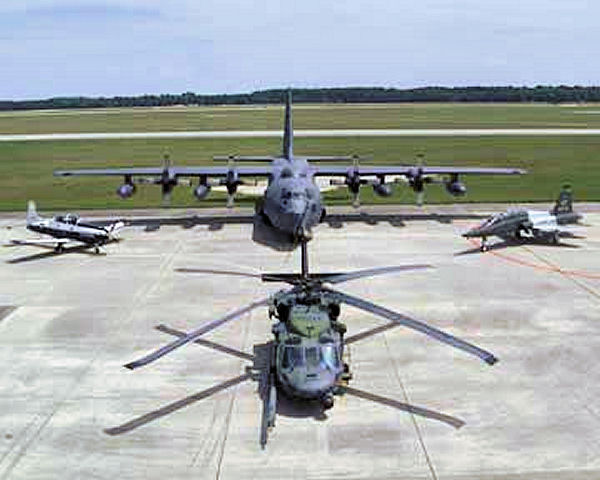
Aircraft of Moody AFB. Shown are the HC-130P (top), T-6 Texan II (left), T-38C (right), and HH-60G (bottom). The HC-130 and HH-60G are used by the 347th Rescue Group, the T-6 and T-38 by the 479th Flying Training Group

The United States Air Force's 347th Rescue Group (347 RQG) is an active combat search and rescue unit assigned to the 23rd Wing at Moody Air Force Base, Georgia.

== Mission ==
The 347th Rescue Group directs flying and maintenance of the one of two USAF active-duty groups dedicated to combat search and rescue. Responsible for training/readiness of 1,100 personnel, including a pararescue squadron, two flying squadrons (Lockheed HC-130J/HH-60W Jolly Green II), and an operations support squadron. Deploys worldwide in support of National Command Authority taskings.

== Units ==
- 38th Rescue Squadron: The 38th Rescue Squadron trains, equips, and employs combat-ready pararescue and supporting personnel worldwide in support of U.S. national security interests and NASA. This squadron provides survivor contact, treatment, and extraction during combat rescue operations, and uses various fixed/rotary wing insertion/extraction assets and employs by any means available to provide combat and humanitarian search, rescue, and medical assistance in all environments.
- 41st Rescue Squadron: The 41st Rescue Squadron maintains combat-ready status as an HH-60W Combat Search and Rescue (CSAR) and Personnel Recovery (PR) squadron. This squadron specializes in combat rescue of downed aircrews using night vision goggles (NVG), low-level formation, forward looking infrared cameras, aerial refueling, and survivor recovery. Members assigned to this squadron rapidly mobilize, deploy, and employ to provide combat and peacetime search and rescue in support of US national security interests and the NASA Space Shuttle. The 41st Rescue Squadron has all-weather, all-environment capabilities.
- 71st Rescue Squadron: The 71st Rescue Squadron maintains combat-ready status with 11 aircraft as one of two active duty HC-130J, combat search and rescue (CSAR) squadrons. This squadron rapidly mobilizes, deploys, and executes CSAR operations worldwide in support of national security interests. This mission requires the squadron to conduct low-level operations and air refueling using night vision goggles (NVGs) and airdrop pararescue personnel in support of combat personnel recovery.
- 347th Operations Support Squadron: The 347th Operations Support Squadron supports all warfighting operations associated with the Host Rescue Wing and ongoing deployments in support of U.S. National interests, while developing, mentoring, and training leaders and productive members to ensure spectacular Air Force success.

== History ==
=== World War II ===
Constituted as the 347th Fighter Group on 29 September 1942. Activated in New Caledonia on 3 October 1942. Detachments of the group, which was assigned to Thirteenth Air Force in January 1943, were sent to Guadalcanal, where they used Bell P-39 and P-400 Airacobra aircraft to fly protective patrols, support ground forces, and attack Japanese shipping.

Operational squadrons of the 347th FG were the 67th, 68th, 70th and 339th Fighter Squadrons.

When the Allied campaign to recover the central and northern Solomon Islands began in February 1943, the detachments, still operating from Guadalcanal and using Lockheed P-38 Lightnings and P-39 Airacobras, escorted bombers and attacked enemy bases on New Georgia, the Russell Islands, and Bougainville.

It was P-38Gs of the 339th Fighter Squadron which, on 18 April 1943, flew the mission which resulted in the death of Japanese Admiral Isoroku Yamamoto. Only their aircraft possessed the range to intercept and engage. Pilots were informed that they were intercepting an "important high officer," although they were not aware of who their actual target was.

On the morning of 18 April, despite urgings by local commanders to cancel the trip for fear of ambush, Yamamoto's planes left Rabaul as scheduled. Shortly after, eighteen specially fitted P-38s took off from Guadalcanal. They wave-hopped most of the 430 miles to the rendezvous point, maintaining radio silence throughout. At 09:34 Tokyo time, the two flights met and a dogfight ensued between the P-38s and the six Zeroes escorting Yamamoto.

1st Lt. Rex T. Barber engaged the first of the two Japanese bombers, which turned out to be Yamamoto's plane. He sprayed the plane with gunfire until it began to spew smoke from its left engine. Barber turned away to attack the other bomber as Yamamoto's plane crashed into the jungle. Afterwards, another pilot, Capt Thomas George Lanphier, Jr., claimed he had shot down the lead bomber, which led to a decades-old controversy until a team inspected the crash site to determine direction of the bullet impacts. Most historians now credit Barber with the claim.

One US pilot—1st Lt. Raymond K. Hine—was killed in action.

Headquarters moved up from New Caledonia at the end of 1943; and the following month the group moved from Guadalcanal to Stirling Island to support ground forces on Bougainville, assist in neutralizing enemy bases at Rabaul, and fly patrol and search missions in the northern Solomons.

The 347th was reassigned to New Guinea in August 1944, and equipped completely with P-38G's. Escorted bombers to oil refineries on Borneo; bombed and strafed airfields and installations on Ceram, Amboina, Boeroe, Celebes, and Halmahera. Received a Distinguished Unit Citation for a series of long-range bombing and strafing raids, conducted through intense flak and fighter defense, on the airfield and shipping at Makassar, Celebes, in November 1944.

Moved to the Philippines in February 1945. Supported landings on Mindanao in March 1945: bombed and strafed enemy installations and supported Australian forces on Borneo, attacked Japanese positions in northern Luzon, and flew escort missions to the Asiatic mainland.

The 347th Fighter Group was reassigned back to the United States in December 1945, and inactivated on 1 January 1946.

==== Korean War ====
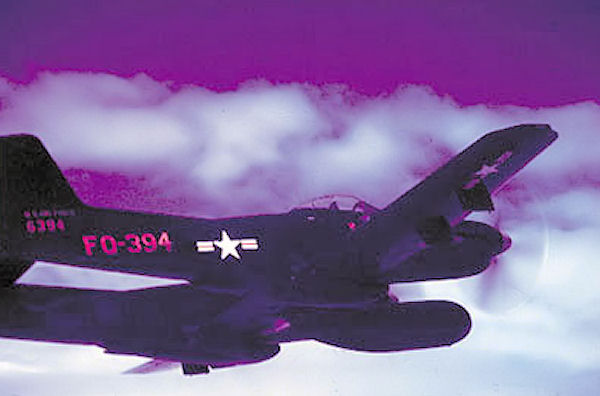
North American F-82G Twin Mustang Serial 46-394 of the 68th Fighter (All Weather) Squadron flying a night interceptor mission over the wartime skies of Korea, 1951.

As the war in Korea began, on 24 June 1950 the 347th Fighter Wing was inactivated and the 347th Fighter Group's Twin Mustang squadrons were transferred to South Korea. They were the only fighter aircraft available with the range to cover the entire Korean peninsula.

The 339th Squadron was attached to the 8th Fighter Wing at Kimpo Airfield, near Seoul South Korea to stem the North Korean advance. The 68th Fighter (AW) Squadron was based at Itazuke, Japan. The 4th (AW) Squadron was reassigned to the provisional 6302d Air Base Group and provided air defense of Japan and the Ryukyu Islands.

The 347th Fighter Group provided fighter cover for the C-54 and C-47 transports flying in and out of Kimpo Airfield. On 27 June 1950, an F-82G (46–383) of the 68th Fighter (AW) Squadron flown by Lieut. William (Skeeter) Hudson (pilot) and Lieut. Carl Fraser (radar operator) shot down a North Korean Yak-7U (possibly a misidentified Yak-11). This was the first air-to-air kill of the Korean War, and, incidentally, the first aerial victory by the newly formed United States Air Force.

It is believed that Lt. Hudson was flying an F-82G named "Bucket of Bolts" (46–601) instead of his usual aircraft on that historic day. Later that same day, an F-82G (46–392) flown by Major James Little of the 339th Fighter (AW) Squadron of the 347th Fighter Group shot down a North Korean Yak-9. Records are unreliable, and some experts maintain that Major Little actually was the first to kill.

The 339th and 68th Fighter (AW) Squadrons served in South Korea until December 1950, being attached to the 8th FBW, 35th FIW, and 51st FIW. As more jets, especially the all-weather Lockheed F-94 Starfire, became available the F-82s were relegated to ground attack missions before eventually being withdrawn from the Korean Theater, modified, and reassigned to bomber escort duties at Ladd AFB, Alaska. With their F-82's reassigned to Alaska, the 347th Fighter Group was inactivated and stood down.

== Lineage ==
- Established as the 347th Fighter Group on 29 September 1942

Activated on 3 October 1942
Inactivated on 1 January 1946

- Redesignated 347th Fighter Group (All Weather) on 19 December 1946

Activated on 20 February 1947
Redesignated 347th Fighter Group, All Weather on 10 August 1948
Redesignated 347th Fighter-All Weather Group on 20 January 1950
Inactivated on 24 June 1950

- Redesignated 347th Tactical Fighter Group on 31 July 1985 (Remained inactive)
- Redesignated 347th Operations Group on 1 May 1991

Activated on 1 May 1991
Redesignated 347th Rescue Group on 1 October 2006

=== Assignments ===
- Commander South Pacific, 3 October 1942
- I Island Air Command, 17 October 1942
- XIII Fighter Command, 13 January 1943 – 1 January 1946

Attached I Island Command, 1 July-c. December 1943

- Fifth Air Force, 20 February 1947
- 315th Composite Wing, 25 September 1947
- 347th Fighter Wing (later 347th Fighter-All Weather Wing), 18 August 1948 – 24 June 1950
- 347th Tactical Fighter Wing (later 347th Fighter Wing, 347th Wing, 347th Rescue Wing), 1 May 1991
- 23rd Wing, 1 October 2006 – present

=== Components ===
- 4th Fighter (later, Fighter-All Weather) Squadron: 20 February 1947 – 24 June 1950 (detached entire period)
- 38th Rescue Squadron: 1 May 2001–present
- 41st Rescue Squadron: 1 April 1997–present
- 52d Airlift Squadron: 1 May 1994 – 16 September 1997
- 67th Fighter Squadron: 3 October 1942 – 1 November 1945
- 68th Fighter (later, Fighter-All Weather; Tactical Fighter; Fighter) Squadron: 3 October 1942 – 1 November 1945; 20 February 1947 – 24 June 1950 (detached 1 March – 24 June 1950); 1 May 1991 – 30 April 2001
- 69th Tactical Fighter (later, Fighter) Squadron: 1 May 1991 – 2 February 2001
- 70th Fighter (later, Tactical Fighter; Fighter) Squadron: 3 October 1942 – 30 March 1943; 1 November – 26 December 1945; 1 May 1991 – 30 June 2000
- 71st Rescue Squadron: 1 April 1997–present
- 307th Fighter Squadron: 20 November 1992 – 31 August 1995
- 308th Fighter Squadron: 20 November 1992 – 1 April 1994
- 339th Fighter (later, Fighter-All Weather) Squadron: 3 October 1942 – 1 January 1946; 20 February 1947 – 24 June 1950 (detached 1 July 1949 – 24 June 1950)
- 431st Fighter Squadron: attached 15 November 1947 – 28 August 1948
- 433d Fighter Squadron: attached 18 November 1947 – 28 August 1948.

=== Stations ===
- Plaine Des Gaiacs Airfield, New Caledonia, Melanesia, 3 October 1942

Detachment operated from: Carney Airfield, Guadalcanal, Solomon Islands, 3 October – 22 December 1942 and 29 January–December 1943

- Carney Airfield, Guadalcanal, Solomon Islands, 29 December 1943
- Stirling Airfield, Stirling Island, Solomon Islands, 15 January 1944
- Sansapor (Mar) Airfield, Netherlands East Indies, 15 August 1944 (ground echelon only)
- Middleburg (Toem) Airfield, Netherlands East Indies, 20 August 1944 (air echelon only until 19 September)
- Wama Airfield, Morotai, Netherlands East Indies, c. 13 February 1945 (air echelon only)
- McGuire Field, San Jose, Mindoro, Philippines, 22 February 1945 (ground echelon only)
- Puerto Princesa Airfield, Palawan, Philippines, 6 March – 11 December 1945 (ground echelon only until 25 March)
- Camp Stoneman, California, 30 December 1945 – 1 January 1946
- Nagoya Airfield, Japan, 20 February 1947
- Itazuke Air Base, Japan, 25 September 1947
- Bofu Air Base, Japan, 25 September 1947
- Ashiya Airfield (later Ashiya Air Base, Japan, 25 September 1947
- Nagoya Airfield, Japan, 1 April – 24 June 1950
- Moody Air Force Base, Georgia, 1 May 1991 – present

=== Aircraft ===
- P-40 Warhawk, 1942–1943
- Bell P-39, P-400 Airacobra, 1942–1944
- Lockheed P-38 Lightning, 1942–1945
- P-51 (later, F-51) Mustang, 1947–1948
- Northrop P-61 Black Widow, 1947–1950
- North American F-82 Twin Mustang, 1949–1950
- General Dynamics F-16 Flying Falcon, 1991–2001
- Lockheed HC-130 (Various models), 1994–present
- A/OA-10 Thunderbolt II, 1995–2000
- Sikorsky HH-60G Pave Hawk, 1997–2021
- Sikorsky HH-60W Jolly Green II, 2020-present
