= 70th Fighter Squadron =

70th Fighter Squadron
- Active: 1941–1945; 1975–2000
- Country: United States
- Branch: United States Air Force
- Role: Fighter
- Nickname(s): White Knights
- Engagements: Southwest Pacific Theater
- Decorations: Distinguished Unit Citation; Air Force Outstanding Unit Award; Philippine Presidential Unit Citation

Insignia
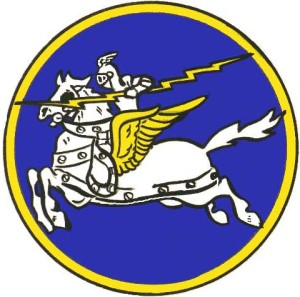
- 70th Fighter Squadron emblem (approved 17 May 1954

The 70th Fighter Squadron is an inactive United States Air Force squadron. The Squadron was constituted on 14 Dec 1940 as the 70th Pursuit Squadron (Interceptor). This squadron was activated on 1 Jan 1941 and patrolled the airspace around Fiji. After the war, the squadron was declared inactivated on 26 Dec 1945. The 70th Tactical Fighter Squadron was reinstated on 8 Sep 1975 and serve the 70th Fighter Squadron was retired on 1 Nov 1991. It was most recently part of the 347th Wing at Moody Air Force Base, Georgia. It operated Fairchild Republic A-10 Thunderbolt II aircraft conducting ground attack missions.

== History ==
=== World War II ===
The 70th provided air defense for Fiji from, February–December 1942. It then went on to fly combat missions in South and Southwest Pacific from, 21 December 1942 – 21 July 1944 and 9 September 1944 – 9 August 1945.

=== Tactical fighter operations ===
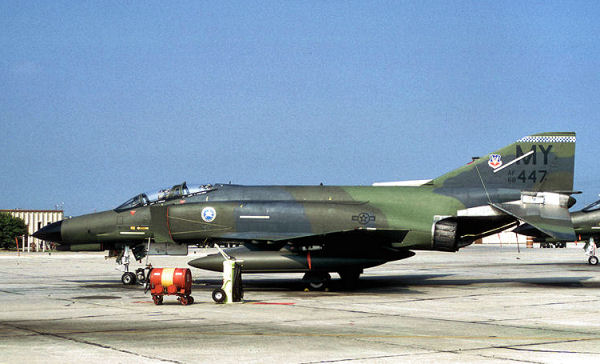
Squadron McDonnell F-4E Phantom in 1984 (Note: Aircraft is McDonnell F-4E-39-MC Phantom II serial 68-447.)

It deployed aircraft and personnel to Southwest Asia from, 10 January – 16 September 1992.

== Lineage ==
- Constituted as the 70th Pursuit Squadron (Interceptor) on 14 December 1940

Activated on 1 January 1941
Redesignated: 70th Fighter Squadron on 15 May 1942
Redesignated: 70th Fighter Squadron, Single Engine on 20 August 1943
Redesignated: 70th Fighter Squadron, Two Engine on 24 May 1944
Inactivated on 26 December 1945

- Redesignated 70th Tactical Fighter Squadron on 8 September 1975

Activated on 30 September 1975
Redesignated 70th Fighter Squadron on 1 November 1991
Inactivated on 30 June 2000

=== Assignments ===
- 35th Pursuit Group, 1 January 1941 – 15 January 1942
- US Army Forces in Fiji, 28 January 1942
- 347th Fighter Group, 3 October 1942
- 18th Fighter Group, 30 March 1943
- 347th Fighter Group, 1 November – 26 December 1945
- 347th Tactical Fighter Wing, 30 September 1975 (attached to 86th Tactical Fighter Wing 29 August – 28 September 1989)
- 347th Operations Group, 1 May 1991 – 30 June 2000

=== Stations ===
- Hamilton Field, California, 1 January 1941 – 12 January 1942
- Nadi Airfield, Viti Levu, Fiji Islands, 29 January 1942 (operated from Carney Airfield, Guadalcanal, Solomon Islands after 21 December 1942)
- Carney Airfield, Guadalcanal, Solomon Islands, 6 April 1943
- Munda Airfield, New Georgia, Solomon Islands, 18 October 1943
- Sansapor Airfield, Netherlands East Indies, 23 August 1944 (operated from Wama Airfield, Morotai, Netherlands East Indies, 9 November 1944 – 16 January 1945)
- Lingayen Airfield, Luzon, Philippines, 19 January 1945
- McGuire Field, Mindoro, Philippines, 26 February 1945
- San Roque Airfield Zamboanga, Philippines, 4 May 1945
- Puerto Princesa Airfield, Palawan, Philippines, 10 November – 26 December 1945
- Moody Air Force Base, Georgia, 30 September 1975 – 30 June 2000 (Deployed at Ramstein Air Base, Germany, 29 August – 28 September 1989)

=== Aircraft ===
- Curtiss P-36 Hawk (1941)
- Bell P-39 Airacobra (1942–1944)
- Curtiss P-40 Warhawk (1943)
- Lockheed P-38 Lightning (1943–1945)
- Douglas RA-24 Banshee (1944)
- McDonnell F-4 Phantom II (1975–1987)
- General Dynamics F-16 Fighting Falcon (1987–1995)
- Fairchild Republic A-10 Thunderbolt II (1995–2000)
