= 42nd Air Base Wing =

42nd Air Base Wing

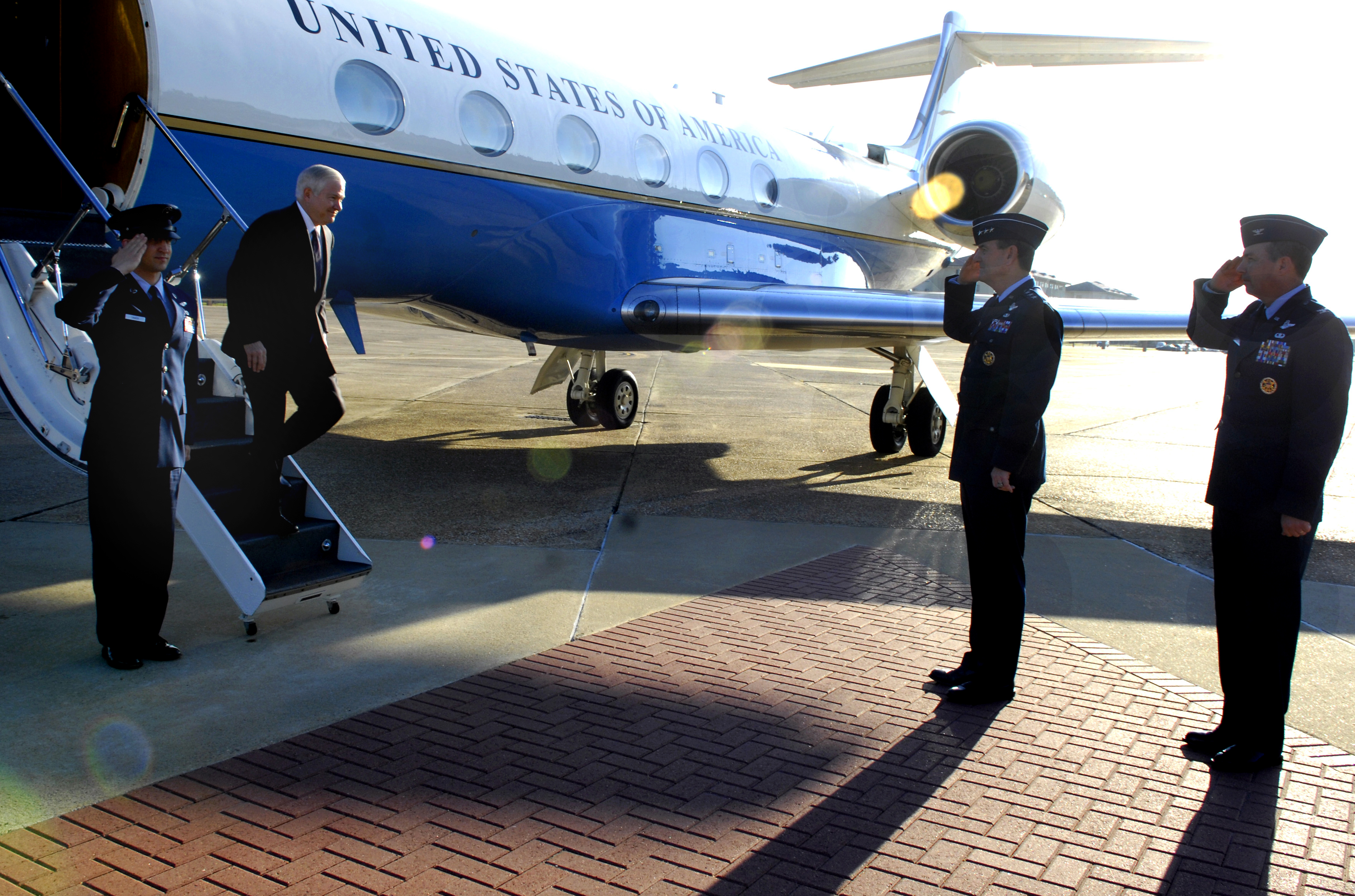
- Lt. Gen. Stephen Lorenz, Air University commander, and Col. Paul McGillicuddy, 42nd Air Base Wing commander greet Defense Secretary Robert M. Gates, at Maxwell Air Force Base in 2008
- Active: 1940–1946; 1953–1994; 1994–present
- Country: United States
- Branch: United States Air Force
- Role: Base support
- Part of: Air Education and Training Command
- Garrison/HQ: Maxwell Air Force Base
- Nickname: Crusaders (World War II)
- Motto: Aethera Nobis (Latin for 'The Skies for Us')
- Engagements: Southwest Pacific Theater, First Gulf War
- Decorations: Presidential Unit Citation Air Force Outstanding Unit Award French Croix de Guerre with Palm Philippine Presidential Unit Citation

Commanders
- Current commander: Colonel Mike Gallucci
- Vice Commander: Colonel Adam Rudolphi
- Command Chief: Chief Master Sergeant Demetrius N. Booth

Insignia
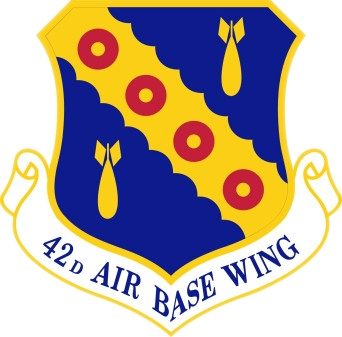
- 42nd Air Base Wing emblem (Note: Approved 16 April 1954. The emblem of the 42nd Bombardment Group was slightly modified on 19 March 1997. Warnock, AFHRA Factsheet, 42nd Air Base Wing.)

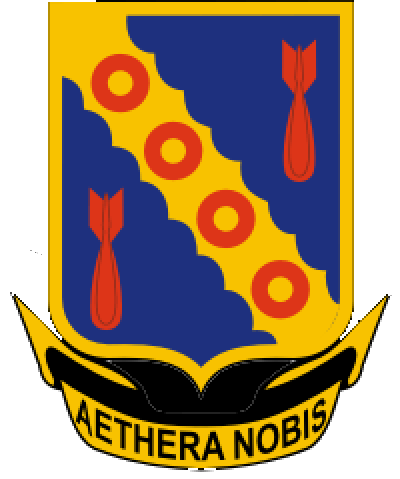
- 42nd Bombardment Group emblem (Note: Approved on 11 March 1942.)

The 42nd Air Base Wing is a United States Air Force unit assigned to Air University of Air Education and Training Command. It is stationed at Maxwell-Gunter Air Force Base, Alabama and is the host unit for Maxwell-Gunter. The wing's primary mission is to support all activities of Air University, the 908th Airlift Wing and other tenant units stationed at Maxwell-Gunter.

The wing was first activated shortly before the beginning of World War II as the 42nd Bombardment Group, a medium bomber unit. It conducted antisubmarine patrols off the Pacific coast following the Japanese attack on Pearl Harbor. The group provided units to reinforce the defenses of Alaska and to conduct patrols against German U-boats in the Caribbean Sea. It was brought up to strength by the transfer of veteran squadrons in 1943 when it moved to the Southwest Pacific Theater as part of Thirteenth Air Force. The 42nd saw combat in the Solomon Islands, Russell Islands, New Guinea and the Philippines. The group was awarded a Distinguished Unit Citation for its pre-invasion bombing of Balikpapan from 23 to 30 June 1945. Its missions during the campaign in the Philippines earned it a Philippine Presidential Unit Citation. The 42nd was inactivated in Japan in the spring of 1946 after serving as part of the occupation forces there.

The 42nd Bombardment Wing was initially activated in 1953 with Convair B-36 Peacemakers as a component of Strategic Air Command's heavy bomber force. After two years flying the Peacemaker, it became the second wing to fly the Boeing B-52 Stratofortress, and the first to convert to the B-52 from propeller-driven bombers. The wing maintained half of its planes on alert throughout the Cold War, and increased its alert commitment for the Lebanon crisis of 1958 and the Cuban Missile Crisis. The wing also provided aircraft and crews for the Vietnam War and First Gulf War. The wing was consolidated with the group into a single unit in 1985. The consolidated unit was inactivated when its home station, Loring Air Force Base, closed in 1994.

The wing was activated several months later as 42nd Air Base Wing, replacing the 502nd Air Base Wing as the host organization for Maxwell Air Force Base (now Maxwell-Gunter Air Force Base), Alabama. It has supported all Air Force units in the Montgomery, Alabama region since that time.

== Mission ==
The 42nd Air Base Wing is commanded by Col Shamekia N. Toliver. Its Vice Commander is Col Abigail Frander. Its Command Chief Master Sergeant is Chief Master Sergeant Caleb Vaden. The wing is the host unit for Maxwell-Gunter Air Force Base. It provides the foundation for Air University, the intellectual and leadership center of the Air Force; the 908th Airlift Wing; the Business and Enterprise Systems Directorate; and more than 30 tenant units.

The wing ensures airmen are ready to deploy in support of U.S. military operations worldwide and promotes their professional and personal growth. The wing is also responsible for the safety and security of the base, which it accomplishes through force protection, maintaining and modernizing facilities and infrastructure, and seeking efficient new ways of conducting operations. It supports more than 12,500 active duty, reserve, civilian and contractor personnel.

== Units ==
42nd Mission Support Group

The 42nd Mission Support Group consists of over 2,200 military and civilian employees organized into seven squadrons. The group provides contracting, security, civil engineering, operations/airfield support, personnel, communications, transportation, supply, fuels and services for 45,000 personnel. In addition, the group is responsible for maintaining a $2.2 billion physical plant including 4,106 acres, 859 buildings, 2,300 lodging rooms, utilities and communications. The group oversees a large support contract, which provides base operating support services through a multi-year contract.

== World War II ==
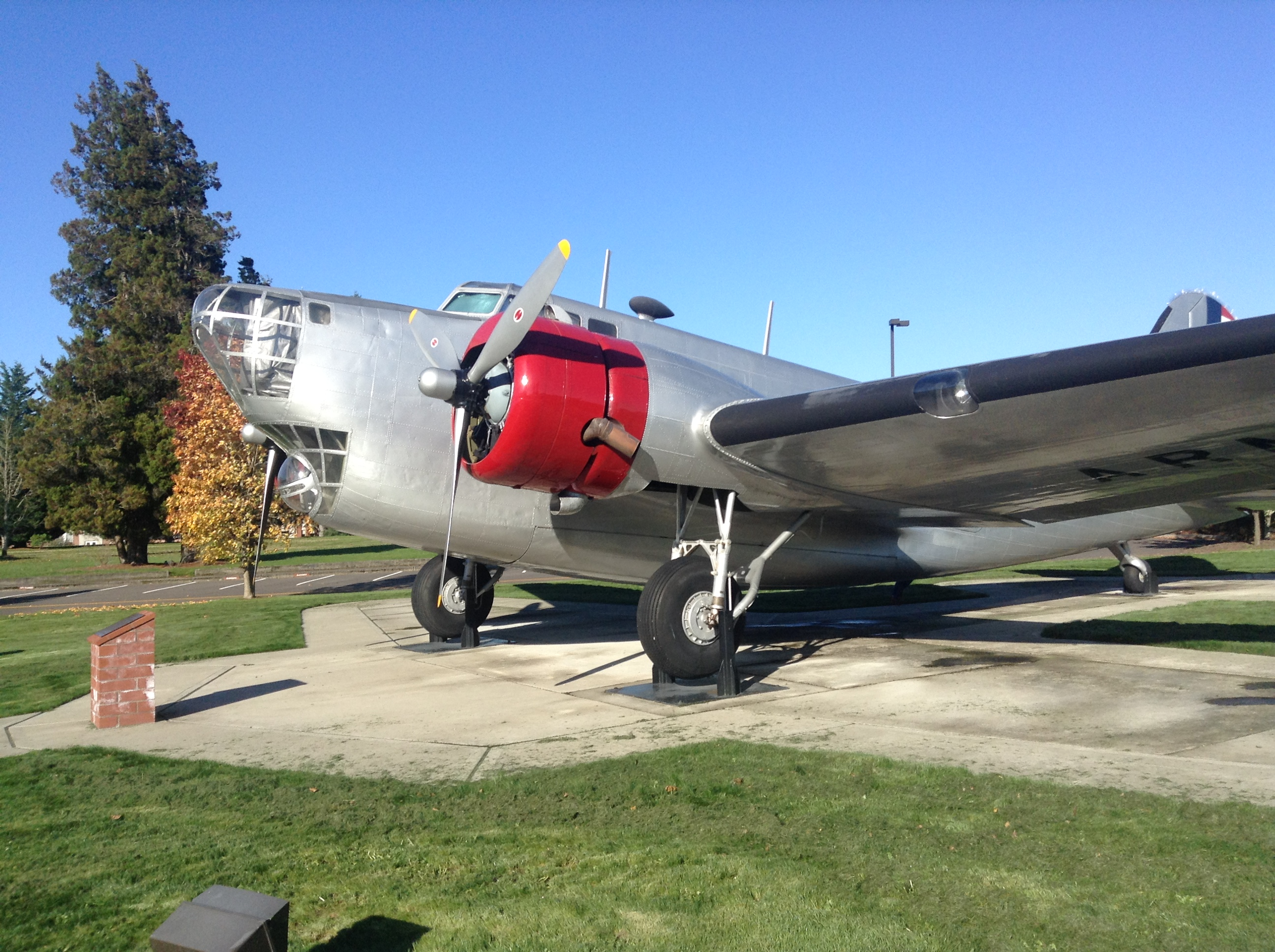
B-18 as assigned to the group for training

The 42nd Bombardment Group was first activated at Fort Douglas, Utah on 15 January 1941, drawing its cadre from the 7th Bombardment Group. Its original squadrons were the 75th, 76th and 77th Bombardment Squadrons and the 16th Reconnaissance Squadron, which was attached to the group. During its time at Fort Douglas, the group was without aircraft and spent its time in ground training and adding personnel to bring it up to strength. Shortages of equipment in the pre-war Army meant that even drill was performed with broomsticks taking the place of rifles.

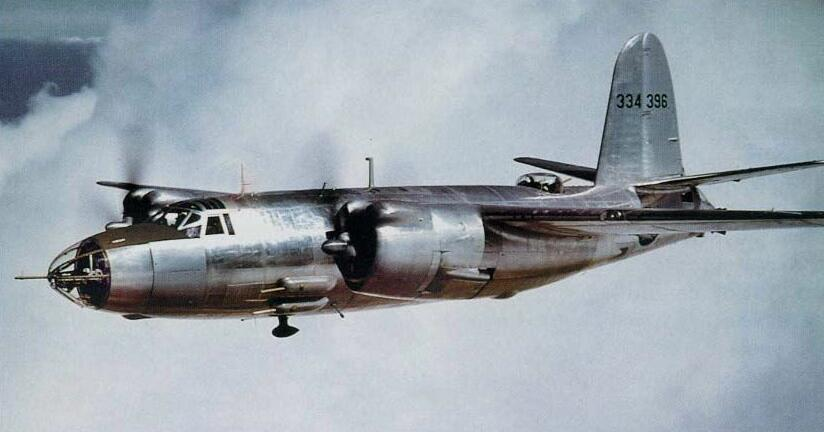
Martin B-26, first combat aircraft of the group.

In May the group began its move to Army Air Base, Boise (later named Gowen Field). Gowen was not ready for occupancy when the advance echelon arrived, so they were initially quartered at a National Guard armory near Boise, Idaho, named Camp Bonneville. By 4 June the group was assembled at Gowen Field. By August the group received its first six Douglas B-18 Bolos and was able to begin flying training. The group was notified in October that it would be equipped with the Martin B-26 Marauder. Several crews were sent to Patterson Field, Ohio, where they participated in the service testing of the Marauder. Once the testing was complete, the group began to pick up brand-new B-26s at the Martin plant.

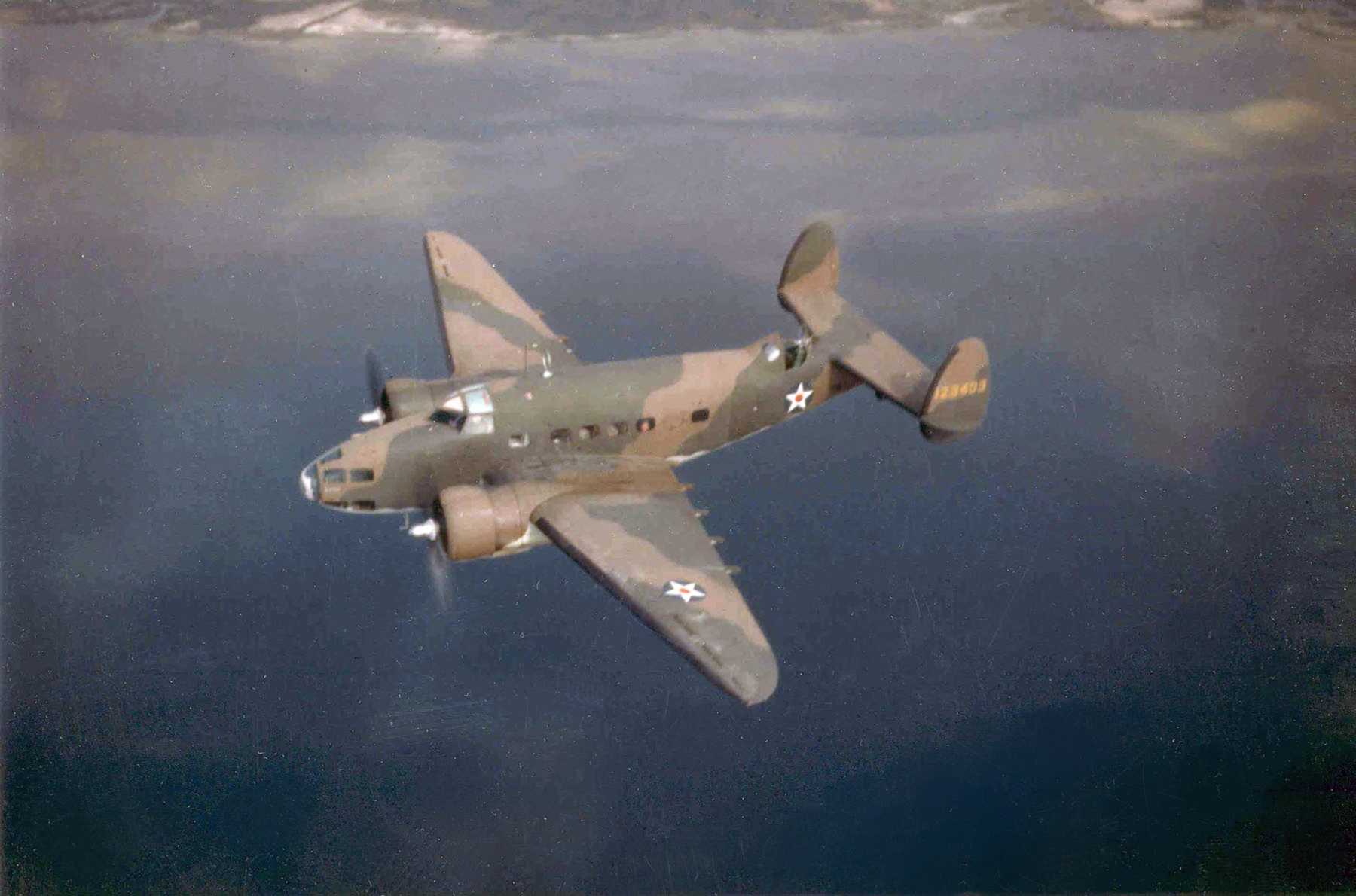
A-29 Hudson as used by the group on antisubmarine patrols

Following the Japanese attack on Pearl Harbor the group initially moved most of its available B-26s to Muroc Army Air Base, California. However, soon priority was given to bringing the 77th squadron up to full strength when it was alerted for immediate movement to Alaska. On 19 December the squadron departed for Elmendorf Field and by February it had been reassigned out of the group. At the beginning of the new year the remainder of the group dispersed to the Pacific Northwest, with group headquarters and the 76th Bombardment Squadron at McChord Field, Washington, the 75th at Portland Army Air Base, Oregon and the 16th Reconnaissance Squadron at Paine Field, Washington. To provide greater coverage for antisubmarine patrols, detachments were organized to fly out of smaller fields. The group primarily used Lockheed A-29 Hudsons for its antisubmarine work, but also flew several other types.

Meanwhile, a number of the senior officers of the group headquarters moved to Seattle, where they formed an advanced echelon for IV Bomber Command, which was taking over all Pacific coast antisubmarine operations, including those along the northern coast, which had been controlled by Second Air Force. In March, the place of the departed 77th was taken by the newly activated 390th Bombardment Squadron. Most of the initial personnel of the 390th were drawn from the group's headquarters squadron. At the same time, the 16th Reconnaissance Squadron was formally assigned to the group, changing its name to the 406th Bombardment Squadron. However, in May group strength was again reduced to three squadrons, when the air echelon of the 76th squadron departed for Miami, Florida and was attached to the 45th Bombardment Group as antisubmarine efforts focused on the German U-boat threat in the Caribbean Sea. The group shrank again the following month as the 406th's air echelon was dispatched to join the 77th in Alaska, where it was attached to the 28th Composite Group.

While antisubmarine patrols continued, the group trained North American B-25 Mitchell combat crews for the Alaskan Defense Command. The group's 390th squadron also tested incendiary bombs and bombing techniques at the ranges of Las Vegas Army Air Field. In February 1943 the group was alerted for overseas movement. Reorganizing for shipment overseas, the 76th and 406th squadrons, which had been on detached service since the previous spring were formally reassigned, while the 69th and 70th Bombardment Squadrons, which were already in the Southwest Pacific Theater with the 38th Bombardment Group, were transferred to the group. Crews from the group's 75th and 390th squadrons trained with B-25s at Hammer Field and McClellan Field in California before the air echelon departed for its new assignment on 6 March. One aircraft was lost en route to Hickam Field on the first leg of this shipment.

The group's ground echelon assembled at Camp Stoneman for overseas shipment aboard the SS Catalina and the USAT Maui, departing for Noumea on 27 and 28 March.

=== Combat in the Pacific ===
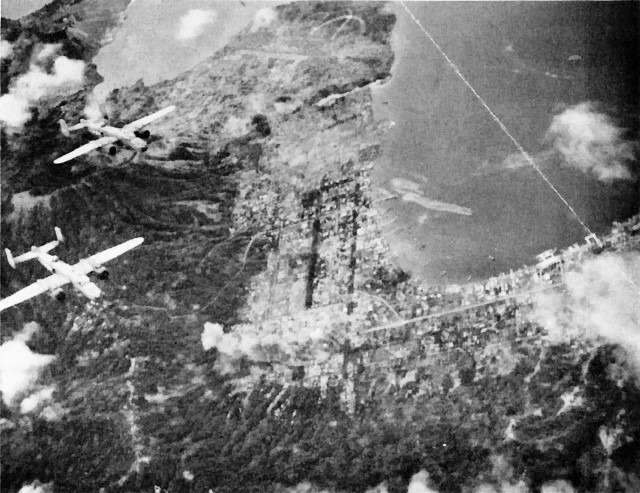
Rabaul under air attack by B-25s of ComAirSols

The air echelon arrived at Nandi Airfield in late April 1943, where it joined its 69th and 70th Bombardment Squadrons, which were already there. After additional training and the conversion of the 70th squadron to the B-25, the air echelon of the group headquarters and two squadrons moved to Carney Field, Guadalcanal in June and joined the ground echelon which had arrived the previous month. Although assigned to Thirteenth Air Force upon arrival, operational control of the group was vested in Commander, Air Solomons, or ComAirSols. The group launched its first attack on 14 June, when eighteen bombers of the 69th squadron with Navy Chance Vought F4U Corsairs flying top cover, struck the support areas of Vila Airfield, on Kolombangara.

The 42nd attacked Japanese airfields, personnel areas, gun positions, and shipping. Shipping attacks relied on what were referred to as "snooper" missions, armed reconnaissance sorties, flown at night, searching for Japanese shipping to attack. On 20 July, the group made a successful attack on Japanese combatant ships:

"[E]ight Mitchells of the 69th Squadron ... on all night shipping alert were dispatched to intercept the Tokyo Express making its way down the Slot . . . The force, sighted by [a Navy Consolidated PBY Catalina ] Black Cat patrol plane earlier in the evening, was estimated to consist of four destroyers, one light cruiser, and an unknown number of transports. . . [U]nder a bright tropical moon which adequately illuminated the target, [the B-25s] launched their attacks. Repeated skip-bombing attacks, with quarter-ton bombs driven into the face of a terrific barrage of automatic weapons fire from the warships, were observed by the Mitchell crews and the naval crews aboard the patrol plane to have accomplished the following results: Enemy losses-one light cruiser left burning and dead in the water; two direct hits scored on a destroyer, causing large explosions and certain destruction; damaging hits or near misses on a 300-foot freighter. Our losses: one Mitchell shot down by antiaircraft." At 0720 eight Mitchells of the 390th Squadron found the cruiser damaged in the previous night's action creeping to friendly waters at a speed of 2 knots. Although sorely wounded, her defense was still vicious, pouring anti-aircraft fire from at least 30 stations. Feints at various quarters divided the fire and allowed individual planes to launch masthead attacks. Lieut. Schauffler ended the fray when one of his bombs exploded in the ship's magazine. Two minutes later she slipped into the depths, carrying with her at least 75% of her crew."

During most of this period, the group could maintain only two squadrons in the Solomons at a time, and at the end of July 1943, the 70th and 75th squadrons moved forward, while the 69th and 390th moved to rear areas to refit. In October, Munda was taken from the Japanese and the Crusaders could now stage through that base, extending their range and the number of targets they could attack. On 6 October, the group made an attack against the Japanese field at Kahili. Because of the critical need to avoid detection, this involved flying over 300 miles at minimum altitude over a route designed to avoid islands along the way from which the group's Mitchells could be spotted. The successful strafing and parafrag (Note: Fragmentation bombs delivered at low altitude and retarded by parachutes to permit the aircraft to escape the zone of danger before exploding.) attack shut down all enemy air forces in the area for the next two days, enabling the Navy to withdraw two crippled destroyers and continue rescue operations and permitting cargo ships to offload troops and supplies at Barakoma airfield without air opposition. The group moved forward to the Russell Islands in October, locating at Renard Field. Russell Islands. Shortly thereafter, the 75th squadron moved to Renard as well.

In December 1943, a shipment of 440 enlisted men and ten officers arrived from advanced B-25 training, mostly at Greenville Army Air Base, South Carolina. These replacements permitted most of the ground echelon of the 69th and 70th squadrons, which had been engaged in combat since before the group arrived in the theater, to rotate back to the United States. At the beginning of 1944, the group added a fifth squadron, the 106th Reconnaissance Squadron (soon renamed the 100th Bombardment Squadron). It began using the new airfield on Stirling Island as a staging point for strikes in early January and relocated there before the end of the month. Until July 1944, the group engaged primarily in the neutralization of enemy airfields and harbor facilities on New Britain, but also supported ground forces on Bougainville Island and attacked shipping in the northern Solomons and the Bismarck Archipelago.

=== New Guinea ===
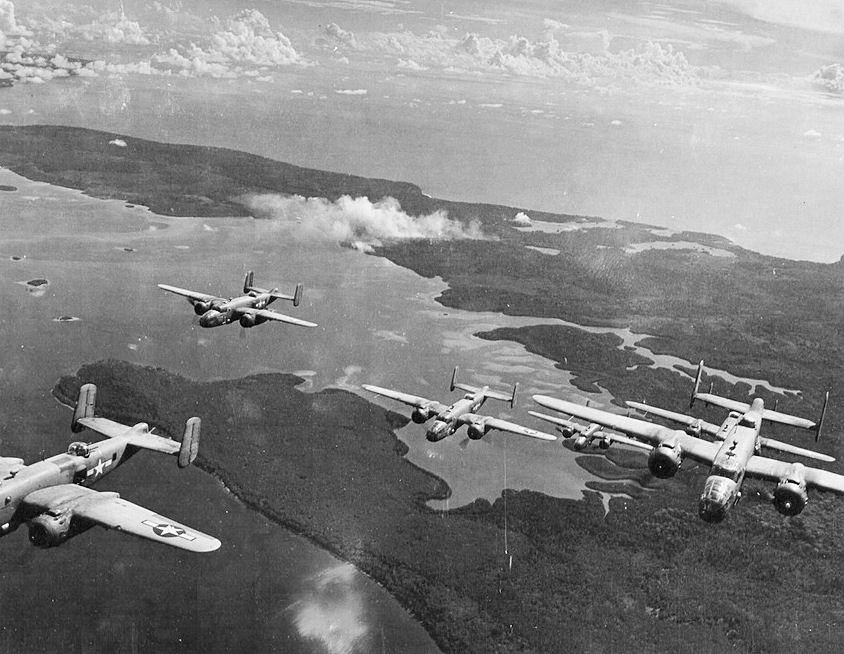
B-25 Mitchells from the 42nd Bombardment Group over Bougainville, 1944

In July 1944, the group air echelon began moving to New Guinea and the Cyclops Airstrip and Sentani Airstrip near Hollandia. It was early September before the entire air echelon of the group arrived, with the latecomers practicing skip bombing and participating in mock invasion exercises in the Russell Islands and Admiralty Islands. Through January 1945, it bombed airfields and installations on New Guinea, Celebes, and Halmahera, and flew reconnaissance missions. The group also detached Mitchells to act as navigation ships for Douglas A-20 Havocs of the 312th Bombardment Group attacking targets in southwestern New Guinea. The A-20s were not equipped with bombsights and could only make medium altitude attacks by "dropping on leader" (flying in formation and releasing their bombload at the same time as the lead aircraft, equipped with a bombsight). Group aircraft also dropped food and supplies to isolated parties in the interior of the island. Little more than a week after the last elements of the air echelon arrived in the Hollandia area, the group air echelon departed for the Mar Airstrip near Sansapor, linking up with its ground echelon, which had been there since late August, having arrived by ship from the Russell Islands. However, Mar was not ready for the group's planes and it operated from Middleburg Island for a few days until the pierced steel planking runway at Mar was ready. From its arrival at Sansapor until after the end of the war, the group was attached to a series of headquarters which acted as task force headquarters for Far East Air Forces to accomplish different operations.

=== Philippines ===
The group moved to the Philippines in February and March 1945. By the time it had settled in at Puerto Princesa Airfield, its original flying cadre from the Solomons campaign had rotated back to the United States after flying the required number of missions. However, few of the ground crews were returned to the States, although many had expected to be relieved when rotation policies were announced, only to be cancelled. From this base on Palawan the group attacked shipping along the China coast, struck targets in French Indochina, bombed airfields and installations in the Philippines, and supported ground operations on Mindanao. Ground support including air delivering DDT over the landing beaches to suppress disease-bearing insects. Its missions during the campaign in the Philippines earned it a Philippine Presidential Unit Citation.

The 42nd was awarded a Distinguished Unit Citation for its pre-invasion bombing of Balikpapan between 23 and 30 June 1945. Balikpapan was a center for oil refining on Borneo held by the Japanese. These attacks included bombing and strafing enemy shore installations. The round trip to the target was over 1700 miles and was among the longest flown by medium bombers during the war. Pre-mission experiments determined that the group's bombers could carry a bomb load over this distance with fuel tanks installed in their radio compartments despite having to take off from a runway damaged by enemy action. Four of the missions encountered severe tropical weather fronts. Despite intense and accurate flak, the group destroyed gun positions, warehouses, roadblocks, fuel and ammunition dumps, a radar station as well as huge stores of gasoline and oil which the enemy had placed in position to be released into shallow pits on the beach and ignited when the Australian ground troops made their assaults. The group attacked the beach while naval underwater demolition teams operated offshore without losing a man. The attacks were so effective that the Australian Seventh Division was able to come ashore without enemy opposition. The group continued to support Australian forces in Borneo after this mission, augmented by the B-25s of the 38th Bombardment Group of Fifth Air Force.

The group's final combat action of World War II was attacking isolated Japanese units on Luzon during July and August 1945. In August the group was alerted for a move to Okinawa. However, with the end of the war, the move was cancelled. During the war the group had flown 1461 missions (a total of 14,442 sorties). The group ferried troops and equipment to Manila after the surrender of Japan. At the end of 1945, the 100th squadron returned to the United States for inactivation and the 390th was inactivated in the Philippines. The remainder of the group moved to Itami Air Base, Japan as part of the occupation forces at the start of 1946. At Itami, the unit began preparations to convert to Douglas A-26 Invaders, but it was inactivated there on 10 May 1946.

== Cold War ==
The 42nd Bombardment Wing was first activated on 25 February 1953 at Limestone Air Force Base, Maine and was assigned to Eighth Air Force as part of Strategic Air Command (SAC). Limestone was a new installation and the wing was organized with the help of resources and temporary duty personnel on loan from the 7th Bombardment Wing at Carswell Air Force Base, Texas and of the 4215th Air Base Squadron, which had overseen the construction of Loring as a heavy bomber base since 1950. The wing was assigned the 69th, 70th, and 75th Bombardment Squadrons, which had been assigned to the 42nd Bombardment Group at the end of World War II, although initially only the 69th could be manned.

The 69th began training with the Convair B-36 Peacemaker aircraft in April, followed by the 70th, which received manning in May and commenced flying in July. By 13 August all three operational squadrons were flying the Peacemaker. The wing was declared combat ready on 7 January 1954. Once combat ready, elements of the wing deployed to RAF Upper Heyford and RAF Burtonwood in England. The entire wing deployed to Upper Heyford from 18 October to 18 November 1955.

The 42nd continued to grow in manpower during the next few years. In January 1955, the 42nd Air Refueling Squadron was activated and assigned to the wing. This assignment was unusual, since the wing's B-36s were incapable of air refueling. However, the forward location of Loring made it an ideal for the squadron's slow propeller-driven Boeing KC-97G Stratotankers to rendezvous with faster Boeing B-47 Stratojets crossing the Atlantic. On 14 August 1954, the last B-36J accepted by SAC was delivered to the wing. The wing's experience with the B-36 was short, however, as it became the first wing to convert from the B-36 to the Boeing B-52 Stratofortress. (Note: The wing was the second, however to fly B-52s. The 93rd Bombardment Wing had converted to B-52s from Boeing B-47 Stratojets. Knaack, p. 237.)

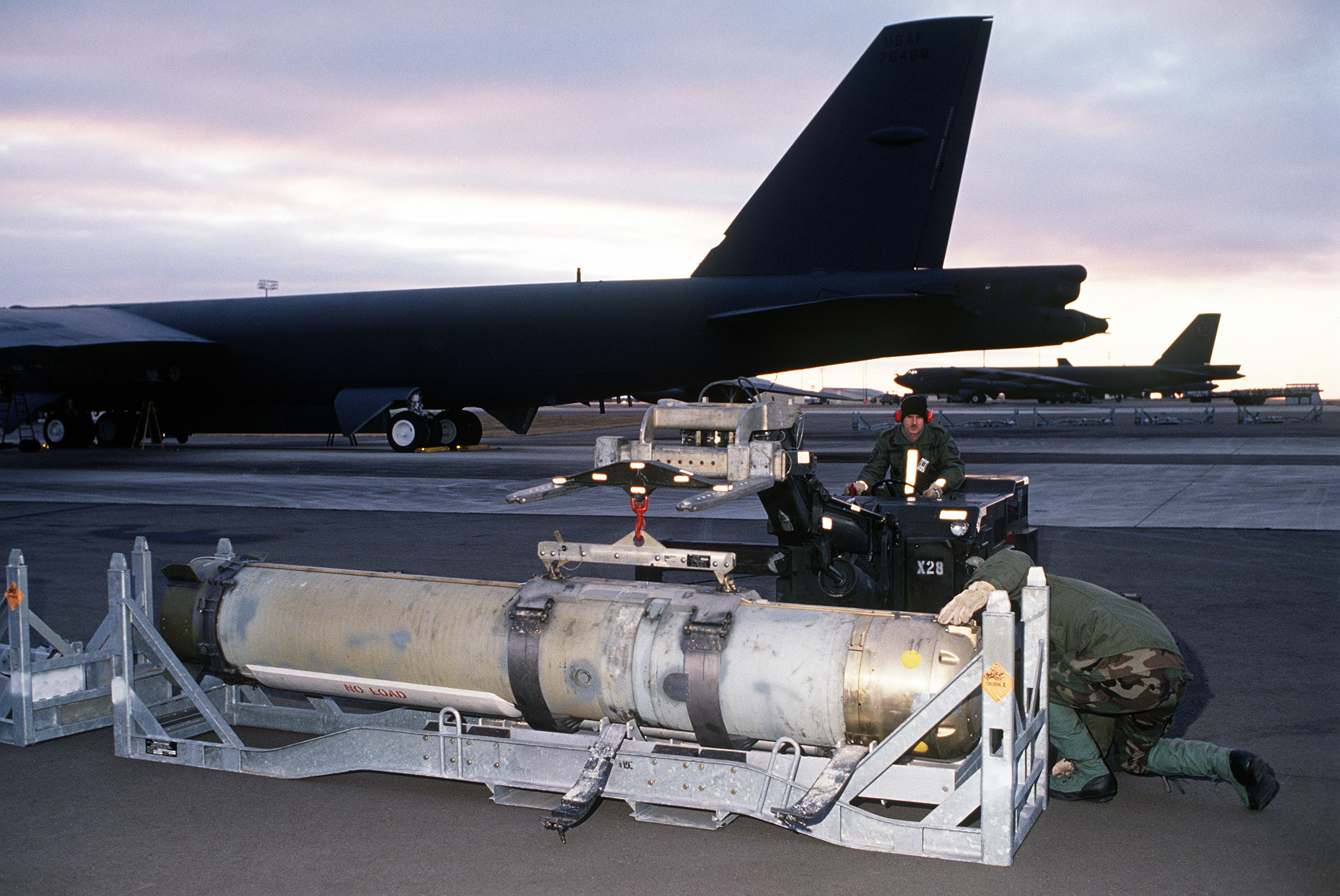
42nd Bombardment Wing B-52s and a Mark 60 antisubmarine mine

Although a B-52 had arrived at Loring in January 1956 for cold weather testing, the first B-52C assigned to the wing landed at Loring on 16 June 1956 and was christened "The State of Maine" with a bottle containing water from both the Atlantic and Pacific oceans as a symbol of the aircraft's range. The last C model had been accepted by December. All 35 B-52Cs in the Air Force inventory were initially delivered to the 42nd. By the end of the year, the wing replaced the older B-36s and was combat ready with the Stratofortresses. On 24 and 25 November 1956, in an operation known as Quick Kick, four B-52Cs of the 42nd joined four B-52Bs of the 93rd Bombardment Wing for a nonstop flight around the perimeter of North America. Four in-flight refuelings by Boeing KC-97 Stratofreighters were required for the 13,500-nautical-mile (25,000 km) journey.

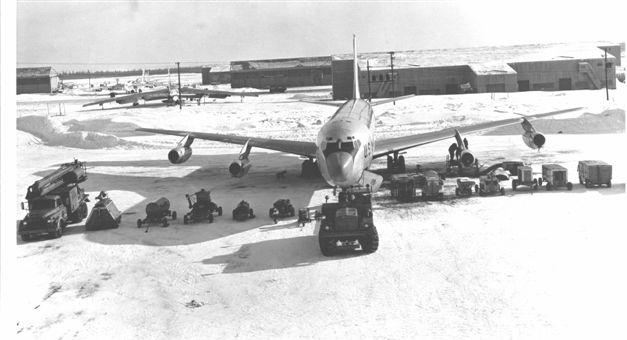
KC-135A at Loring AFB

In the fall, the wing began to receive B-52Ds to replace its C series aircraft. However, crew training lagged behind the delivery of new bombers and at the end of the year the wing had only sixteen combat ready crews. When Boeing KC-135A Stratotankers were assigned to the 42nd Air Refueling Squadron in 1957, the wing became an all-jet force. The first Stratotanker, which arrived on 16 October, was dubbed the "Aroostook Queen." In July 1958, wing aircrews were placed on alert because of the 1958 Lebanon crisis. Although tensions subsided and the wing returned to its previous alert status, it upgraded its capabilities as B-52Gs replaced the wing's older B-52Ds, bringing with them increased range and payload capabilities, in May 1959. Shortly after this upgrade, the wing moved its bombers to another B-52G base, Ramey Air Force Base, Puerto Rico from July through October 1959 while major repairs were made to Loring's runway. Its tankers flew from Goose Air Base, Labrador during this period.

In the late 1950s SAC began a program to disperse its Boeing B-52 Stratofortress bombers over a larger number of bases, thus making it more difficult for the Soviet Union to knock out the entire fleet with a surprise first strike. SAC bases with large concentrations of bombers made attractive targets. SAC's response was to break up its wings and scatter their aircraft. The wing's 75th Bombardment Squadron moved to Griffiss Air Force Base, New York, where it was assigned to the 4039th Strategic Wing in October 1959.

Starting in 1960, one third of the wing's aircraft were maintained on fifteen-minute alert, fully fueled, armed and ready for combat to reduce vulnerability to a Soviet missile strike. This was increased to half the wing's aircraft in 1962. The strike capability of the wing increased starting in December 1960, when AGM-28 Hound Dog and ADM-20 Quail missiles were added to the wing inventory.

In January 1962, the wing began to participate in Operation Chrome Dome. In Chrome Dome, the 42nd flew fully combat-configured bombers along routes across the Atlantic to the Mediterranean. In Operation Hard Head VI, the wing flew similar missions to monitor communications with the Thule, Greenland Ballistic Missile Early Warning System site. Tasking to support these two operations typically lasted from thirty to sixty days during which the wing maintained two B-52s airborne at all times. The wing's 42nd Air Refueling Squadron provided air refueling for aircraft flying Chrome Dome missions.

Cold War tensions between the United States and Russia came to a head in October 1962. President John F. Kennedy informed the American public that the Soviet Union had installed missile sites in Cuba from which it could strike the United States. As a result, SAC canceled flying training and increased the size of its ground and airborne alert forces. The wing launched four B-52s on Chrome Dome and Hard Head VI missions, established the Loring Tanker Task Force, and aircraft not supporting airborne alert were put on ground alert. During the Cuban Missile Crisis, wing bombers flew 132 airborne alert missions and its tankers flew 214 air refueling missions, transferring almost 24 million pounds of fuel to the B-52s.

In February 1965, wing involvement in the Vietnam War began as the 42nd Air Refueling Squadron sent aircraft to the Young Tiger Task Force, which supported tactical operations in Southeast Asia. The wing was reduced to a single bombardment squadron when the 70th was inactivated in June 1966. However, in July 1968 the wing returned to a strength of three tactical squadrons when the 407th Air Refueling Squadron moved to Loring from Homestead Air Force Base, Florida as Tactical Air Command took over Homestead from SAC. The 407th joined the 42nd to support Young Tiger Task Force missions. In the same period, the wing deployed aircraft, aircrews, and support personnel periodically in support of Operation Arc Light and other operations in Southeast Asia. The 42nd maintained dispersed tankers on alert at McGuire Air Force Base, in its Detachment 1 from 1 January 1970 through early 1975.

In 1972 the demand for the wing's aircraft and personnel to deploy for Operations Bullet Shot, Young Tiger, and Linebacker II increased significantly. In December 1972 the wing suffered its only loss of the war when a B-52 crewed by members of the wing was hit by a surface-to-air missile over North Vietnam. The crew members flew the damaged "Buff" over Thailand before they bailed out. All were recovered within a short period. Wing personnel and equipment remained active in Southeast Asia operations until late 1973. 1972 also saw the wing become the first to be equipped with AGM-69 SRAM (Short Range Attack Missiles) for the nuclear strike mission.

Following the Vietnam War, the wing again participated in military exercises worldwide and provided tankers to support USAF air refueling needs. In 1977 the wing won the Omaha Trophy as the outstanding wing in SAC.

1983 saw the wing become the first to be equipped with Boeing AGM-84 Harpoon missiles for anti-shipping operations. The 69th Bombardment Squadron in particular was assigned the minelaying, sea surveillance and anti-shipping mission. On 31 January 1984, the Air Force combined the 42nd Bombardment Wing with the old 42nd Bombardment Group. The newly consolidated organization retained the 42nd Bombardment Wing designation.

=== From 1990 ===
On 7 August 1990, the wing began to deploy aircraft, personnel and equipment to Diego Garcia for Operation Desert Shield. Wing B-52 aircrews flew 485 combat missions and dropped over 6,000 tons of bombs on the enemy during Desert Storm. Tankers from the 42nd also deployed to Diego Garcia. By March 911, the wing began returning personnel and equipment to Loring and all had returned by 12 April 1991.

On 1 October 1990, the 407th Air Refueling Squadron was inactivated and seven of its aircraft transferred to Griffiss Air Force Base. Two days later, President George H. W. Bush ordered alert crews to stand down. SAC removed its remaining forces from alert in December. One year later, after a decision by the Base Realignment and Closure Commission, the wing began preparations to close Loring.

On 1 September 1991, the wing was redesignated as the 42nd Wing to recognize that it flew not only bombers, but tankers. The renamed wing won the Crumm/Linebacker Trophy for high altitude bombing in the last SAC sponsored bombing competition. Then, on 1 June 1992, Headquarters. United States Air Force inactivated SAC and transferred the wing to the newly activated Air Combat Command as the 42nd Bomb Wing when its tankers became part of the 380th Air Refueling Wing of Air Mobility Command. The last B-52G assigned to the 42nd departed the base for the Aerospace Maintenance and Regeneration Center at Davis-Monthan Air Force Base, Arizona on 16 November 1993. Loring closed on 30 September 1994, and the wing was inactivated.

On 1 October 1994 the unit was activated and redesignated as the 42nd Air Base Wing and took over as the host unit at Maxwell Air Force Base, Alabama, assuming the personnel, equipment, and mission of the 502nd Air Base Wing. (Note: This activation was part of a service-wide effort to preserve the lineage of the Air Force’s most honored wings. The 502nd was a post-World War II wing with no combat honors.) The wing has served as the host for Maxwell (now Maxwell-Gunter) since then. In August 2005, after hurricane Katrina devastated New Orleans, the wing managed Maxwell-Gunter as an evacuation center for over 1,000 evacuees from the Gulf Coast and as a Federal Emergency Management Agency staging area for relief convoys to affected areas.

== Lineage ==
Lineage, including assignments, components, stations, aircraft, awards and campaigns in Warnock, Factsheet, 42 Air Base Wing, except as noted

42nd Bombardment Group

- Constituted as the 42nd Bombardment Group (Medium) on 20 November 1940

Activated on 15 January 1941
Redesignated 42nd Bombardment Group, Medium on 6 September 1944
Inactivated on 10 May 1946
Consolidated with the 42nd Bombardment Wing as the 42nd Bombardment Wing on 31 January 1984

42nd Air Base Wing

- Constituted as the 42nd Bombardment Wing, Heavy on 19 February 1953

Activated on 25 February 1953
Consolidated with the 42nd Bombardment Group on 31 January 1984
Redesignated 42nd Wing on 1 September 1991
Redesignated 42nd Bomb Wing on 1 June 1992
Inactivated on 30 September 1994

- Redesignated 42nd Air Base Wing and activated on 1 October 1994

=== Assignments ===
- Northwest Air District (later Second Air Force), 16 January 1941 (attached to 20th Bombardment Wing, 16 January – 1 September 1941)
- 2nd Bomber Command (later II Bomber Command), 5 September 1941
- IV Bomber Command, 25 January 1942
- XIII Bomber Command, 14 March 1943 (attached to 308th Bombardment Wing, c. 24 August 1944; 310th Bombardment Wing, 3 September 1944; Thirteenth Air Task Force, c. 15 September 1944; XIII Fighter Command, 1 October 1944; XIII Bomber Command Rear Echelon, 9 January 1945; XIII Fighter Command, c. 22 March – c. September 1945)
- Fifth Air Force, 25 December 1945
- 310th Bombardment Wing, 31 January 1946
- V Fighter Command, 25 March – 10 May 1946
- Eighth Air Force, 25 February 1953
- 45th Air Division, 8 October 1954 (attached to 7th Air Division, 18 October – 18 November 1955)
- Eighth Air Force, 18 January 1958
- 45th Air Division, 1 December 1958
- Eighth Air Force, 29 March 1989
- Ninth Air Force, 1 June 1992 – 30 September 1994
- Air University, 1 October 1994 – present

=== Components ===
Groups

- 42nd Air Base Group (later 42nd Combat Support Group, 42nd Support Group, 42nd Mission Support Group): 25 February 1953 – 8 October 1954, 1 January 1958 – 30 June 1994, 1 October 1994 – present
- 42nd Logistics Group: 1 September 1991 – 30 June 1994, 1 October 1994 – 30 September 2002
- 42nd Medical Group (later 42nd Tactical Hospital): 25 February 1953 – 1 July 1959
- 42nd Operations Group: 1 September 1991 – 31 January 1994
- 811th Medical Group (later USAF Hospital, Loring; 42nd Strategic Hospital; 42nd Medical Group): 1 July 1959 – 30 June 1994, 1 October 1994 – present

Operational Squadrons

- 16th Reconnaissance Squadron (later 406th Bombardment Squadron): attached 15 January 1941 – 2 March 1942, assigned 3 March 1942 – 25 February 1943 (air echelon attached to 28th Composite Group after 3 June 1942, ground echelon attached after 10 November 1942)
- 42nd Air Refueling Squadron: 18 January 1955 – 1 September 1991
- 69th Bombardment Squadron: 26 February 1943 – 10 May 1946 (detached 26 February – c. 15 April 1943); 25 February 1953 – 1 September 1991
- 70th Bombardment Squadron: 26 February 1943 – 10 May 1946 (detached 26 February – c. 15 April 1943); 25 February 1953 – 25 June 1966
- 75th Bombardment Squadron: 15 January 1941 – 10 May 1946; 25 February 1953 – 15 October 1959
- 76th Bombardment Squadron: 15 January 1941 – 12 February 1943 (air echelon attached to 45th Bombardment Group c. 21 May 1942, AAF Antisubmarine Command 13 October 1942, 26th Antisubmarine Wing after 20 November 1942)
- 77th Bombardment Squadron: 15 January 1941 – 2 February 1942
- 106th Reconnaissance Squadron (later, 100th Bombardment Squadron): attached c. 6 January 1944, assigned 1 February 1944 – 11 December 1945
- 390th Bombardment Squadron: 20 March 1942 – 27 January 1946
- 407th Air Refueling Squadron: 2 July 1968 – 1 October 1990

Support and Maintenance Squadrons

- 23rd Munitions Maintenance Squadron: 1 July 1960 – 1 October 1972
- 42nd Airborne Missile Maintenance Squadron: 1 November 1962 – 30 September 1974
- 42nd Armament & Electronics Maintenance Squadron (later 42nd Avionics Maintenance Squadron): 25 February 1953 – 31 October 1990
- 42nd Comptroller Squadron: 30 September 1994 – present
- 42nd Field Maintenance Squadron: 25 February 1953 – 1 September 1991
- 42nd Munitions Maintenance Squadron: 1 October 1972 – 1 September 1991
- 42nd Operations Squadron (later 42nd Operations Support Squadron): 1 October 1994 – c. September 2002
- 42nd Periodic Maintenance Squadron (later 42nd Organizational Maintenance Squadron): 25 February 1953 – 1 September 1991
- 42nd Supply Squadron: 1 October 1961 – 1 July 1963, July 1974 – 1979
- 42nd Transportation Squadron: July 1974 – 1979
- 2192nd Communications Squadron: 1 October 1990 – 1 September 1991

Other

- 4030th USAF Hospital: 15 February – 1 October 1954 (attached to 42nd Air Base Group after 1 April 1954), 1 January – 1 December 1958, 1 January – 1 July 1959
- 886th Chemical Company, Air Operations (Medium & Heavy): attached August 1944 – 1945

=== Stations ===
- Fort Douglas, Utah, 15 January 1941
- Gowen Field, Idaho c. 3 June 1941
- McChord Field, Washington, c. 18 January 1942 – 15 March 1943
- Nandi Airfield, Viti Levu, Fiji Islands, 22 April 1943 (air echelon)
- Carney Field, Guadalcanal, Solomon Islands, 11 May 1943 (ground echelon), 6 June 1943 (air echelon)
- Renard Field, Banika Russell Islands, c. 21 October 1943
- Stirling Airfield, Stirling Island, Solomon Islands, 20 January 1944
- Cyclops Airstrip, Hollandia, New Guinea, Netherlands East Indies, 24 August 1944 (air echelon)
- Mar Airstrip, Sansapor, New Guinea, Netherlands East Indies, 24 August 1944 (ground echelon), c. 15 September 1944 (air echelon)
- Wama Airfield, Morotai, Netherlands East Indies, 23 February 1945 (air echelon)
- Puerto Princesa Airfield, Palawan, Philippines, March 1945
- Itami Air Base, Japan, 31 January – 10 May 1946
- Limestone Air Force Base (later Loring Air Force Base), Maine, 25 February 1953 – 30 September 1994
- Maxwell Air Force Base (later Maxwell-Gunter Air Force Base), Alabama, 1 October 1994 – present

=== Aircraft ===
- Douglas B-18 Bolo, 1941–1942
- Martin B-26 Marauder, 1941–1942, 1943
- Lockheed A-29 Hudson, 1942–1943
- North American B-25 Mitchell, 1942, 1943–1945
- Douglas A-26 Invader, 1946
- Douglas A-20 Havoc, 1946
- Convair B-36 Peacemaker, 1953–1956
- Boeing KC-97 Stratofreighter, 1955–1957
- Boeing B-52nd Stratofortress, 1956–1959
- Boeing B-52G Stratofortress, 1959–1993
- Boeing KC-135A Stratotanker, 1957 – c. 1985
- Boeing KC-135R Stratotanker, c. 1985–1992

=== Awards and campaigns ===
Award streamer	Award	Dates	Notes
	Distinguished Unit Citation	23 June 1945 – 30 June 1945	Balikpapan, Borneo 42nd Bombardment Group
	Air Force Outstanding Unit Award	1 July 1986 – 30 June 1988	42nd Bombardment Wing
	Air Force Outstanding Unit Award	1 June 1994 – 30 June 1995	42nd Bombardment Wing (later 42nd Air Base Wing)
	Air Force Outstanding Unit Award	1 July 1995 – 30 June 1996	42nd Air Base Wing
	Air Force Outstanding Unit Award	1 July 1996 – 30 June 1997	42nd Air Base Wing
	Air Force Outstanding Unit Award	1 July 1999 – 30 June 2000	42nd Air Base Wing
	Air Force Outstanding Unit Award	1 July 2001 – 30 June 2002	42nd Air Base Wing
	Air Force Outstanding Unit Award	1 July 2002 – 30 June 2004	42nd Air Base Wing
	Air Force Outstanding Unit Award	1 July 2004 – 30 June 2006	42nd Air Base Wing
	Air Force Outstanding Unit Award	1 July 2006 – 30 June 2007	42nd Air Base Wing
	Philippine Republic Presidential Unit Citation	1945	42nd Bombardment Group

Campaign Streamer	Campaign	Dates	Notes
	Antisubmarine	20 March 1942 – 15 March 1943	42nd Bombardment Group
	New Guinea	c. 7 August 1944 – 31 December 1944	42nd Bombardment Group
	Northern Solomons	15 April 1943 – 21 November 1944	42nd Bombardment Group
	Bismarck Archipelago	15 December 1943 – 27 November 1944	42nd Bombardment Group
	Western Pacific	17 April 1944 – 2 September 1945	42nd Bombardment Group
	Leyte	17 October 1944 – 1 July 1945	42nd Bombardment Group
	Luzon	15 December 1944 – 4 July 1945	42nd Bombardment Group
	Southern Philippines	27 February 1945 – 4 July 1945	42nd Bombardment Group
	China Defensive	24 February 1945 – 4 May 1945	42nd Bombardment Group
	China Offensive	5 May 1945 – 2 September 1945	42nd Bombardment Group
	World War II Army of Occupation (Japan)	31 January 1946 – 10 May 1946	42nd Bombardment Group
	Defense of Saudi Arabia	2 August 1990 – 16 January 1991	42nd Bombardment Wing
	Liberation and Defense of Kuwait	17 January 1991 – 11 April 1991	42nd Bombardment Wing

== See also ==
- List of B-52 Units of the United States Air Force
- List of USAF Bomb Wings and Wings assigned to Strategic Air Command
