= 502d Air Base Wing =

502d Air Base Wing

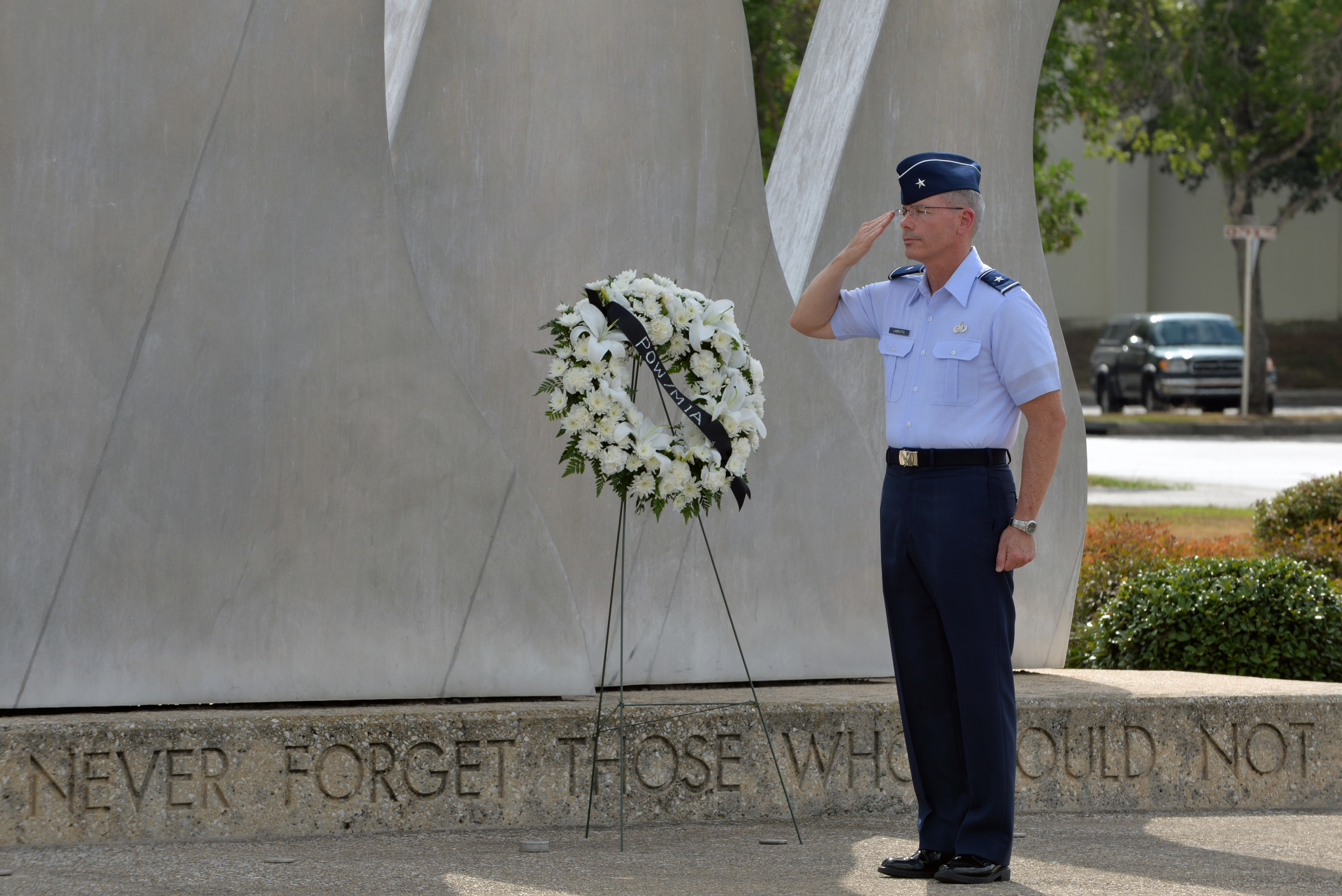
- 502d Air Base Wing, Brig Gen Bob LaBrutta at a ceremony at Joint Base San Antonio-Randolph honoring POW/MIA
- Active: 1947–1948; 1948–1994; 2009–present
- Country: United States
- Branch: United States Air Force
- Role: Regional Support
- Part of: Air Education and Training Command
- Garrison/HQ: Joint Base San Antonio
- Decorations: Air Force Outstanding Unit Award

Commanders
- Current commander: Brig. Gen. David J. Wilson
- Vice Commander: Colonel Patrick J. Miller
- Command Chief Master Sergeant: Chief Master Sgt. Lance R. Power

Insignia
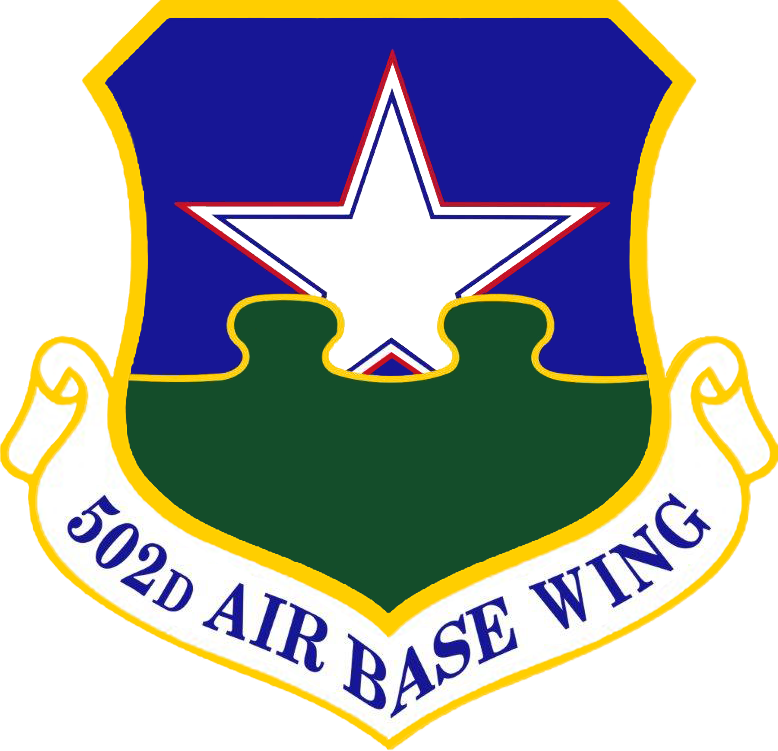
- 502d Air Base Wing emblem (approved 8 July 1954)

The 502d Air Base Wing is a United States Air Force unit that provides installation support for Joint Base San Antonio. The 502d activated on 1 August 2009. The wing's three Mission Support Groups perform the installation support mission at each major installation in the San Antonio area.

The mission of the wing is to meet the needs of all three installations of JBSA, their missions and people and to optimize installation support while maximizing opportunities for greater joint military and community cooperation. This mission is carried out through the Mission Support Group located on each JBSA base.

== History ==
The 502d Air Base Wing traces it lineage back to 1947. On 17 November 1947, the Air Force organized and activated the 502d Air University Wing (502 AUW) at Maxwell Field, in Montgomery, Alabama. The Air Force, which became a separate service on two months before, initiated a re-organization program that decentralized operations and provided for easier and quicker mobility of tactical units. As part of the re-organization, the Air Force inactivated the 42d Army Air Force Base Unit, and activated the 502 AUW in its place. Personnel and equipment from the 42d transferred to the 502 AUW. Under the command of Col. William E. Covington Jr., the 502 AUW provided logistical support and base services for Air University and other base agencies on or near Maxwell Field and nearby Gunter Field. The 502 AUW performed the installation support mission for less than a year when the Air Force disestablished the wing on 27 July 1948 and established, organized and activated the 3800th Air University Wing in its place on 28 July 1948. The 3800th, under various designations, carried out the installation support mission at Maxwell and Gunter for the next 44 years.

In 1992, then Air Force Chief of Staff, General Merrill A. McPeak ordered a major reorganization of the Air Force. As part of the re-organization, the general decided that all four-digit MAJCON units should be redesignated as three-digit units. Because of this, Air Training Command (ATC) consolidated the history of the 502 AUW with the now designated 3800th Air Base Wing on 1 October 1992. That same day, ATC redesignated the 3800th Air Base Wing as the 502d Air Base Wing (502 ABW). The 502 ABW continued to perform the installation support mission at Maxwell and Gunter until 1 October 1994. That day, the 502 ABW inactivated once again and the 42d Air Base Wing took over installation support for Maxwell and Gunter.

On 9 November 2005, President George W. Bush endorsed the recommendations of the Base Realignment and Closure Commission and signed them into law. One of the recommendations called for the implementation of joint basing. Joint basing involved a single entity that managed the support functions of two or more adjacent DoD installations. The commission felt that combined support functions eliminated duplicated efforts and created a single efficient organization. For San Antonio, the commission recommended joint basing for the three major installations around the city; Fort Sam Houston, Lackland Air Force Base, and Randolph Air Force Base. The Air Force, as the lead service for Joint Base San Antonio (JBSA), looked to one of the few wings with a history of accomplishing an installation support mission, the 502d Air Base Wing.

On 1 August 2009, the 502 ABW activated once again, this time to perform the joint base administration mission. Because of its central location in San Antonio and Bexar County, Texas, the Air Force activated the wing at Fort Sam Houston. This also marked the return of a major Air Force presence to Fort Sam Houston for the first time since 1917. Unlike its prior activations, the 502 ABW did not replace a unit. The wing gradually built its staff over the next few months, while it coordinated with the support functions at Fort Sam Houston, Lackland AFB, and Randolph AFB, in anticipation of JBSA achieving Initial Operational Capability (IOC). When IOC occurred, the 502 ABW assumed the installation support mission for the three installations.

On 31 January 2010, the 502 ABW took over responsibility as the host unit at Lackland and Randolph. On that day, the 12th Mission Support Group at Randolph inactivated and the 902d Mission Support Group activated in its place. Meanwhile, the 37th Mission Support Group at Lackland inactivated and the 802d Mission Support Group activated in its place. At Fort Sam Houston, the wing assumed IOC on 30 April 2010 when the 502d Mission Support Group (502 MSG) activated. The 502 MSG also provided installation support for Camp Bullis in northwestern Bexar County. The three groups and their subordinate squadrons accomplished the various installation support missions for each JBSA installation. The U.S. Army Garrison at Fort Sam Houston remained active alongside the 502 MSG until JBSA achieved Full Operational Capability (FOC) on 1 October 2010.

The 502 ABW became the host unit for Fort Sam Houston, Lackland AFB, and Randolph AFB. While all three installations and Camp Bullis (supported by Fort Sam Houston) make up JBSA, none share a fence line, and each maintains its historical identity.

== Units ==
As of 2021, the 502d Air Base Wing consists of the following subordinate units

502d Force Support Group

- 502d Force Support Squadron
- 802d Force Support Squadron
- 502d FSG Judge Advocate
- Garrison Chaplaincy
- JBSA-Camp Bullis

502d Installation Support Group

- 502d Communications Squadron
- 502d Operations Support Squadron
- 502d Logistics Readiness Squadron
- 502d Training Development Squadron
- 502d ISG Judge Advocate

502d Security Forces Group

- 502d Security Forces Squadron
- 802d Security Forces Squadron
- 902d Security Forces Squadron
- 502d SFG Judge Advocate

502d Civil Engineering Group

- 502d Civil Engineering Squadron
- 802d Civil Engineering Squadron
- 902d Civil Engineering Squadron

== Lineage ==
502d Air University Wing

- Established as the 502d Air University Wing and organized on 17 November 1947

Disestablished on 27 Jul 1948

- Consolidated with the 3800th Air Base Wing as the 502d Air Base Wing on 1 October 1992

502d Air Base Wing

- Established as the 3800th Air University Wing and organized, on 28 July 1948

Redesignated 3800th Air Base Wing on 1 September 1954
Redesignated 3800th Air Base Group on 2 January 1979
Redesignated 3800th Air Base Wing on 21 July 1983

- Consolidated with the 502d Air University Wing and redesignated 502d Air Base Wing on 1 October 1992

Inactivated on 1 October 1994

- Activated on 1 August 2009

=== Assignments ===
- Air University, 17 November 1947 – 27 July 1948
- Air University, 28 July 1948 – 1 October 1994
- Air Education and Training Command, 1 August 2009 – present

=== Components ===
Groups

- 502d Airdrome Group, 17 November 1947 – 27 July 1948
- 502d Civil Engineer Group, 1 September 2018
- 502d Mission Support Group (later 502d Force Support Group), 30 April 2010 – c. 4 December 2013
- 502d Installation Support Group, c. 4 December 2013
- 502d Maintenance & Supply Group, 17 November 1947 – 27 July 1948
- 502d Station Medical Group, 17 November 1947 – 27 July 1948
- 802d Mission Support Group, 31 January 2010 – c. 4 December 2013

Lackland Air Force Base

- 902d Mission Support Group, 31 January 2010 – c. 4 December 2013

Randolph Air Force Base

- 3801st Maintenance & Supply Group (later 3801st Operations Group), 28 July 1948 – 1 February 1961
- 3810th Station Medical Group (later 3810th USAF Hospital; USAF Hospital, Maxwell; USAF Regional Hospital, Maxwell, 28 July 1948 – 1 October 1992

=== Stations ===
- Maxwell Field (later Maxwell Air Force Base), Alabama, 17 November 1947 – 27 July 1948
- Maxwell Air Force Base, Alabama, 28 July 1948 – 1 Oct 1994
- Joint Base San Antonio-Randolph (Fort Sam Houston), TX, 1 August 2009 – present
