= List of USAF Bomb Wings and Wings assigned to Strategic Air Command =

List of USAF Bomb Wings and Wings assigned to the Strategic Air Command and brief information of the unit; including unit nickname, lineage, reassignments, aircraft assignments, and link to main Wikipedia articles for that unit.

Includes 2d Bomb Wing; 5th Bomb Wing; 6th Bomb Wing; 7th Bomb Wing; 9th Bomb Wing; and the 11th Wing, which was assigned to Altus Air Force Base, Oklahoma, composed of B-52E aircraft. Consisted of 26th Bombardment Squadron, and KC-135 Stratotankers of the 91st Air Refueling Squadron.

== 17th Wings "Ever into Danger" ==
See 17th Training Wing

== 19th Wings "On Wings We Conquer" ==
See 19th Bomb Wing

== 22d Bomb Wing "We Lead" ==
See also 22d Air Refueling Wing

- Established on: 28 July 1948.
- Activated on: 1 August 1948.
- At: Smoky Hill AFB, KS.
- Assigned to: Fifteenth Air Force. Attached to the 301st Bomb Wing from 1 August 1948 to 9 May 1949.
- Equipment: B-29s, F-86s.
- Moved to: March AFB, CA, on 10 May 1949.
- Changed equipment in: 1951 to B-29s.
- Reassigned to: Fifteenth Air Force, 12th Air Division on 10 February 1951. (Attached to the 7th Air Division from 5 September to 4 December 1951 and 7 December 1953 to 5 March 1954). (Attached to the 3rd Air Division from 14 April to 5 July 1957).
- Changed equipment in: 1952 to B-29s, KC-97s.
- Changed equipment in: 1953 to B-29s, B-47s, KC-97s.
- Reassigned to: Fifteenth Air Force, 47th Air Division on 1 January 1962.
- Reassigned to: Fifteenth Air Force, 47th Strategic Aerospace Division on 1 July 1963.
- Changed equipment in: 1963 to B-47s, B-52s, EC-135s, KC-135s.
- Changed equipment in: 1964 to B-52s, EC-135s, KC-135s.
- Reassigned to: Second Air Force, 47th Air Division on 31 March 1970.
- Reassigned to: Fifteenth Air Force, 14th Strategic Aerospace Division on 31 March 1970.
- Changed equipment in: 1971 to B-52s, KC-135s.
- Reassigned to: Fifteenth Air Force, 47th Air Division on 30 June 1971.
- Reassigned to: Fifteenth Air Force, 12th Strategic Missile Division on 1 August 1972.
- Reassigned to: Fifteenth Air Force, 12th Air Division on 1 March 1973.
- Redesignated on: 22nd Air Refueling Wing on 1 October 1982.

From 1 August 1948 to 9 May 1949, while based at Smoky Hill AFB, KS shared a commander in common with the 301st Bombardment Wing. The 330th Bomb Wing was attached from 27 June 1949 to 30 April 1951. The 22d Wing's headquarters was at the time non-operational and its components detached. From 10 May 1949 to 16 February 1950, after moving to March AFB, CA, shared a commander in common with the 1st Fighter Wing. Until 1 July 1949, the 22nd Wing was non-operational, attached to the 1st Fighter Wing, but on 1 July 1949 the 22nd was made operational and assumed host status, with the 1st Fighter Wing attached to it for control until 1 April 1950. The 22nd Bombardment Group was detached from 14 November 1949 to 20 February 1950, during which time the wing controlled only the attached fighters of the 1st Fighter Wing. The bomb group was detached again for combat in Korea, 4 July – c. 31 October 1950, and during this period the wing controlled no aircraft. When operational, the wing trained to maintain proficiency in global strategic bombardment, adding Air refueling to its mission in 1952. The wing deployed at Mildenhall RAF Station, England, September–December 1951, and at Upper Heyford RAF Station, England, December 1953 – March 1954. From April to July 1957, it deployed at Andersen AFB, Guam. The wing was not tactically operational 11 March – 15 September 1963, while converting to B-52 bombers and KC-135 tankers. Supported Fifteenth Air Force's post-attack command and control system (PACCS) with EC-135s, September 1964 – March 1970. The 22nd was a "super" wing, 1966–1971, with two bombardment and two tanker squadrons. From 10 March to c. 1 October 1967 the wing was reduced to a small "rear-echelon" non-tactical organization with all tactical resources and most support resources loaned to SAC organizations involved in combat operations in Southeast Asia. The wing continued to support SAC operations in the Far East and Southeast Asia through 1975, and from 10 April 1972 to 29 October 1973 again had its entire bomber resources loaned to other organizations for combat and contingency operations. KC-135 resources were also on loan from 10 April to September 1972; afterwards a few tankers returned to wing control. The wing maintained a strategic bombardment alert posture, 1973–1982, and in 1978 it assumed additional conventional warfare missions, including mine-laying and sea reconnaissance/surveillance. Lost bombardment mission in 1982 and equipped with KC-135 and KC-10 aircraft. Thereafter, provided strategic Air refueling and airlift in support of worldwide USAF and other DOD operations and training exercises. Moved personnel and cargo in support of Chadian resistance to Libyan incursions in 1983 and conducted airlift and refueling missions during rescue of US nationals in Grenada, 1983. Provided specialized refueling support to SR-71 aircraft reconnaissance operations worldwide, c. 1985–1990, and to the F-117 stealth aircraft program, c. 1987-Supported F-117 deployments to Saudi Arabia and contributed aircraft and personnel to logistics efforts in support of the liberation of Kuwait, 1990–

== 28th Wings "Guardian of the North" ==
see 28th Bomb Wing

== 40th Bomb Wing ==
See 40th Air Expeditionary Wing

== 42d Bombardment Wing "The Skies For Us" ==
- Established on: 19 February 1953
- Activated on: 25 February 1953.
- At: Limestone AFB, ME.
- Assigned to: Eighth Air Force.
- Equipment: B-36s.
- Reassigned to: Eighth Air Force, 45th Air Division on 8 October 1954. (Attached to the 7th Air Division from 18 October to 18 November 1955).
- Changed equipment in: 1955 to B-36s, KC-97s.
- Changed equipment in: 1956 to B-36s, B-52s, KC-97s.
- Changed equipment in: 1957 to B-52s, KC-97s, KC-135s.
- Changed equipment in: 1958 to B-52s, KC-135s.
- Reassigned to: Eighth Air Force on 18 January 1958.
- Reassigned to: Eighth Air Force. 45th Air Division on 1 December 1958.
- Reassigned to: Second Air Force, 45th Air Division on 31 March 1970.
- Reassigned to: Eighth Air Force, 45th Air Division on 1 January 1975.
- Reassigned to: Eighth Air Force on 25 March 1989.
- Redesignated on: 1 September 1991 as 42d Wing.
- Reassigned to: Air Combat Command, Eighth Air Force on 31 May 1992.

== 43d Bomb Wing "Willing, Ready, Able" ==
See also 43d Airlift Wing

- Established on: 3 November 1947.
- &Organized on: 17 November 1947.
- At: Davis–Monthan AFB, AZ
- Assigned to: Eighth Air Force.
- Equipment: B-29s.
- Changed equipment in: 1948 to B-29s, B-50s.
- Changed equipment in: 1949 to B-29s, KB-29s, B-50s.
- Reassigned to: Fifteenth Air Force on 1 April 1950.
- Changed equipment in: 1951 to KB-29s, B-50s.
- Reassigned to: Fifteenth Air Force, 36th Air Division on 4 September 1951. (Attached to the 7th Air Division from 10 March to 5 June 1953). (Attached to the 3rd Air Division from 1 July to 1 October 1957).
- Changed equipment in: 1953 to KB-29s, B-50s, KC-97s.
- Changed equipment in: 1954 to B-47s, B-50s, KC-97s.
- Changed equipment in: 1955 to B-47s, KC-97s.
- Moved to: Carswell AFB, TX on 15 March 1960.
- Changed equipment in: 1960 to B-47s, B-58s, TB-58s, YRB-58s, KC-97s.
- Reassigned to: Second Air Force, 19th Air Division on 15 March 1960. (Attached to the 825th Strategic Aerospace Division from 19 to 31 August 1964).
- Changed equipment in: 1960 to B-58s, TB-58s, TF-102s.
- Changed equipment in: 1963 to B-58, TB-58s.
- Moved to: Little Rock AFB, AR on 1 September 1964.
- Reassigned to: Second Air Force, 825th Strategic Aerospace Division on 1 September 1964.
- Changed equipment in: 1964 to B-58s, TB-58s, KC-135s.
- Reassigned to: Second Air Force, 42nd Air Division on 1 January 1970.
- Inactivated on: 31 January 1970.
- Reactivated in: 4 November 1986.
- At: Andersen AFB, Guam.
- Assigned to: Fifteenth Air Force, 3rd Air Division.
- Equipment: B-52s, KC-135s.
- Inactivated on: 30 September 1990.

Strategic bombardment training, 1947–1960, and air refueling, 1949–1960, to meet Strategic Air Command's global commitments. Wing personnel established flight records, flying two B-29s around the world in 1948 in 15 days, flying the B-50 Lucky Lady II nonstop around the world in 94 hours and 40 seconds in 1949, and setting a jet endurance record in 1954 by keeping a B-47 airborne for 47:35 hours. Converted to B-58 aircraft, the world's first supersonic bomber, in 1960. From March 1960 to July 1961 operated a combat crew training school for B-58 aircrews, and from July 1962 until late 1969 served as one of two SAC B-58 wings with a strategic bombardment mission. During the 1960s the wing established world flight speed records in the B-58. For example, in May 1961, a wing B-58 flew from New York to Paris in 3 hours, 14 minutes, and 45 seconds, establishing a new transatlantic speed record of 1,089.36 mph. During a race in 1962, a wing B-58 flew from Los Angeles to New York at an average speed of 1,214.65 mph. It flew from Los Angeles to New York and back in 4 hours, 41 minutes, and 15 seconds. The wing also controlled an air refueling squadron from August 1964 until inactivation in January 1970. It activated again in April 1970, replacing the 3960 Strategic Wing at Andersen AFB, Guam. On 1 July 1970, the 43d also assumed tasks formerly handled by the Bombardment Wing Provisional, 4133, including a combat mission. Employed attached aircraft and aircrews of other Strategic Air Command units to participate in "Arc Light" combat missions in Southeast Asia from 1 July to mid-August 1970, and again from February 1972 to August 1973. Following the end of combat operations, provided routing training and ground alert with B-52 and KC-135 aircraft, the latter provided by other Strategic Air Command units on loan. During 1975, provided logistical and medical support to thousands of Vietnamese refugees evacuated from their homeland and located temporarily at Guam awaiting resettlement in the United States. Trained to remain proficient in strategic and conventional warfare capabilities. Beginning in 1974, controlled TDY tankers and crews participating in the Pacific (formerly Andersen) Tanker Task Force that supported Strategic Air Command operations in the western Pacific. In July 1986, activated the 65 Strategic Squadron to control the TDY air refueling forces.

== 44th Wings "Aggressors Beware" ==
See 44th Missile Wing

== 55th Wings "We See All" ==
See 55th Wing

== 68th Bomb Wing "Follow Me" ==
See 68th Air Refueling Wing

- Redesignated on: 16 June 1952.
- At: Lake Charles AFB, LA.
- Assigned to: Second Air Force.
- Equipment: B-29s.
- Reassigned to: Second Air Force, 806th Air Division on 16 June 1952. (Attached to the 7th Air Division from 14 June to 7 August 1954). (Attached to the 7th Air Division from 27 September 1957 to 8 January 1958).
- Changed equipment in: 1953 to B-29s, B-47s, KC-97s.
- Changed equipment in: 1954 to B-47s, KC-97s.
- Changed equipment in: 1958 to B-47s.
- Reassigned to: Second Air Force, 825th Air Division on 15 June 1960
- Reassigned to: Eighth Air Force, 822nd Air Division on 15 April 1963.
- Moved to: Seymour Johnson AFB, NC on 15 April 1963.
- Changed equipment in: 1963 to B-47s, B-52s, KC-135s.
- Changed equipment in: 1963 to B-52s, KC-135s.
- Reassigned to: Eighth Air Force, 57th Air Division on 1 July 1964.
- Reassigned to: Eighth Air Force, 822nd Air Division on 1 July 1965.
- Reassigned to: Eighth Air Force, 57th Air Division on 2 September 1966.
- Reassigned to: Eighth Air Force, 823rd Air Division on 2 July 1969.
- Reassigned to: Second Air Force, 823rd Air Division on 31 March 1970.
- Reassigned to: Second Air Force, 42nd Air Division on 30 June 1971.
- Reassigned to: Eighth Air Force, 42nd Air Division on 1 January 1975.
- Redesignated on: 30 September 1982 as 68th Air refueling Group.
- Redesignated on: 1 October 1986 as 68th Air Refueling Wing.

Received initial cadre of 16 people from 44th Bombardment Wing in October 1951. Began operational training as a reconnaissance wing using borrowed B-29s in October 1951. Received own B-29s in May 1952 and trained as a bombardment wing. Converted to B-47s in late 1953. Added a refueling mission in November 1953. Conducted strategic bombardment training (May 1954 – June 1963) and air refueling (May 1954 – September 1957) to meet SAC's global commitments. Deployed at Fairford RAF Station, England, 14 June – 7 August 1954 and at Brize Norton AB, England, 27 September 1957 – 8 January 1958. Moved without personnel or equipment to NC on 15 April 1963, replacing 4241st Strategic Wing at Seymour Johnson AFB. Conducted strategic bombardment training with B-52s and air refueling with KC-135s beginning April 1963. Deployed at Loring AFB, Maine, 28 July – 28 August 1965. From 27 May 1972 to 15 July 1973, all wing aircraft, most air-crew and maintenance personnel, and about half of the wing's support people loaned to other SAC units for combat operations in Southeast Asia.

== 70th Bomb Wing "Strength through Unity" ==
See 70th Intelligence Wing

- Activated on: 1 November 1962.
- Organized on: 1 February 1963.
- At Clinton-Sherman AFB, OK.
- Assigned to: Strategic Air Command.
- Equipment: B-52s, KC-135s.
- Reassigned to: Second Air Force, 816th Strategic Aerospace Division on 1 February 1963.
- Reassigned to: Eighth Air Force, 17th Strategic Aerospace Division on 1 July 1965.
- Inactivated on: 31 December 1969.

== 72d Bomb Wing ==
See 72d Air Base Wing

== 90th Bomb Wing "Undaunted" ==
See 90th Missile Wing

- Reestablished on: 20 December 1950.
- Activated on: 2 January 1951.
- At: Fairchild AFB, WA.
- Assigned to: Fifteenth Air Force. (Attached to 92nd Bomb Wing from 2 to 31 January 1951).
- Equipment: B-29s, RB-29s, TB-29s.
- Reassigned to: Strategic Air Command, 21st Air Division on 14 March 1951.
- Moved to: Forbes AFB, KS, on 14 March 1951.
- Reassigned to: Fifteenth Air Force, 21st Air Division on 16 October 1952.
- Changed equipment in: 1953 to B-29s, KB-29s, RB-29s.
- Changed equipment in: 1954 to KB-29s, RB-47s, KC-97s
- Reassigned to: Eighth Air Force, 21st Air Division on 1 July 1955.
- Redesignated on: 90th Strategic Reconnaissance Wing 15 June 1956.

Served as operational training unit for B-29 aircrews and mechanics of the 376th, 308th, and 310th Bombardment Wings, in turn, May 1951 – September 1952; as replacement training unit for B-29 aircrews (June 1951 – August 1953) and RB-29 aircrews (November 1952 – August 1953) for Far East Air Forces. Also trained Shoran personnel, SAC-wide, November 1952 – November 1953. Flew strategic reconnaissance missions, September 1953 – May 1958, and Air refueling missions, February 1956 – June 1960. Served as RB-47 combat crew training wing, May 1958 – June 1960. Deployed at Eielson AFB, Alaska, 5 May – 31 August 1955. Not operational, June 1960 – June 1963.

== 91st Bomb Wing "Poised for Peace" ==
See 91st Missile Wing

- Activated on: 16 November 1962.
- Organized on: 1 February 1963.
- At: Glasgow AFB, MT.
- Assigned to: Strategic Air Command.
- Equipment: B-52s, KC-135s.
- Reassigned to: Fifteenth Air Force, 810th Strategic Aerospace Division on 1 February 1963.
- Reassigned to: Fifteenth Air Force, 18th Strategic Aerospace Division on 1 July 1963.
- Reassigned to: Fifteenth Air Force, 821st Strategic Aerospace Division on 1 September 1964.
- Reassigned to: Fifteenth Air Force, 810th Strategic Aerospace Division on 1 July 1966. (Attached to Advanced Echelon, 3rd Air Division from 5 February to 15 April 1968).
- Redesignated as: 91st Strategic Missile Wing on 25 June 1968.

Performed global strategic reconnaissance, 1948–1957, with emphasis on aerial photography and mapping, 1948–1950; added aerial refueling mission, 1950–1957. Wing headquarters integrated with headquarters of 301st Bombardment Wing, 1 April 1950 – 9 February 1951, although each wing continued tactical operations independently. Tactical components occasionally detached for periods up to three months for duty with other USAF establishments. More frequently, wing maintained operational detachments consisted of aircraft and crews drawn from several components to provide reconnaissance support in overseas areas. Such detachments were maintained in England, 19 January 1951 – 20 March 1952; 18 March – 11 May 1952; 21 October – 12 December 1952 and 8 April – 9 May 1954; in Japan, 23 March 1951 – 30 November 1953; in north Africa, 3 August – 4 November 1956; in Newfoundland, 3 August – 2 November 1956; and in Greenland, 1 October – 8 November 1957. Won the SAC reconnaissance, photographic, and navigation competition and the P. T. Cullen Award in 1955 and 1956. From August to November 1956 most of the wing deployed overseas in detachments not under operational control of the small establishment remaining in the United States. Inactivated in November 1957. Activated in February 1963 as a bombardment wing to train for global bombardment and aerial refueling. Except for a small rear echelon, the wing's headquarters staff, tactical aircraft and crews, and most support personnel integrated in the Strategic Air Command Arc Light force for combat in Southeast Asia, c. 11 September 1966 – c. 31 March 1967. Deployed in Okinawa in response to the Pueblo incident, 5 February – c. 15 April 1968. Not tactically operational c. 1 May – 25 June 1968 while closing Glasgow AFB, Montana. Moved without personnel or equipment on 25 June 1968 to Minot AFB, North Dakota, absorbing personnel and equipment of an inactivated missile wing.

== 92d Bomb Wing "Twofold Security" ==
See 92nd Air Refueling Wing

- Established on: 17 November 1947.
- Organized on: 17 November 1947.
- At: Spokane AFB, WA.
- Assigned to: Fifteenth Air Force.
- Equipment: B-29s.
- Reassigned to: Fifteenth Air Force, 57th Air Division on 16 April 1951. (Attached to the 3rd Air Division from 16 October 1954 to 12 January 1955). (Attached to the 3rd Air Division from 26 April 1956 to 6 July 1956).
- Changed equipment in: 1951 to B-29, B-36s.
- Changed equipment in: 1953 to B-36s.
- Reassigned to: Fifteenth Air Force on 4 September 1956.
- Changed equipment in: 1957 to B-36s, B-52s, KB-29s.
- Changed equipment in: 1958 to B-52s, KC-135s.
- Reassigned to: Fifteenth Air Force, 18th Air Division on 1 July 1959.
- Changed equipment in: 1961 to B-52s, KC-135s, Atlas.
- Redesignated as: 92nd Strategic Aerospace Wing on 15 February 1962.
- Redesignated on: 31 March 1972.
- At: Fairchild AFB, WA.
- Assigned to: Fifteenth Air Force, 47th Air Division.
- Equipment: B-52s, KC-135s.
- Reassigned to: Fifteenth Air Force, 57th Air Division on 23 January 1987.
- Reassigned to: Fifteenth Air Force on 15 June 1988.
- Changed equipment in: 1991 to B-52s, KC-135s, T-37s.
- Redesignated on: 1 September 1991 as 92nd Wing at Fairchild AFB, WA and assigned to Fifteenth Air Force.
- Equipment: B-52s, KC-135s, T-37s.
- Reassigned to: Air Combat Command, Eighth Air Force on 1 June 1992.

Served as a double-sized B-29 wing, November 1947 – April 1950, and May 1950 – April 1951, although one bomb group was generally deployed overseas for training or combat in Korea. Supervised a Reserve corollary bomb group, June 1949 – February 1951. Pioneered mass B-36 deployments to the Far East, August–September 1953. Deployed at Andersen AFB, Guam, 16 October 1954 – 12 January 1955 and 26 April – 6 July 1956. Added air refueling operations to bombardment mission in September 1957. From July 1961 to August 1965, controlled an Atlas missile squadron. Supported SAC activities in Southeast Asia from early 1965 to December 1975 through deployment of bomber and tanker aircraft and crews. From March–September 1968, March–September 1969, and June 1972 – October 1973, all wing B-52s and many KC-135s, plus aircrews and support personnel, were involved in Southeast Asia operations. After 1975, performed joint USAF/Navy sea reconnaissance and surveillance missions. In 1983, the Wing's B-52Gs were modified to carry AGM-86B Air-Launched Cruise Missiles (ALCM). In 1985, upgraded to B-52H with improved strategic weapons carriage and offensive electronics capabilities. Earned the Fairchild Trophy in 1953, 1986, and again in 1992 when it won SAC's last competition and retired the trophy. Also won the Saunders Trophy for best air refueling unit in SAC for 1992. Provided KC-135 aircraft to tanker task forces in the US, Europe, and the Pacific through 1992.

== 93d Wings "Twofold Security" ==
See 93d Air-Ground Operations Wing

=== 93d Bomb Wing ===
- Established on: 28 July 1947.
- Organized on: 15 August 1947.
- At: Castle AAF, CA.
- Assigned to: Fifteenth Air Force. (Attached to the 7th Air Division from 6 December 1951 to 6 March 1952).
- Equipment: B-29s.
- Changed equipment in: 1949 to B-29's, B-50s.
- Changed equipment in: 1950 to KB-29s, B-50s.
- Changed equipment in: 1953 to KB-29s, B-50s, KC-97s.
- Changed equipment in: 1954 to B-47s, B-50s, KC-97s.
- Changed equipment in: 1955 to B-52s, B-47s, KC-97s.
- Changed equipment in: 1957 to B-52s, KC-97s, KC-135s.
- Changed equipment in: 1958 to B-52s, KC-135s.
- Reassigned to: Fifteenth Air Force, 47th Air Division on 1 July 1959.
- Reassigned to: Fifteenth Air Force, 47th Strategic Aerospace Division on 1 May 1962.
- Reassigned to: Fifteenth Air Force, 47th Air Division on 1 July 1963.
- Reassigned to: Second Air Force, 47th Air Division on 31 March 1970.
- Reassigned to: Second Air Force on 30 June 1971.
- Reassigned to: Fifteenth Air Force on 15 February 1973.
- Reassigned to: Fifteenth Air Force, 14th Air Division on 1 October 1976.
- Reassigned to: Fifteenth Air Force, 12th Air Division on 1 October 1985.
- Reassigned to: Fifteenth Air Force on 15 July 1988.
- Redesignated on: 1 September 1991 as 93d Wing.
- At: Castle AFB, CA.
- Assigned to: Fifteenth Air Force.
- Equipment: B-52s, KC-135s.
- Reassigned to: Air Combat Command, Eighth Air Force on 31 May 1992.

Maintained combat readiness for global strategic bombardment, August 1947 – February 1956. The wing's 93d Bombardment Group deployed to Okinawa in 1948, becoming the first SAC bomb group to deploy in full strength to the Far East. The wing began aerial refueling operations in October 1950. It deployed its tactical force, augmented by support personnel, to England, July 1950 – January 1951. The entire wing deployed to England, December 1951 – March 1952. Provided aerial refueling and navigational assistance for the July 1952 movement of the 31st Fighter-Escort Wing from the United States to Japan, the first jet fighter crossing of the Pacific Ocean, during the Korean War. First SAC wing to convert to B-52 aircraft, 1955–1956. Became SAC's primary B-52 aircrew training organization, incorporating KC-135 aircrew training for refueling in mid-1956. Notable operations: non-stop B-52 flights of some 16,000 miles around North America and to the North Pole (November 1956); first jet aircraft nonstop flight around the world (January 1957); nonstop, unrefueled KC-135 flight from Yokota AB, Japan, to Washington, DC (April 1958). During the 1970s, specially equipped B-52H models conducted long distance, high altitude (50,000+ feet) air sampling missions after Chinese H-bomb tests using special ram scoop modules installed in the forward bomb bay. Although most of the wing's components were used for B-52 and KC-135 aircrew training between 1956 and 1995, one or more of its units sometimes participated in tactical operations, including aerial refueling. From April 1968 to April 1974, operated a special B-52 replacement training unit to support SAC's B-52 operation in Southeast Asia. Won the SAC Bombing and Navigation Competition and the Fairchild Trophy in 1949, 1952, and 1970, and the Omaha Trophy as the outstanding SAC wing in 1970. In August 1990 the wing operated an aerial port of embarkation for personnel and equipment deploying to Southwest Asia during Desert Shield. In addition to aerial refueling, tankers ferried personnel and equipment, while B-52s deployed to strategic locations worldwide, including Saudi Arabia. Bombed the Iraqi Republican Guard and targeted Iraqi chemical weapons, nuclear, and industrial plants during Desert Storm, January–February 1991. Relieved of its air refueling and KC-135 aircrew training missions in 1992.

== 95th Wings "Justice with Victory" ==
See 95th Air Base Wing

== 96th Wings "It is Always the Hour" ==
See 96th Air Base Wing

== 97th Wings "The Hour has Come" ==
=== 97th Bomb Wing ===
See 97th Air Mobility Wing

=== 97th Wing ===
- Redesignated on: 1 September 1991.
- At: Blytheville AFB (later Eaker AFB), AR.
- Assigned to: Eighth Air Force.
- Equipment: B-52s, KC-135s.
- Changed equipment in: 1992 to KC-135s.
- Inactivated on: 1 April 1992.

Flew bombardment training missions from Alaska over the Arctic Ocean, late 1947 and early 1948. Continued bombardment training in the south central United States after March 1948. Transitioned from propeller-driven to jet-driven bombers in 1955. Added air-refueling mission in early 1950. Sent tactical units to England, November 1948 – February 1949 and July 1950 – February 1951. Entire wing deployed in England, 15 March – 11 June 1952, and squadrons operated from Guam, December 1952 – March 1953 and December 1953 – July 1954. Added electronic reconnaissance to bombardment and refueling missions in April 1954, with reconnaissance missions conducted from England and Japan. Relinquished the reconnaissance mission in May 1956 but continued bombardment and air-refueling training to meet the Strategic Air Command (SAC)'s global commitments. Deployed to RAF Upper Heyford, England, May–July 1956. This was the last full-strength wing deployment, but wing components went overseas thereafter as needed. Not operational from 15 January 1959 to 1960. Supported build-up for the Cuban Missile Crisis in October 1962. Supported SAC's combat operations in Southeast Asia in the mid and late 1960s and early 1970s, furnishing aircraft and crews to other organizations. By mid 1972, all of the wing's aircraft and more than one-fourth of its people had been loaned to USAF organizations in the Far East, Southeast Asia, and other overseas locations. A few of the wing's KC-135s began returning in April 1973, but its B-52s remained on loan until October 1973. Thereafter, the wing resumed strategic-bombardment training and worldwide air-refueling operations as required by SAC. Provided air refueling for USAF units supporting the rescue of American citizens in Grenada, October–November 1983. Upgraded its bombers to carry the AGM-86B air-launched cruise missile (ALCM) in 1984 and won SAC's Fairchild Trophy for excellence in bombing and navigation in 1985. In 1987, the wing's mission expanded to include conventional bombing, sea search/surveillance, and aerial mining. In 1988, earned the Omaha Trophy as SAC's outstanding wing. After the Iraqi invasion of Kuwait in August 1990, the 97th deployed KC-135 aircraft and maintenance personnel overseas to support forces in transit to Southwest Asia, and in January–February 1991, its B-52s flew from overseas bases to drop conventional ordnance on Iraqi forces in the Kuwaiti theater of operations. The wing relinquished its ALCMs in March–April 1991 and ended bombardment flying in November 1991 and tanker missions in March 1992. Emblem approved 2 May 1957.

== 98th Bomb Wing "Force for Freedom" ==
See 98th Range Wing

- Established on: 24 October 1947.
- Organized on: 10 November 1947.
- At: Fairchild AFB, WA.
- Assigned to: Fifteenth Air Force, (Attached to the 92nd Bomb Wing from 7 November 1947 to 12 July 1948).
- Equipment: B-29s.
- Inactivated on: 12 July 1948.
- 98th Bomb Wing established on: 28 May 1948.
- Activated on: 12 July 1948.
- At: Fairchild AFB, WA.
- Assigned to: Fifteenth Air Force on 12 July 1948. (Attached to the 92nd Bomb Wing from 12 July 1948 to 15 April 1950).
- Equipment: B-29s.
- Reassigned to: Second Air Force on 16 May 1950. (Remained attached to 92nd Bomb Wing).
- Reassigned to: Fifteenth Air Force on 28 July 1950. (Remained attached to 92nd Bomb Wing. through 31 March 1951). (Attached to Far East Air Force Bomber Command (Provisional)1 April 1951).
- Reassigned to: Fifteenth Air Force, 57th Air Division on 16 April 1951. (Remained attached to Far East Air Force Bomber Command (Provisional) to 25 July 1952.)
- Moved to: Yokota AFB, Japan on 15 August 1953.
- Reassigned to: Fifteenth Air Force on 25 November 1953. Remained attached to Far East Air Force Bomber Command (Provisional) to 17 June 1954).
- Reassigned to: Fifteenth Air Force on 25 November 1953. Remained attached to Far East Air Force Bomber Command Provisional) to 17 June 1954). (Attached to the Twentieth Air Force from 18 June to 25 July 1954).
- Moved to: Lincoln AFB, NE on 25 July 1954.
- Reassigned to: Fifteenth Air Force, 818th Air Division on 11 October 1954.
- Changed equipment in: 1954 to B-47s, KC-97s.
- Reassigned to: Eighth Air Force, 818th Air Division on 1 July 1955. (Attached to the 7th Air Division from 11 November 1955 to 29 January 1956).
- Reassigned to: Second Air Force, 818th Air Division on 1 January 1959.
- Reassigned to: Seconds Air Force, 818th Strategic Aerospace Division on 1 March 1962.
- Changed equipment in: 1964 to B-47s.
- Redesignated as: 98th Strategic Aerospace Wing on 1 February 1964.

From November 1947 to July 1948 and July 1948 to July 1954, wing headquarters was often manned as a "paper" unit with most of its components attached to other establishments for long periods. The wing's tactical group was operational, but under control of other organizations from November 1947 to April 1950 and again from August 1950 through March 1951. On 1 April 1951, wing headquarters deployed to Japan to assume control over combat operations of three tactical squadrons. Combat missions included interdiction of enemy communications and support of United Nations ground forces. Last combat mission flown 25 July 1953. Dropped propaganda leaflets on day of truce two days later. Remained in Japan in combat-ready status for another year. Meanwhile, wing components not deployed in Japan moved to a reopened base in Nebraska to supervise construction in preparation for movement there of deployed wing components. In July 1954, wing components concentrated at Lincoln AFB, NE. Air refueling operations were already underway by then. During next decade, participated in Strategic Air Command's worldwide bombardment training and air refueling commitments. Deployed at Lakenheath RAF Station, England, 11 November 1955 – 29 January 1956. From January 1964 to April 1965, the wing also controlled an Atlas intercontinental ballistic missile (ICBM) squadron. Replaced the 3970th Strategic Wing in Spain on 25 June 1966. For the next decade, the wing had no tactical components assigned, but it used attached KC-135 tankers and crews furnished by other Strategic Air Command wings to provide air refueling support to meet operational commitments of various commands in the eastern Atlantic, most of Europe, North Africa, and the Middle East.

== 99th Bomb Wing "Let Aggressors Beware" ==
See 99th Air Base Wing

== 100th Wings "Peace Through Strength" ==
See 100th Air Refueling Wing

=== 100th Bomb Wing ===
- Equipment: B-47s, KC-97s,
- Reassigned to: Eighth Air Force, 817th Air Division on 1 February 1956. (Attached to the 7th Air Division from 29 December 1957 to 1 April 1958).
- Redesignated as: 100th Strategic Reconnaissance Wing 25 June 1966

From April 1956 – February 1966, it performed global strategic bombardment training, and later global air refueling from August 1956 – December 1965. It deployed to Brize Norton RAF Station, England, December 1957 – April 1958. The wing moved without personnel or equipment to Davis–Monthan AFB, AZ, in June 1966 and absorbed resources of the 4080th Strategic Wing. During the next ten years, it performed global strategic reconnaissance with U-2 and drone aircraft, June 1966 – 1976, using one overseas-based squadron (99th SRS), and deployed operating locations as needed, 1972–1976, earning the P.T. Cullen Award as the reconnaissance unit that contributed most to the photo and signal intelligence efforts of SAC, 1972. The wing transferred drone operations and associated DC-130 launchers and CH-3 recoveries to TAC in mid-1976, and transferred U-2 resources to 9th Strategic Reconnaissance Wing at Beale AFB, CA, July–September 1976. Not operational, 11 August – 29 September 1976, while phasing down at Davis–Monthan AFB, it moved without personnel or equipment to Beale AFB on 30 September 1976 and absorbed resources of the 17th Bombardment Wing, Heavy.

== 301st Bomb Wing "Who Fears" ==
See 301st Air Refueling Wing

- Established on: 15 October 1947.
- Organized on: 1 August 1948.
- Discontinued on: 1 August 1948.
- Redesignated on: 1 August 1948.
- Assigned to: Fifteenth Air Force.
- At: Smoky Hill AFld, KS.
- Equipment: B-29s.
- Moved to: Barksdale AFB, LA on 7 November 1949.
- Changed equipment in: 1949 to B-29s, KB-29s.
- Reassigned to: Second Air Force on 1 April 1950.
- Reassigned to: Strategic Air Command, 4th Air Division on 10 February 1951. (Attached to the 7th Air Division from 3 December 1952 to 4 March 1953)
- Reassigned to: Second Air Force, 4th Air Division on 16 June 1952. (Attached to the 5th Air Division from 10 February to 17 April 1954).
- Changed equipment in: 1953 to B-29s, KB-29s, B-47s, KC-97s.
- Changed equipment in: 1954 to B-47s, KC-97s.
- Moved to: Lockbourne AFB, OH on 15 April 1958
- Reassigned to: Eighth Air Force, 801st Air Division on 15 April 1958.
- Changed equipment in: 1958 to B-47s, RB-47s, KC-97s.
- Changed equipment in: 1959 to B-47s, KC-97s.
- Changed equipment in: 1961 to B-47s, E-47s, KC-97s.
- Changed equipment in: 1962 to E-47s, KC-97s.
- Changed equipment in: 1963 to B-47s, E-47s, KC-97s, KC-135s.
- Changed equipment in: 1964 to B-47s, E-47s, KC-135s.
- Redesignated on: 16 June 1964 as 301st Air Refueling Wing.

Conducted strategic bombardment training, 1947–1948, and aerial gunnery training for other SAC organizations, November 1947 – January 1948. Strategic bombardment training, 1948–1964, with the 97th Bomb Wing being attached from 17 March 1948 to 16 May 1948 and the 22nd Bomb Wing being attached from 1 August 1948 to 9 May 1949, and aerial refueling 1949–. Deployed in England, December 1952 – March 1953, and in French Morocco, February–April 1954. Added electronic counter-measures (ECM) activities to its other missions in July 1958, and soon devoted most of its activity to ECM work.

== 303d Wings "Might in Flight" ==
See 303d Aeronautical Systems Wing

=== 303rd Bomb Wing ===
- Established on: 27 August 1951.
- Activated on: 4 September 1951.
- At: Davis–Monthan AFB, AZ.
- Assigned to: Fifteenth Air Force, 36th Air Division. (Attached to the 5th Air Division from 5 October to 6 November 1952). (Attached to the 7th Air Division from 4 March to 5 June 1954). (Attached to the 3rd Air Division from 4 July to 4 October 1956). (Attached to the 3rd Air Division from 5 April to 4 July 1958).
- Equipment: B-29s.
- Changed equipment in: 1952 to B-29s, KB-29s.
- Changed equipment in: 1953 to B-29s, KB-29s, B-47s, KC-97s.
- Changed equipment in: 1954 to B-47s, KC-97s.
- Changed equipment in: 1957 to B-47s
- Reassigned to: Fifteenth Air Force, 12th Air Division on 15 March 1960.
- Changed equipment in: 1960 to B-47s, KC-97s
- Reassigned to: Fifteenth Air Force, 12th Strategic Aerospace Division on 1 June 1962.
- Inactivated on: 15 June 1964.

Trained for strategic bombardment and Air refueling operations to meet SAC's global commitments. Deployed at Sidi Slimane AB, French Morocco, 5 October – 6 November 1952; Greenham Common RAF Station, England, 4 March – 28 April 1954; Fairford RAF Station, England, 28 April – 5 June 1954; and Andersen AFB, Guam, 4 July – 4 October 1956 and 5 April – 5 July 1958.

== 305th Bomb Wing ==
See 305th Air Mobility Wing

- Established on: 20 December 1950.
- Activated on: 2 January 1951.
- At: MacDill AFB, FL.
- Assigned to: Second Air Force.
- Equipment: B-29s, KC-97s.
- Reassigned to: Second Air Force, 6th Air Division on 10 February 1951. (Attached to the 7th Air Division from 4 September to 5 December 1953). (Attached to the 5th Air Division from 3 November 1955 to 8 January 1956). (Attached to the 5th Air Division from 7 January to 8 March 1957).
- Changed equipment in: 1952 to B-29s, B-47s, KC-97s.
- Changed equipment in: 1954 to B-47s, KC-97s.
- Changed equipment in: 1958 to B-47s, RB-47s, KC-97s.
- Changed equipment in: 1959 to B-47s, KC-97s, KC-135s.
- Moved to: Bunker Hill AFB, IN. on 1 June 1959.
- Reassigned to: Second Air Force, 17th Air Division on 15 July 1959.
- Changed equipment in: 1959 to B-47s, KC-97s, KC-135s.
- Changed equipment in: 1960 to B-47s, KC-135s.
- Changed equipment in: 1961 to B-58s, TB-58s, KC-135s.
- Reassigned to: Second Air Force, 19th Air Division on 1 January 1961.
- Changed equipment in: 1961 to B-47s, B-58s, TB-58s, KC-135s.
- Reassigned to: Second Air Force, 825th Strategic Aerospace Division on 1 September 1964.
- Changed equipment in: 1964 to B-58s, TB-58s, KC-135s.
- Changed equipment in: 1966 to B-58s, TB-58s, EC-135s, KC-135s.
- Redesignated as: 305th Air Refueling Wing on 1 January 1970 as

Conducted strategic bombardment training, February 1951 – February 1953. Added a refueling mission in July 1951. Converted to jet bombers in late 1952. Deployed overseas three times, once to England (September–December 1953) and twice to North Africa (November 1955 – January 1956 and January–March 1957), in keeping with its mission of global bombardment and air refueling operations. Two wing B-47s set speed records on 28 July 1953 when one flew from Goose Bay, Labrador, to Fairford RAF Station, England, in 4:14 hours and the other flew from Limestone AFB, ME, to Fairford RAF Station in 4:45 hours. Converted to jet tankers in 1959 and supersonic bombers in 1961. A wing B-58 set a new speed record on 16 October 1963 by flying from Tokyo, Japan, to London, England (via Alaska and Greenland), in 8:35 hours at an average speed of 938 mph. The wing operated a B-58 combat crew training school, August 1965 – December 1969, and gained a post-attack command control system (PACCS) mission in mid-1966. The wing from January 1970 concentrated on air refueling and PACCS support. From the early 1970s, supported worldwide task forces by deploying tankers to Europe, Alaska, Greenland, and the Pacific. Provided air-refueling support to units involved in the invasion of Grenada (October 1983). From August 1990 to June 1991 deployed personnel and aircraft to provide refueling support for air operations to and in Southwest Asia. Wing also delivered food to the Kurds in Northern Iraq, April–May 1991. Lost its PACCS mission in May 1992.

== 306th Bomb Wing "Abundance of Strength" ==
See 306th Flying Training Group

- Established on: 11 August 1948
- Activated on: 1 September 1950
- At: MacDill AFB, FL
- Assigned to: Second Air Force
- Equipment: B-29s
- Reassigned to Second Air Force, 6th Air Division on 10 February 1951 (attached to the 7th Air Division from 11 June to 4 September 1953; attached to the 5th Air Division from 5 January to 21 February 1955; attached to the 5th Air Division from 23 October 1956 to 9 January 1957; attached to the Sidi Slimane Task Force from 9 to 15 October 1957)
- Changed equipment in: 1951 to B-29s, B-47s, B-50s, KC-97s
- Changed equipment in: 1952 to B-47s, KC-97s
- Reassigned to: Eighth Air Force, 6th Air Division on 1 January 1959
- Reassigned to: Eighth Air Force, 823rd Air Division on 6 February 1961
- Moved to: McCoy AFB, FL on 1 April 1963
- Changed equipment in: 1963 to B-52Ds, KC-135As
- Reassigned to: Second Air Force, 823rd Air Division on 31 March 1970
- Reassigned to: Second Air Force, 42nd Air Division on 30 June 1971
- Inactivated on: 1 July 1974
- Reactivated and redesignated as: 306th Strategic Wing at RAF Mildenhall, UK on 1 August 1976
- Inactivated on: 1 February 1992

Provided B-29 transition training for SAC aircrews at MacDill AFB, FL, September 1950 – February 1951. Converted to B-47 bombers and KC-97 tankers during 1951. Developed combat procedures and techniques for B-47 jet bombers, 1952. From early 1953 until early 1963, maintained proficiency by constant training in strategic bombardment and aerial refueling operations. Deployed at RAF Fairford, England, June–September 1953, at Ben Guerir Air Base, French Morocco (later, Morocco), January–February 1955, October 1956 – January 1957, and October 1957, and at Hunter AFB, GA. October–December 1962. Phased down for inactivation in early 1963, but moved to McCoy AFB in Orlando, FL without personnel or equipment and was reequipped with B-52D and KC-135A aircraft and crews from the 4047th Strategic Wing. From April 1963 to the autumn of 1973, maintained combat proficiency by constant training in strategic bombardment and air refueling operations. On several occasions, furnished aircraft and personnel to SAC combat forces in the Pacific and Southeast Asia to the point of depleting all home base resources. By the autumn of 1973, lost all operating forces and began phasing down, at the same time closing McCoy AFB, FL. Inactivated in July 1974.

Reactivated in August 1976 as 306th Strategic Wing to replace 98th Strategic Wing. Not operational, 15 August – 30 September 1976, while becoming organized. Relocated to RAF Mildenhall, United Kingdom, and functioned as the focal point for all SAC operations in Europe, and as liaison between SAC and USAFE (and US European Command), 1 October 1976 – 1 July 1992. Employed KC-135, RC-135, SR-71 and U-2/TR-1 aircraft and crews on loan from U.S. based SAC wings for air refueling and reconnaissance operations. With pending inactivation of SAC in 1992 and transfer of European USAF air refueling aircraft assets to USAFE, wing inactivated and was replaced by USAFE's 100th Air Refueling Wing.

== 307th Bomb Wing ==
See 307th Bombardment Wing

- Established on: 15 August 1947
- At: MacDill AAF, FL
- Assigned to: Strategic Air Command
- Equipment: F-51s, B-29s
- Reassigned to: Fifteenth Air Force on 16 December 1948
- Changed equipment in: 1949 to B-29s
- Reassigned to: Second Air Force on 1 April 1950
- Changed equipment in: 1950 to B-29s, B-50s
- Changed equipment in: 1951 to B-29s
- Reassigned to: Second Air Force, 6th Air Division on 10 February 1951 (attached to Far East Air Forces Bomber Command (Provisional). 10 February to 11 August 1951) (attached to Far East Air Forces Bomber Command) (Provisional), ADVON, 12 August to 11 September 1951; attached to Far East Air Forces Bomber Command) (Provisional) from 12 September 1951 to 17 June 1954; attached to the Twentieth Air Force from 18 June to 25 July 1954)
- Reassigned to Fifteenth Air Force, 818th Air Division on 11 October 1954 (remained attached to the Twentieth Air Force through 19 November 1954) (Attached to the 7th Air Division from 7 July to 5 October 1956)
- Changed equipment in: 1955 to B-47s, KC-97s
- Reassigned to: Second Air Force, 818th Air Division on 1 January 1959
- Changed equipment in: 1961 to B-47s
- Changed equipment in: 1962 to B-47s, EB-47s
- Reassigned to: Second Air Force, 818th Strategic Aerospace Division on 1 March 1962
- Inactivated on: 25 March 1965
- Redesignated on: 307th Strategic Wing, January 1970
- Reassigned to: 8th Air Force, 3d Air Division, January 1970
- Reactivated on: 1 April 1970
- Inactivated on: 30 September 1975
- Reactivated under Air Force Reserve Command: 8 January 2011

Replaced the 94th Combat Bombardment Wing, VHB (Provisional), and other organizations in August 1947. From August 1947 until 12 July 1948, and from 12 July to 15 December 1948, the 307th Wing controlled in addition to its own units the 82nd Fighter Wing, from 15 August 1947 to 15 December 1948, at Grenier Field, NH. From September 1947 to July 1948, and July 1948 to August 1950, trained other SAC combat units in antisubmarine warfare. From February 1949 through August 1950, operated a B-29 transition training school for SAC units, and provided combat crew standardization training for SAC units, November 1949 – August 1950. The wing's 307th Bombardment Group deployed to Okinawa in August 1950 for combat operations under FEAF Bomber Command, Provisional. The attached 306th Bombardment Group transferred to its parent wing on 1 September 1950, and until 10 February 1951, the 307th Wing had no tactical mission. On that date, wing resources were used to man the 6th Air Division at MacDill, and the wing deployed without personnel to Kadena, where it absorbed resources of the 307th Bombardment Group and began flying combat missions. By the end of hostilities, the wing (including its tactical group) had flown 5,810 combat sorties during 573 combat missions. The wing remained in the Far East in combat ready status, and on 15 August 1953, Kadena AB, Okinawa, became its permanent base. Returned to the United States in November 1954, disposing of B-29s at Davis–Monthan AFB, AZ, en route to a new base in NE. Gained B-47 and KC-97 aircraft in 1955, and, until January 1965 when the wing began phasing down for inactivation, conducted strategic bombardment training and air refueling operations to meet SAC's global commitments.

The wing was reactivated in Thailand in April 1970, replacing the 4258th Strategic Wing. Until inactivated in September 1975, the 307th was the only regular Air Force SAC wing in Southeast Asia. Using aircraft and crews loaned from other SAC wings, the 307th provided KC-135 aerial refueling of U.S. aircraft in Southeast Asia and conducted conventional bombardment operations as directed through the Military Assistance Command, Vietnam (MACV). Ended all combat operations on 14 August 1973. The final B-52 left the wing in June 1975, but the wing continued some KC-135 Air refueling and RC-135 reconnaissance operations until inactivated in September 1975.

On 8 January 2011, the 307th Bomb Wing was reactivated at Barksdale AFB, LA as the sole B-52H bomb wing in Air Force Reserve Command (AFRC), assigned to AFRC's 10th Air Force. Operational claimancy for the 307 BW lies with SAC's successor organization, the Air Force Global Strike Command (AFGSC).

== 308th Bomb Wing "Not for Self" ==
See 308th Armament Systems Wing

- Activated on: 10 October 1951.
- At: Forbes AFB, KS.
- Assigned to: Second Air Force, 38th Air Division (Attached to the 21st Air Division from 10 October 1951 to 17 April 1952). (Attached to the 5th Air Division from 21 August to 26 October 1956).
- Equipment: B-29s.
- Moved to: Hunter AFB, GA in 1951.
- Changed equipment in: 1953 to B-29s, B-47s, KC-97s.
- Moved to: Plattsburgh AFB, NY on 15 July 1959.
- Reassigned to: Eighth Air Force, 820th Air Division on 1 July 1959.
- Changed equipment in: 1959 to B-47s, KC-97s.
- Inactivated on: 25 June 1961.

Strategic bombardment training, 1951–1959, and Air refueling, 1953–1959, to meet SAC's global commitments. Deployed to bases in North Africa three times, twice in detachment form and once (Sidi Slimane AB, Morocco, 21 August – c. 26 October 1956) as a unit. From November 1956 to March 1957, tested SAC alert plan by maintaining one-third of its bomber and tanker force on continuous alert. Not operational, July 1959 – June 1961. Organized in April 1962 as a Titan II strategic missile wing. Gained control over first missile complex in August 1962 and became fully operational with 18 sites in December 1963.

== 310th Wing ==
see 310th Bomb Wing

== 319th Bomb Wing "Defenders of Freedom" ==
See 319th Air Refueling Wing

- Redesignated on: 15 November 1962.
- Organized on: 1 February 1963..
- At: Grand Forks AFB, ND.
- Assigned to: Strategic Air Command.
- Equipment: B-52s, KC-135s.
- Reassigned to: Fifteenth Air Force, 810th Strategic Aerospace Division on 1 February 1963.
- Reassigned to: Second Air Force, 810th Strategic Aerospace Division on 1 July 1963.
- Reassigned to Second Air Force, 4th Strategic Aerospace Division on 1 September 1964.
- Reassigned to: Fifteenth Air Force, 4th Strategic Aerospace Division on 31 March 1970.
- Reassigned to: Fifteenth Air Force, 47th Air Division on 30 June 1971.
- Reassigned to: Fifteenth Air Force, 4th Air Division on 15 January 1973.
- Reassigned to: Fifteenth Air Division, 57th Air Division on 22 January 1975.
- Reassigned to: Fifteenth Air Force, 4th Air Division on 1 May 1982.
- Reassigned to: Fifteenth Air Force, 57th Air Division on 23 January 1987.
- Changed equipment in: 1987 to B-1s, KC-135s.
- Reassigned to: Eighth Air Force, 42nd Air Division on 16 June 1988.
- Reassigned to: Eighth Air Force on 9 July 1991.
- Redesignated on: 1 September 1991 as 319th Wing at Grand Forks AFB, ND.
- Reassigned to: Air Combat Command, Eighth Air Force on 31 May 1992.

Replaced 4133rd Strategic Wing in February 1963. Conducted global bombardment training and Air refueling operations to meet SAC commitments. Presented the Omaha Trophy as the outstanding wing in SAC for 1978. Participated in SAC program to test admission of females to in-flight refueling career field, January–December 1979. Converted from B-52 to B-1 bombers, 1986–1987. Flew training missions with conventional and nuclear configurations. Tanker crews assisted in Air refueling efforts during the invasion of Panama, December 1989. Deployed tankers to Oman, Egypt, and Saudi Arabia to provide Air refueling and cargo missions in Southwest Asia, August 1990 – April 1991.

== 320th Bomb Wing "Strength through Awareness" ==
See 320th Air Expeditionary Wing

- Established and activated on: 1 December 1952
- At: March AFB, CA.
- Assigned to: Fifteenth Air Force, 12th Air Division. (Attached to the 7th Air Division from 3 Ju8n to 4 September 1954). (Attached to the 3rd Air Division from 5 October 1956 to 11 January 1957).
- Equipment: B-29s, KC-97s.
- Changed equipment in: 1953 to B-47s, YRB-47s, KC-97s.
- Changed equipment in: 1954 to B-47s, KC-97s.
- Reassigned to: Department of the Air Force on 16 September 1960.
- Reassigned to: Strategic Air Command on 15 November 1962
- Moved to: Mather AFB, CA, on 1 February 1963.
- Changed equipment in: 1963 to B-52s, KC-135s
- Reassigned to: Fifteenth Air Force, 14th Strategic Aerospace Division on 1 February 1963.
- Reassigned to: Fifteenth Air Force, 18th Strategic Aerospace Division on 1 July 1965.
- Reassigned to: Fifteenth Air Force, 47th Air Division on 2 July 1966.
- Reassigned to: Fifteenth Air Force, 14th Strategic Aerospace Division on 31 March 1970.
- Reassigned to: Second Air Force, 47th Air Division on 30 June 1971.
- Reassigned to: Fifteenth Air Force, 14th Air Division on 1 October 1972.
- Changed equipment in: 1972 to B-52s, KC-135s, T-29s.
- Reassigned to: 47th Air Division on 1 October 1982
- Reassigned to: Fifteenth Air Force 15 July 1998
- Inactivated on: 30 September 1989

Replaced the 106th Bombardment Wing, (Medium) (ANG) in December 1952. Conducted global bombardment training and air refueling operations to meet SAC commitments, 1952–1960. This wing was employed for training reservist to backfill rotating B-29 combat crews serving in Korea. While the reservists were undergoing training they were paid on the lesser reserve pay scale. Trained B-47 cadre for 96th Bombardment Wing, Medium, December 1953 – January 1955. Deployed as a wing to Brize Norton RAF Station, England, 5 June – 4 September 1954, and Andersen AFB, Guam, 5 October 1956 – 11 January 1957. Replaced 4134th Strategic Wing in February 1963. Performed global bombardment training and air refueling operations to meet SAC commitments, February 1963 – 1965 and later. Entire wing drastically reduced February–July 1965, December 1965 – March 1966, and June 1972 – October 1973, when all aircraft, crews, and most support personnel loaned to other SAC units for operations in Southeast Asia. During the latter period, trained T-29 pilots for Fifteenth Air Force.

== 321st Bomb Wing "Power for Peace" ==
See 321st Air Expeditionary Wing

- Established on: 23 March 1953
- Activated on: 15 December 1953
- At: Pinecastle AFB, FL
- Assigned to: Second Air Force. (Attached to the 813th Air Division (Provisional) 11 June to 14 July 1954)
- Equipment: B-47s, KC-97s
- Reassigned to: Second Air Force, 813th Air Division on 15 July 1954 (attached to the 7th Air Division 9 December 1954 to 5 March 1955; attached to the 5th Air Division from 9 April to 3 July 1956)
- Reassigned to: Second Air Force on 1 June 1956
- Changed equipment in: 1957 to B-47s
- Home station renamed: Pinecastle AFB renamed McCoy AFB on 7 May 1958
- Reassigned to: Eighth Air Force, 6th Air Division on 1 January 1959
- Reassigned to: Eighth Air Force, 1 February 1959
- Changed equipment in: 1959 to B-47s, C-124s
- Reassigned to: Eighth Air Force, 823rd Air Division on 6 February 1961
- Inactivated on: 25 October 1961

== 330th Bomb Wing ==
See 330th Aircraft Sustainment Wing

=== 340th Bomb Wing "Anywhere Any Time" ===
See 340th Flying Training Group

- Established on: 3 October 1952.
- Activated on: 20 October 1952.
- At: Whiteman AFB, MO.
- Assigned to: Second Air Force.
- Equipment: B-47s, YRB-47s, KC-97s.
- Reassigned to: Eighth Air Force on 1 July 1955, (Attached to 7th Air Division 13 September to 3 November 1955).
- Changed equipment in: 1957 to B-47s, KC-97s.
- Reassigned to: Second Air Force on 1 January 1959.
- Reassigned to: Second Air Force, 17th Air Division on 15 July 1959.
- Changed equipment in: 1959 to B-47s, KC-97s, KC-135s.
- Reassigned to: Second Air Force, 17th Strategic Aerospace Division on 15 February 1962.
- Moved to: Bergstrom AFB, TX, on 1 September 1963.
- Reassigned to: Second Air Force, 4th Air Division on 1 September 1963, (Attached to 19th Air Division from 1 – 31 August 1964).
- Changed equipment in: 1963 to B-47s, B-52s, KC-135s.
- Changed equipment in: 1964 to B-52s, KC-135s.
- Reassigned to: Second Air Force, 19th Air Division on 1 September 1964.
- Inactivated on: 2 October 1966.

Replaced and absorbed resources of the 4224th Air Base Squadron in October 1952. Devoted to supervision of base rehabilitation and new construction until May 1954, through 340th Air Base Group. During this period, the wing headquarters, tactical and maintenance squadrons were minimum-manned "paper" units. Commenced initial tactical operations in March 1954. Phased down at Whiteman AFB, MO. in mid-1963 and moved without personnel or equipment to Bergstrom AFB, Texas, absorbing resources and mission of former 4130th Strategic Wing. Continued global strategic bombardment training and Air refueling operations until October 1966.

== 341st Bomb Wing "World Peace Through Strength" ==
See 341st Missile Wing

- Established on: 23 March 1953.
- Activated on: 1 September 1955.
- At: Abilene AFB, TX (Dyess AFB, 15 December 1956))
- Assigned to: Fifteenth Air Force.
- Equipment: B-47s, KC-97s.
- Reassigned to: Fifteenth Air Force, 819th Air Division on 1 February 1956. (Attached to the 3rd Air Division from 9 January to 4 April 1958).
- Changed equipment in: 1961 to B-47s.
- Inactivated on: 25 June 1961.

Performed strategic bombardment training operations on a global scale, January 1956 – May 1961, and Air refueling, February 1956 – May 1960. Deployed at Andersen AFB, Guam, January–April 1958. Phased down for inactivation at Dyess MB, TX, April–June 1961. Replaced 4061st Air Refueling Wing in July 1961.

== 351st Missile Wing "Sentinels of Peace" ==
See 351st Missile Wing

== 376th Bomb Wing "Liberandos" ==
See 376th Air Expeditionary Wing

- Established on: 25 May 1951.
- Activated on: 1 June 1951.
- At: Forbes AFB, KS.
- Assigned to: Strategic Air Command, 4th Air Division. (Attached to the 21st Air Division from 1 June to 10 October 1951)
- Equipment: B-29s.
- Moved to: Barksdale AFB, LA, on 10 October 1951.
- Changed equipment in: 1953 to B-29s, KC-97s.
- Changed equipment in: 1954 to B-29s, B-47s, E-47s, EB-47s, KC-97s.
- Changed equipment in: 1955 to B-47s, E-47s, EB-47s, KC-97s.
- Moved to: Lockbourne AFB, OH, on 1 December 1957.
- Reassigned to: Eighth Air Force, 801st Air Division on 3 December 1957.
- Changed equipment in: 1963 to B-47s, E-47s, EB-47s, KC-97s, KC-135.
- Changed equipment in: 1964 to B-47s, E-47s, EB-47s, KC-135.
- Changed equipment in: 1965 to B-47s, E-47s, EB-47s.
- Inactivated on: 15 March 1965.

Trained in strategic bombardment, August 1951 – February 1965, with bombardment operations sometimes overshadowed by electronic countermeasures operations, which became the wing's primary mission in September 1953. Included EB-47 post attack command and control operations, December 1962 – February 1965, and Air refueling, September 1953 – June 1964. Conducted B-52 combat operations in Southeast Asia, April–September 1970, Air refueling and electronic reconnaissance in the Western Pacific, April 1970–, and airborne radio relay operations, April–November 1970, February–June 1971, and March 1972 – c. August 1973.

== 379th Bomb Wing "Precision and Accuracy" ==
See 379th Air Expeditionary Wing

- Established on: 23 March 1953.
- Activated on: 1 November 1955.
- At: Homestead AFB, FL.
- Assigned to: Second Air Force, (Attached to the 813th Air Division from 1 November 1955 to 31 May 1956).
- Equipment: B-47s, KC-97s.
- Reassigned to: Second Air Force, 823rd Air Division on 1 June 1956, (Attached to the 5th Air Division from 6 March to 12 May 1957).
- Changed equipment in: 1956 to B-47s.
- Reassigned to: Eighth Air Force, 823rd Air Division on 1 January 1959.
- Moved to: Wurtsmith AFB, MI, on 9 January 1961.
- Reassigned to: Second Air Force, 40th Air Division on 9 January 1961.
- Changed equipment in: 1961 to B-52s, KC-135s.
- Reassigned to: Eighth Air Force, 40th Air Division on 1 January 1975.
- Reassigned to: Eighth Air Force on 8 June 1988
- Redesignated on: 1 September 1991 as 379th Wing.

Reassigned to: Air Combat Command, Eighth Air Force on 31 May 1992.

Replaced 4276th Air Base Squadron at Homestead AFB. Fl., in November 1955 and spent next few months becoming organized and manned. Received tactical aircraft in April 1956 and commenced training for Air refueling and strategic bombardment operations. Deployed at Sidi Slimane AB, Morocco, May–May 1957. Transferred B-47s beginning October 1960 and moved to Wurtsmith AFB, Mich., without equipment in January 1961. Reequipped with KC-135 and B-52 aircraft, conducted Air refueling operations since January 1961 and strategic bombardment training since May 1961. Replaced the 4038th Strategic Wing in 1963. Supported combat operations in Southeast Asia with KC-135 aircraft and crews and B-52 crews, 1965–1975.

== 380th Bomb Wing "Strength and Confidence" ==
See 380th Air Expeditionary Wing

== 384th Bomb Wing "Keep the Show on the Road" ==
See 384th Air Expeditionary Wing

- Established on: 23 March 1953.
- Activated on: 1 August 1955.
- At: Little Rock AFB, AR.
- Assigned to: Second Air Force, 825th Air Division, (Attached to the 7th Air Division 3 January to 5 April 1957).
- Equipment: B-47s.
- Changed equipment in: 1961 to B-47s, KC-97s.
- Reassigned to: Second Air Force, 825th Strategic Aerospace Division on 1 June 1962.
- Inactivated on: 1 September 1964.
- Reactivated on: 1 July 1987.
- At: McConnell AFB, KS.
- Assigned to: Eighth Air Force, 19th Air Division.
- Reassigned to: Eighth Air Force on 13 June 1988.
- Reassigned to: Fifteenth Air Force on 1 July 1989.
- Equipment: B-1s.
- Redesignated on: 1 September 1991 as 384th Wing.
- Reassigned to: Eighth Air Force on 1 September 1992.
- Reassigned to: Air Combat Command, Eighth Air Force on 31 May 1992.

Poorly manned and without aircraft in 1955. Trained to maintain proficiency in strategic bombing, February 1956 – July 1964, and in air refueling August 1961 – October 1963 and April–August 1964. Deployed at RAF Station Brize Norton, England, 3 January – 5 April 1957. Operate out of McConnell AFB, KS. From December 1972. Deployed KC-135 aircraft and crews on a worldwide basis, engaging in actual and simulated tactical and strategic operations, including air refueling support for the evacuation of South Vietnamese in 1975. Maintained proficiency in air refueling in support of SAC units and other units as directed.

== 390th Bomb Wing "Not for Ourselves Alone" ==
- Established on: 23 March 1953.
- At: Davis–Monthan AFB, AZ.
- Assigned to:
- Equipment:
- Redesignated on: 1 November 1961 as 390th Strategic Missile Wing.

== 397th Bomb Wing "Guardian of Freedom" ==
- Established and activated on: 15 November 1962.
- Organized on: 1 February 1963.
- At: Dow AFB, ME.
- Assigned to: Strategic Air Command
- Equipment: B-52s, KC-97s.
- Changed equipment in: 1964 to B-52s, KC-97s, KC-135s.
- Changed equipment in: 1965 to B-52s, KC-135s.
- Reassigned to: Eighth Air Force, 6th Air Division on 1 February 1963.
- Reassigned to: Eighth Air Force, 45th Air Division on 2 July 1966.
- Inactivated on 25 April 1968.

== 410th Bomb Wing ==
See 410th Air Expeditionary Wing

== 416th Bomb Wing ==
See 416th Air Expeditionary Group

== 449th Bomb Wing "Never Unprepared" ==
•Established on: 15 November 1962. •At: Kincheloe AFB, MI. •Assigned to: Strategic Air Command. •Equipment: B-52s, KC-135s. •Reassigned to: Second Air Force, •40th Air Division on 1 February 1963. •Inactivated on: 30 September 1977. Replaced the 4239th Strategic Wing and assumed a mission of training for strategic bombardment on 1 February 1963. Added air refueling to mission in July 1963. Supported SAC combat operations in Southeast Asia by furnishing KC-135 aircraft and crews, November 1965 – December 1975 and B-52 crews May 1968 – June 1975. Responsible for phasing down Kincheloe AFB, MI. for closure July–September 1977.

== 450th Bomb Wing ==
•Activated on: 15 November 1962. •Organized on: 1 February 1963. •At: Minot AFB, ND. •Assigned to: Strategic Air Command. •Equipment: B-52s, KC-135s. •Reassigned to: Second Air Force, 810th Strategic Aerospace Division on 1 February 1963. •Reassigned to: Fifteenth Air Force, 810th Strategic Aerospace Division on 2 July 1966. •Changed equipment in: 1967 to B-52s, EC-135s, KC-135s. •Inactivated on: 25 July 1968.

Replaced 4136th Strategic Wing in February 1963. Trained in global bombardment and Air Refueling operations. Added post attack command and control system (PACCS)/ airborne launch control system (ALCS) missions in 1967 and began active PACCS/ALCS missions in February 1968. Supported SAC combat operations in Southeast Asia by furnishing KC-135 aircraft and crews, December 1964 – July 1968, and B-52 crews, June–July 1968. Replaced by 5th Bombardment Wing, Heavy, in July 1968.

== 454th Bomb Wing "Deter or Destroy" ==
•Activated on: 15 November 1962. •At: Columbus AFB, MS. •Assigned to: Strategic Air Command. •Equipment: B-52s, KC-135s. •Reassigned to: Second Air Force, 4th Air Division on 1 February 1963. •Reassigned to: Second Air Force, 42nd Air Division on 1 July 1963. •Inactivated on: 2 July 1969. Replaced the 4228th Strategic Wing in February 1963. Conducted air refueling operations and trained in bombardment operations. The wing's headquarters staff, tactical aircraft and crews, and maintenance personnel integrated into SAC combat forces in the Pacific and Southeast Asia, 16 November 1965 – 31 March 1966; 27 June – c. 23 December 1967, and c. 28 June – c. 20 December 1968. During these periods, the 454th Combat Support Group continued to operate Columbus AFB, Miss. Began phasing down for inactivation in May 1969 and ceased flying 2 days before inactivation.

== 456th Bomb Wing ==
See 456th Bombardment Wing

== 461st Bomb Wing ==
•Activated on: 15 November 1962. •Organized on: 1 February 1963. •At: Amarillo AFB, TX. •Assigned to: Strategic Air Command. •Equipment: B-52s, KC-135s. •Reassigned to: Fifteenth Air Force, 22nd Strategic Aerospace Division on 1 February 1963. •Reassigned to: Fifteenth Air Force, 819th Strategic Aerospace Division on 1 July 1964. •Reassigned to: Second Air Force on 1 July 1965. •Reassigned to: Second Air Force, 19th Air Division on 2 July 1966. •Changed equipment in: 1966 to B-52s. •Inactivated on: 25 March 1968.

Activated at Amarillo AFB, Texas, in 1963, the 461st absorbed the personnel and equipment of the inactivating 4128th Strategic Wing. Trained with B-52s to-maintain heavy bombardment proficiency, and participated in numerous-operational readiness inspections and actual and simulated exercises as directed by the Strategic Air Command. Deployed B-52 aircraft and crews to Andersen AFB, Guam, 18 January – 4 July 1967, for combat operations in Southeast Asia. Maintained combat proficiency until 21 January 1968 when last B-52 transferred. Inactivated on 25 March.

== 465th Bomb Wing "Checkmate to Aggression" ==
•Redesignated and activated on: 15 November 1962. •Organized on: 1 February 1963. •At: Robins AFB, GA. •Assigned to: Strategic Air Command. •Equipment: B-52s, KC-135s. •Reassigned to: Eighth Air Force, 822nd Air Division on 1 February 1963. (Attached to the 57th Air Division from 10 August to 1 September 1966). •Reassigned to: Eighth Air Force, 57th Air Division on 2 September 1966. •Inactivated on: 25 July 1968.

Activated as a bombardment wing in February 1963, the 465th replaced the 4137th Strategic Wing at Robins AFB, GA Conducted strategic bombardment training and Air Refueling operations, February 1963 – July 1968. Replaced by 19th Bombardment Wing, Heavy, in July 1968.

== 484th Bomb Wing ==
See 484th Air Expeditionary Wing

== 509th Wings "Defender Avenger" ==
see 509th Bomb Wing
