= 309th Air Division =

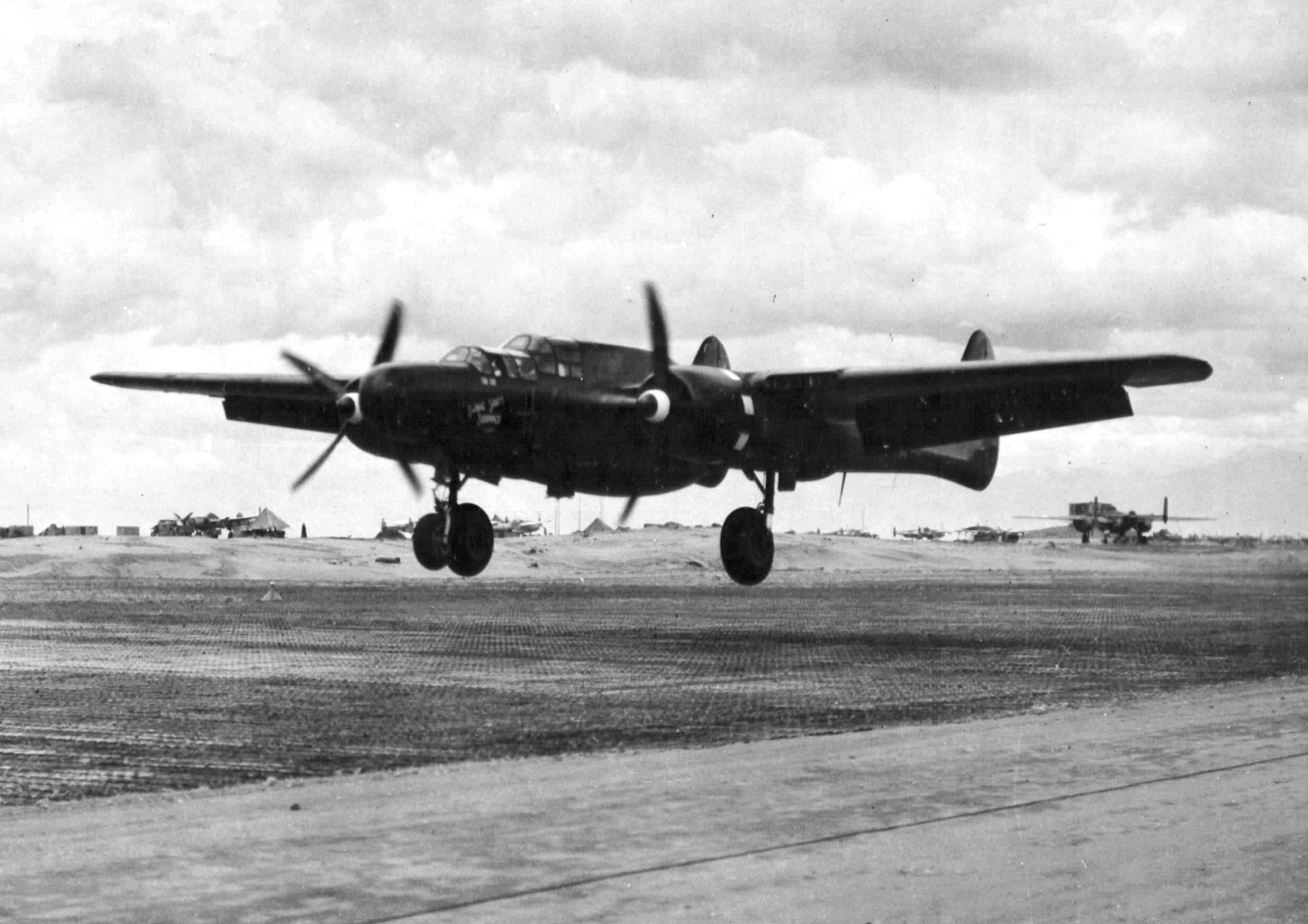
- P-61 Black Widow of the 547th Night Fighter Squadron
- Active: 1944–1946; 1947–1949
- Country: United States
- Branch: United States Air Force
- Role: Command of tactical aircraft
- Engagements: Southwest Pacific Theater
- Decorations: Philippine Presidential Unit Citation

Commanders
- Notable commanders: Paul Wurtsmith; St Clair Streett; Neel E. Kearby

The 309th Air Division is an inactive United States Air Force organization. Its last assignment was with Continental Air Command, assigned to Twelfth Air Force at Hensley Field, Texas. It was inactivated on 27 June 1949.

The division was first activated in 1944 in New Guinea during World War II as the 309th Bombardment Wing. The wing acted as a task force headquarters controlling forward based units of Fifth Air Force in New Guinea and during the Liberation of the Philippines. Following the war, it moved to Japan and served as part of the occupation forces until inactivating in March 1946. It was activated again nine months later in the Air Force Reserve.

== History ==
=== World War II ===
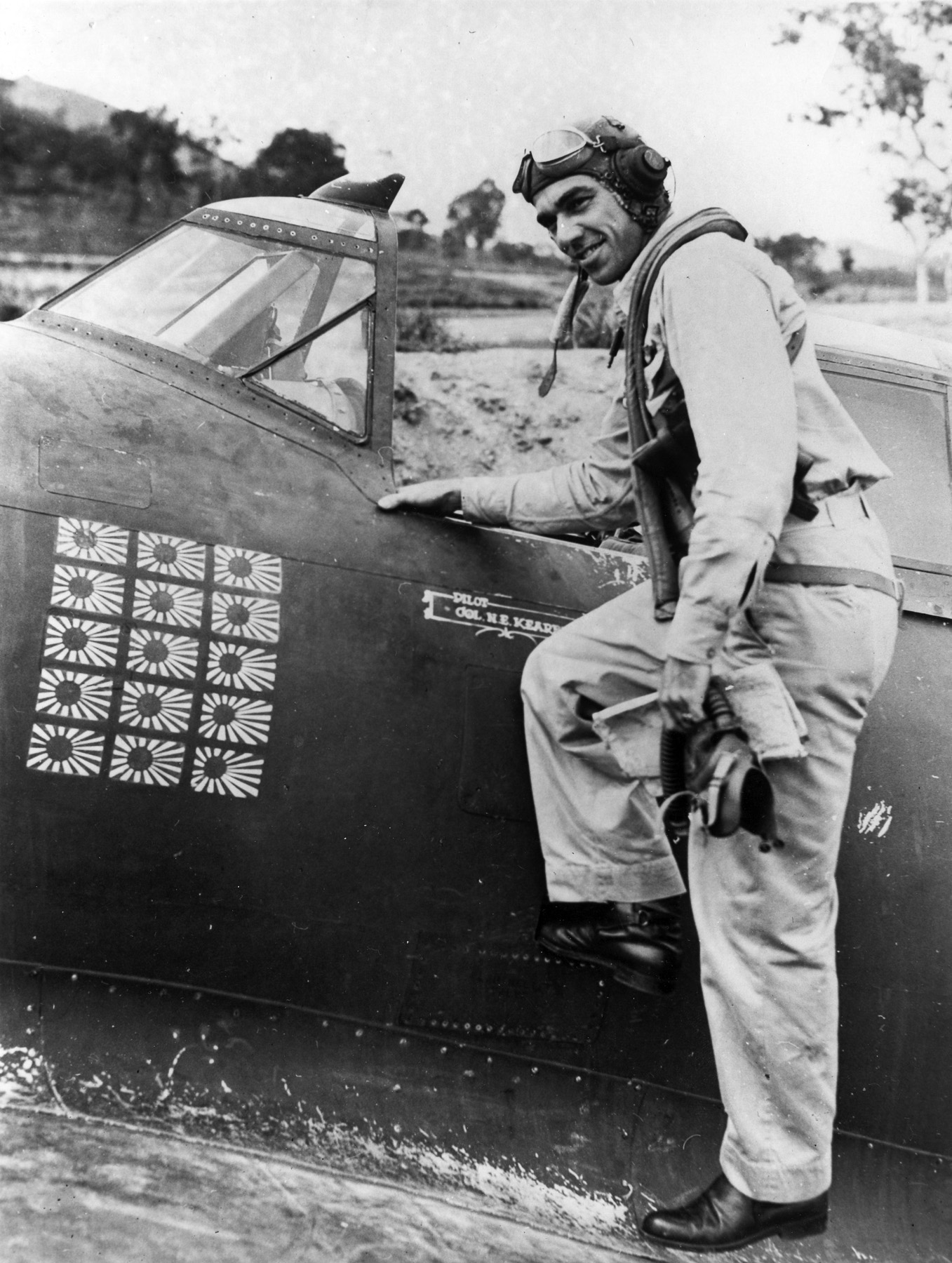
Neel E Kearby with his P-47 marked with 15 enemy aircraft destroyed

The division was first activated in February 1944 at Lae Airfield, New Guinea as the 309th Bombardment Wing and assigned to Fifth Air Force. Although called a bombardment wing, the 309th operated as a task force, commanding the forward elements of Fifth Air Force. The 309th replaced the provisional 2d Air Task Force, which was organized on 2 August 1943 to serve as the forward element of the Advanced Echelon of Fifth Air Force in the Tsili Tsili area of New Guinea. The wing's combat components included bomber, fighter, reconnaissance and special operations groups and their supporting organizations.

The wing's bomber and fighter units attacked shipping, coastal installations, storage buildings, gun positions and airfields. When possible, Japanese troop concentrations were also attacked. Its tactical reconnaissance units flew numerous photographic missions. In July, the wing moved forward to the Schouten Islands, initially occupying Kornasoren Airfield, which aviation engineers rebuilt as a heavy bomber base after its capture from the Japanese. The 309th began operations supporting the Liberation of the Philippines in November.

In late January 1945, American forces landing on Luzon seized San Marcelino Airfield, and the wing installed the 348th Fighter Group and elements of the 421st Night Fighter Squadron and 3d Emergency Rescue Squadron there, moving its headquarters to the base on 8 February. Starting in the spring of 1945, the wing's units concentrated on providing air support for XI Corps. Operations included providing support to guerilla forces engaged behind Japanese lines. The 309th remained in the Philippines for the rest of the war.

Fifth Air Force began to engage in the bombing of Japanese bases on Formosa as the Philippine Campaign progressed to cut enemy supply lines from the north. Wing North American B-25 Mitchells struck these targets while its fighters escorted bombers on these missions.

Following VJ Day, the 309th moved to Japan, where its personnel systematically destroyed Japanese military aircraft and equipment for which the United States had no use. it supported aircraft that staged through Chitose Airfield on their return to the United States. It also flew surveillance flights with North American P-51 Mustangs over northern Honshū and Hokkaido. The wing was inactivated in Japan in late March 1946.

=== Air Force reserve ===
The wing was reactivated as a reserve unit under Air Defense Command (ADC) in January 1947 at Hensley Field, Texas. It was assigned no groups until October, when the 455th Bombardment Group at Hensley was assigned to the wing. At the end of March 1948, the 446th Bombardment Group was activated at Carswell Air Force Base and assigned to the wing. The groups were designated as very heavy units and were nominally Boeing B-29 Superfortress units. However, there is no indication that the 455th Group was equipped with tactical aircraft. The 446th Group was located at a regular Air Force base, which gave it access to aircraft stationed there.

In 1948, Continental Air Command assumed responsibility from ADC for managing Air National Guard and reserve units. When the regular Air Force implemented the wing base organization system, which placed operational and support units on a base under a single wing that same year, the 309th Wing, along with other reserve wings with combat groups on multiple bases, was renamed an air division.

The 309th participated in routine reserve training and supervised the training of its assigned groups with the assistance of the 2596th Air Force Reserve Training Center until it was inactivated, in part due to President Truman’s 1949 defense budget, which required reductions in the number of units in the Air Force. With the inactivation of the division and the 455th Group, most of their personnel were transferred to the 443d Troop Carrier Wing, which was simultaneously activated at Hensley.

== Lineage ==
- Established as the 309 Bombardment Wing, Heavy on 20 January 1944

Activated on 1 February 1944
Inactivated on 25 March 1946

- Redesignated 309 Bombardment Wing, Very Heavy on 6 January 1947

Activated in the Reserve on 10 January 1947
Redesignated 309 Air Division, Bombardment on 16 April 1948
Inactivated on 27 June 1949

=== Assignments ===
- Fifth Air Force, 1 February 1944 – 25 March 1946
- Tenth Air Force, 10 January 1947
- Fourteenth Air Force, 1 July 1948
- Twelfth Air Force, 12 January – 27 June 1949

=== Stations ===
- Lae Airfield, New Guinea, 1 February 1944
- Kornasoren Airfield, Noemfoor, Schouten Islands, New Guinea, 28 July 1944
- Owi Airfield, Schouten Islands, New Guinea, 9 November 1944
- San Marcelino Airfield, Luzon, Philippines, 8 February 1945
- Lingayen Airfield, Luzon, Philippines, c. 29 May 1945
- Chitose Airfield, Japan, 12 October 1945 – 25 March 1946
- Hensley Field, Texas, 10 January 1947 – 27 June 1949

=== Components ===
World War II Groups

- 3d Air Commando Group: attached 29 May – c. 8 August 1945 and c. 27 October 1945 – 25 March 1946
- 35th Fighter Group: 1 August – September 1944
- 38th Bombardment Group: 29 May – 25 September 1945
- 49th Fighter Group: 29 May – 25 September 1945
- 58th Fighter Group: 25 August 1944 – 1 January 1945
- 71st Tactical Reconnaissance Group: 29 May – 25 September 1945
- 345th Bombardment Group: c. 8 February – 25 September 1945
- 348th Fighter Group: c. 25 August – 7 November 1944; 8 February – 25 September 1945
- 417th Bombardment Group: c. 25 August – 6 December 1944
- 475th Fighter Group: 29 May – 23 September 1945

World War II Squadrons

- 26th Photographic Reconnaissance Squadron: 29 May – c. 25 September 1945
- 547th Night Fighter Squadron: 29 May – c. 25 September 1945
- 868th Bombardment Squadron: c. 25 Aug – c. 15 September 1944

Reserve Groups

- 446th Bombardment Group: 26 March 1948 – 27 June 1949
- 455th Bombardment Group: 17 October 1947 – 27 June 1949

=== Aircraft ===
- Douglas A-20 Havoc, 1944
- Consolidated B-24 Liberator, 1944
- North American B-25 Mitchell, 1944–1945
- Republic P-47 Thunderbolt, 1944
- Douglas C-47 Skytrain, 1945
- Lockheed F-5 Lightning, 1945
- Lockheed P-38 Lighting, 1945
- North American F-6 Mustang, 1945
- North American P-51 Mustang, 1945
- Northrop P-61 Black Widow, 1945

=== Commanders ===
- Brig Gen Paul Wurtsmith, 1 February 1944
- Col Neel E. Kearby, 26 February 1944
- Maj Gen St Clair Streett, 3 March 1944
- Lt Col Robert R. Rowland, 5 April 1944
- Col Jack W. Saunders, 13 May 1944
- Col Norman D. Sillin, 16 December 1944
- Col Herbert L. Grills, 20 October 1945 – 25 March 1946 (Note: The commander(s) for the period the unit was active in the reserves are not known. AFHRA Factsheet, 309 Air Division.)

=== Awards and campaigns ===
Award streamer	Award	Dates	Notes
	Philippine Republic Presidential Unit Citation	8 February 1945 – 4 July 1945	309th Bombardment Wing

Campaign Streamer	Campaign	Dates	Notes
	New Guinea	1 February 1944 – 31 December 1944	309th Bombardment Wing
	Luzon	15 December 1944 – 4 July 1945	309th Bombardment Wing
	World War II Army of Occupation (Japan)	3 September 1945 – 25 March 1946	309th Bombardment Wing

== See also ==
- B-24 Liberator units of the United States Army Air Forces
- List of Douglas A-20 Havoc operators
- List of Douglas C-47 Skytrain operators
- List of Lockheed P-38 Lightning operators
- List of United States Air Force air divisions
