= William D. Dunham =

American flying ace (1920–1990)

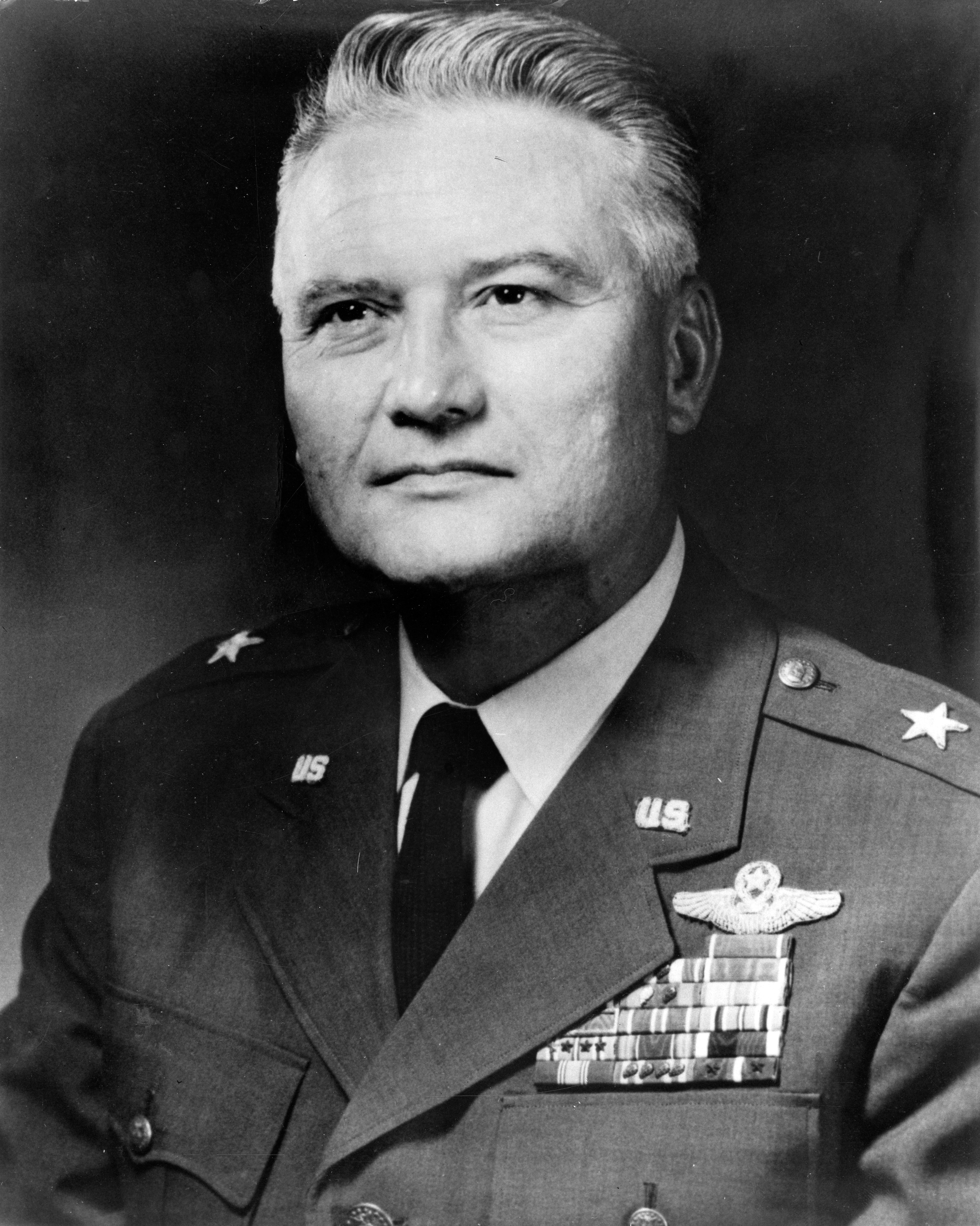
- Born: January 29, 1920; Tacoma, Washington, U.S.
- Died: March 3, 1990 (aged 70); Issaquah, Washington, U.S.
- Burial place: Sunset Hills Memorial Park, Bellevue, Washington, U.S.
- Military career
- Allegiance: United States
- Branch: United States Army Air Forces; United States Air Force
- Service years: 1941–1970
- Rank: Brigadier general
- Nickname: Dinghy
- Service number: 0-432289
- Unit: 348th Fighter Group
- Commands: 342nd Fighter Squadron; 460th Fighter Squadron; Squadron B, 464th Army Air Force Base Unit; 62nd Fighter Squadron; 56th Maintenance and Supply Group; 31st Strategic Fighter Wing; 12th Strategic Fighter Wing; 479th Tactical Fighter Wing; 831st Air Division; Third Air Force
- Conflicts: World War II; Vietnam War
- Awards: Distinguished Service Cross; Silver Star (2); Legion of Merit (3); Distinguished Flying Cross (4); Air Medal (7)

William Douglas Dunham (January 29, 1920 – March 3, 1990) was an American flying ace in the 348th Fighter Group during World War II, scoring 16 aerial victories. He retired from the United States Air Force in 1970 at the rank of brigadier general.

== Early life ==
Dunham was born in Tacoma, Washington in 1920. After graduating from Nezperce High School in Nezperce, Idaho, he attended the University of Idaho from 1937 to 1940.

== World War II ==
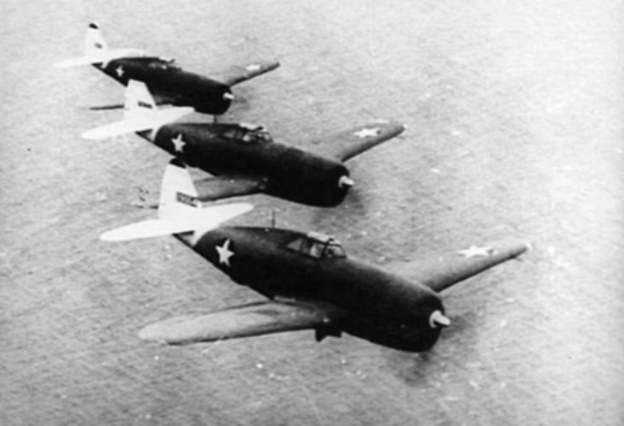
348th FG P-47s over New Guinea

After attending U.S. Army Air Corps Primary and Basic Flying schools, he graduated from Advanced Flying School at Luke Field in Arizona. He received his pilot's wings and commission as a second lieutenant on December 12, 1941, just five days after the Japanese attack on Pearl Harbor.

Dunham was assigned as a pilot with the 53d Fighter Group from December 1941 to September 1942 at Tallahassee, Florida, and later Howard Field in Panama Canal Zone, where he flew the P-39 Airacobras. He next served as a test pilot with the I Fighter Command in New York until November 1942 and as a pilot with the 342nd Fighter Squadron at Bradley Field in Connecticut, through December 1942.

In January 1943, Dunham deployed with the 342nd Fighter Squadron of the 348th Fighter Group in Australia and New Guinea. Flying the P-47 Thunderbolts, he scored his first aerial victory when he shot down a Kawasaki Ki-61 "Tony" on October 11, 1943, east of Boram, New Guinea. On October 16, he shot down two Mitsubishi A6M Zeroes off the coast of Malang, and on October 19, he shot down a Mitsubishi F1M "Pete" floatplane east of Wewak, New Guinea. He finally became a flying ace on December 21, 1943, during an aerial patrol over Arawe, where he shot down three Aichi D3A "Val" dive bombers. He finished his operational tour, opting to take 90 days of shore leave, and returned to the 348th Fighter Group for a second tour in March 1944.

On March 5, 1944, Dunham shot down a Mitsubishi G3M "Nell" bomber, his eighth aerial victory. On the same day, Dunham, Major Samuel Blair, and Colonel Neel Kearby took off on a combat patrol to intercept Japanese aircraft. They spotted enemy aircraft over Wewak and intercepted three Kawasaki Ki-48 "Lilly" of the 208th Sentai approaching Dagua Airfield. Kearby opened fire on one aircraft but did not observe it go down and made a complete circle to attack it again. While performing this maneuver, Kearby was shot down by a Nakajima Ki-43 "Oscar" and Dunham quickly shot down the Ki-43. Kearby's P-47 crashed into the jungle below. Afterward, Dunham and Blair unsuccessfully searched for Kearby until they ran short on fuel and returned to Saidor Airfield.

In late May 1944, he was appointed as commander of the 342nd FS after its previous commander, Major William M. Banks, returned to the United States. In July 1944, he was made commander of the newly created 460th Fighter Squadron, which became the fourth squadron of the 348th FG, and on September 20, he was promoted to the rank of major. On November 18, he became a double ace when he shot down a Zero over Camotes Island. During this time, the 348th FG was conducting long-range fighter sweeps and escort missions on the lead-up to the Philippines campaign. On December 7, 1944, the 348th FG and other fighter units of the V Fighter Command were providing aerial cover for the Allied landings at Ormoc Bay. During an aerial battle, Dunham shot down two Zeroes and two Oscars. A pilot of one of the Oscars shot down by Dunham bailed out of his stricken aircraft. Dunham did not shoot at the parachuting Japanese pilot, and after the pilot landed on the water, Dunham flew low and tossed a life jacket to the pilot. On that day, the pilots of the V Fighter Command shot down 50 enemy aircraft. For his heroism in the mission, Dunham received the Distinguished Service Cross.

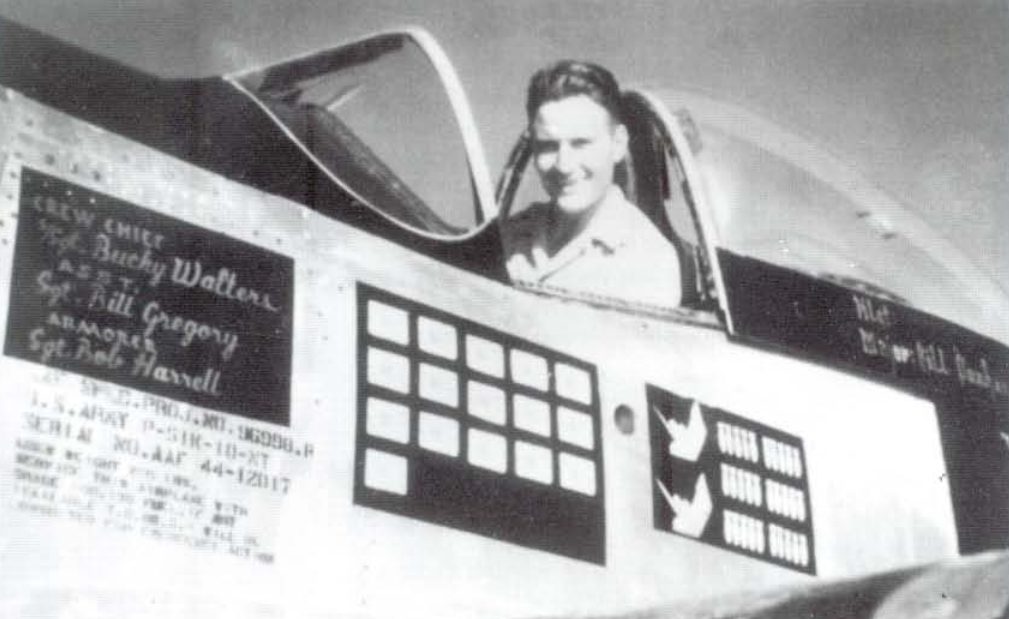
Dunham onboard his P-51K Mustang

On December 14, he shot down a Mitsubishi Ki-21 "Sally" bomber during an early-morning fighter sweep. On December 18, he was assigned as assistant operations officer at the headquarters of the 348th Fighter Group. In early 1945, he returned to the United States to attend gunnery school for P-51 Mustang pilots. In May 1945, he rejoined 348th FG as an operations officer, and the unit moved to an airfield at Ie Shima in Okinawa, where the unit was equipped with the P-51 Mustangs on July 9. On August 1, Dunham shot down a Nakajima Ki-84 "Frank" over Kyushu, during a long-range fighter mission over the Japanese Home Islands, his 16th and last aerial victory of the war.

During World War II, Dunham was credited with destroying 16 enemy aircraft in aerial combat. While serving with the 348th FG, his P-47s and P-51s were named after his wife, bearing the names "Bonnie" and "Mrs. Bonnie".

== United States Air Force career ==
In January 1946, following World War II, he was assigned as commander of Squadron B, 464th Army Air Force Base Unit at McChord Field in Washington, the position he held from February 1946 to May 1946. From May 1946 to June 1948, Dunham was assigned to Selfridge Field in Michigan, as operations officer of the 56th Fighter Group, commander of the 62nd Fighter Squadron, assistant chief of supplies, and later commander of the 56th Maintenance and Supply Group.

Dunham was assigned in August 1948 as chief of the Fighter Unit Training Section of the Operations Division at the headquarters of the Strategic Air Command (SAC), at Andrews Air Force Base in Maryland, and later at Offutt Air Force Base in Nebraska. He next served as deputy chief and later chief of the Fighter Division and Directorate of Operations at SAC's headquarters.

He departed from SAC in June 1951 to successively serve at Turner Air Force Base in Georgia as commander of the rear echelon, director of operations and deputy commander of the 31st Strategic Fighter Wing, and director of operations at the headquarters of the 40th Air Division. In April 1954, he was assigned as director of operations of the 407th Strategic Fighter Wing at Great Falls Air Force Base in Montana and later at the Far East Air Forces until March 1955.

His next assignment was as deputy commander of the 71st Strategic Reconnaissance Wing at Larson Air Force Base in Washington from March 1955 until June 1956. His next two years were spent at Bergstrom Air Force Base in Texas, as commander of the 12th Strategic Fighter Wing (redesignated as 12th Fighter Day Wing) and as deputy commander of the 27th Fighter Bomber Wing.

From July 1958 until August 1961, he served in England as director of operations of the 81st Tactical Fighter Wing. Returning to the United States, Dunham spent the next year as commander of the 479th Tactical Fighter Wing at George Air Force Base in California. This was followed in July 1962 by assignment as commander of the 831st Air Division at George AFB. He was assigned to Headquarters of the Twelfth Air Force as deputy for operations in July 1963, and in the following month, he was promoted to brigadier general.

In August 1966, General Dunham was assigned as deputy chief of staff for operations for the Seventh Air Force in South Vietnam during the early stages of the Vietnam War. His final position was as vice commander of the Third Air Force in the U.S. Air Forces in Europe before his retirement in June 1970.

== Later life ==
Dunham died on March 3, 1990, at 70, of lung cancer. He is buried at the Sunset Hills Memorial Park in Bellevue, Washington.

== Aerial victory credits ==
Date	Total	Aircraft Types Claimed	Aircraft flown
11 October 1943	1	Kawasaki Ki-61 "Tony" destroyed	P-47
16 October 1943	2	Mitsubishi A6M "Zero" destroyed	P-47
19 October 1943	1	Mitsubishi F1M "Pete" destroyed	P-47
21 December 1943	3	3 x Aichi D3A "Val" destroyed	P-47
5 March 1944	2	1 x Mitsubishi G3M "Nell", 1 x Nakajima Ki-43 "Oscar" destroyed	P-47
18 November 1944	1	1 x Mitsubishi A6M "Zero" destroyed	P-47
7 December 1944	4	2 x Mitsubishi A6M "Zero", 2 x Nakajima Ki-43 "Oscar" destroyed	P-47
14 December 1944	1	1 x Mitsubishi Ki-21 "Sally" destroyed	P-47
1 August 1945	1	1 x Nakajima Ki-84 "Frank" destroyed	P-51
	16		

== Awards and decorations ==
During his lengthy career, Dunham earned many decorations, including:

US Air Force Command Pilot Badge
Distinguished Service Cross
Silver Star with bronze oak leaf cluster	Legion of Merit with two bronze oak leaf clusters	Distinguished Flying Cross with three bronze oak leaf clusters
Air Medal with silver and bronze oak leaf clusters	Air Force Commendation Medal	Air Force Presidential Unit Citation
Air Force Outstanding Unit Award	American Defense Service Medal	American Campaign Medal
Asiatic–Pacific Campaign Medal with one silver and three bronze campaign stars	World War II Victory Medal	Army of Occupation Medal with 'Japan' clasp
National Defense Service Medal with service star	Vietnam Service Medal with bronze campaign star	Air Force Longevity Service Award with silver and bronze oak leaf clusters
Philippine Liberation Medal with two service stars	Republic of Vietnam Gallantry Cross Unit Citation	Vietnam Campaign Medal

=== Distinguished Service Cross citation ===

Dunham, William D.
Major (Air Corps), U.S. Army Air Forces
460th Fighter Squadron, 348th Fighter Group, 5th Air Force
Date of Action: December 7, 1944

Citation:

The President of the United States of America, authorized by Act of Congress July 9, 1918, takes pleasure in presenting the Distinguished Service Cross to Major (Air Corps) William Douglas Dunham, United States Army Air Forces, for extraordinary heroism in connection with military operations against an armed enemy while serving as Pilot of a P-47 Fighter Airplane in the 460th Fighter Squadron, 348th Fighter Group, Fifth Air Force, in action near San Isidro Bay, Philippine Islands, on December 7, 1944. Major Dunham was lead pilot of a flight of nine fighter planes whose mission was to engage, disperse and destroy aerial cover provided by the enemy for their shipping convoy lying in San Isidro Bay. While en route to the objective at 18,000 feet, he sighted a formation of nine enemy fighters coming in from the northern end of Cebu, and immediately ordered an attack. Followed by his squadron he closed on the enemy in a diving turn and destroyed the lead plane. Observing an enemy fighter attacking one of his comrades from a position of temporary advantage he dived after it and shot it down. During this action his squadron destroyed five additional enemy aircraft, after which the remaining enemy fled. Major Dunham then proceeded toward the squadron's rendezvous point over San Isidro Bay, and enroute there to was joined by another plane which flew wing position for him. As these two planes circled over the bay, Major Dunham observed four more enemy fighters about two thousand feet above them. He directed his wingman to accompany him in attack, closed on the enemy in a climbing turn, and with a short burst destroyed his third enemy plane. He then flew to a point directly astern another enemy plane, pursued it through a maneuver, and brought it down in flames. The wingman meanwhile destroyed one enemy plane, while the other fled and escaped. Major Dunham's extraordinary flying skill, gallant leadership and heroism made it possible for our bombers to attack enemy shipping in San Isidro Bay unhampered by enemy fighter interception. Major Dunham's unquestionable valor in aerial combat is in keeping with the highest traditions of the military service and reflects great credit upon himself, the Fifth Air Force, and the United States Army Air Forces.
