= Harold Hairston (baseball) =

American baseball player

- Pitcher
- Born: April 6, 1922; Raleigh, West Virginia, U.S.
- Died: August 25, 1998 (aged 76); Cleveland, Ohio, U.S.
- Batted: Right Threw: Right

Negro league baseball debut
- 1946, for the Homestead Grays

Last appearance
- 1947, for the Homestead Grays
- Stats at Baseball Reference

Teams
- Homestead Grays (1946–1947)

Harold Hairston (April 6, 1922 – August 25, 1998) was an American Negro league pitcher in the 1940s.

A native of Raleigh, West Virginia, Hairston served in the United States Army Air Forces during World War II. He made his Negro leagues debut in 1946 with the Homestead Grays, and played with the Grays again the following season. Hairston died in Cleveland, Ohio in 1998 at age 76.
