= Walter G. Benz Jr. =

American flying ace (1919–2010)

Walter Gottlieb Benz Jr.
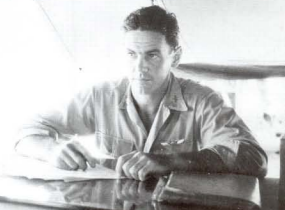
- Benz in 1944
- Born: December 27, 1919; St Louis, Missouri, U.S.
- Died: March 21, 2010 (aged 90); San Antonio, Texas, U.S.
- Burial place: Fort Sam Houston National Cemetery
- Military career
- Allegiance: United States
- Branch: United States Army Air Forces; United States Air Force
- Service years: 1941–1970
- Rank: Colonel
- Nickname: Jim
- Units: 348th Fighter Group; 8th Fighter-Bomber Group
- Commands: 342nd Fighter Squadron; 348th Fighter Group; 8th Fighter-Bomber Group
- Conflicts: World War II; Korean War
- Awards: Silver Star (2); Legion of Merit; Distinguished Flying Cross (3); Air Medal

Walter Gottlieb Benz Jr. (December 27, 1919 – March 21, 2010) was an American flying ace in the 348th Fighter Group during World War II.

== Early life ==
Benz was born on December 27, 1919, in St Louis, Missouri.

== Military career ==
On 26 September 1941, he joined the United States Army Reserves. After enlisting into the pilot training of the United States Army Air Corps on the same year, he graduated and earned his pilot wings at Ellington Field in Texas, on April 29, 1942.

=== World War II ===
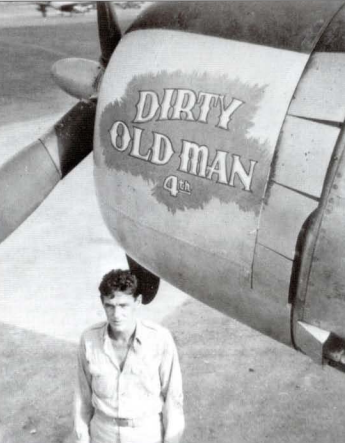
Benz with his P-47D Thunderbolt

After the completing transition training for the Republic P-47 Thunderbolt, Benz was assigned to the 342nd Fighter Squadron of the 348th Fighter Group soon after the group's formation on September 30, 1942, at Mitchel Field, New York. The 348th Fighter Group, which was equipped with the P-47 Thunderbolts, was assigned to the Asiatic-Pacific Theater in June 1943. In late July 1943, the 348th FG arrived in New Guinea via Australia.

Engaging in aerial combat within days of arrival, Benz scored his first aerial victory on September 22, 1943, when he shot down a Mitsubishi Ki-46 'Dinah' reconnaissance aircraft that was conducting a late-morning reconnaissance over Finschhafen. On 22 October and on November 15, he shot down a Kawasaki Ki-61 'Tony' and Mitsubishi ABM3-32 'Hamp' respectively during escort missions for B-24 and B-25 bombers. On 26 December, more than 100 aircraft of the V Fighter Command, among them 348th FG, were tasked in supporting the Allied landing at Cape Gloucester and protecting the Allied convoy at the beachhead. On that day, Benz shot down a Mitsubishi G4M 'Betty' bomber east of Sakar Island, his fourth aerial victory, while other pilots downed over 61 enemy aircraft.

On 26 July 1944, he was made commanding officer of the 342nd Fighter Squadron and was promoted to major on 7 October. During this time, the 348th FG began flying missions in support of the Philippines campaign. Stationed in Leyte, the unit began conducting fighter sweeps in support of Allied forces' push towards north of the Philippines. On 11 December, Benz shot down a Nakajima Ki-43 'Oscar' over Cebu, his fifth aerial victory and hence, earning the title of flying ace. Four days later, he shot down a Mitsubishi A6M5-52 over Semirara Island, his sixth aerial victory. On 20 December, he scored his last aerial victories of the war, when he shot down two more enemy aircraft during a strafing attack on an airfield in Mindoro.

In February 1945, the 348th FG transitioned from P-47s to the North American P-51 Mustangs. In June 1945, the unit moved to airfield at Ie Shima in Okinawa, where they began flying long-range missions over the Japanese Home Islands. During World War II, Benz was credited with the destruction of eight enemy aircraft, while flying 280 combat missions. While serving with the 348th FG, he flew P-47s bearing the names "The Old Man" and "The Dirty Old Man".

=== USAF career ===
After the end of World War II, Benz was appointed as commander of the 348th Fighter Group in Okinawa and commanded it till 1946 when the unit was inactivated. Benz continued to serve in the newly created United States Air Force. In September 1952, during the Korean War, he was appointed as commander of the 8th Fighter-Bomber Group at Suwon Air Base in South Korea, flying combat missions in the Lockheed F-80 Shooting Star and North American F-86 Sabre. Just two months after taking command of the 8th FBG, the unit became the first USAF unit in Korea to fly 50,000 combat sorties and first jet combat unit to attain such distinction.

Benz retired from the Air Force at the rank of colonel, in 1970.

== Later life ==
Benz died on March 21, 2010, at the age of 90. He is interred next to his wife at Fort Sam Houston National Cemetery.

== Awards and decorations ==
- Silver Star with bronze oak leaf cluster
- Legion of Merit
- Distinguished Flying Cross with two bronze oak leaf clusters
- Air Medal (Note: Escalle states that Benz was awarded nine Air Medals during World War II but does not state whether Benz was awarded Air Medal during the Korean War.)
