= 108th Operations Group =

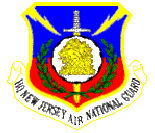
108th Operations Group

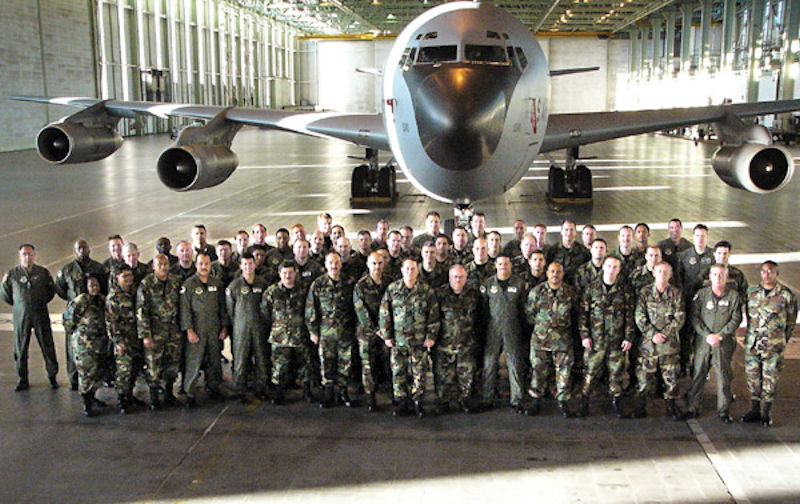
- Group KC-135 Stratotanker at Istres AB, France.
- Active: 1942–1946; 1946–1952; 1952–1974; 1993–present
- Country: United States
- Allegiance: New Jersey
- Branch: Air National Guard
- Type: Group
- Role: Air refueling
- Part of: New Jersey Air National Guard
- Garrison/HQ: Joint Base McGuire-Dix-Lakehurst, New Jersey
- Mottos: Per Caelum Victoriae (Latin for 'Through the Skies to Victory') (later Victory Through the Sky)

Commanders
- Notable commanders: Neel E. Kearby

Insignia
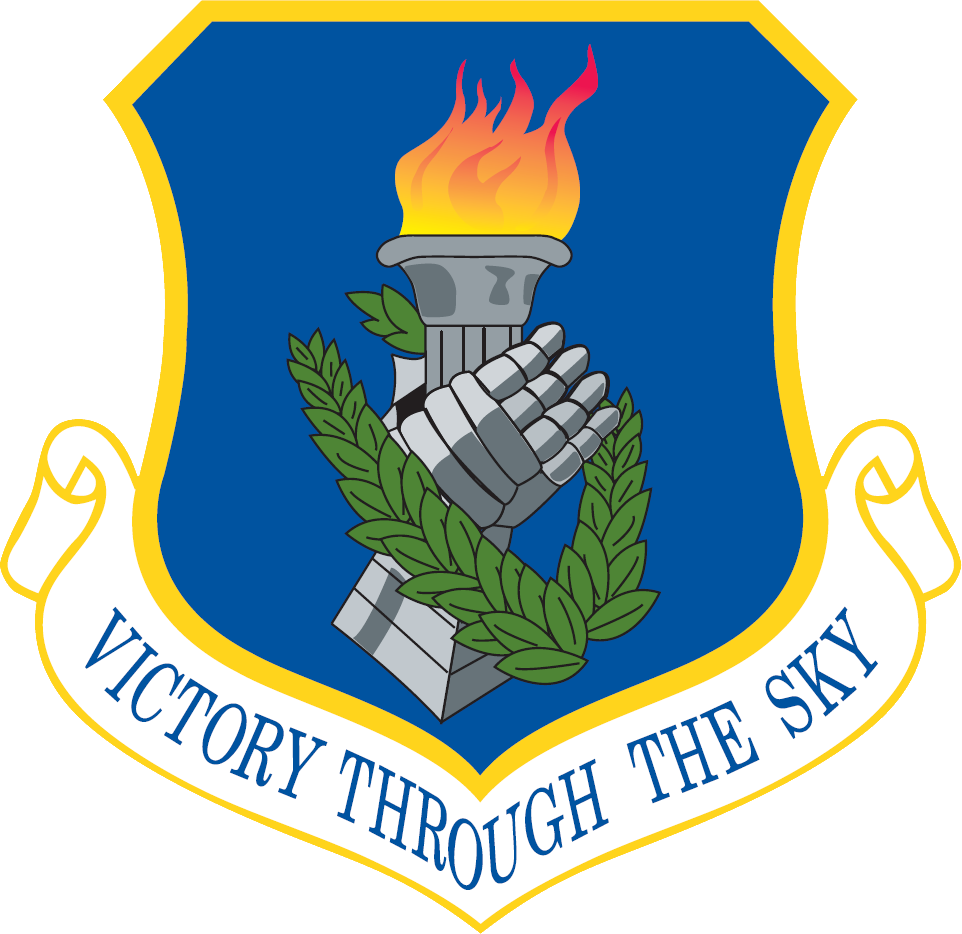
- 108th Operations Group emblem (Note: The group uses the 108th Wing emblem with the group designation on the scroll. Air Force Instruction 84-105, Organizational Lineage, Honors and Heraldry, 19 March 2013, para 3.3.3.)
- Tail stripe: Blue stripe "New Jersey" in yellow

The 108th Operations Group is a unit of the 108th Wing of the New Jersey Air National Guard, stationed at the McGuire AFB entity of Joint Base McGuire-Dix-Lakehurst, New Jersey. If activated to federal service with the U.S. Air Force, the group is gained by Air Mobility Command. Its primary mission is air refueling, currently performed with Boeing KC-46 Pegasus tankers.

The group also commands an intelligence squadron and a contingency response squadron, and previously operated a special operations airlift squadron. Its World War II predecessor, the 348th Fighter Group, was the most successful Republic P-47 Thunderbolt group in the Southwest Pacific Theater, credited with 396 aerial victories over half of all P-47 kills credited to Fifth Air Force. Its commander, Colonel Neel E. Kearby, was awarded the Medal of Honor for single-handedly destroying six enemy aircraft in one mission over Wewak on 11 October 1943.

The group produced more than twenty flying aces and earned two Distinguished Unit Citations during the war. After converting to North American P-51 Mustangs in 1945, the group ended the war flying ground-support missions in the Philippines and strikes against targets in Japan from Ie Shima. Following World War II, the group was redesignated as the 108th Fighter Group and allotted to the New Jersey National Guard in 1946, where it has served continuously in various forms since. It was mobilized for the Korean War in 1951 and again during the Berlin Crisis of 1961. Over the decades it has transitioned through fighter, fighter-bomber, interceptor, tactical fighter, and finally air refueling missions. The group received its current designation as the 108th Operations Group in 1993 when it was equipped with Boeing KC-135 Stratotankers, transitioning to the Boeing KC-46 Pegasus in 2023.

== Overview ==
The 108th Group mission is air refueling. The wing enhances the Air Force's capability to accomplish its primary missions of Global Reach and Global Power. It also provides aerial refueling support to Air Force, Navy and Marine Corps aircraft as well as aircraft of allied nations. The wing is also capable of transporting litter and ambulatory patients using patient support pallets during aeromedical evacuations.

In addition to their primary air refueling mission, the group also supports an Intelligence Squadron and a Contingency Response Group

== Units ==
The 108th Operations Group consists of the following units:

- 108th Operations Support Squadron
- 141st Air Refueling Squadron (KC-46A) "New Jersey", Orange Fin Flash
- 140th Cyber Operations Squadron

The 140th Cyber Operations Squadron is one of the twelve Air National Guard Cyber Protection Teams that defend networks and systems against threats.

- 150th Special Operations Squadron (C-32B)
- 170th Air Refueling Squadron (KC-46A)
- 204th Intelligence Squadron

The 204th Intelligence Squadron is the first Air National Guard squadron that is solely dedicated to providing intelligence instruction and training products to the Air Mobility Command. It is also the first course of its kind in the intelligence community that integrates active duty, Air National Guard and Air Force Reserve students.

During World War II, the group operated primarily in the Southwest Pacific Theater. It was the most successful Republic P-47 Thunderbolt unit in the Pacific War. The Group's commander, Colonel Neel Kearby ran up 20+ kills, including a 6-kills-in-1-mission, for which he was awarded the Medal of Honor. The Group scored 396 kills, over half of all the kills credited to Fifth Air Force P-47s, and won two United States Distinguished Unit Citations. The Group had 20 P-47 aces, including Bob Rowland, Lawrence O'Neill, Bill Banks, Bill Dunham, Walt Benz, Sam Blair, Robert Sutcliffe, and George Davis, who would later be awarded the Medal of Honor flying F-86s during the Korean War.

On 24 May 1946, the group was redesignated the 108th Fighter Group and allotted to the National Guard.

== History ==
=== World War II ===
The 348th Fighter Group was activated at Mitchel Field, New York, on 30 September 1942. It was equipped with the P-47 Thunderbolt. The 348th was one of the first USAAF groups to be equipped with the P-47.

==== 1943 ====
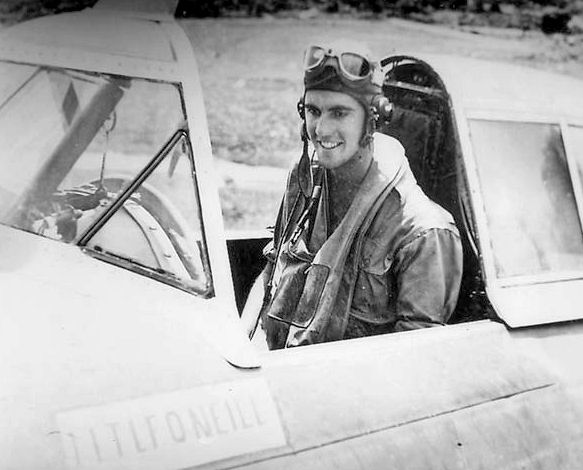
First Lieutenant Lawrence F. O’Neill of the 342nd Fighter Squadron, in the cockpit of his P-47D Thunderbolt following his quadruple victory on 26 December 1943 (Note: Aircraft is Republic P-47D-11-RA Thunderbolt, serial 42-22903, Kathy/Veni Vidi Vici. O'Neill survived the war and reached ace status with a total of 5 aerial victories.)

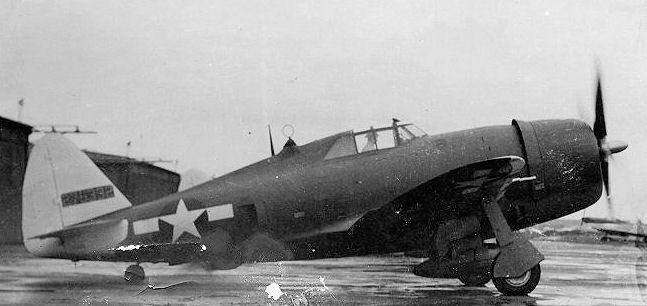
Group P-47D Thunderbolt (Note: Aircraft is Republic P-47D-11-RE Thunderbolt, serial 42-75332.)

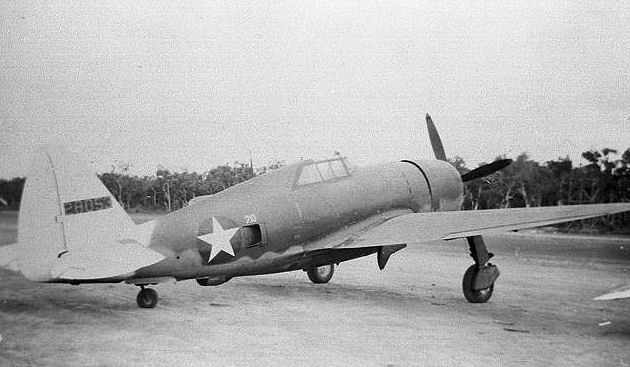
Group P-47D Thunderbolt (Note: Aircraft is Republic P-47D-2-RE Thunderbolt. serial 42-8053. This plane was destroyed in a ground collision on 18 June 1943. Baugher, Joe (2 June 2023). "1942 USAF Serial Numbers". Joe Baugher.)

After an extended period of training in the northeast United States, the personnel boarded the Army transport ship Henry Gibbons and left the wharf at Weehawken, New Jersey on 15 May 1943. The group's personnel all thought they were heading for the European theatre of war. However, they went through the Panama Canal instead and crossed the Pacific Ocean reaching Brisbane, Australia on 14 June 1943. They moved to Archer Field (Archerfield airfield) and waited for their aircraft to arrive.

The group's P-47D Thunderbolts began to arrive in Brisbane in the same month, and by the end of July after they had "run in" their engines on local training flights, the group began long-range missions to strike at Japanese targets in New Guinea. In mid-June the 348th's three squadrons (340th, 341st, 342d) made the 1,200-mile flight from Brisbane to Port Moresby, New Guinea. The group operated from New Guinea and Noemfoor until November 1944, flying patrol and reconnaissance missions and escorted bombers to targets in New Guinea and New Britain. The 460th Fighter Squadron, stationed at Noemfoor, New Guinea, was also later attached to the 348th Fighter Group on 23 September 1944 .

The arrival of the 348th as the first P-47 group in the Southwest Pacific area coincided with the opening of the Allied offensive in New Guinea. During the summer of 1943 the P-47 missions were chiefly as cover for bombers in the Lae-Salamaua area, and for transports carrying supplies to the new mountain locked airstrip at Tsili, only a few miles from the Japanese held Markham Valley. The group met its first air combat over Tsili on 16 August 1943, when two squadrons tangled with the fighter cover of an enemy bomber formation, and shot down three aircraft.

In September the 348th's planes provided cover for the paratroop landing at Nadzab in the Markham valley, and with the capture of Nadzab and Lae the group entered into one of the most spectacular phases of its overseas career, in a series of fighter sweeps, generally by flights of four planes, over the Japanese stronghold of Wewak.

Lieutenant Colonel Neel Kearby, the Commanding Officer of the 348th Fighter Group shot down his first Japanese aircraft on 4 September 1943. He shot down a second aircraft on 15 September 1943. Colonel Kearby was awarded the Medal of Honor for action over New Guinea on 11 October 1943. After leading a flight of four fighters to reconnoiter the enemy base at Wewak, Lt Col Kearby sighted a Japanese bomber formation escorted by more than 30 fighters. Despite the heavy odds and a low fuel supply, and although his mission had been accomplished, Kearby ordered an attack, personally destroying six of the enemy planes. For covering Allied landings and supporting ground forces on New Britain, 16–31 December 1943, the group was awarded a Distinguished Unit Citation.

==== 1944 ====
In 1944 the group began to attack airfields, installations, and shipping in western New Guinea, Ceram, and Halmahera to aid in neutralizing those areas preparatory to the US invasion of the Philippines. The group's pilots shot down 100 Japanese planes without the loss of a single pilot in aerial combat. From Finschhafen the group flew its first fighter-bomber missions. In the early spring of 1944, while the group was at Saidor, fighter-bomber work began in earnest with attacks on the Japanese concentrations in the Hansa Bay region just ahead of the advancing Australian troops

After 18 months in New Guinea the 348th boarded ship and plane for the Philippines. One squadron, the 460th, arrived several weeks before the other three, and proceeded to roll up an imposing score of enemy planes, shipping, and personnel destroyed, providing cover for convoys, flying patrols, escorted bombers, attacked enemy airfields, and supporting ground forces. During a three-week period it sank 50,000 tons of enemy shipping, which was slightly more than one-tenth of all the shipping sunk by the entire Fifth Air Force during the year 1944. On 10 November the 460th squadron deployed forward to Tacloban Airfield on Leyte, simultaneously escorting a group of B-25 bombers attacking a convoy loaded with an estimated 10,000 enemy troops en route to reinforce the Japanese army on Leyte. The squadron's planes were the first of the Army Air Force to fly over occupied Manila after the Japanese capture of the Philippines. A flight led by Colonel Dunham, made the first return flight on 17 November 1944.

The group's greatest day, in point of total of enemy planes destroyed, was 14 December 1944 when, in protection of the invasion fleet heading to Mindoro, 5 Japanese planes were shot down, an estimated 75 were destroyed and 20 more damaged, on the airfields of Negros Island only a few minutes flight from the Allied invasion force, which landed on Mindoro the following morning.

In aerial combat at the 348th's best day came on 24 December 1944 when its planes escorting B-24 Liberator heavy bombers in one of the first bomber strikes on Clark Field, met an attempted interception by an estimated 100 Japanese fighters. 32 of the enemy aircraft were definitely destroyed, 7 probably destroyed, the remainder were driven off, and the bombers proceeded undamaged to carry out their mission.

Early in December 1944, while the group's planes were operating from Taoloban strip, the majority of group personnel were camped inland near Burauen when the Japanese landed several hundred paratroops on an uncompleted airstrip less than a quarter of a mile from the group's camp, cutting the only road leading from the camp. For several days the camp was isolated between the paratroops on the East and the Japanese patrols on the West. Two men on guard post were surprised and killed by an enemy patrol, but the camp defense's prevented any breakthrough and the paratroops were finally wiped out by infantry and tanks.

When U.S. troops landed on Luzon the 348th, now in process of conversion from P-47's to North American P-51 Mustangs, began operation from San Marcelino airstrip a few days after the landing at San Marcelino and Subic Bay. From this location the unit entered upon what many of its members consider its most outstanding work of the war, bombing and strafing in close support of ground troops. This work lacks the excitement and glamor of serial combat, or even of bombing and strafing of seen targets. Bombs and bullets are poured into areas where the enemy is reported to be, and day after day the mission reports stated "Results unobserved due to foliage". Only rarely were advancing ground troops able to tell what part of the damage found was done by a particular air strike.

==== 1945 ====
At the time the 348th began ground support operations from San Marcelino, the infantry had taken Subic Bay and Olongapo and had started east with the objective of sealing off Bataan so that the Japanese, retreating southward from Lingayen, could not use the Bataan Peninsula's defensive strength as did the U.S. forces in 1942. However, a few miles East of Olongapo stubborn Japanese resistance suddenly had been met in Zigzag Pass, where the road climbed in a series of hairpin turns overlooked by the enemy's positions. American ground forces had suffered some casualties, had dug in, and in four days had been unable to make any appreciable gain.

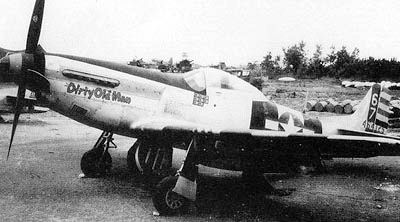
342d Fighter Squadron P-51D Mustang in 1945 (Note: Aircraft is North American P-51D-10-NA, serial 44-14175 Dirty Old Man.)

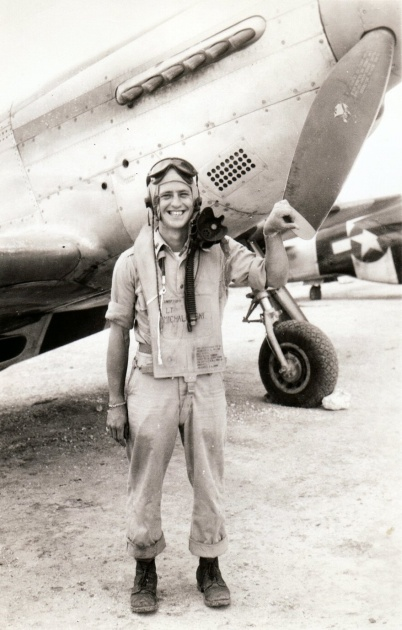
Second Lieutenant Stanley E. Michalowski, 342nd Fighter Squadron, standing by his P-51D Mustang, Ie Shima, Japan, August 1945.

On Leyte the 348th had done experimental bombing with a new and highly effective firebomb weapon, and it was proposed that it be used to break the deadlock in Zigzag Pass. However the infantry division occupying the west end of the pass was uncertain about the use of the bomb in close support of their troops, for fear of inaccurate bombing. So a Japanese supply area, well back of their front line, was bombed as a demonstration of accuracy, and was left neatly blanked with flame. There was no further lack of confidence. American infantry proceeded to direct the group's pilots to bomb and strafe just ahead of their front line, and for seven days advanced steadily until their mission of scaling off the Bataan Peninsula had been accomplished.

Occasionally the curtain of "unobserved results" would lift. One strike, directed by Filipino guerrillas who set off smoke pots to mark tan enemy bivouac area, was later found to have caused 700 Japanese casualties.

After another strike west of Fort Stotsenburg, ground troops were able to move in quickly and found 574 Japanese, all killed by the single air attack. Neigher of those missions involved more than 32 sorties and 30 missions a day. It would be impossible to estimate how many other thousands of enemy dead were covered with the phrase "results unobserved".

During the month of April 1945 the 348th set a record for tonnage of bombs dropped on the enemy, with a total of 2091.5 tons. Total ammunition expended was just under two million rounds. So far as is known, this bomb tonnage is the greatest every dropped in one month by any group, either fighter or bomber, and the accuracy of the bombing was attested repeatedly by reports from ground observers. Most of the record tonnage was dropped in the Ipo Dam area northeast of Manila, and helped pave the way for the infantry's capture of that vital control-point of Manila's water supply. From San Marcelino the 348th also flew missions over French Indochina, Hainan, China, and Formosa.

In May 1945 the group moved to Floridablanca airfield, west of Fort Stotsenburg, and from there continued attacks on Japanese ground troops, chiefly in the Cagayan Valley in northern Luzon. By the middle of June the enemy forces had disintegrated and scattered so that profitable targets were hard to find, So operations of the 348th were redirected to the Ryukyus, and the group began operations from Ie Shima in mid-July.

Contrary to expectations the Japanese air forces did not choose to fight, and in the following month only 15 enemy planes were shot down without loss to the 348th in air combat. However, there was an abundance of ground and shipping targets in Kyūshū and North China, and the group's P-51s took a constant toll of enemy transportation on water and land before the afternoon of 14 August when the planes of the 348th delivered the last bombs dropped on Japan before the order was given to "cease firing".

In the immediate postwar era, the group moved to Itami Airfield, Japan in October 1945 as part of Far East Air Forces, performing occupation duty. The 348th Fighter Group was inactivated at Itami Airfield on 10 May 1946.

=== Summary of Victories ===
Colonel Kearby went on to score 22 aerial victories. Other aerial aces of the group were Lt. Colonel W.D. Dunham – 16, Lieutenant Colonel William M. Banks – 9, Colonel R.R. Rowland – 8, Major Walter G. Benz Jr. – 8, Lieutenant Colonel E.F. Roddy – 8, Major S.V. Blair – 7, Captain G.A. Davis Jr. – 7, Captain M.E. Grant – 7, Major J.T. Moore – 7, Major E.S. Popek – 7, Major N.M. Brown – 6, Captain R.H. Fleischer – 6, Captain W.B. Foulis – 6, Captain R.C. Sutcliffe - 5, and First Lieutenant L.F. O'Neill - 5.

=== Air National Guard ===
The 348th Fighter Group was redesignated as the 108th Fighter Group and allotted to the New Jersey National Guard on 24 May 1946. It was organized at Newark Municipal Airport and extended federal recognition later that year. Two of its World War squadrons, the 341st (now the 141st Fighter Squadron) and 342d (now the 142d Fighter Squadron) were assigned to it, along with the 119th Fighter Squadron, which had been an observation squadron in the National Guard before the war. The 119th was located with group headquarters at Newark Municipal Airport, while the 141st was at Mercer Airport, near the state capital of Trenton, New Jersey. The 142d was an element of the Delaware National Guard at New Castle, Delaware.

Initially, the group reported to the 52d Fighter Wing of the New York National Guard and was supported by the 208th Air Service Group. In the fall of 1950, the Air National Guard reorganized its combat units under the wing base organization that had been used by the regular Air Force since 1947. In this reorganization, the 108th Fighter Wing was formed as the headquarters for the 108th Group and its support elements, organized into the 108th Air Base Group, 108th Maintenance and Supply Group and the 108th Medical Group.

=== Mobilization for the Korean War ===
In March 1951, the group was called to active duty and moved to Turner Air Force Base, Georgia, where it became part of Strategic Air Command. Only the 141st Fighter Squadron remained with the group on mobilization. (Note: The group's 142d Squadron was also mobilized, but was transferred to Air Defense Command, becoming an interceptor unit.) To fill out the unit, the 149th Fighter Squadron of the Virginia Air National Guard and the 153d Fighter Squadron of the Mississippi Air National Guard were assigned to the group. In May, the group and its squadrons became fighter bomber units.

=== Air defense ===
With return to state control, the group assumed the air defense mission. Despite its retention of the fighter bomber designation, it was gained by Air Defense Command (ADC) upon mobilization. ADC required the squadrons it gained to be designed to augment active duty squadrons capable of performing air defense missions for an indefinite period after mobilization independently of their parent wing. It was not until 1955 that the group was redesignated the 108th Fighter-Interceptor Group, when it received its first North American F-86E Sabres. Once again, the group commanded the 119th and 141st Squadrons, but not the 142d, which became part of another group. In October 1958, its parent received a new mission as the 108th Tactical Fighter Wing and the group was briefly inactivated.

=== Tactical fighter ===
The 108th Wing had been mobilized during the Berlin Crisis of 1961. This mobilization demonstrated that although mobilizing a wing with dispersed flying units was not a problem when the entire wing was called to active service, mobilizing individual flying squadron and elements to support it proved difficult. To resolve this, the Air Force determined to reorganize its National Guard wings by establishing groups with support elements for each of its squadrons to facilitate mobilization of elements of wings in various combinations when needed. Shortly after the 108th Wing returned to state control in July, the group was again activated as this plan was implemented. The group remained active until December 1974, when the Air Force inactivated groups located on the same station as the wing to which they were assigned.

=== Objective wing ===
In 1973 the group was activated again as the 108th Operations Group as the Air Force implemented the Objective Wing organization in the Air National Guard. It once again became the flying organization of the 108th Wing, equipped with Boeing KC-135 Stratotankers.

The 150th Special Operations Squadron was later added to the group, flying Boeing C-32s. On 20 September 2023, the group flew its last mission with the KC-135R, as it transitioned to becoming an associate squadron of the 305th Air Mobility Wing, flying Boeing KC-46 Pegasus tankers.

== Lineage ==
- Constituted as the 348th Fighter Group on 24 September 1942

Activated on 30 September 1942
Inactivated on 10 May 1946

- Redesignated 108th Fighter Group, Single Engine and allotted to the National Guard on 24 May 1946

Activated on 15 August 1946
Federally recognized on 16 October 1946
Federalized and called to active duty, 1 March 1951
Redesignated 108th Fighter-Bomber Group on 16 May 1951
Released from active duty and returned to New Jersey state control on 1 December 1952
Redesignated 108th Fighter-Interceptor Group on 1 July 1955
Inactivated on 1 July 1958

- Redesignated: 108th Tactical Fighter Group

Activated on 1 July 1958
Federalized and called to active duty, 1 October 1961
Released from active duty and returned to New Jersey state control on 30 August 1962
Inactivated on 9 December 1974

- Redesignated 108th Operations Group

Activated c. 1 January 1993

=== Assignments ===
- I Fighter Command, 30 September 1942 (attached to New York Fighter Wing until 29 October 1942, Boston Fighter Wing until 9 May 1943)
- V Fighter Command, 23 Jun 1943 – 10 May 1946 (attached to First Air Task Force c. 14 Aug 1943-c. 31 Jan 1944, 310th Bombardment Wing 1 May-25 Aug 1944, 309th Bombardment Wing until 7 November 1944, 85th Fighter Wing until 8 February 1945, 309th Bombardment Wing until 25 September 1945, 310th Bombardment Wing until 25 March 1946)
- New Jersey National Guard, 15 August 1946
- 52d Fighter Wing, c. 1 October 1947
- 108th Fighter Wing (later 108th Fighter-Bomber Wing), 1 November 1950 – 1 December 1952
- 108th Fighter-Bomber Wing (later 108th Fighter Interceptor Wing), 1 December 1952 – 1 October 1958
- 108th Tactical Fighter Wing, 1 October 1962 – 9 December 1974
- 108th Air Refueling Wing (later 108th Wing), c. 1 January 1993 – present

=== Components ===
- 119th Fighter Squadron (later 119th Fighter-Bomber Squadron, 119th Fighter-Interceptor Squadron), 28 December 1946 – c. 1950, c. March 1953 - 1 October 1958, 1 October 1961 – 15 October 1962
- 141st Tactical Fighter Squadron (later 141st Air Refueling Squadron): 8 September 1973 – 9 December 1974, 1 October 1993 – present (Note: On 8 September 1973, the 141st Tactical Fighter Squadron was withdrawn from the National Guard and inactivated, redesignated the 341st Fighter Squadron and disbanded. The 141st Aero Squadron (Pursuit), which had been demobilized on 19 July 1919 was reconstituted, redesignated the 141st Tactical Fighter Squadron, allotted to the Air National Guard and activated in its place. DAF/PRM Letter 719p, Subject: Organization Actions Affecting Certain Air National Guard units, 31 July 1973.)
- 149th Fighter Squadron, 28 February 1951 – 1 December 1951
- 150th Air Refueling Squadron (later 150th Special Operations Squadron), 1 October 1993 – 31 March 2008, unknown – present
- 153d Fighter Squadron (later 153d Fighter-Bomber Squadron), 28 February 1951 – 1 December 1952
- 170th Air Refueling Squadron, 11 March 2023 - present
- 340th Fighter Squadron: 30 September 1942 – 10 May 1946
- 341st Fighter Squadron (later 141st Fighter Squadron, 141st Fighter-Bomber Squadron, 141st Fighter-Interceptor Squadron: 30 September 1942 – 10 May 1946, c. 26 May 1949 – 1 December 1952, 1 December 1952 – 1 October 1958, 1 October 1962 – 8 September 1973
- 342d Fighter Squadron (later 142d Fighter Squadron): 30 September 1942 – 10 May 1946, 6 September 1946 – 1 November 1950
- 460th Fighter Squadron: 23 September 1944 – 10 May 1946

=== Stations ===
- Mitchel Field, New York, 30 September 1942
- Bradley Field, Connecticut, 4 October 1942
- Westover Field, Massachusetts, 29 October 1942
- Providence Airport, Rhode Island, c. 3 January 1943
- Westover Field, Massachusetts, 28 April-9 May 1943
- Jackson Airfield (7 Mile Drome), Port Moresby, Papua New Guinea, 23 June 1943
- Finschhafen Airfield, New Guinea, 16 December 1943
- Saidor Airfield, New Guinea, 29 March 1944
- Wakde Airfield, Netherlands East Indies, 22 May 1944
- Kornasoren Airfield Noemfoor, Schouten Islands, New Guinea, 26 August 1944
- Tacloban Airfield, Leyte, Philippines, 16 November 1944
- Tanauan Airfield, Leyte, Philippines, 4 February 1945
- Floridablanca Airfield, Luzon, Philippines, 15 May 1945
- Ie Shima Airfield, Okinawa, 9 July 1945
- Itami Airfield, Japan, October 1945 – 10 May 1946
- Newark Municipal Airport, New Jersey, 15 August 1946
- Turner Air Force Base, Georgia, 1 March 1951
- Godman Air Force Base, Kentucky, 11 December 1951 – 1 December 1952
- McGuire Air Force Base (became part of Joint Base McGuire Dix Lakehurst), New Jersey, 1 December 1952 – present

=== Aircraft ===
- Republic P-47 Thunderbolt, 1942–1945, 1946–1952
- North American P-51 Mustang, 1945, 1952–1955
- North American F-86 Sabre, 1955–1958, 1962–1965
- Republic F-105 Thunderchief, 1965–1974
- Boeing KC-135 Stratotanker, 1993–2023
- Boeing KC-46 Pegasus, 2023–present

== See also ==
- George Andrew Davis Jr.
- Neel E. Kearby
