= Robert R. Rowland =

USAF general and World War II flying ace (1917–2003)

- Born: October 8, 1917; Lodi, Ohio
- Died: January 6, 2003 (aged 85); Virginia Beach, Virginia
- Burial place: Princess Anne Memorial Park, Virginia Beach, VA
- Military career
- Branch: United States Air Force
- Service years: 1938–1968
- Rank: Major general
- Nickname: Dick
- Service number: 0-22470
- Commands: 348th Fighter Group; 21st Fighter-Bomber Wing
- Awards: Air Force Distinguished Service Medal; Distinguished Flying Cross; Soldier's Medal

Robert Richard Rowland (October 8, 1917 – January 6, 2003) was a major general in the United States Air Force. He commanded the 348th Fighter Group and was a P-47 Thunderbolt fighter ace in the Pacific War theater of World War II. He commanded the 21st Fighter-Bomber Wing in Europe during the Cold War and was chief of the Air Force Advisory Group during the Vietnam War.

== Early life and education ==
Rowland was born in Lodi, Ohio, in 1917. He graduated from Lodi High School in 1935. He attended Ohio State University and the University of Maryland, majoring in sciences.

== Army Air Corps ==
Rowland joined the Army Air Corps at Fort Hays, Columbus, Ohio in January 1938. He was assigned to flying school Randolph Field, Texas, and graduated from pursuit course at Kelly Field, Texas, Feb. 1, 1939. He was assigned to the 94th Pursuit Squadron, 1st Pursuit Group, Selfridge Field, Michigan then transferred to the 16th Pursuit Group, Albrook Field, Panama Canal Zone.

In September 1941, he returned to the United States and was assigned as a flight instructor and squadron operations officer, Air Corps Advanced Flying School, Craig Field, Alabama.

== World War II ==
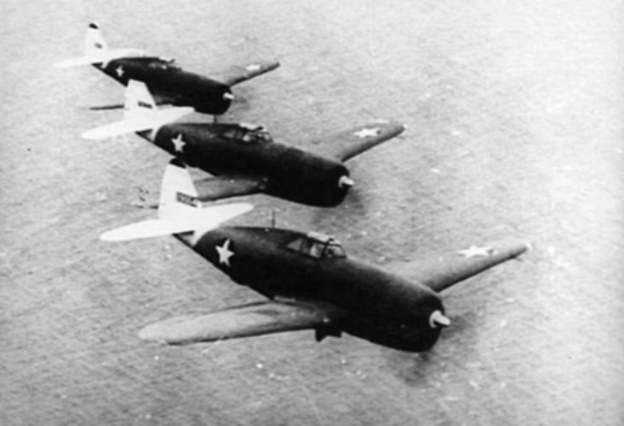
Republic P-47D Thunderbolt fighters from the 348th Fighter Group, based at Port Moresby, New Guinea

In December 1941, he transferred to Tuskegee Army Flying School, Tuskegee, Alabama, where he was director of advanced training and director of fighter training for the Tuskegee Airmen.

In February 1943, he was transferred to the 348th Fighter Group in Providence, Rhode Island, as the group executive officer. In May 1943 the group deployed to New Guinea as the first P-47 Thunderbolt group assigned to the Southwest Pacific.

Rowland flew 203 combat missions and became an ace with eight confirmed enemy aircraft downed. He participated in the campaigns New Guinea, Philippines, Solomon Islands, and the South China areas. The 348th Fighter Group specialized in air-ground, close support and support of amphibious operations. Rowland P-47 was named Miss Mutt/Pride of Lodi Ohio.

During one month of the Philippine campaign, 348th Fighter Group dropped a greater tonnage of bombs than any single bomber group in the theater. Ground forces intelligence credited his group with the destruction of more than 10,000 Japanese military personnel during this period. During one phase in which they were concentrating on the air superiority mission, his group shot down 231 confirmed Japanese aircraft in the air with only a single pilot lost.

== Post World War II ==
Upon return from combat, General Rowland was assigned as chief, Tactical Air Force Branch, Tactical Air Force and Joint Training Division, Continental Air Forces at Bolling Field, D.C.

He was assigned as chief of the Operations Division of the Strategic Air Command in July 1946. In August 1947 he was reassigned to the Air Command and Staff School at Maxwell Air Force Base in Alabama. He graduated from the Air War College there in June 1952 and was assigned to the Central Intelligence Agency in Washington, DC.

=== 21st Fighter-Bomber Wing ===
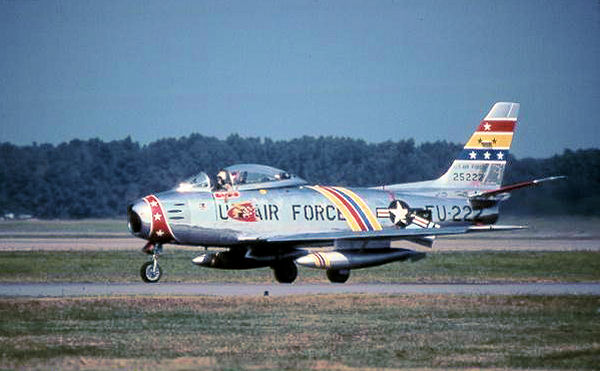
F-86F of the 72nd Fighter-Bomber Squadron, 21st Fighter-Bomber Wing, Chambley Air Base, France, 1955

In April 1953 he assumed command of the 21st Fighter-Bomber Wing at George Air Force Base in California. The 21st was first tactical F-86 Sabre wing for special weapons operations. The wing moved to Chambley Air Base, France in December 1954 and transferred to Ramstein, Germany in July 1956.

Rowland was the assistant deputy chief of staff, operations, U.S. Forces in Europe from September 1947 until he returned to the US in July 1958. In July 1960 he became secretary of the Air Staff.

== Vietnam ==
In December 1962, Rowland became chief, Air Force Section, Military Assistance Advisory Group, Vietnam.

Rowland was promoted to major general in April 1965 and became chief of staff of the Pacific Air Forces in September 1965.
