= William M. Banks =

American flying ace (1915–1983)

William McGowan Banks
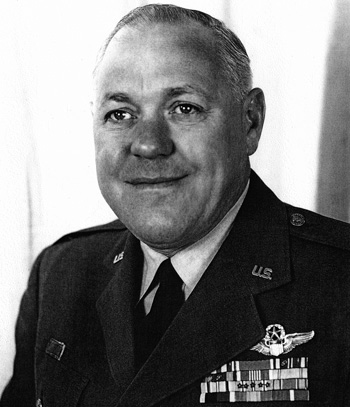
- Born: September 1, 1915; Raleigh, West Virginia, U.S.
- Died: May 6, 1983 (aged 67); San Antonio, Texas, U.S.
- Military career
- Allegiance: United States
- Branch: United States Air Force
- Service years: 1933–1963
- Rank: Colonel
- Nickname: Bill
- Unit: 348th Fighter Group
- Commands: 342nd Fighter Squadron; 348th Fighter Group; 82nd Fighter Group; Headquarters Squadron, 33rd Fighter Wing
- Conflicts: World War II
- Awards: Silver Star; Legion of Merit (2); Distinguished Flying Cross (3); Air Medal (8)

William McGowan Banks (September 1, 1915 – May 6, 1983) was an American flying ace in the 348th Fighter Group. He retired as a colonel from the United States Air Force in 1963, after 30 years of military service.

== Early life ==
Born on 1915 in Raleigh, West Virginia, Banks joined the West Virginia National Guard in 1933 and received an honorable discharge on 1936.

== Military career ==
After completing college, he enlisted in the Aviation Cadet Program of the U.S. Army Air Corps on March 15, 1941. He served as a flying cadet at Kelly Field in Texas, from March 1941 to October 1941. In November 1941, he was awarded his pilot wings and was commissioned as second lieutenant.

=== World War II ===
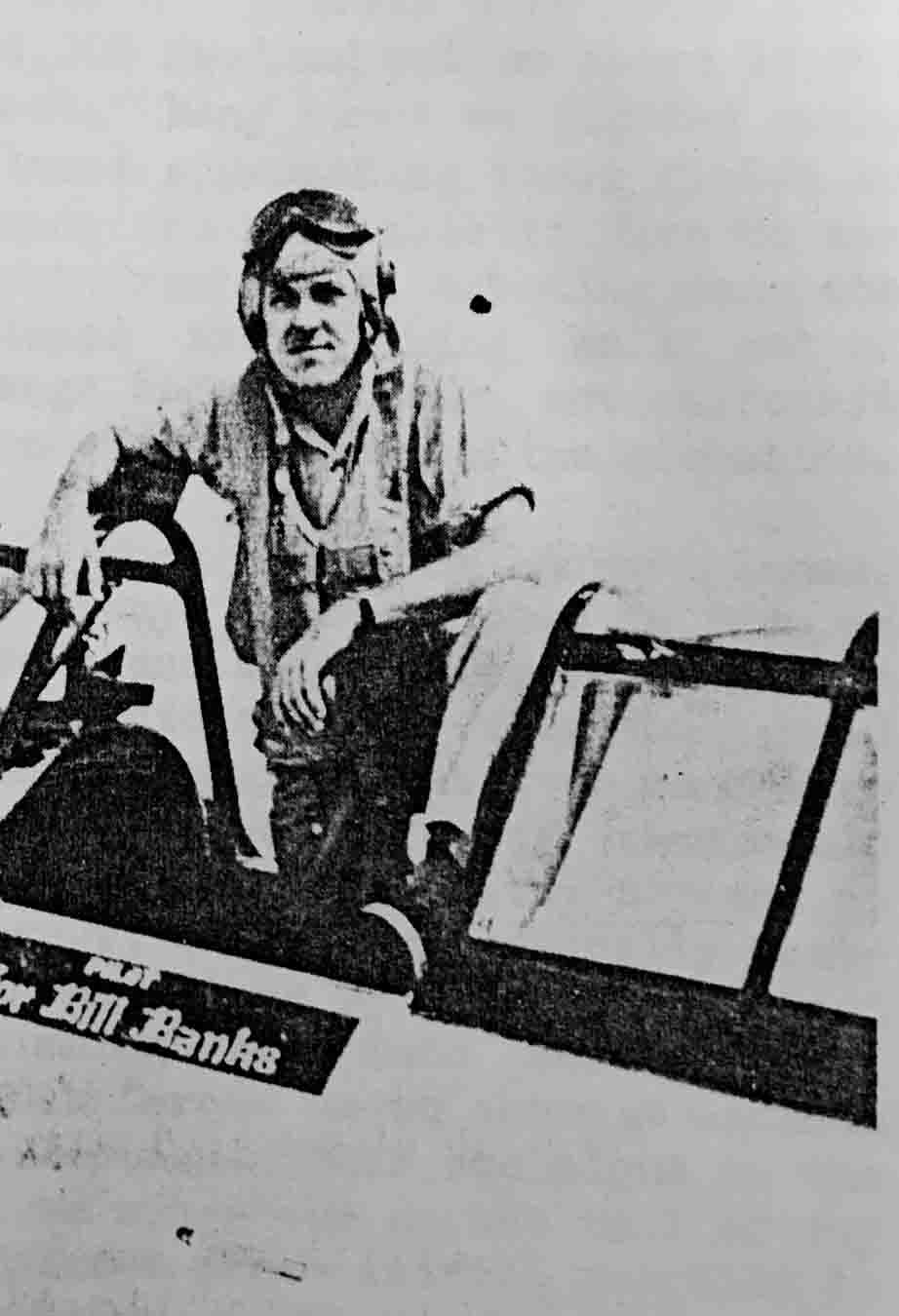
Banks onboard his P-47 in Leyte (1944)

After receiving his pilot wings, he was assigned to the 62nd Pursuit Squadron of the 56th Pursuit Group and flew P-40 Warhawks in defence of New York, following the Japanese attack on Pearl Harbor on December 7, 1941. In July 1942, he was assigned to the 90th Fighter Squadron of the 80th Fighter Group at Bradley Field in Connecticut and was promoted to captain in October 1942 and in November 1942, he was assigned to the 342nd Fighter Squadron of the 348th Fighter Group, where he was made the commanding officer of the squadron.

The 348th Fighter Group, which was equipped with the P-47 Thunderbolts, undertook training at the East Coast of the United States, before being assigned to the Asiatic-Pacific Theater in May 1943. In late July 1943, the 348th FG arrived in New Guinea via Australia. The unit soon started flying P-47s in combat operations and on September 13, 1943, Banks scored his first aerial victory, when he shot down a Nakajima Ki-43 "Oscar". On September 15, he shot down a Ki-43 and A6M Zero over Wewak, and on September 25, he shot down a Mitsubishi Ki-46 "Dinah" reconnaissance aircraft. He became a flying ace on December 20, when he shot down another Ki-46, his fifth aerial victory. On January 31, 1944, he shot down a Kawasaki Ki-61 "Tony" east of Cape Gloucester, his sixth and final aerial victory of his first tour. He took a shore leave in the United States on May 24, 1944.

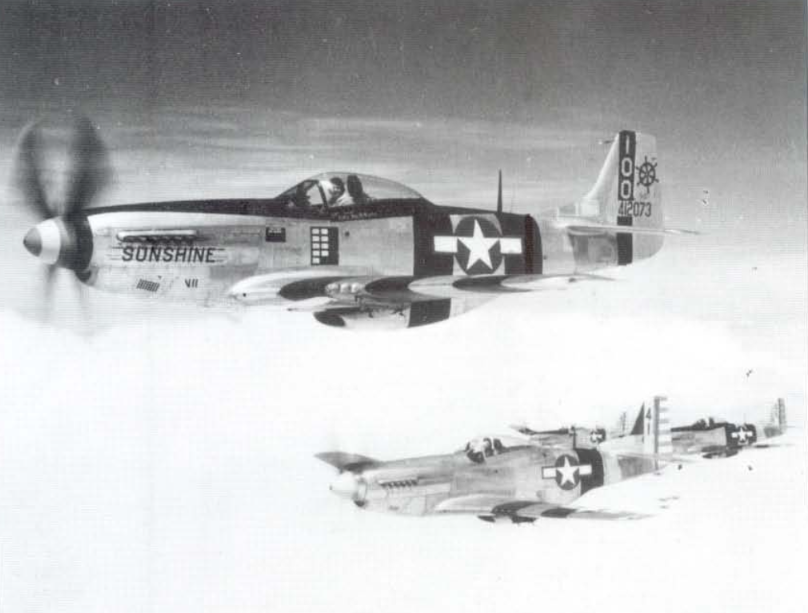
P-51K-10 "SUNSHINE VII" was flown by Banks from le Shima during the final months of the war in the Pacific (1945)

He rejoined the 348th FG several months later. During this time, the 348th FG began flying missions in support of the Philippines campaign. In early November 1944, the 348th FG moved to Tacloban Field in Leyte, where they began flying long-range bomber escorts for B-24 Liberators attacking Japanese airfields and other industrial targets. During the fighter sweeps conducted in December 1944, Banks shot down a Mitsubishi A6M3-32 on December 11 and on December 24, on a mission to escort several B-24s on a bombing mission of the Japanese-held Clark Field at Luzon, Banks shot down two more Zeroes, part of a group of Japanese aircraft attempting to harass the bombers, which were his final aerial victories of the war. He was awarded a Silver Star for this action.

In February 1945, he was promoted to lieutenant colonel and on the same month, the 348th FG transitioned from P-47s to P-51 Mustangs at San Marcelino. In June 1945, he was made commander of the 348th FG and the unit moved to airfield at Ie Shima in Okinawa, where they began flying long-range missions over the Japanese Home Islands. He remained in the command of the 348th FG in Ie Shima till November 1945.

During World War II, Banks was credited with the destruction of 9 enemy aircraft, while flying 237 combat missions. While serving with the 348th FG, he flew P-47s and P-51 bearing the name "Sunshine".

=== Post war ===
After the end of World War II, Banks continued to serve in the newly created United States Air Force. After attending Air War College at Maxwell Air Force Base in Alabama, from June 1951 to June 1952, he served in a variety of command and staff positions over the next several years, including serving as Chief of the Air Force Section with Military Assistance Advisory Group in Norway from December 1951 to July 1954.

On January 15, 1961, while serving as the deputy commander of the Boston Air Defense Sector at Stewart Air Force Base in New York, Texas Tower 4, a general surveillance radar station, located 63 miles (101 km) south-southeast off the coast of Long Island, New York in 185 feet (56 m) of water, was destroyed by a winter storm, resulting in the deaths of all twenty-eight airmen and civilian contractors who were manning the station. Banks was charged with involuntary manslaughter and two other officers, commanding officer and executive officer of the 4604th Air Support Squadron, were charged with dereliction of duty. All the charges against them were dismissed by a court martial board on June and August 1961.

Banks' final assignment was at Kelly Air Force Base in Texas, where he served on the staff with Headquarters San Antonio Air Material Area. He retired from the Air Force on July 1, 1963.

== Later life ==
Banks was married to Mary Goldsmith (1928–1999). They had a son.

Banks died on May 6, 1983, at the age of 67. He was buried at the Sunset Memorial Park in Beckley, West Virginia.

== Awards and decorations ==
His awards include:

USAF Command Pilot badge
Silver Star	Legion of Merit with bronze oak leaf cluster	Distinguished Flying Cross with two bronze oak leaf clusters
Air Medal with one silver and two bronze oak leaf clusters	Air Force Commendation Medal	Air Force Presidential Unit Citation with bronze oak leaf cluster
Air Force Outstanding Unit Award	American Defense Service Medal	American Campaign Medal
Asiatic-Pacific Campaign Medal with silver campaign star	World War II Victory Medal	Army of Occupation Medal with 'Japan' clasp
National Defense Service Medal with service star	Air Force Longevity Service Award with silver oak leaf cluster	Philippine Liberation Medal

=== Silver Star citation ===
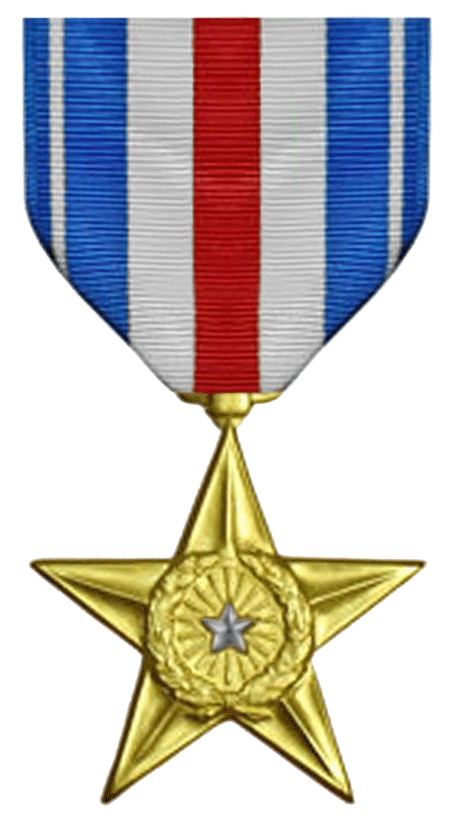

Banks, William M.
Major (Air Corps), U.S. Army Air Forces
342nd Fighter Squadron, 348th Fighter Group, 5th Air Force
Date of Action: December 24, 1944

Citation:

The President of the United States of America, authorized by Act of Congress July 9, 1918, takes pleasure in presenting the Silver Star to Major (Air Corps) William McGowan Banks (ASN: 0–429515), United States Army Air Forces, for gallantry in action as Pilot of a P-47 fighter airplane of the 342d Fighter Squadron, 348th Fighter Group, Fifth Air Force, in action during an escort mission to Clark Field, Luzon, Philippine Islands, on 24 December 1944. Following his plan of preceding a main body of fighters to gain information on the deployment of enemy opposition, Major Banks led an element of two of a total force of sixty-six P-47 type aircraft. On approaching the target, he climbed to attack several enemy airplanes and, concentrating his fire on one of them, sent it crashing to the ground. After apprising his formation of the strength and deployment of Japanese aircraft in the area, he joined in the ensuing battle and brought down another fighter which was trying to escape. His squadron, taking full advantage of the advance information he supplied, accounted for thirty-two of the interceptors. The outstanding leadership and gallantry displayed by Major Banks reflect the highest traditions of the United States Army Air Forces.
