= Paul Wurtsmith =

United States Army Air Forces general (1906–1946)

Paul Bernard Wurtsmith
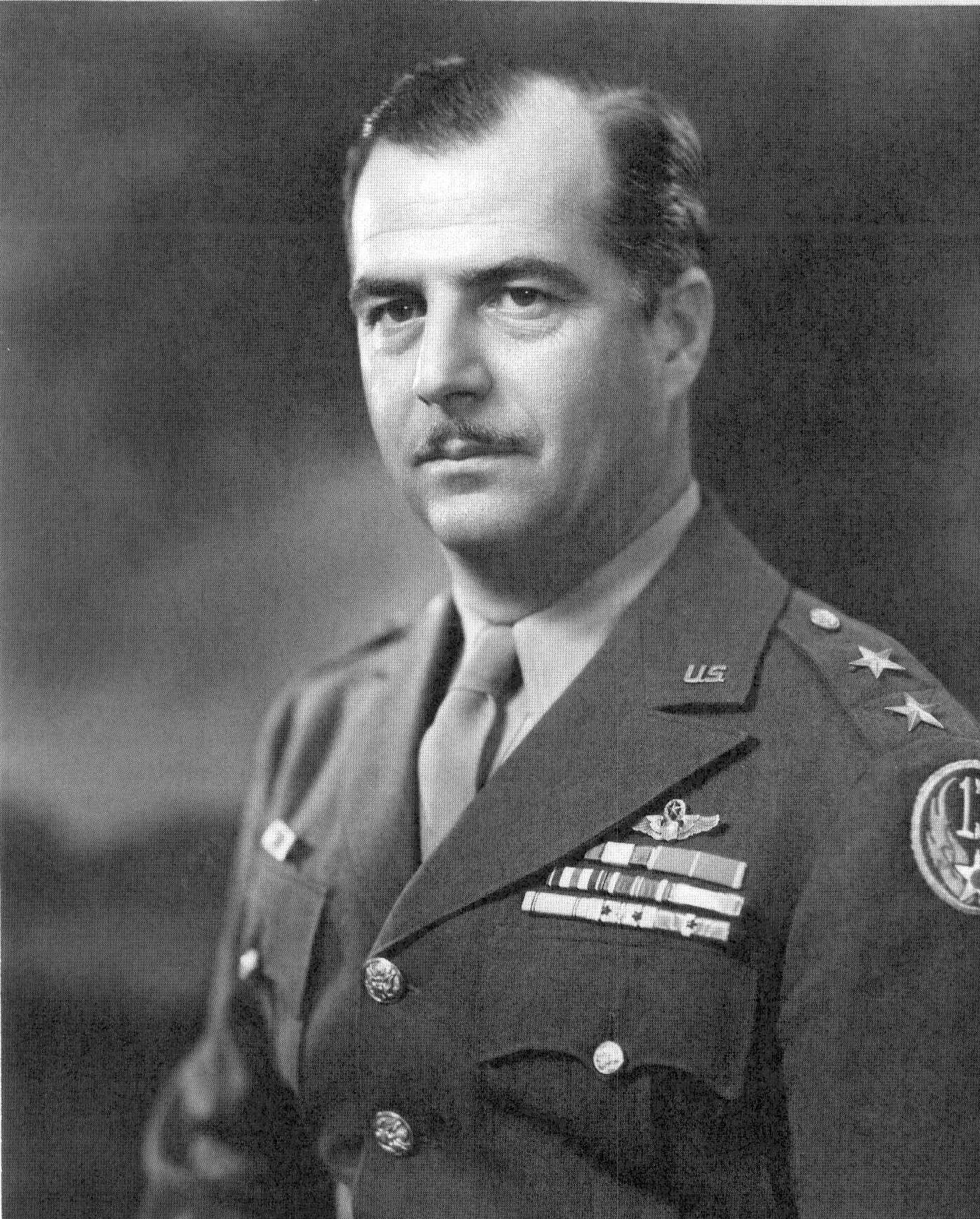
- Major General Paul B. Wurtsmith
- Born: 9 August 1906; Detroit, Michigan
- Died: 13 September 1946 (aged 40); Cold Mountain, North Carolina
- Burial place: Arlington National Cemetery
- Military career
- Allegiance: United States of America
- Branch: United States Army
- Service years: 1928–1946
- Rank: Major General
- Nickname: Squeeze
- Commands: 17th Pursuit Squadron; 41st Pursuit Squadron; 49th Pursuit Group; V Fighter Command; Thirteenth Air Force; Eighth Air Force
- Conflicts: World War II: Air raids on Australia, 1942–43; New Guinea campaign; Philippines Campaign (1944–45); Borneo Campaign (1945)
- Awards: Distinguished Service Medal (2); Silver Star; Distinguished Flying Cross; Air Medal; Commander of the Order of the British Empire

Paul Bernard Wurtsmith (9 August 1906 – 13 September 1946) was a United States Army Air Forces general during World War II.

Enlisting in the United States Army Air Corps as a flying cadet in 1927, Wurtsmith was commissioned in 1928. Over the next 13 years, he served in instructional and command positions. He took over command of the 49th Pursuit Group in December 1941 and between March 1942 and January 1943, his fighters downed 78 enemy aircraft in the defense of Darwin in northern Australia, against Japanese air attacks. In 1943 he assumed command of the V Fighter Command, part of Major General George Kenney's Fifth Air Force. In 1945, he commanded the Thirteenth Air Force in the Southern Philippines and Borneo campaigns. After the war Wurtsmith served with the Strategic Air Command.

Wurtsmith was killed when his North American B-25 Mitchell medium bomber crashed near the summit of Cold Mountain near Asheville, North Carolina, on 13 September 1946. In February 1953, the United States Air Force named Wurtsmith Air Force Base in Oscoda Township, Michigan, in his honor.

== Early life ==
Paul Bernard Wurtsmith was born in Detroit, Michigan, on 9 August 1906, the eldest of three sons of Fred Bernard Wurtsmith, a railroad engineer on the Pere Marquette Railroad, and his wife Ella. Paul was educated at Holy Redeemer Grammar School and Cass Technical High School in Detroit. In his teenage years he earned some money working as a copy boy at The Detroit News and in his spare time he worked on a Ford Model-T hot rod. He attended the University of Detroit, where he earned a degree in aeronautical engineering.

He enlisted in the U.S. Army Air Corps as a flying cadet on 4 August 1927. On earning his wings through the successful completion of flight training at Kelly Field, San Antonio, Texas, he was directly commissioned as a second lieutenant in the Air Reserve on 23 June 1928. On 2 February 1929, he received a regular commission in the Army Air Corps. He married Irene Gillespie. The couple had no children. Wurtsmith joined the 94th Pursuit Squadron, the famed World War I "Hat in the Ring" Squadron, at Selfridge Field, Michigan. Over the next 13 years, he served in instructional and command positions. He won the Mitchell Trophy Air Race in 1930. On 1 October 1934, he was promoted to first lieutenant and was temporary captain from 7 August 1935 to 16 June 1936 before being promoted substantively on 2 February 1939. He graduated from the Air Corps Tactical School in 1939.

== World War II ==
=== Defense of Australia ===
Wurtsmith commanded the 17th Pursuit Squadron at Selfridge Field from September 1939 to July 1940, then the 41st Pursuit Squadron until January 1941. Still at Selfridge Field, he served with the 50th Pursuit Group until December 1941, when he assumed command of the 49th Pursuit Group at Key Field, Mississippi, shortly after the United States entered the war following the Japanese bombing of Pearl Harbor.

The 49th Pursuit Group was soon on its way to fight the Japanese in the South West Pacific. Arriving in Australia in February 1942, the 49th Pursuit Group moved to the Darwin area in March and April 1942. By this time, Darwin had been bombed several times. The 49th Pursuit Group became its principal defense. Conditions in the area were still primitive, and spare parts and equipment were scarce. Lacking adequate logistical support, the Americans were heavily dependent on their Australian allies. Morale in Darwin was low, but the sight of Wurtsmith's aircraft patrolling the skies provided an important boost.

Between December 1941 and March 1942, over 300 P-40 Kittyhawks, 100 P-400 and 90 P-39 Airacobras had been sent to Australia; of these, around 125 had been lost to enemy action in the Dutch East Indies campaign, 75 had been transferred to the RAAF, 74 were under or awaiting repair and perhaps another 100 had yet to be completely assembled. On 18 March, 33 P-39s, 92 P-40s and 52 P-400s were on hand. There were three USAAF pursuit groups in Australia, the 8th, 35th and 49th, but Wurtsmith's was the only one considered combat ready. Of the 102 pilots in his group, only Wurtsmith, with 4,800 hours of pursuit time, and his executive officer, Major Donald R. Hutchinson, with 2,600 hours, were veteran pilots. Five others had more than 600 hours and nine had about 15 hours. The remaining 89 pilots had no pursuit time at all.

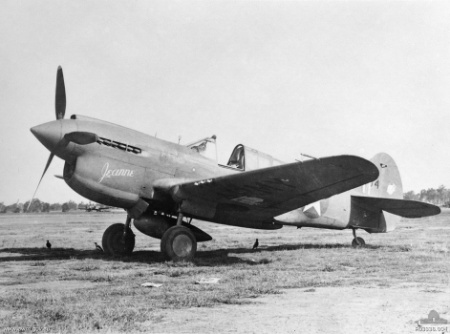
P-40E of the 7th Fighter Squadron, 49th Fighter Group in Australia, March 1942

The P-40s were better armored and faster in level flight than the Japanese fighters they were up against, mostly Mitsubishi A6M Zeroes, and could outdive them. On the other hand, the Japanese fighters had greater range, could outclimb the P-40, and were far more maneuverable. For an American P-40 pilot, risking a dogfight with a Japanese fighter was practically suicidal. Wurtsmith attempted to develop tactics that would exploit the strengths of the P-40 and minimize its weaknesses. The two-plane element was fixed as the chief unit of combat, and individual dogfighting was strictly prohibited. The P-40s would attempt to dive into a Japanese formation, attack, and then continue diving at a speed the Japanese fighters could not match. Above all, Wurtsmith attempted to make sure that he had enough P-40s in commission to outnumber the Japanese. The efforts of the ground crews and service troops made this possible. By May 1942, he had lost seven P-40s and three pilots while claiming the destruction of 38 Japanese aircraft. The heaviest Japanese attack had been by nine fighters and 24 bombers, which Wurtsmith had met with 50 P-40s; the P-40 pilots claimed 11 Japanese aircraft shot down. May was the first month that passed without a raid since January but the Japanese returned on four consecutive days in June, three of these raids consisting of 18 to 20 fighters and 27 bombers. That month nine P-40s and 13 Japanese aircraft were lost. Wurtsmith was promoted to colonel on 6 July 1942. Between March 1942 and January 1943, his fighters claimed to have downed 78 enemy aircraft.

=== New Guinea ===
In August 1942, Major General George Kenney assumed command of the Allied Air Forces in the South West Pacific Area, becoming the senior Allied air officer under the theater commander, General Douglas MacArthur. Kenney split the Allied Air Forces into Australian and American components, the American part becoming the re-formed Fifth Air Force in September 1942. Kenney concurrently commanded the Fifth Air Force, with Brigadier General Ennis Whitehead as his deputy. The major commands of the Fifth Air Force were the V Service Command under Major General Rush B. Lincoln, V Bomber Command under Brigadier General Kenneth Walker, and the V Fighter Command. Activated at Fort George Wright in April 1942 as V Interceptor Command, it was redesignated V Fighter Command in August. Wurtsmith assumed command on 11 November, with his headquarters at Port Moresby. Kenney told him that if he "made good", he would be promoted to brigadier general. If not, he would be sent home on a slow boat.

By early 1943, Kenney was convinced that Wurtsmith had "made good" in the Papuan Campaign, and he took the papers recommending Wurtsmith's promotion to MacArthur, who promised to approve it and sent it in to Washington, DC. One of MacArthur's staff quipped that he hoped Wurtsmith was over 21. Wurtsmith was actually 36; but MacArthur, who had been promoted to the rank of brigadier general at age 37, icily replied, "We promote them out here for efficiency, not age." Wurtsmith was duly promoted on 8 February 1943. He also became one of a handful of American officers to be decorated by the Australian government, being awarded the Commander of the Order of the British Empire for "excellence of training and direction of fighter operations in New Guinea". The award was eventually presented by General Sir Thomas Blamey on Leyte in March 1945.

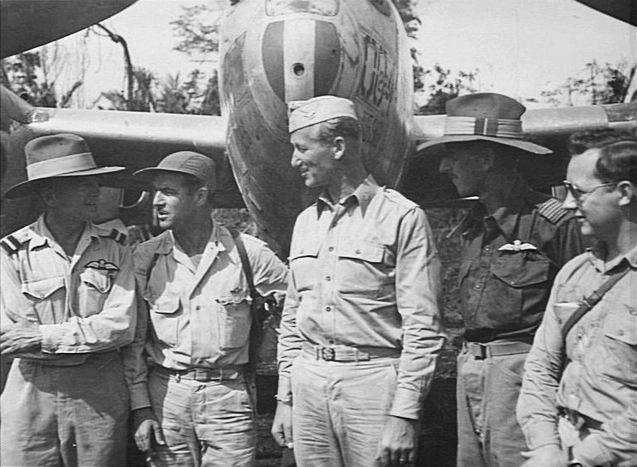
The first Allied pilots to try out airstrip built by engineers of No. 62 Works Wing RAAF at Tadji are greeted by Air Commodore F. R. W. Scherger (extreme left) who controlled all Allied air operations from captured strips at Aitape. Left to right: Brigadier General Paul Wurtsmith, Commanding General, V Fighter Command (pilot of first allied combat plane to land); Colonel Leif J. Sverdrup (who squeezed into General Wurtsmith's single seated P-38 Lightning); Wing Commander W. A. C. Dale, Task Force Engineer, and Colonel Robert Morrissey, Chief of Staff, V Fighter Command (pilot of second lightning to land). Wurtsmith's plane is in background.

The first long-range American fighter was the twin-engined P-38 Lightning but none reached the South West Pacific Area until October 1942 and, beset with a host of mechanical difficulties, it was not until December 1942 that they flew their first major combat mission over New Guinea. Deliveries were suspended in January 1943 owing to the requirements of the North African Campaign, forcing Kenney to accept the P-47 Thunderbolt, the first of which arrived in Australia in July 1943. Early model P-47s had less range than P-40 Kittyhawks until 200-imperial-gallon (910 L) fuel tanks could be manufactured for them in Australia. These enabled the 348th Fighter Group to become operational in August 1943. Though the tanks were very successful on the P-38s and P-40s, overloading the P-47s caused several crashes, and the pilots were reluctant to fly with more than 505 US gallons (1,910 L) of fuel. In 1945, the P-47s were replaced by P-51 Mustangs. By September 1943, Wurtsmith's five fighter groups had 598 aircraft but this included 70 P-39s, 30 P-400s and 118 P-40s, half of which were in the depots. The technical representative of Bell Aircraft reported that the P-39s and P-40s averaged 300 combat hours. That of Curtiss-Wright similarly reported that the P-40s had from 300 to 500 combat hours, which was equivalent to about 2,000 normal hours. General Kenney wrote to General Henry H. Arnold that "With the possible exception of Chennault, I do not believe that anyone else is flying stuff as old and worn out as these youngsters out here."

In New Guinea, the main role of the fighters was escort—something not foreseen before the war. Early losses of bombers made fighter protection the rule rather than the exception, and if fighter cover was not available, the bombers flew by night. During the last half of 1943, V Fighter Command flew 6,607 sorties in support of bombers and 10,215 to protect transports, out of 24,397 sorties for the period in total. These missions often depended upon securing forward fighter fields, particularly for long missions. Wurtsmith made what he claimed was the "shortest landing ever made in a P-40" at Marilinan to see if it could serve as a forward fighter strip. He proved that it could, although a better site was subsequently located at nearby Tsili Tsili. This base allowed Wurtsmith's fighters to support the bombing of Wewak and the landing at Nadzab. The range of the fighters was increased by the addition of external 200-gallon fuel tanks. Then, in July 1944, Charles Lindbergh, who was visiting the South West Pacific area as civilian observer, taught Wurtsmith's pilots how to obtain greater range by economical operation of their engines. The new technique increased the combat radius of the P-38s to 600 miles (970 km), a gain of some 30 percent. Combining three external droppable tanks with new techniques increased the range of the P-40s to 650 miles (1,050 km).

On 30 January 1945, Wurtsmith replaced Major General St. Clair Streett as commander of the Thirteenth Air Force. He was promoted to the rank of major general on 19 March 1945. The Thirteenth Air Force was tasked with the support of Lieutenant General Robert L. Eichelberger's Eighth United States Army in the Victor series of operations to clear the Southern Philippines that included the Invasion of Palawan, Battle of the Visayas, and the Battle of Mindanao. Operating under Air Vice Marshal William Bostock's RAAF Command, the Thirteenth Air Force also supported Lieutenant General Sir Leslie Morshead's Australian I Corps in the Oboe series of operations against Japanese forces in Borneo.

== Post-war years ==
Wurtsmith relinquished command of the Thirteenth Air Force in July 1946 and returned to the United States, where he was assigned to the headquarters of the Strategic Air Command (SAC) at Washington, DC's Bolling Field. Though perhaps an unusual posting for a fighter expert, SAC was then commanded by Kenney. Wurtsmith attended the 1946 Operation Crossroads nuclear weapons tests on Bikini Atoll as an observer, and in September 1946, he was appointed commander of the Eighth Air Force, one of SAC's three numbered air forces. On 12 September 1946, he took off from MacDill Field, Florida, in a B-25 Mitchell. He first flew to Bolling Field, where he had some business, then on to Selfridge Field. He paid a visit to his family, whom he had not seen for three years, including his mother Ella, whose 77th birthday was on 14 September. On 13 September, with Wurtsmith at the controls, the Mitchell, 44-30227, set out for MacDill Field in bad weather, flying at 6,000 feet (1,800 m)—below the safe altitude for the area. At around 11:20 all on board were killed when the aircraft crashed into Cold Mountain, about 20 miles (32 km) southwest of Asheville, North Carolina. The official report listed the cause of the crash as "miscalculation of altitude".

Wurtsmith's remains were recovered from Cold Mountain and were interred in Arlington National Cemetery on 18 September 1946. In February 1953, the United States Air Force named Wurtsmith Air Force Base in Oscoda, Michigan, in his honor. Special guests at the dedication ceremony included his mother Ella, his widow Irene, his nephews Paul D. Wurtsmith and Fred Wurtsmith, and George Kenney. General Thomas D. White told the crowd that the base was being named after a man who was "probably the best fighter pilot and fighter tactician in all of World War II". In 1954, Ella Wurtsmith was named Michigan Mother of the Year. Among the letters recommending her for the honor was one from General MacArthur.
