= 170th Air Refueling Squadron =

New Jersey Air National Guard unit

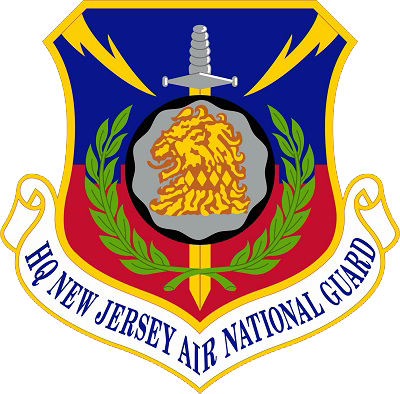
170th Air Refueling Squadron

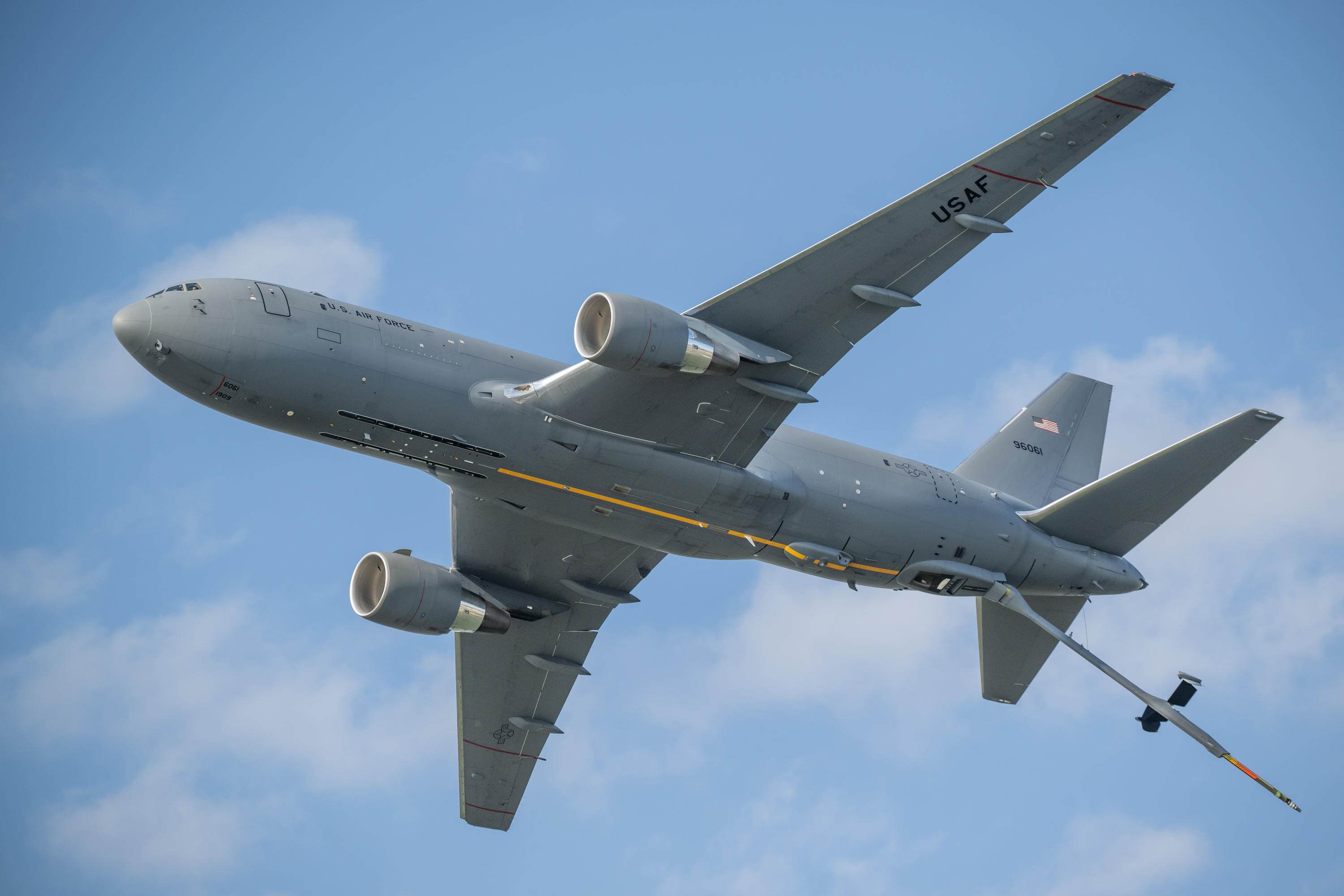
- KC-46A Pegasus of the 305th Air Mobility Wing (Note: The 170th is an associate of the 305th Air Mobility Wing and thus shares its aircraft.)
- Active: 2024–present
- Country: United States
- Allegiance: New Jersey
- Branch: Air National Guard
- Type: Squadron
- Role: Air refueling
- Part of: New Jersey Air National Guard
- Garrison/HQ: McGuire Air Force Base, New Jersey.
- Equipment: Boeing KC-46A Pegasus

Commanders
- Current commander: Lt Col Matthew J. Secko

Insignia
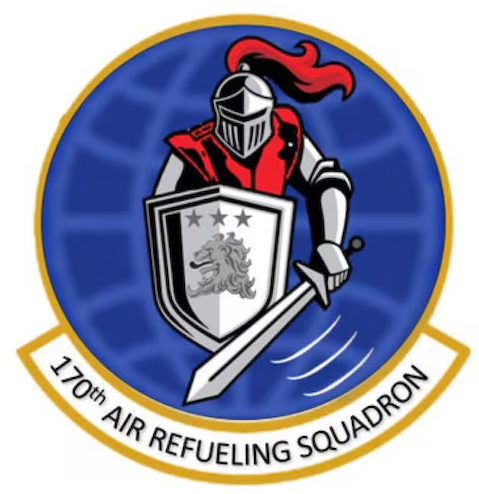
- 170th Air Refueling Squadron emblem

Aircraft flown
- Tanker: KC-46A Pegasus

The 170th Air Refueling Squadron is a unit of the New Jersey Air National Guard's 108th Wing located on the McGuire AFB entity of Joint Base McGuire-Dix-Lakehurst, New Jersey. The squadron is equipped with the Boeing KC-46A Pegasus. The squadron, alongside the 141st Air Refueling Squadron, is an associate squadron of the active-duty 305th Air Mobility Wing.

== History ==
United States Congress, using the 2023 National Defense Authorization Act, directed the United States Air Force to divest the 108th Wing's Boeing KC-135R Stratotanker fleet and to replace the Air Force Reserve Command 76th and 78th Air Refueling Squadrons with the Air National Guard 141st and 170th Air Refueling Squadrons.

On 8 March 2024, the 170th Air Refueling Squadron was activated at Joint Base McGuire-Dix-Lakehurst, becoming the Air National Guard's newest unit. The squadron's numerical designation derives from the 170th Group, which was previously allotted to New Jersey between 1964 and 1993. It is equipped with the Boeing KC-46A Pegasus and operates alongside the 108th Wing's 141 ARS.

Both the 170th and 141st are "embedded classic associates" of the active-duty 2nd and 32nd Air Refueling Squadrons, meaning they share the 305th Air Mobility Wing's 24 KC-46As.

== Lineage ==
- Constituted as 170th Air Refueling Squadron on 7 March 2024

Activated on 8 March 2024

=== Assignments ===
- 108th Operations Group, 8 March 2024 – present

=== Stations ===
- Joint Base McGuire-Dix-Lakehurst, New Jersey, 8 March 2024 – present

=== Aircraft ===
- Boeing KC-46A Pegasus, 2024–present
