= Providence Airport =

- IATA: none; ICAO: none

Summary
- Operator: Private
- Location: Seekonk, Massachusetts
- Built: Unknown
- In use: 1929-Before 1954
- Occupants: Private
- Elevation AMSL: 28 ft / 9 m
- Coordinates: 41°46′51.45″N 71°18′14.87″W
- Interactive map of Providence Airport

Providence Airport was an airfield operational in the mid-20th century in Seekonk, Massachusetts.

== History ==
On July 21, 1927, aviator Charles Lindbergh visited Quonset, Rhode Island as the first stop on his national tour after his famous transatlantic flight. Lindbergh, a hugely popular figure, stressed the importance of building an airport to serve the Providence area.

In 1928, the Providence Airport Corporation was formed to build the city's first airport. World War I flying hero Clifton Badlam Thompson was chosen as the chief pilot, but Thompson died in an air crash before the airport was complete.

The field, located in Seekonk at Route 6 and what is now Industrial Way, featured two crossed, unpaved runways. Later, a single hangar was built, with the name “Providence Airport” painted on the roof.

Providence Airport was closed sometime between 1951 and 1954. At some point between 1963 and 1995 the land was built over as an industrial park, and no trace of the airport remained.
