= Neel E. Kearby =

United States Army Air Forces Medal of Honor recipient

Neel Ernest Kearby
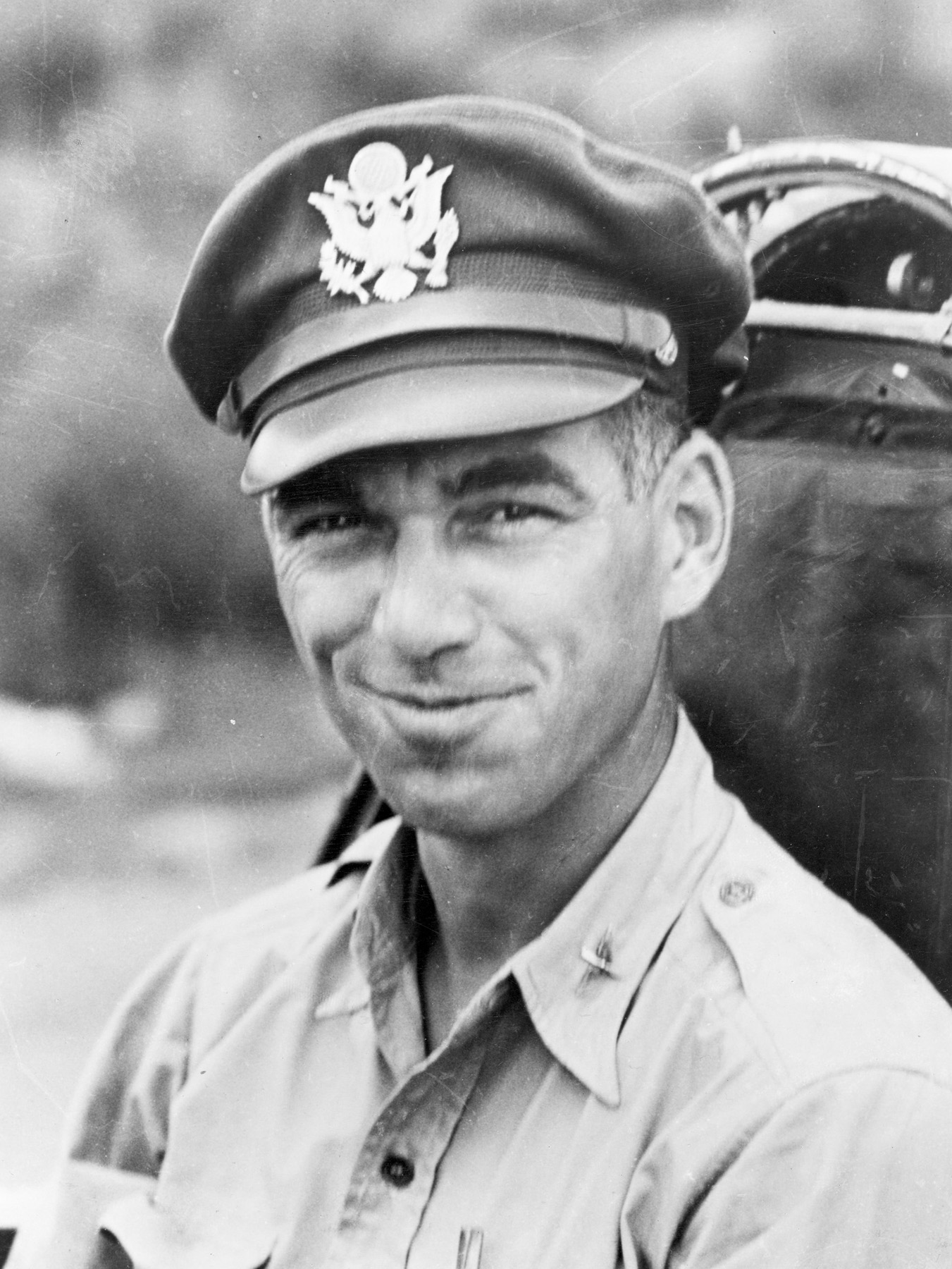
- Colonel Neel E. Kearby, c. 1943
- Born: June 5, 1911; Wichita Falls, Texas, U.S.
- Died: March 5, 1944 (aged 32); Wewak, Territory of New Guinea
- Burial place: Sparkman-Hillcrest Memorial Park Cemetery, Dallas, Texas, U.S.
- Relatives: Virginia Kearby (wife)
- Military career
- Allegiance: United States
- Branch: United States Army Air Corps; United States Army Air Forces
- Service years: 1937–1944
- Rank: Colonel
- Unit: 348th Fighter Group
- Commands: 14th Pursuit Squadron; 348th Fighter Group
- Conflicts: World War II
- Awards: Medal of Honor; Silver Star (2); Distinguished Flying Cross (4); Purple Heart; Air Medal (5)

Neel Ernest Kearby (June 5, 1911 – March 5, 1944) was a United States Army Air Forces colonel and P-47 Thunderbolt pilot in World War II who received the Medal of Honor for his actions in combat. Kearby is the first United States Army Air Forces fighter pilot to have received the Medal of Honor. He scored 22 aerial victories and was the top-scoring P-47 pilot in the Pacific Theater.

== Early life ==
Kearby was born in Wichita Falls, Texas, on June 5, 1911, to John Gallatin and Bessie Lee (Stone) Kearby. He graduated from Arlington High School in 1928, and graduated from the University of Texas at Arlington in 1936 (known then as North Texas Agricultural College) with a bachelor's degree in business administration.

== Military career ==
Kearby joined the Army Air Corps in 1937, and received flight training at Randolph and Kelly Air Fields.

=== World War II ===
Kearby then served with the 94th and 40th Pursuit Squadrons of the 1st Pursuit Group at Selfridge Field in Michigan, until December 1940. Kearby commanded the 14th Pursuit Squadron in the Panama Canal Zone from December 1940 to August 1942, where he flew P-39 Airacobras.

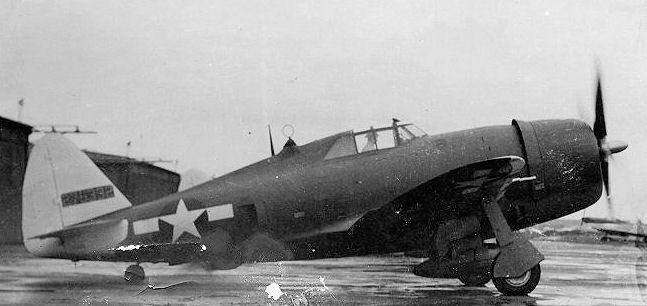
348th FG P-47 Thunderbolt

He was transferred in October 1942 to Westover Field in Massachusetts to take command of the new 348th Fighter Group with the rank of major. In June 1943, now a lieutenant colonel, Kearby arrived in Australia with his fighter group after months of training on the P-47 Thunderbolt.

The 348th used the P-47's flight characteristics to their advantage. They used their turbo supercharged engines to fly at high altitude to the target and dove on the Japanese planes before firing their eight .50-caliber machine guns on the lightly armored enemy aircraft.

Kearby opened his score on September 4, 1943, with a Mitsubishi G4M bomber and a Nakajima Ki-43, and followed this up ten days later by shooting down another twin-engined bomber, a Mitsubishi Ki-46. On September 23, he was promoted to full colonel.

He flew an aircraft bearing the name "Fiery Ginger". There were several planes with this title in the 358th Fighter Group at that time. All of Kearby's P-47D's—bore the names, "Fiery Ginger", "Fiery Ginger II", "Fiery Ginger III" and "Fiery Ginger IV". They were all named after his wife Virginia.

=== Medal of Honor mission ===
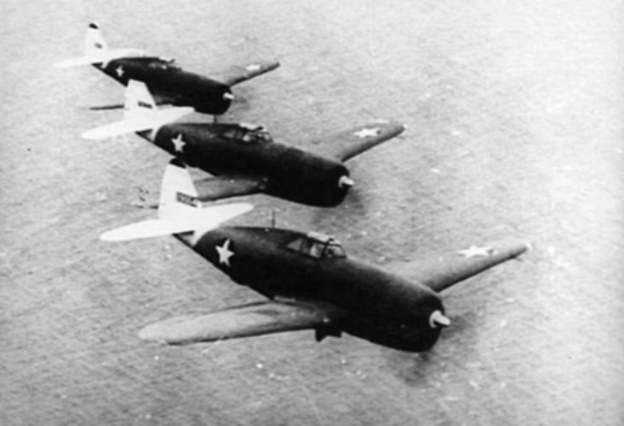
348th FG P-47s over New Guinea

On October 11, 1943, Kearby led four P-47s on a fighter sweep over the Japanese base at Wewak, and ran into 40 Japanese Army fighters. The ensuing combat lasted close to an hour, and when it was over, Kearby had shot down six enemy planes: four Nakajima Ki-43s and two Kawasaki Ki-61s.

Two other pilots had downed three Ki-61s between them for a total of nine Japanese fighters shot down without loss. This made Kearby the first P-47 ace of the Pacific Theater of Operations, and set a United States Army Air Forces record for most victories in a single mission.

Upon hearing of this aerial victory, General George Kenney, head of Fifth Air Force in the Pacific, recommended Kearby for the Medal of Honor, which was presented to him by General Douglas MacArthur himself in January 1944.

The American record for most victories in single mission is nine, set a year later by USN F6F Hellcat pilot, David McCampbell. Kearby's record was later broken within the United States Army Air Force as well, when P-51 Mustang pilot William Shomo downed seven Japanese planes in a six-minute fight over the Philippines in January 1945.

=== Post mission ===
In November 1943, with 12 victories to his credit, Kearby was transferred to the headquarters of the 5th Air Force Fighter Command. Despite his assignment to administrative duties, Kearby still wanted to be in combat. He flew missions whenever he could, and his victory tally continued to rise. For a time Kearby was in competition with Richard Bong to be the leading Army ace of the Pacific Theater. Like Kearby, Bong was not assigned to a combat unit at the time and flew in addition to his assigned duty of instructor in order to stay in combat.

During early March 1944, fighter pilots Bong and Thomas J. Lynch were close to breaking the American World War I record of 26 victories scored by pilot Eddie Rickenbacker. Hoping to break the record himself, Kearby hoped to score more victories to tie or break his record.

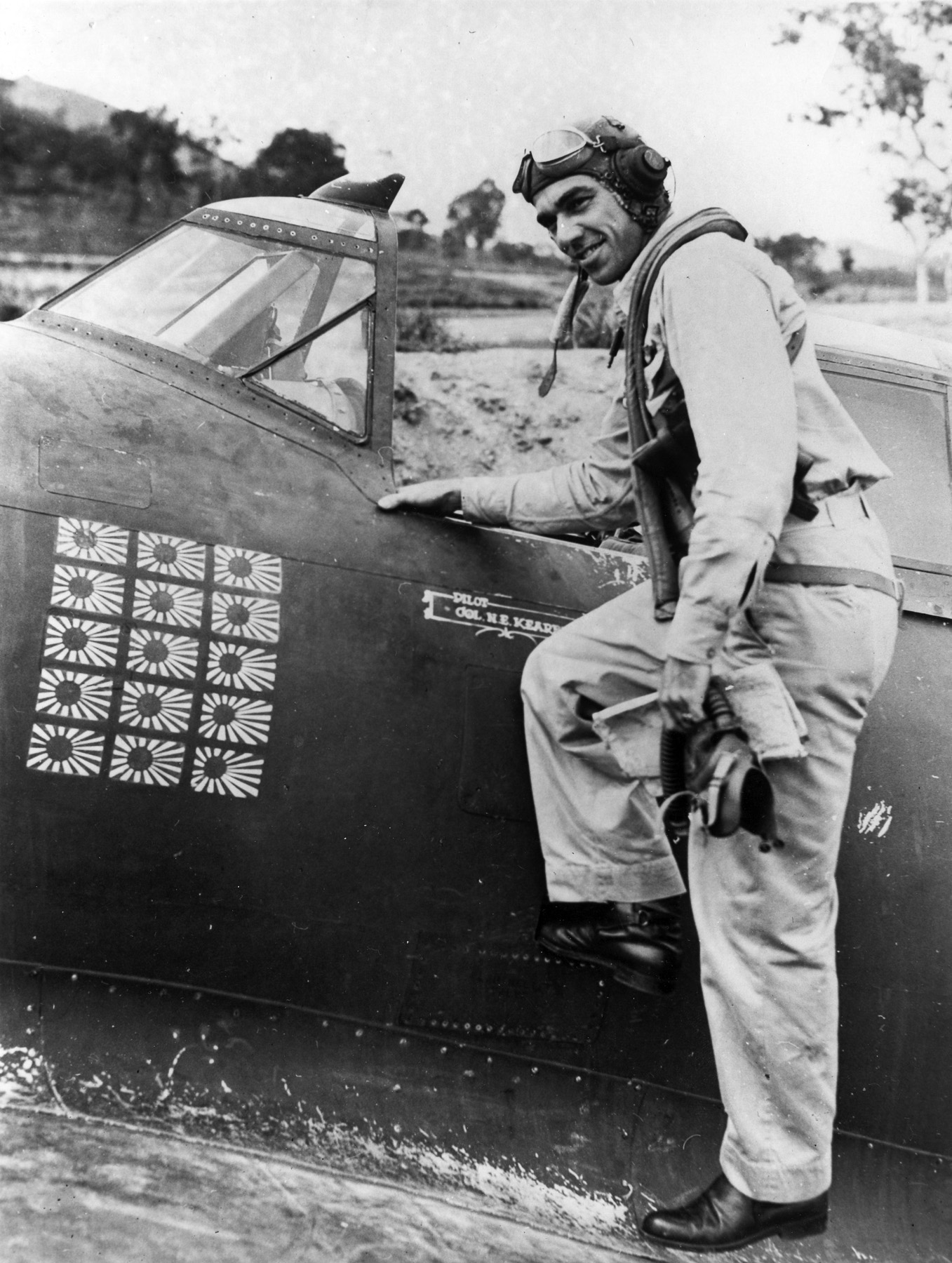
Kearby with his P-47 showing 15 "kills"

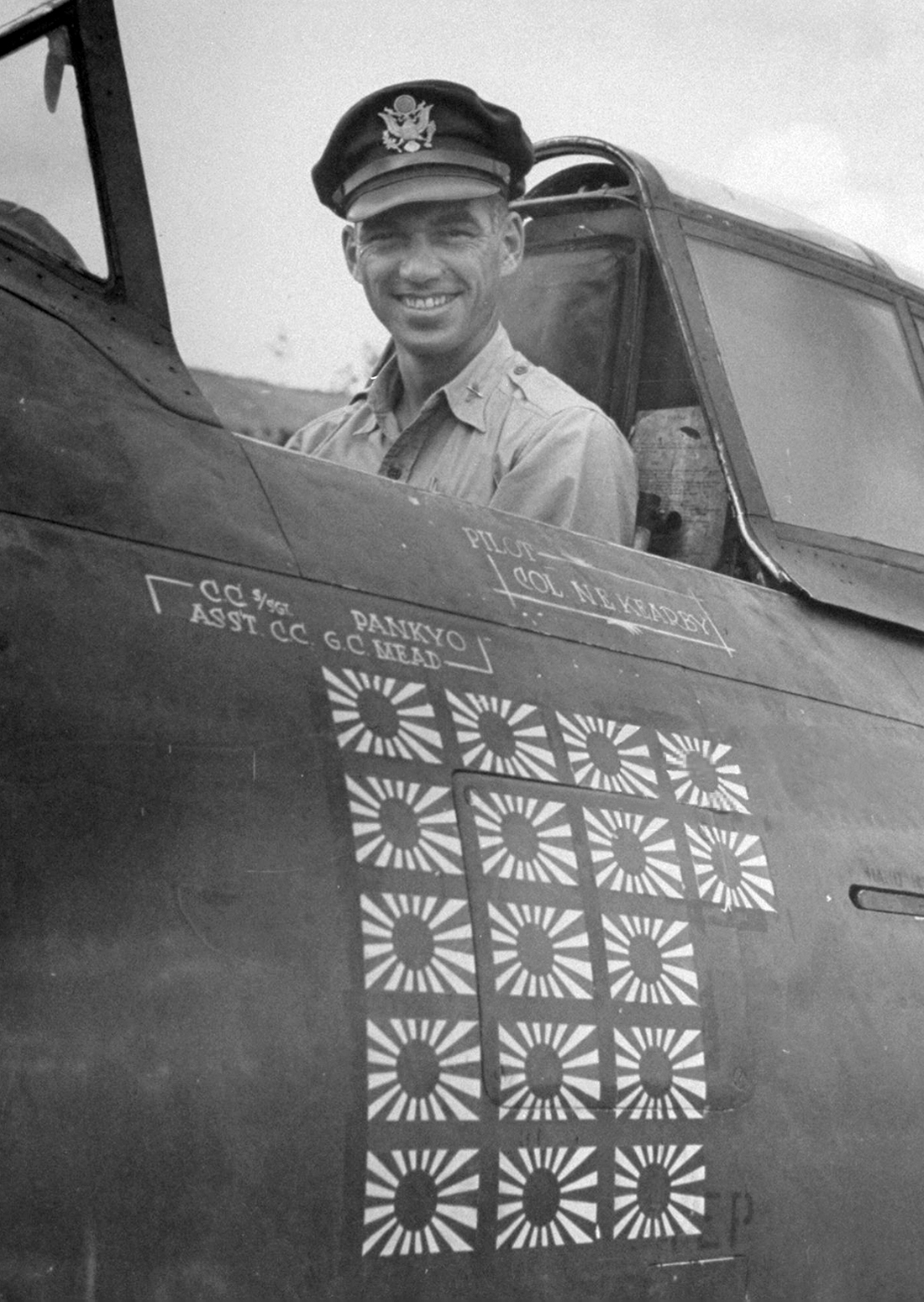
Kearby in February 1944

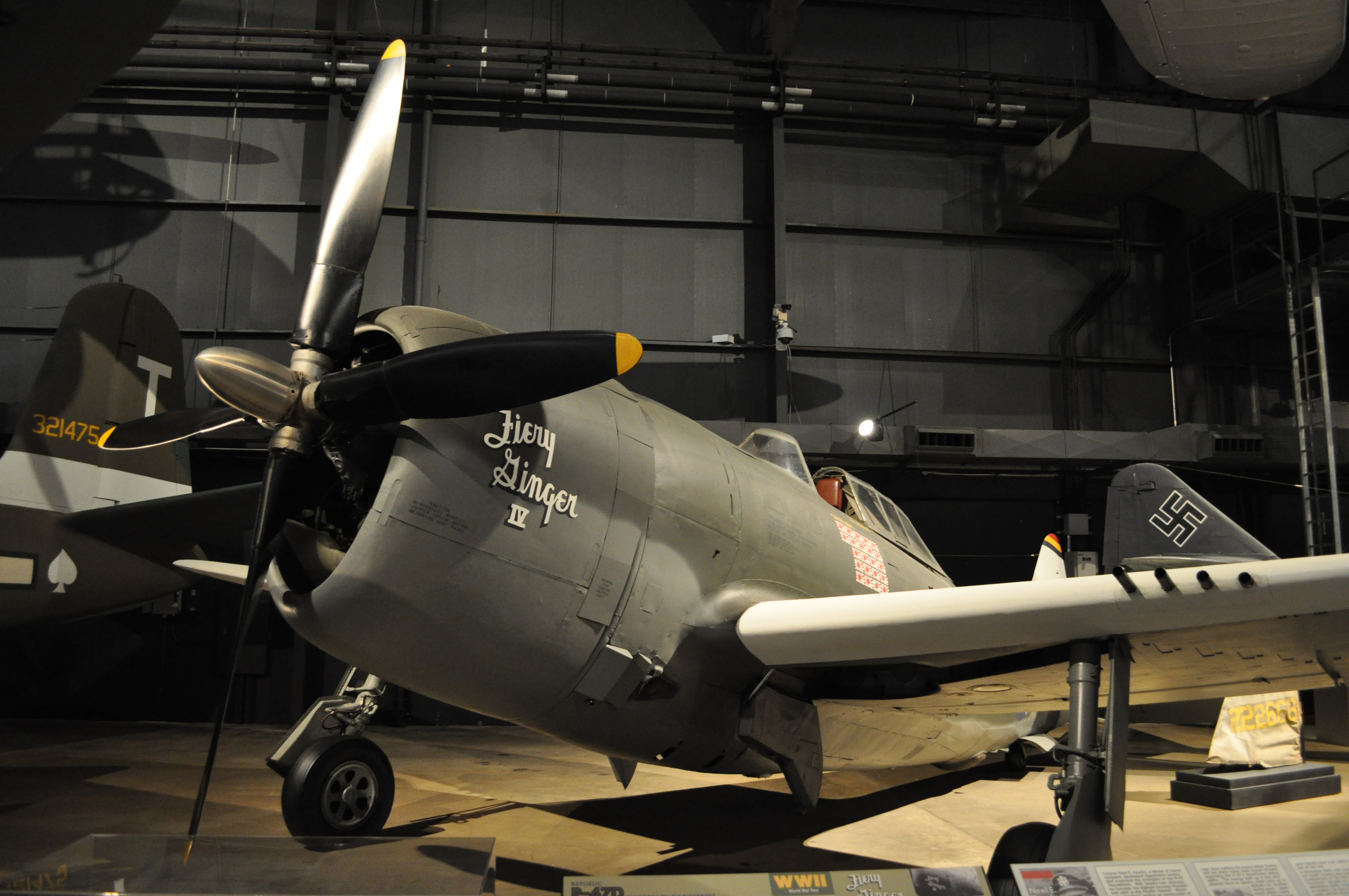
P-47 painted to appear as the plane flown by Kearby, at the National Museum of the United States Air Force. In the background under left wing can be seen original rudder from Kearby's P-47 wreck.

By March 1944, Kearby had 21 kills to his credit.

=== Death ===
On March 5, 1944, Kearby took off on a combat patrol with Captain William D. Dunham and Major Samuel Blair to search for Japanese aircraft. Flying his personal aircraft "Fiery Ginger IV" he proceeded towards the Tadji area. They spotted enemy aircraft over Wewak, and intercepted three Kawasaki Ki-48s of the 208th Sentai approaching Dagua Airfield.

Kearby opened fire on one aircraft, but did not observe it to go down and made a complete circle to attack it again. While performing this maneuver, he was attacked by a Nakajima Ki-43 from the 77th Sentai before wingman Dunham could shoot it down. Kearby's P-47 crashed into the jungle below. Afterwards, Dunham and Blair unsuccessfully searched for him until they ran short on fuel and returned to Saidor Airfield.

Kearby was observed by local people on the ground to have escaped by parachute and as he descended he became tangled in a tree and died of bullet wounds from the attack. His remains were found in 1947 by a Royal Australian Air Force search team, but they were not identified until two years later. He was buried in Sparkman-Hillcrest Memorial Park Cemetery in July 1949.

== Personal life ==
Kearby was married to Virginia Cochran, née Shoemaker (1919–1989). They had three children; Robert (1939–1974), John (1941–1977) and Kenneth (1942–1974). All of the children died in unrelated aircraft accidents.

== Medal of Honor citation ==
The citation for the Medal of Honor, which was awarded by General Douglas MacArthur, describes his combat heroism:

Place and date: Near Wewak, New Guinea, 11 October 1943. For conspicuous gallantry and intrepidity above and beyond the call of duty in action with the enemy, Col. Kearby volunteered to lead a flight of 4 fighters to reconnoiter the strongly defended enemy base at Wewak. Having observed enemy installations and reinforcements at 4 airfields, and secured important tactical information, he saw an enemy fighter below him, made a diving attack and shot it down in flames. The small formation then sighted approximately 12 enemy bombers accompanied by 36 fighters. Although his mission had been completed, his fuel was running low, and the numerical odds were 12 to 1, he gave the signal to attack. Diving into the midst of the enemy airplanes he shot down 3 in quick succession. Observing 1 of his comrades with 2 enemy fighters in pursuit, he destroyed both enemy aircraft. The enemy broke off in large numbers to make a multiple attack on his airplane but despite his peril he made one more pass before seeking cloud protection. Coming into the clear, he called his flight together and led them to a friendly base. Col. Kearby brought down 6 enemy aircraft in this action, undertaken with superb daring after his mission was completed.

== Legacy ==
Colonel Kearby was one of two U.S. fighter pilots to be awarded the Medal of Honor for actions while flying the P-47. The other was Raymond L. Knight.

In 1959, a building was named for him at Sheppard Air Force Base in Wichita Falls. The city of Alexandria, Louisiana, named a street for him near England Air Force Base. In 2010, the Texas Historical Commission and the City of Arlington, Texas, unveiled a historical marker and statue at the city's public library.

== Awards and decorations ==
Kearby's military decorations and awards include the following:

Badge	Army Air Forces Pilot Badge		
1st row	Medal of Honor	Silver Star with oak leaf cluster	Distinguished Flying Cross with three oak leaf clusters
2nd row	Purple Heart	Air Medal with four oak leaf clusters	American Defense Service Medal
3rd row	American Campaign Medal	Asiatic-Pacific Campaign Medal with six campaign stars	World War II Victory Medal
Unit awards	Presidential Unit Citation		

== Aerial victory credits ==
Chronicle of aerial victories
Date	#	Type	Location	Aircraft flown	Unit Assigned
September 4, 1943	1; 1	Mitsubishi G4M; Nakajima Ki-43	Hopoi, New Guinea	P-47D Thunderbolt	348th FG
September 14, 1943	1	Mitsubishi Ki-46	Malahang, New Guinea	P-47D	348th FG
October 11, 1943	4; 2	Nakajima Ki-43; Kawasaki Ki-61	Wewak, New Guinea	P-47D	348th FG
October 16, 1943	1	Mitsubishi A6M	Wewak, New Guinea	P-47D	348th FG
October 19, 1943	2	Mitsubishi F1M	Wewak, New Guinea	P-47D	348th FG
December 3, 1943	3	Nakajima Ki-43	Wewak, New Guinea	P-47D	348th FG
December 22, 1943	1	Nakajima Ki-43	Wewak, New Guinea	P-47D	348th FG
December 23, 1943	1	Kawasaki Ki-61	Wewak, New Guinea	P-47D	348th FG
January 3, 1944	1; 1	Mitsubishi Ki-21; Nakajima Ki-43	Wewak, New Guinea	P-47D	348th FG
January 9, 1944	2	Kawasaki Ki-61	Wewak, New Guinea	P-47D	348th FG
March 5, 1944	1	Kawasaki Ki-48	Wewak, New Guinea	P-47D	348th FG

SOURCES: Air Force Historical Study 85: USAF Credits for the Destruction of Enemy Aircraft, World War II

== See also ==
- List of Medal of Honor recipients for World War II § K
