= Raleigh, West Virginia =

- Unincorporated community
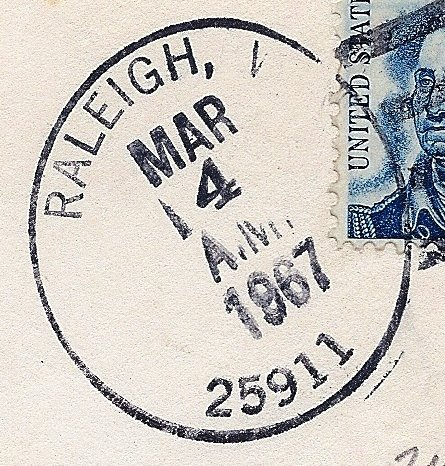
- Postmark from Raleigh, West Virginia

- Location within West Virginia Location within the United States
- Coordinates: 37°45′27″N 81°10′11″W
- Country: United States
- State: West Virginia
- County: Raleigh
- Elevation: 2,120 ft (650 m)
- Time zone: UTC-5 (Eastern (EST))
  - Summer (DST): UTC-4 (EDT)
- ZIP code: 25911
- Area codes: 304 & 681
- GNIS feature ID: 2807507

Raleigh is an unincorporated community and coal town in Raleigh County, West Virginia, United States. Raleigh is 1.5 miles (2.4 km) southeast of downtown Beckley. Raleigh has a post office with ZIP code 25911.

The community was named for its location within Raleigh County. The Raleigh Coal and Coke Company was the primary mining company within this location.

== Notable person ==
- Lonnie Warwick, American football player, was born in Raleigh.

== Gallery ==
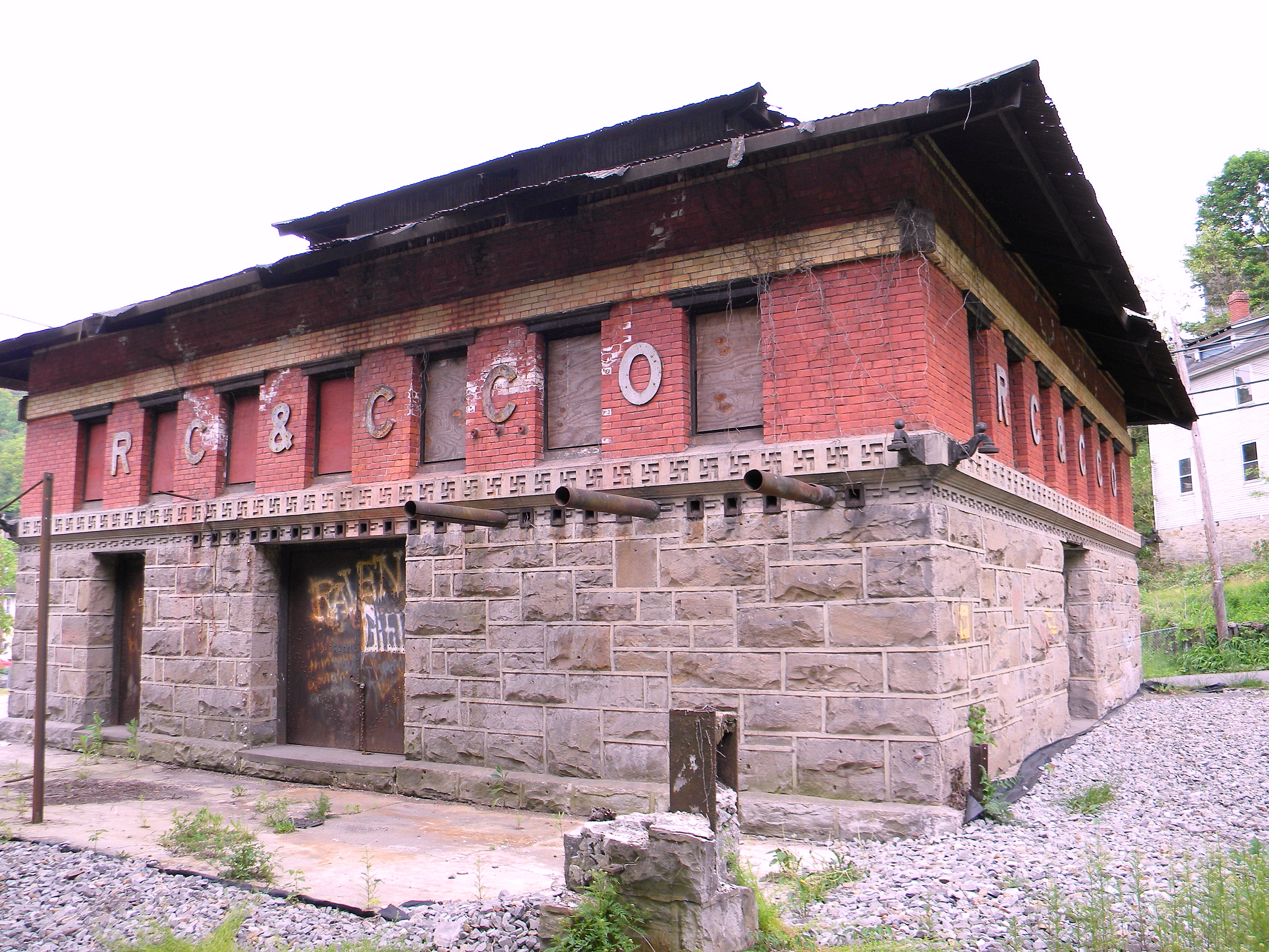
Raleigh Coal and Coke Company power building
