= 486th Flight Test Squadron =

US Air Force unit

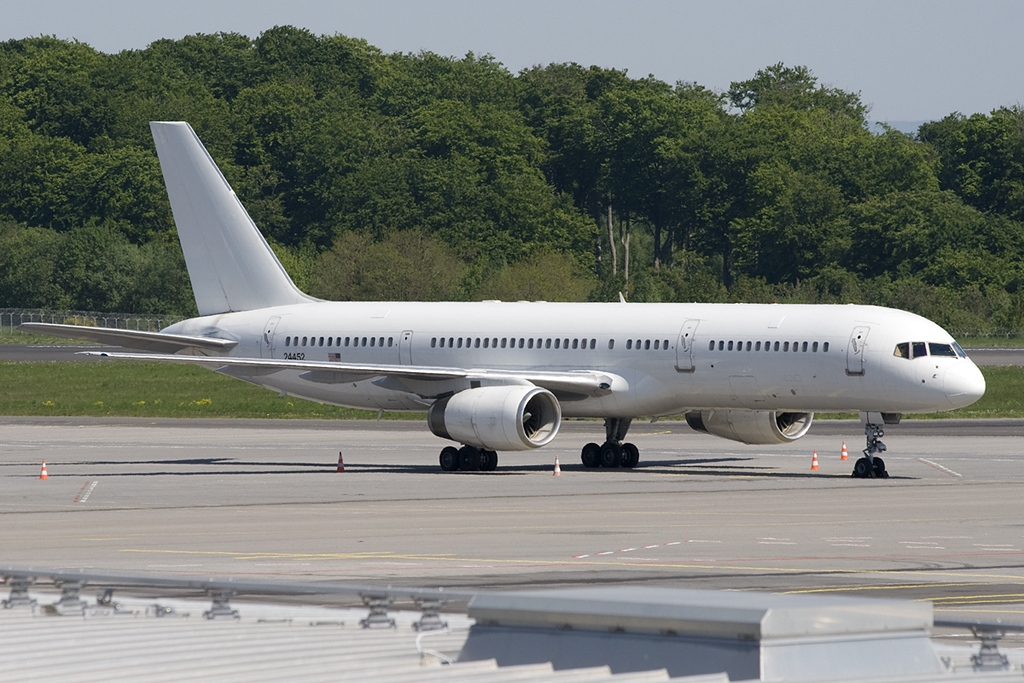
- Boeing C-32B 24452 parked at Luxembourg Airport during May 2008.
- Active: 1995–present
- Country: United States
- Branch: United States Air Force
- Type: Flying squadron
- Role: Special operations
- Size: Two aircraft
- Home base: Eglin AFB, Florida
- Motto(s): Non semper ea sunt quae videntur (Latin: Not always what they seem)

Insignia
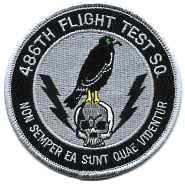
- 486th Test Flight Squadron emblem

Aircraft flown
- Transport: Boeing C-32B Gatekeeper

The 486th Flight Test Squadron is a secretive United States Air Force unit with a misleading designation, assigned to Eglin Air Force Base, Florida, which is associated with activities of the U.S. State Department Foreign Emergency Support Team and Central Intelligence Agency Special Activities Center. The squadron motto is "Non semper ea sunt quae videntur" which translates as "Not always what they seem". It is currently assigned to the 96th Test Wing, and operates a pair of Boeing C-32B Gatekeeper aircraft, on stand-by alert for special operations and intelligence missions world-wide. Official documents make it clear that operations fall under the aegis of Air Force Special Operations Command. Of the two C-32B craft in existence, the 486th appears to fly the more clandestine craft, or on more clandestine missions, as the other operator of the C-32B, the 150th Special Operations Squadron of the New Jersey Air National Guard, denies the existence of a second aircraft and makes no mention of the 486th in public or internal documentation.

== Operations ==
The 486th Flight Test Squadron was activated by 1995. One former employee describes it as a "classified unit" and "a selectively manned, one-of-a-kind unit." Very little is officially acknowledged about the classified missions of the 486th Flight Test Squadron, which is, in fact, not a test unit at all, but a quick-reaction transportation operation utilized by the Federal Emergency Management Agency, the Domestic Emergency Support Team, and the Foreign Emergency Support Team to respond to terrorist incidents worldwide. The aircraft may also be utilized in conjunction with the Special Activities Division of the Central Intelligence Agency.

The vast Eglin complex is also home to the headquarters of Air Force Special Operations Command at Hurlburt Field, as well as the United States Army's 7th Special Forces Group, which relocated from Fort Bragg, North Carolina, in 2011.

== Equipment ==
- Boeing C-32B Gatekeeper – 2

== See also ==
- List of United States Air Force test squadrons
- Foreign Emergency Support Team
- Special Activities Division
