= Foreign Emergency Support Team =

US government taskforce

Agency overview
- Formed: 1986
- Type: Interagency Task Force
- Headquarters: Harry S. Truman Building, Washington, D.C.
- Parent department: U.S. Department of State
- Parent agency: Bureau of Diplomatic Security
- Website: https://www.state.gov/foreign-emergency-support-team/

The Foreign Emergency Support Team (FEST) is an interagency task force of the United States government, tasked with on-call short-notice responses to terrorist incidents across the world. It consists of personnel from military, intelligence, and diplomatic agencies, as well as other departments when required.

== History ==
The FEST was created in 1986, and has long remained shrouded in mystery. It has deployed over thirty times to critical situations around the world since its inception. The team maintains the capability to deploy within hours to advise and assist the U.S. chief of mission coordinating U.S. government crisis response activities and to augment embassy operations.

The Diplomatic Security Service leads the FEST, and it includes representatives from the U.S. Department of State, Department of Defense, the intelligence community, and the Federal Bureau of Investigation, and other appropriate agencies, such as the Department of Energy, as circumstances warrant. FEST composition is flexible and tailored to the specific incident and U.S. embassy needs. The FEST provides specialized crisis response expertise to augment existing U.S. Mission and host government capabilities. In addition to terrorism, the unit specializes in responding to Weapons of Mass Destruction and CBRNE events.

FEST is the counterpart of the Domestic Emergency Support Team (DEST) which serves a similar role for crises within the United States.

== Activity ==
=== U.S. Embassy Bombings ===
The FEST was particularly active when operatives of Osama bin Laden's al-Qaeda network bombed U.S. embassies in Kenya and Tanzania.

USS Cole bombing

A FEST was deployed to Aden, Yemen following a terrorist attack against the USS Cole, which killed 17 American sailors in October 2000. The FEST advised the US ambassador and helped her direct America's response to the attack. The team relied heavily on FEST's secure mobile communications capability, since the Port of Aden is more than 200 miles from the American Embassy in Sanaa.

=== Beirut Port Explosion ===
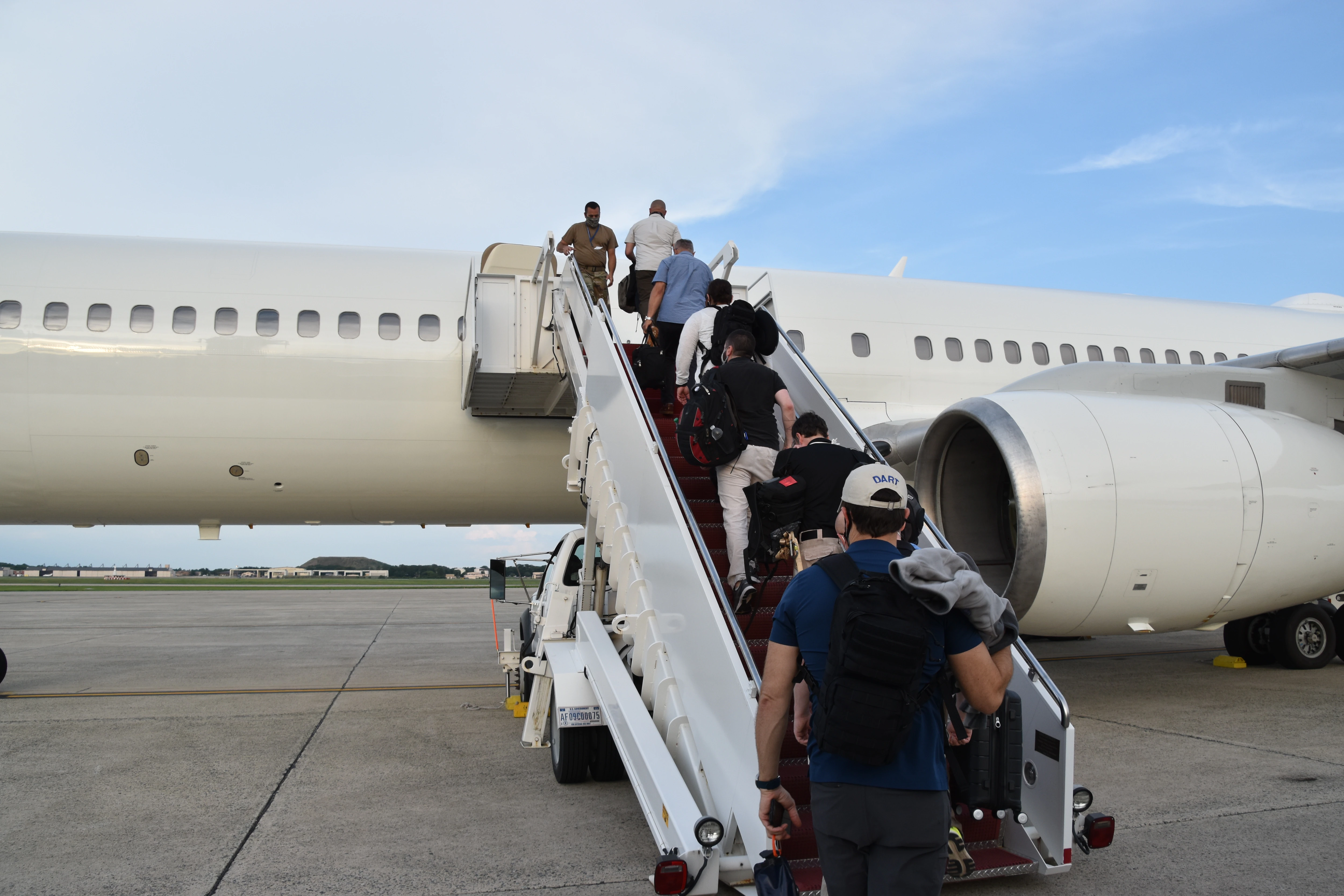
Members of the FEST board a C-32B at Andrews Air Force Base en route to Lebanon following the Beirut explosion.

On August 7, 2020, the FEST deployed from Andrews Air Force Base to Beirut, Lebanon, to lend support to the U.S. Embassy in Beirut as part of the U.S. government’s response following what was later discovered to be an ammonium nitrate fire which caused one of the largest artificial non-nuclear explosions in human history in the city's port. The blast on August 4 had ripped through the port of Beirut, causing extensive injuries and damage throughout the surrounding area. Shortly after the blast, the U.S. Embassy in Beirut requested support from the DSS-led FEST to help coordinate interagency support for emergency response, restoration of essential services, and public health and safety protection.

=== Training ===
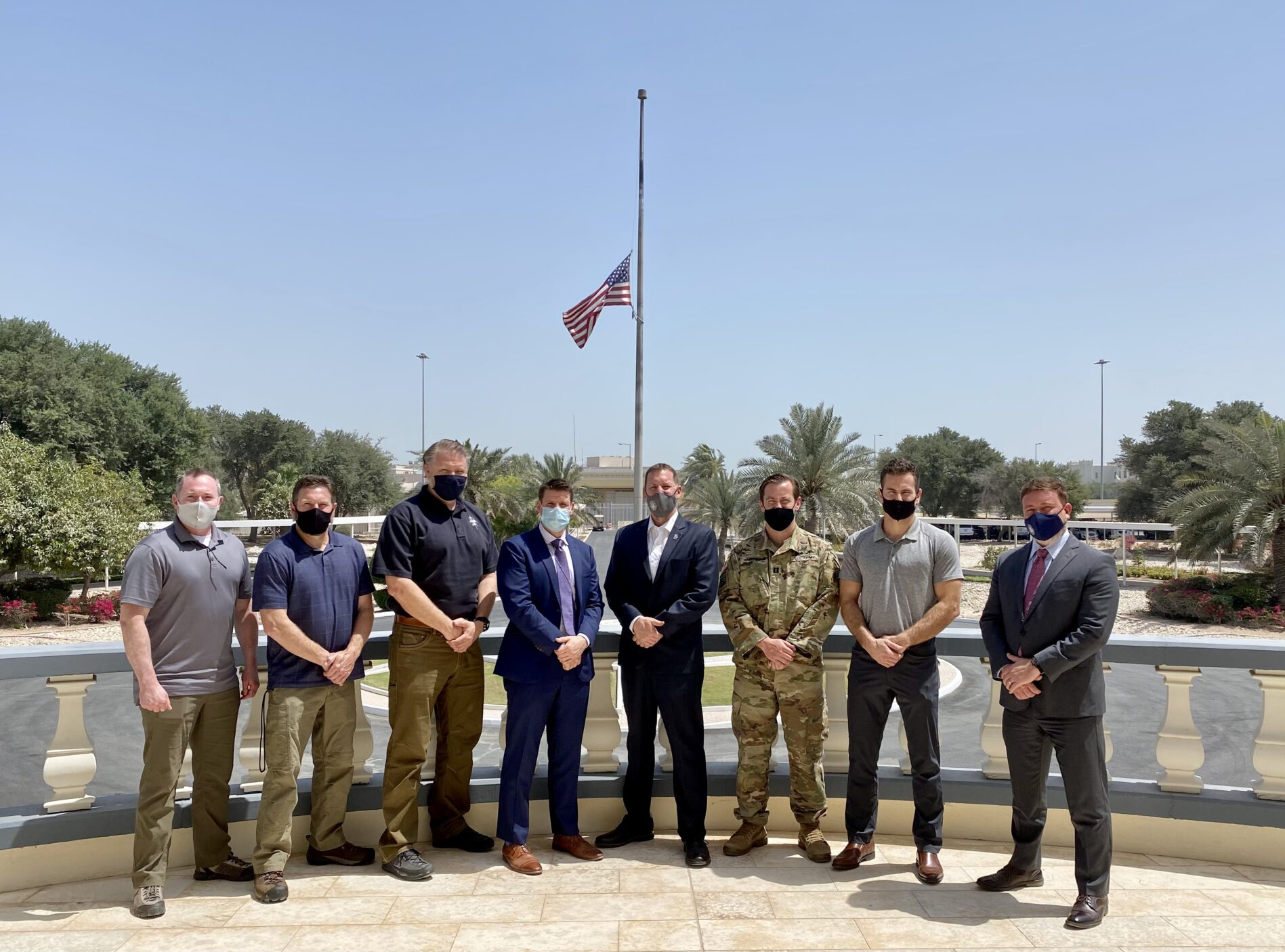
Members of the FEST at the U.S. Embassy, Doha, Qatar

==== Invincible Sentry 21 ====
In March 2021, members of the FEST participated in a five-day military crisis response exercise between Qatari and U.S. military forces in Doha, Qatar. Exercise Invincible Sentry 2021 (IS 21) is an annual U.S. Central Command training event, hosted this year by the government of Qatar. IS 21 included close coordination and training with the Qatar’s Ministry of Defense, the U.S. Embassy Doha, and other U.S. government entities.

=== Contingency teams ===
"Contingency" FESTs were deployed to ensure safety at the Olympic Games in Athens, Greece (Summer 2004) and Turin, Italy (Winter 2006), and in Lagos, Nigeria during a hostage-taking crisis.

=== Smaller deployments ===
The team has been spotted flying into Iraq, throughout central Europe, and several times in Amman, Jordan. Team constituent agencies organize a FEST to conduct training with partner nations often.

Smaller, "tailored" FESTs have responded to abductions of Americans in Ecuador and the Philippines.

== Composition ==
Organizations and units which commonly comprise the FEST:

- Department of State
  - Diplomatic Security (lead bureau)
  - Bureau of Global Public Affairs
  - Bureau of Consular Affairs
  - Bureau of International Security and Non-Proliferation
  - Bureau of Operational Medicine
  - Bureau of Counterterrorism and Countering Violent Extremism
- Department of Defense
  - Army Reserve Counter Terrorism Unit
  - Other military units as appropriate
- Federal Bureau of Investigation
- Department of Health and Human Services
- Department of Energy
- United States Agency for International Development
  - Bureau of Humanitarian Affairs
- U.S. Intelligence Community
- Other federal agencies as appropriate

== Equipment ==
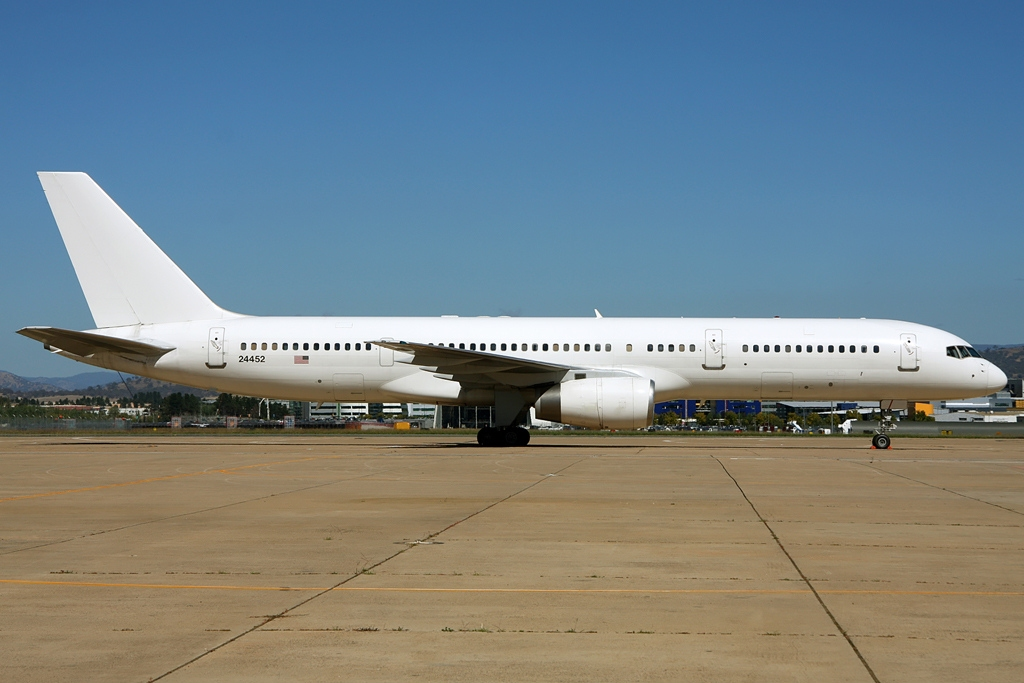
Boeing C-32B of the 486th Flight Test Squadron in Canberra, Australia in 2008.

=== Boeing C-32B ===
- The FEST is a primary user of the specialized Boeing C-32B transport aircraft, shared with the CIA, and operated by the New Jersey Air National Guard's 150th Special Operations Squadron and Air Force Special Operations Command's 486th Flight Test Squadron.

== See also ==
- Domestic Emergency Support Team
- Nuclear Emergency Support Team
- Diplomatic Security Service
