= Army Reserve Counter Terrorism Unit =

- Active: Unknown–present
- Country: United States
- Branch: United States Army
- Type: Military intelligence
- Role: Counterterrorism
- Part of: National Intelligence Support Group, Military Intelligence Readiness Command, also United States Department of State
- Headquarters: SA-4E Navy Hill, Washington, D.C., United States
- Nickname: ARCU

Insignia
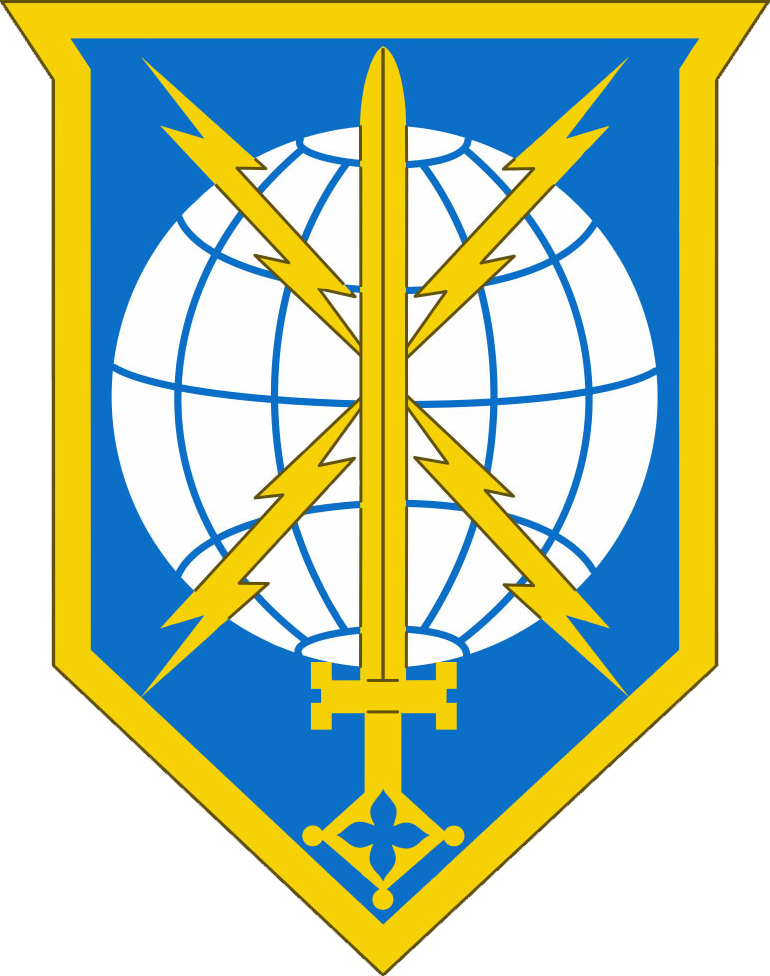
- Military Intelligence Readiness Command shoulder sleeve insignia

The United States Army Reserve Counter Terrorism Unit (ARCU or AR-CTU) is a unit under the combined authority of the Army and the U.S. Department of State which prevents and responds to terrorist attacks while all under forward control of the National Command Authority in coordination with Joint Special Operations Command (JSOC). The unit is under day-to-day operational control of the civilian State Department Bureau of Counterterrorism (S/CT). The unit's primary mission is its role as a senior member of the Foreign Emergency Support Team. As part of the FEST, the unit must be ready to deploy on three hours notice as part of an ultra-long range airlift to respond to terrorist attacks anywhere on earth. Within the Army, the unit is organized under the National Intelligence Support Group of Military Intelligence Readiness Command, the Army Reserve's functional command for military intelligence. Little is known of the unit, which is responsible for supporting Department of State counterterrorism policies, plans, programs, operations, exercises, training, and activities both in the National Capital Region and around the world. ARCU primarily supports the Coordinator for Counterterrorism and serves to assist diplomats, advising, assisting, and assessing the U.S. whole-of-government national counterterrorism response to overseas terrorist incidents while helping to synchronize American Diplomatic, Information, Military, Economic, Financial, Intelligence and Law Enforcement (DIMEFIL) assets in response. The unit works to forge partnerships with various intelligence agencies, non-state actors, multilateral organizations, and foreign governments to advance counterterrorism objectives, assisting in developing coordinated strategies to defeat terrorists abroad and securing the cooperation of international partners.

The unit is headquartered at the Potomac Annex on Navy Hill, across the street from the State Department headquarters in the Harry S Truman Building in Washington, D.C. Command of the unit is a Colonel's billet.

== List of commanders ==
No.	Portrait	Rank and name	Assumed command	Relinquished command
		COL Robert Appleby	March 2010	January 2013
		COL B. Tripp Bowles III	January 2013	July 2015
		[CLASSIFIED]	July 2015	unknown
		[CLASSIFIED]	unknown	Incumbent
