= COMCO =

COMCO may refer to:

- Comco, de facto name of an American airline operating two Boeing 757 aircraft
- Comco Ikarus, German aircraft manufacturer
- Competition Commission of the Swiss Federal Department of Economic Affairs, Education and Research
- COMCO Cash Spiel

== See also ==
- Comcom (disambiguation)
