= Boeing C-32 =

Executive transport aircraft by Boeing

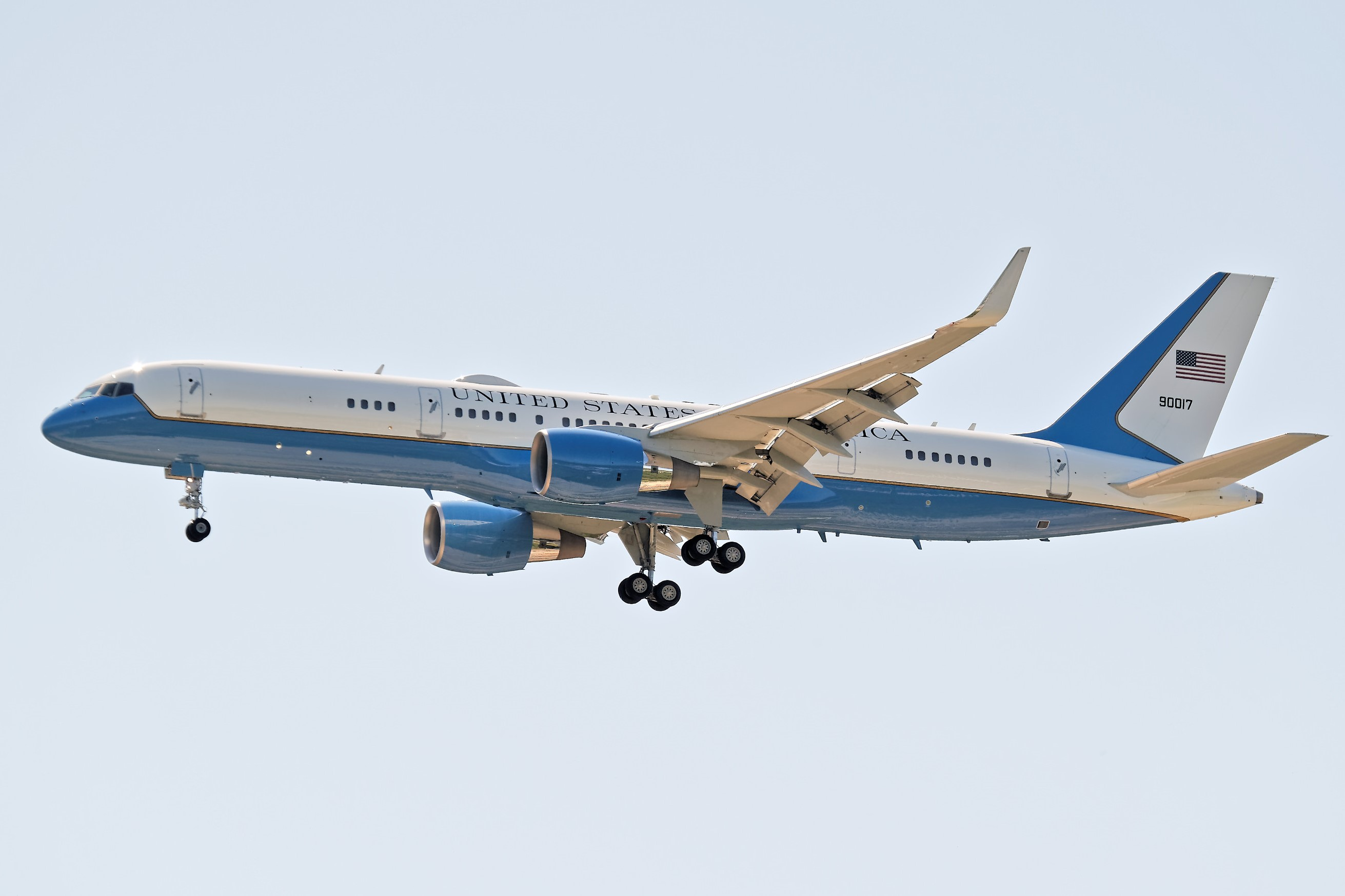

General information
- Type: VIP transport, special operations
- National origin: United States
- Manufacturer: Boeing
- Status: In service
- Primary user: United States Air Force
- Number built: C-32A: 8 (4 acknowledged); C-32B: 2

History
- Introduction date: June 1998
- Developed from: Boeing 757

The Boeing C-32 is the United States Air Force designation for variants of the Boeing 757 in military service. Two variants exist, filling different parts of the military passenger transport role. The C-32A serves the Special Air Mission, providing executive transport and broad communications capabilities to senior political officials, while the C-32B Gatekeeper provides clandestine airlift to special operations and global emergency response efforts, a role known as "covered air."

The primary users of the C-32A are the vice president of the United States (using the call sign "Air Force Two" when aboard), the first lady, and the secretary of state. On occasion, other members of the president's cabinet and members of Congress have flown aboard the C-32A. The aircraft also occasionally serves as Air Force One in place of the larger VC-25A for a variety of reasons, including flying into smaller airports domestically or when the larger aircraft is not needed.

Less is known of the activities of C-32B, whose existence is not widely promoted by the Air Force. The B models are former commercial Boeing 757 aircraft used for global airlift and government crisis-response needs. The modified aircraft were acquired to support the U.S. State Department's Foreign Emergency Support Team, and have ties to special operations and the U.S. Intelligence Community.

The C-32 replaced the C-137 Stratoliner, achieving double the range yet able to land on shorter runways than that aircraft. The C-137 was based on the Boeing 707, and had been in service several decades.

== C-32A ==
=== Development ===
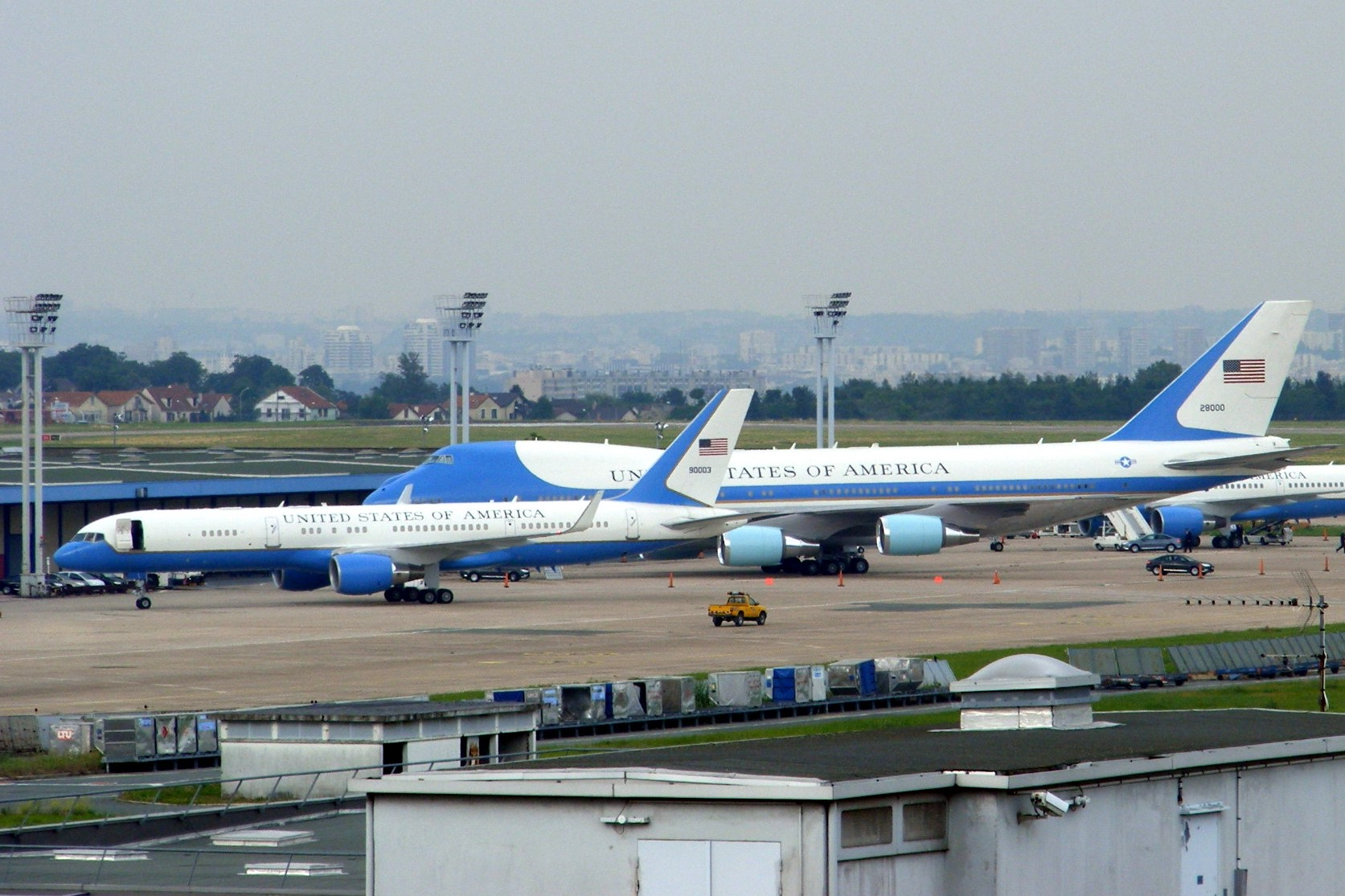
A C-32A to the left of a larger VC‑25A at Paris-Orly Airport, 2009

The C-32A is the military designation for the Boeing 757-2G4, a variant of the Boeing 757-200 mid-size, narrow-body twin-engine jet airliner. The 757-2G4 has been modified for government VIP transport use, including a change to a 45-passenger interior and military avionics. A contract was awarded in August 1996 for four aircraft, which along with the smaller C-37A and later C-40 Clipper, would replace the aging fleet of VC-137 aircraft. The first plane was delivered to the 89th Airlift Wing at Andrews Air Force Base, Maryland, in late June 1998. More aircraft were acquired later.

=== Equipment and capabilities ===
The C-32As are painted in the blue and white livery, vertical stabilizer flag, and prominent "UNITED STATES OF AMERICA" cheatline markings developed by Raymond Loewy at the behest of President Kennedy for use on Air Force One. The design is shared with most Special Air Mission aircraft. All of the C-32As have Pratt & Whitney PW2000 engines and winglets for added fuel economy.

==== Appearance upgrades ====
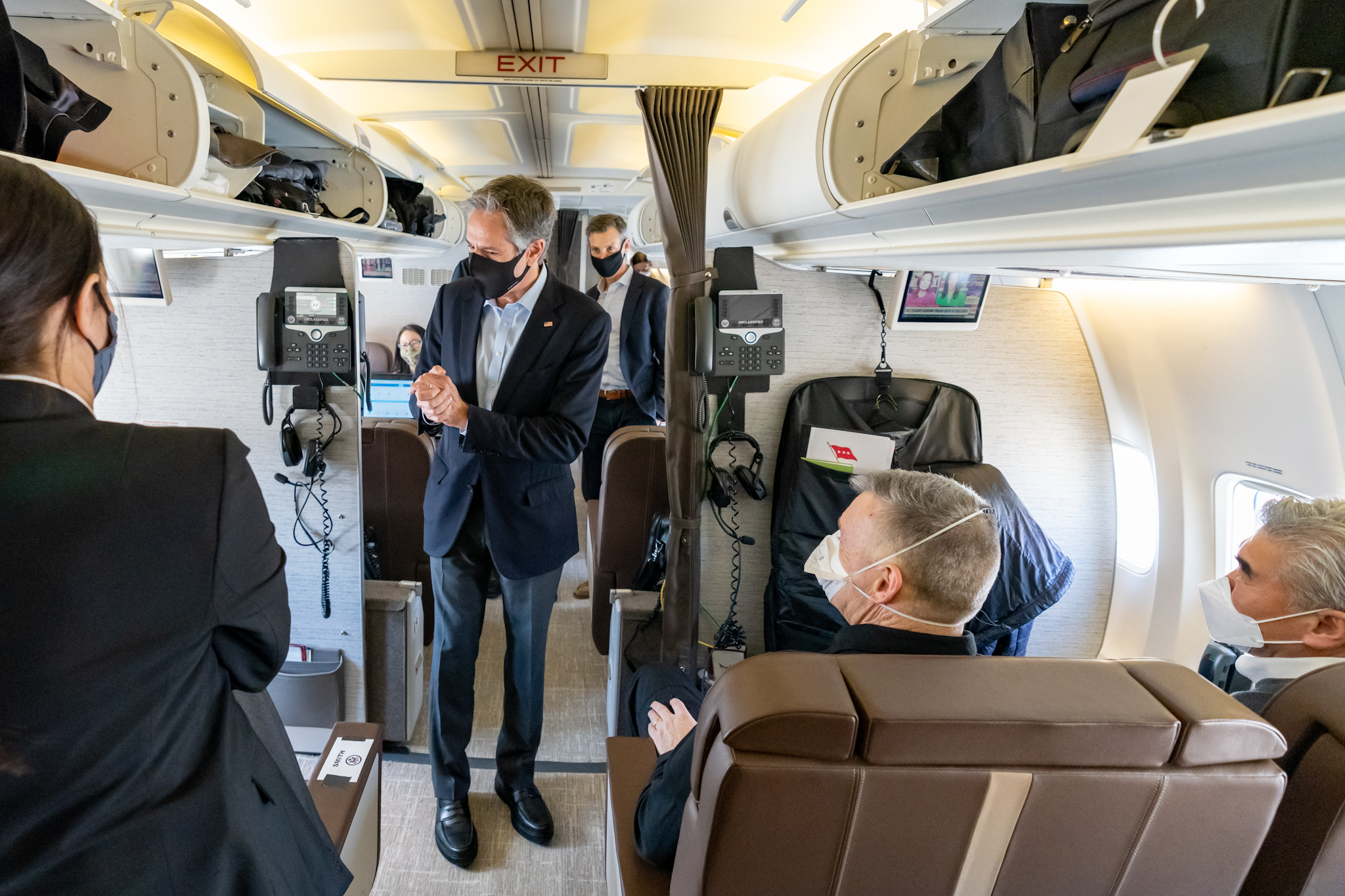
Secretary of State Antony Blinken aboard an upgraded C-32A in 2021

Throughout the Obama, Trump, and Biden administrations, the interiors of the C-32As were slowly refitted with more luxurious accommodations, at a cost of $16 million per aircraft. Officially, the work was requested by the Air Force, and is being completed by a division of Boeing at Air Force facilities in Oklahoma. The retrofit includes upgraded and refurbished interior elements throughout, new carpets, lighting, leather seats and wood tables in place of cloth and formica, a complete painting and cleaning, and the replacement of the double-seat configuration with a triple-seat configuration, aft of door 3. The refit is controversial, with critics describing the spending as "posh" and "wasteful" and an effort to create "flying palaces," noting that the aircraft are well into the back half of their service lives. The War Zone observed that the spending appears to have little to do with the ability of the aircraft to accomplish its mission, noting that the C-32As have been continuously upgraded with improved communications, avionics, and countermeasures throughout their service lives without criticism. Beginning in 2025 during Trump's second term, the presidential airfleet, VC-25B, C-32A and G770s, were repainted in Trump's preferred red, white, and blue American flag livery featuring a waving flag on the tailplane.

=== Operational history ===
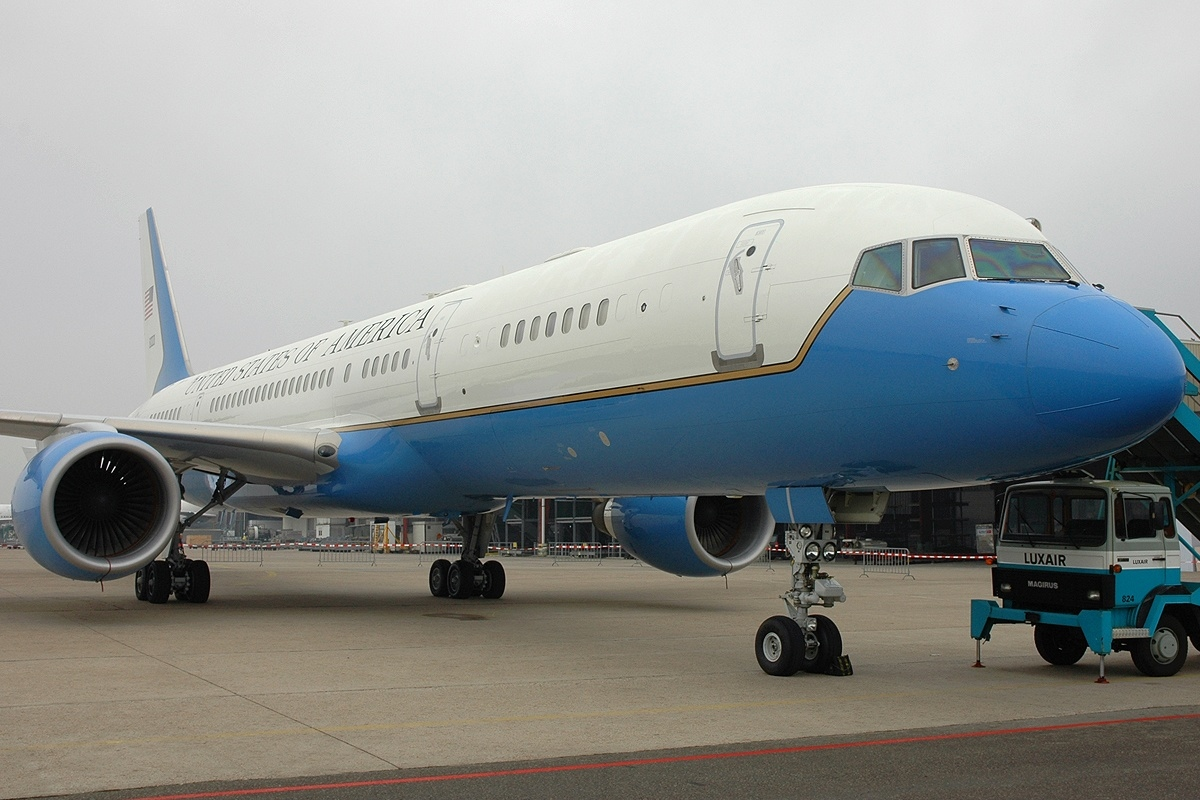
C-32A at airport terminal in 2005

The C-32As are operated by the 1st Airlift Squadron of the 89th Airlift Wing. They are available for use by the vice-president (using call sign Air Force Two), the first lady, and members of the cabinet and Congress (using SAM callsigns).

The aircraft also occasionally serves as Air Force One in place of the larger VC-25A when the president is traveling to domestic destinations that cannot accommodate the larger Boeing 747-derived presidential plane or if the latter is simply unavailable, or, as in President Joe Biden's February 2023 trip to Ukraine and President Donald Trump's July 2026 trip to Turkey, to throw off would-be threats.

==== Incidents ====
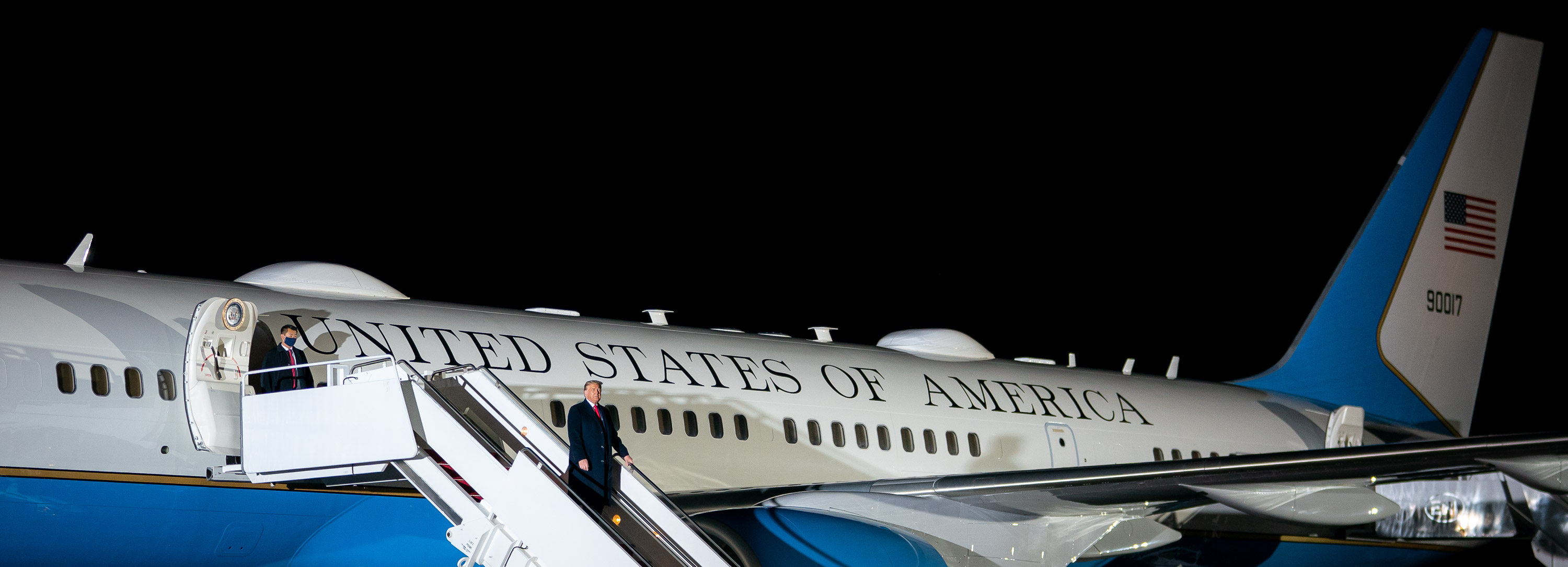
Antennae and fairings fitted atop the C-32A in 2019

Several C-32As have suffered non-life-threatening equipment failures during VIP flight operations which led to aircraft returning to Andrews Air Force Base prematurely. In 2018, First Lady Melania Trump and Health and Human Services Secretary Alex Azar were aboard a C-32A flying to Philadelphia when smoke filled the cabin shortly after takeoff. Journalists aboard reported being given wet towels to shield their faces from the smoke, and the flight returned to Andrews without further incident. In 2021, Vice President Kamala Harris was aboard a C-32A en route to Guatemala when the aircraft was forced to make an emergency return to Andrews over an unspecified equipment failure which delayed the trip but left all passengers and crew unharmed.

=== Replacement ===
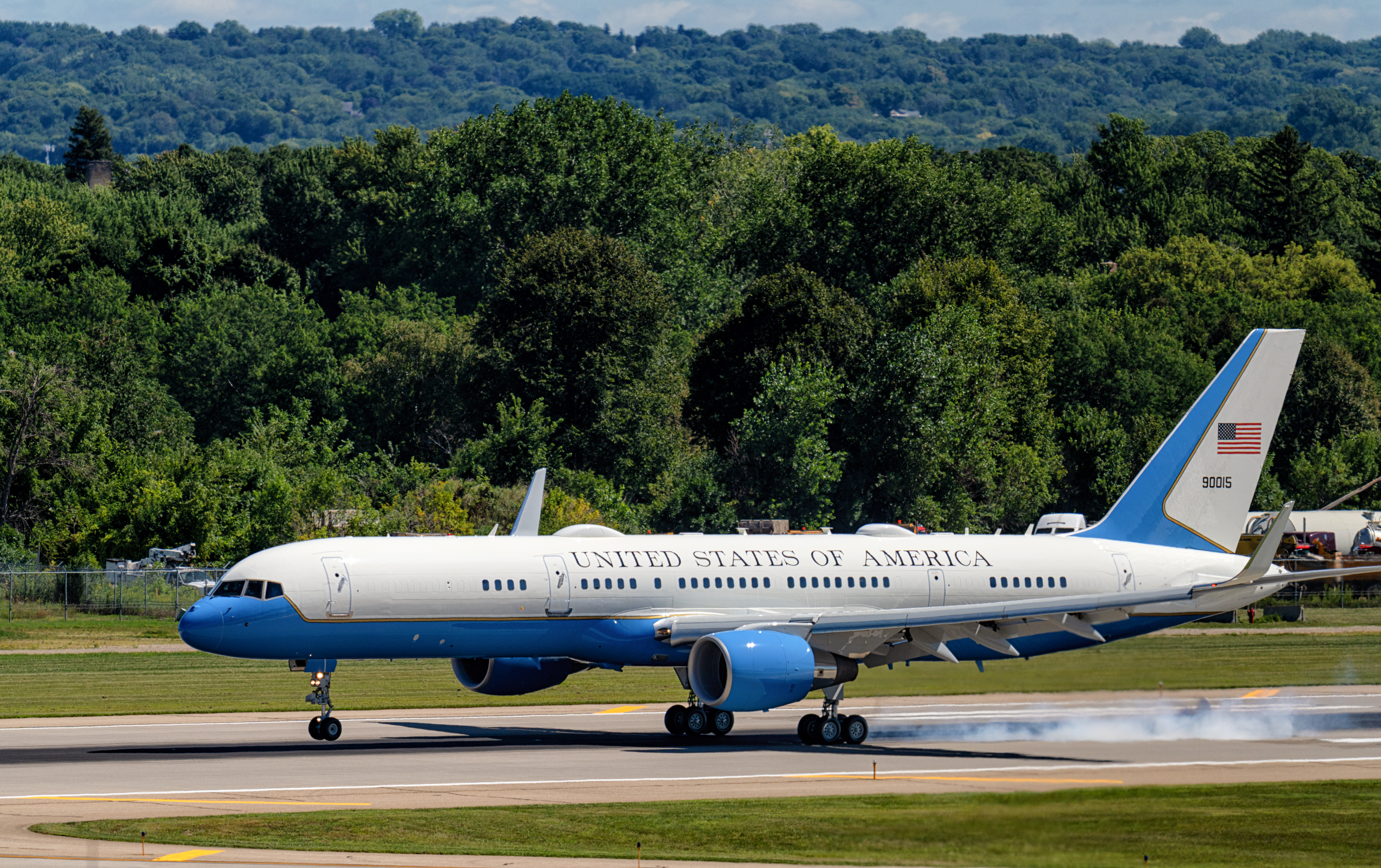
A Boeing C-32 is Air Force One as it lands with President Trump in 2020

The Trump administration included $6 million (~$7.57 million in 2025) in its 2018 federal budget proposal to study replacements for the aging C-32A. In June 2021, Pentagon leaders in the Biden administration cut funding for the study from its fiscal 2022 budget request. Instead, the Air Force redirected the nominal amount of funding to research and development contracts for three American startup companies: Exosonic and Boom Supersonic, which are developing supersonic passenger jets; and Hermeus, which is developing a hypersonic passenger aircraft. Budget documents state the revised investment "will bolster evaluation and maturation of advanced high speed transport scale aircraft with potential to expand the defense industrial base and serve as C-32A replacements at the appropriate time." All three programs are many years away from delivery of production aircraft.

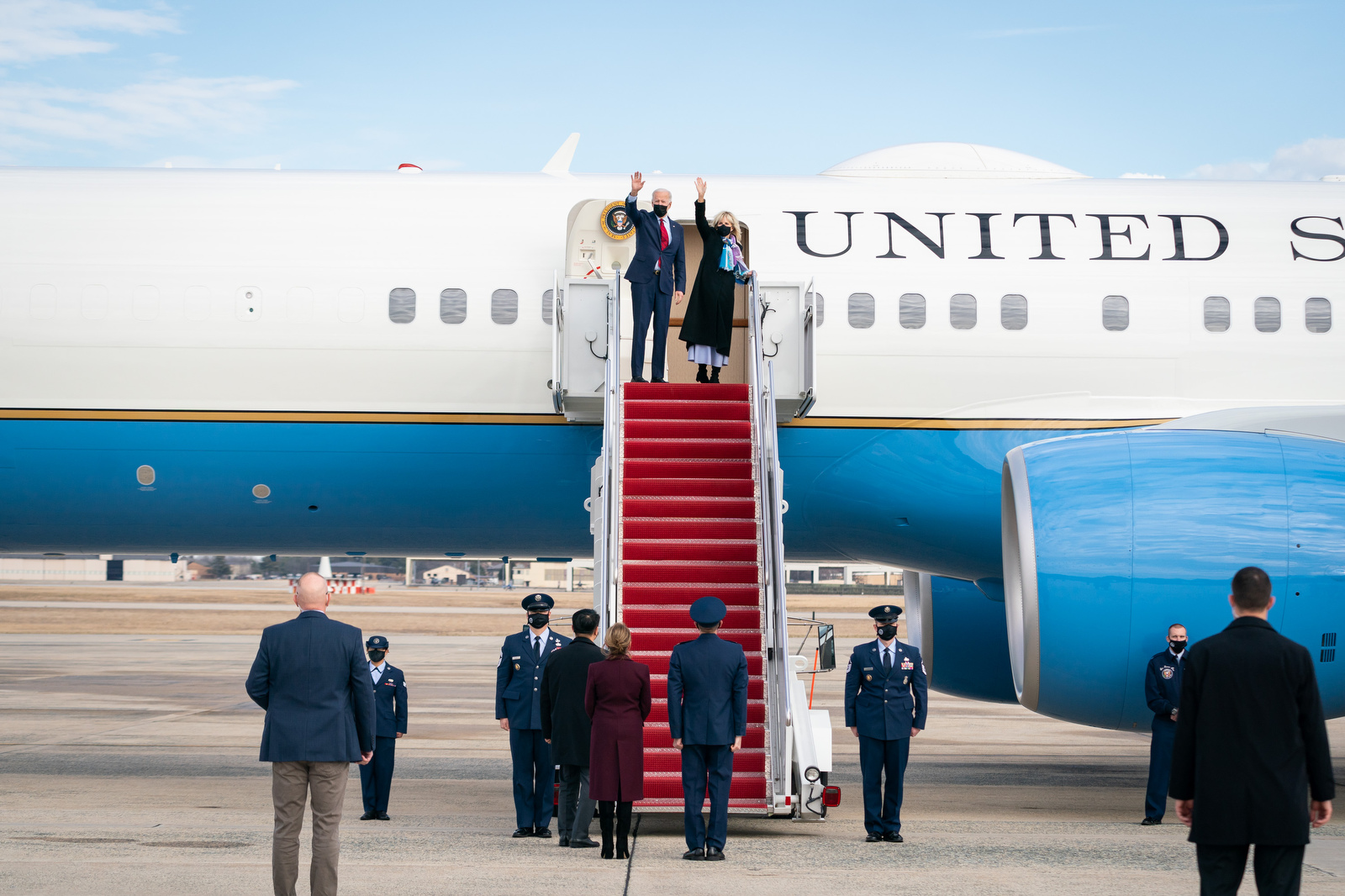
Joe Biden made his first flight as President aboard a C-32A in 2021

The C-32A is not planned to leave Air Mobility Command service until 2040; however, discussion of the aircraft's age has continued, prompted by high-profile reliability issues. For the duration the C-32A will remain in the fleet, the Air Force will not pursue investment in the airframe beyond already planned modifications, according to the service's fiscal 2022 budget request. Boeing (the sole producer which can fulfill Buy American Act purchasing restrictions for government passenger aircraft) has neglected the middle of the market since the 757 was discontinued in 2004, repeatedly shelving upgrade plans since 2014. In 2021, the company announced a clean sheet restart of plans for a successor aircraft, slated to enter service in the late 2020s.

== C-32B Gatekeeper ==
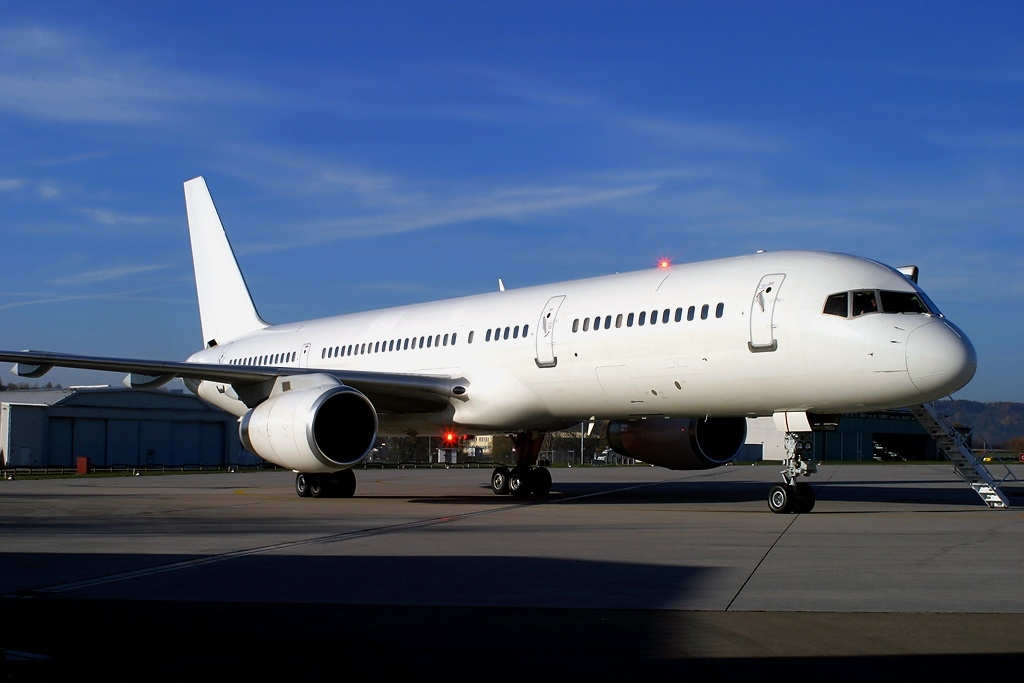
A C-32B with airstair deployed

=== Role ===
The 45-seat C-32B Gatekeeper provides airlift to the U.S. government's Gate Keeper (GK) mission, a special access program which provides clandestine support to foreign states through State Department Foreign Emergency Support Team missions and classified special operations and intelligence missions. The aircraft are operated by two different units, the New Jersey Air National Guard's 150th Special Operations Squadron at Joint Base McGuire-Dix-Lakehurst, New Jersey, and the 486th Flight Test Squadron at Eglin Air Force Base, Florida. The C-32Bs operate at the direction of the commander of U.S. Special Operations Command, though when serving a civilian agency, approval for the use of the aircraft is on the recommendation of the committee of deputy secretaries of defense with the consent of the secretary of defense. The development of the two aircraft emerged from the 2001 Air Force budget, where they were procured for $144.963 million (~$251 million in 2025) to fill an Air Force request for transportation capabilities for the Foreign and Domestic Emergency Support Teams. The Gate Keeper mission predates the aircraft, which are successors to previous fleets based on other models of aircraft. The planes have been spotted throughout the world, including such locations as Area 51 and the Tonopah Test Range. The C-32B became known during the George W. Bush administration for unsubstantiated theories which circulated that they were connected to the CIA's extraordinary rendition flights, giving them the onetime nickname “torture taxi.”

=== Equipment and capabilities ===
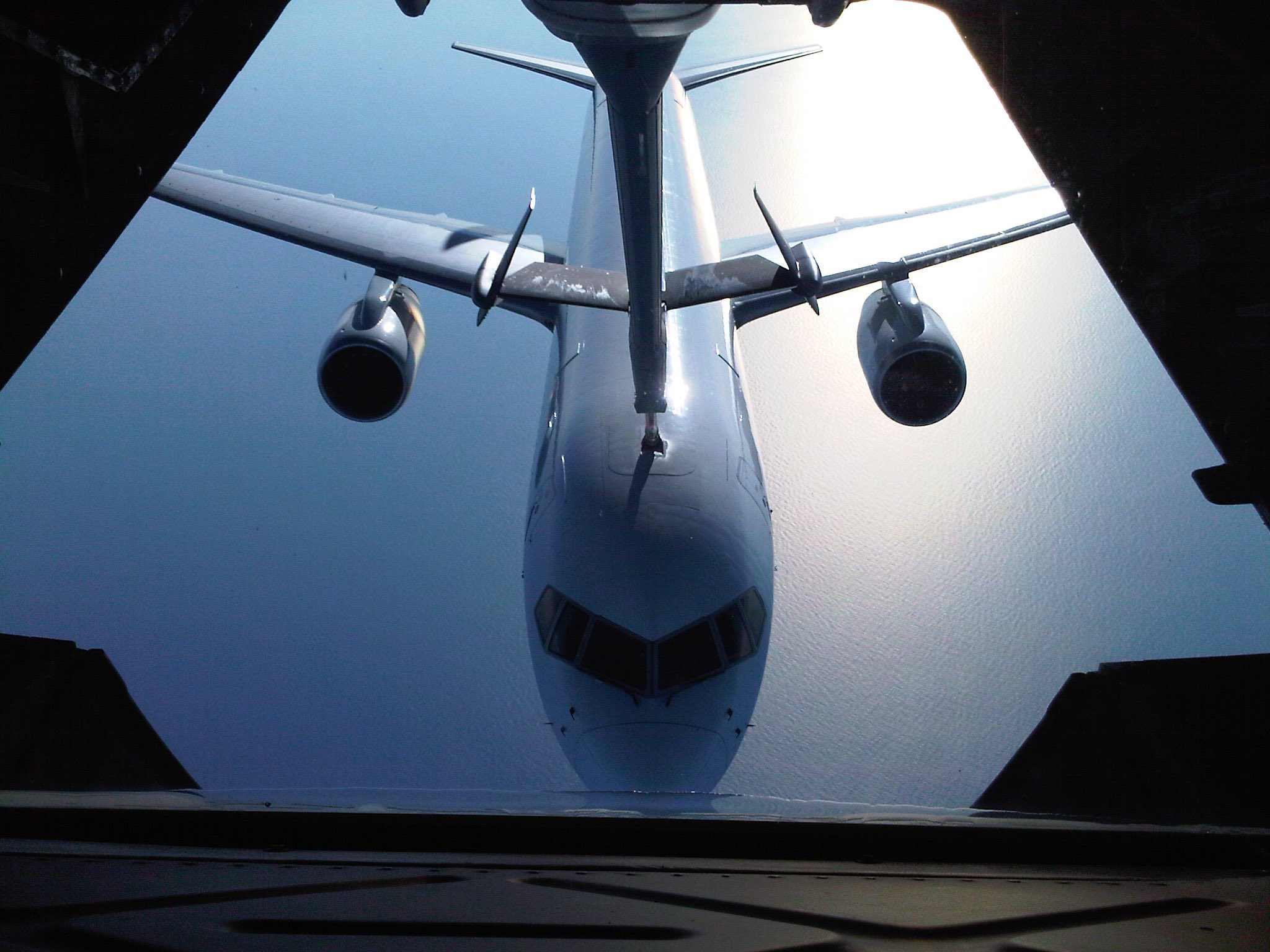
A C-32B during aerial refueling, viewed from a KC-10

The C-32Bs serve as on-call global transport. Unlike their VIP-carrying counterparts, they are outfitted for advanced communications and ultra long range. Most cargo must be stored in the rear of the aircraft because enlarged fuel tanks replace much of the below-deck cargo hold, extending the aircraft's unrefueled range to 6,000 nmi (6,900 mi; 11,000 km). The craft can refuel in flight via an unmarked, unlit conformal Universal Aerial Refueling Receptacle Slipway Installation (UARRSI) atop the fuselage, 9 feet (2.7 m) behind the cockpit windows, allowing the planes to remain airborne nearly indefinitely. The aircraft have an airstair that enables passengers to deplane without access to a jet bridge or stair truck, a heavy and uncommon modification in modern commercial aviation. They also have a winch to load baggage at austere environments and airfields that lack better handling equipment.

In 2014, the C-32Bs received audio and visual equipment upgrades, upgraded satellite communications systems, and secure Ku-band communications management systems to replace commercial-grade Inmarsat installations in use since 2002. Around the same time, the craft acquired a fairing on the roof of the rear of the craft. Similar modifications have appeared on the C-32As, the presidential VC-25As, the E-4B and E-6 “doomsday planes”, and the E-11A BACN. The protrusion reportedly houses Northrop Grumman’s Multi-Role Tactical Common Data Link (MR-TCDL), a Ka- and Ku-band telecommunications suite that functions as a flying wireless router and server, providing communications where traditional infrastructure is unavailable. Budget requests show that around 2016 the cockpit avionics were upgraded to include head-up displays. Depot-level maintenance on the C-32B is performed by Big Safari (the 645th Aeronautical Systems Squadron).

According to Air Force Manual 11-2C-32B (2020), at least two members of the C-32B aircrew are always armed.

=== Airframes ===
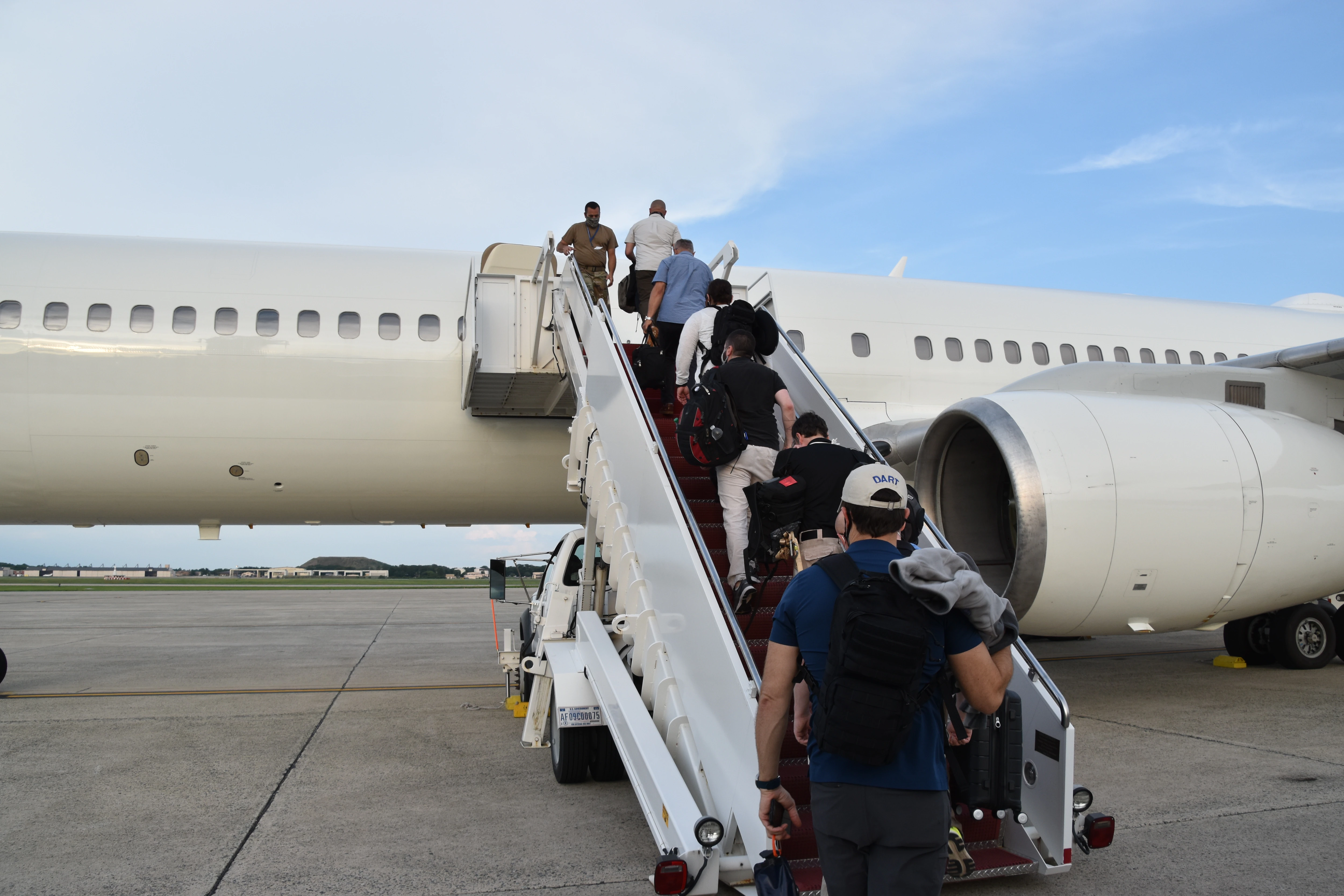
The Foreign Emergency Support Team boarding a C-32B to respond to the 2020 Beirut explosion

There are two C-32B aircraft as of 2021: 00-9001 and 02-4452. At times, the Air National Guard has appeared to deny the existence of one of the two aircraft. The 2012 edition of the National Guard's Weapons System Modernization Priorities report says that "the 150th Special Operations Squadron of the New Jersey Air National Guard operates the C-32B from Joint Base McGuire-Dix-Lakehurst, NJ and is the only U.S Air Force C-32B", but earlier and later editions describe a need to support upgrades to two aircraft. Both planes are painted gloss white, and usually lack recognizable external markings other than serial numbers. At various times, they have been spotted with "United States Air Force" emblazoned on the cheatline, the Air Force roundel on the tail section of the fuselage, or a small American flag on the same area of the rear fuselage. There are only two identified visual differences between the two aircraft: one has larger emergency ramp openings under the doorsills, and one has the rearward window removed from the forward bank of windows on the starboard side. To conceal their activities and identities, both planes are known to adopt varying serial numbers; examples include 00-9001, 98-6006, 99-6143, 02-5001, and 02-4452.

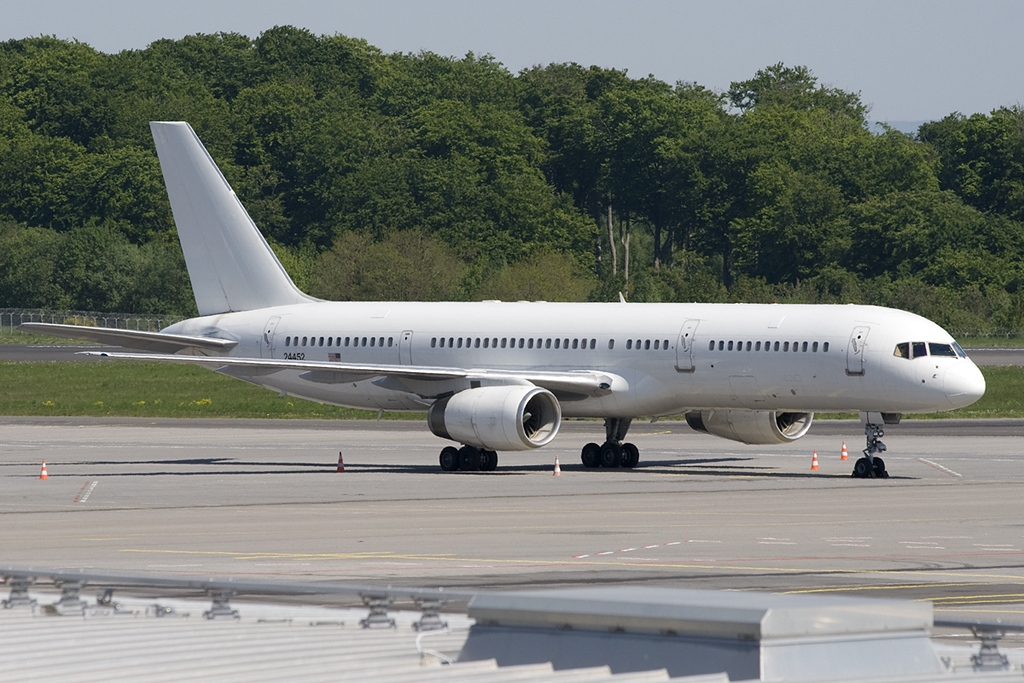
C-32B on the tarmac

The true identity of the older of the two aircraft is MSN 25493/523 (02-4452). Delivered to Ansett Worldwide as N59AW on 26 February 1993, it saw service with ATA airlines as 84WA before shuffling through private brokers, and was ultimately sold to the Air Force by Kodiak Associates LLC in 2000. The later aircraft is MSN 25494/611 (00-9001). Delivered to Avianca as N987AN on 22 April 1994, it passed through the hands of Raytheon E-Systems before the Air Force bought it in 2001. Both aircraft are powered by Rolls-Royce RB211 engines, rather than the Pratt & Whitney PW2000 used on the C-32A.

Sparsely marked secretive white 757s often conflated with the C-32B include N226G and N610G, a pair of 757s operated by L3Harris subsidiary L-3 Capital. The aircraft have been observed operating with various tail numbers, and featured the text "COMCO" in prominent black lettering on the tail until it was replaced by a conservative blue swoosh design. The near-identical equipment of the so-called COMCO aircraft, including airstair, Rolls-Royce engines, roof communications fairing, and an unexplained rectangular modification applied to the fuselage of both aircraft have fueled rumors that they are in fact C-32Bs with hasty paint or decals applied. Such claims have never been substantiated. Other similar aircraft include N119NA and N874TW, a pair of 757s based at Richmond International Airport, acquired by the U.S. Department of Justice in 2015; they display an American flag on their tail and can be distinguished from the C-32B by their winglets.

== Operators ==
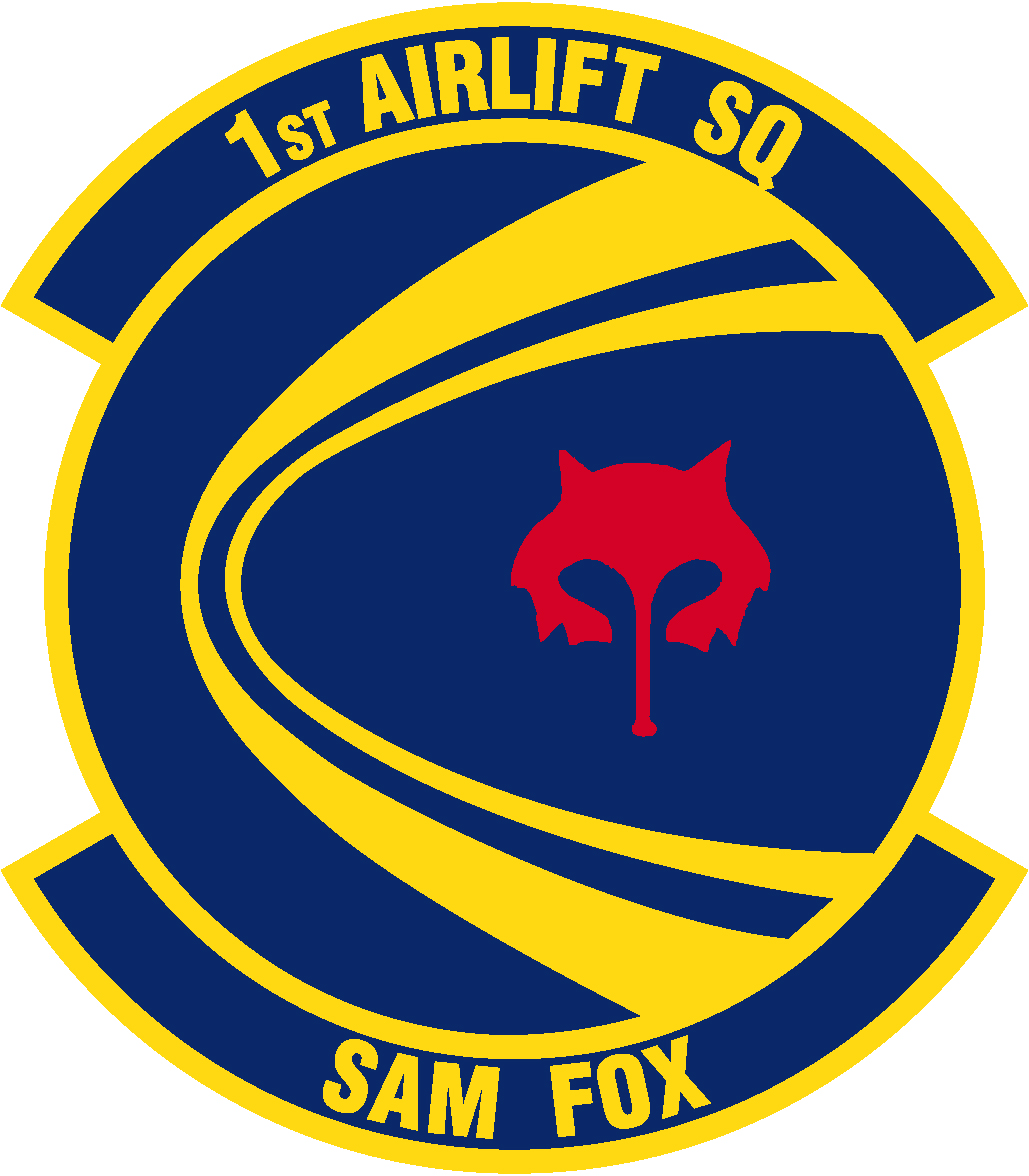
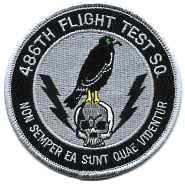

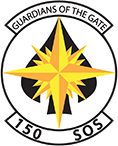
Insignia of the respective C-32 operators

United States

- C-32A
  - United States Air Force
    - 89th Airlift Wing
      - 1st Airlift Squadron – Joint Base Andrews, Maryland
- C-32B
  - United States Air Force
    - 96th Test Wing
      - 486th Flight Test Squadron – Eglin Air Force Base, Florida
  - New Jersey Air National Guard
    - 108th Wing
      - 150th Special Operations Squadron – Joint Base McGuire–Dix–Lakehurst, New Jersey

== Specifications ==
757-200

=== C-32A ===
Data from Jane's All the World's Aircraft 2003-04, USAF Museum factsheet

General characteristics

- Crew: 2 + 1 jump seat + 13 mission crew
- Capacity: 45
- Length: 155 ft 3 in (47.32 m)
- Wingspan: 124 ft 10 in (38.05 m)
- Height: 44 ft 3 in (13.49 m) at MTOW
- Wing area: 185.25 sq ft (17.210 m^{2})
- Empty weight: 128,730 lb (58,391 kg) OWE
- Maximum zero-fuel weight: 186,000 lb (84,368 kg) MZFW
- Max takeoff weight: 256,000 lb (116,120 kg) MTOW
- Maximum landing weight: 210,000 lb (95,254 kg) MLW
- Fuel capacity: 13,334 US gal (11,103 imp gal; 50,475 L) with auxiliary tanks in fwd and aft cargo holds
- Powerplant: 2 × Pratt & Whitney PW2000-40 turbofan engines, 40,100 lbf (178 kN) thrust each

Performance

- Maximum speed: 526 kn (605 mph, 974 km/h)
- Maximum speed: Mach 0.86 (M_{MO})
- Cruising speed: Mach 0.8
- Approach speed: 137 kn (158 mph; 254 km/h)
- Initial cruising height: 35,400 ft (10,790 m)
- Range: 5,650 nmi (6,500 mi, 10,460 km)
- Service ceiling: 42,000 ft (13,000 m)
- Wing loading: 127.88 lb/sq ft (624.4 kg/m^{2})
- Thrust/weight: 0.314
- Take-off field length: 7,800 ft (2,377 m) at sea level 29 °C (84 °F)
- Landing field length: 5,100 ft (1,554 m) at MLW

=== C-32B ===
Data from Air Force Manual 11-2C-32B, Volume 3 (2020)

General characteristics

- Crew: 2 + 1 jump seat + mission crew
- Capacity: unknown
- Length: 155 ft 3 in (47.32 m)
- Wingspan: 124 ft 10 in (38.05 m)
- Height: 44 ft 3 in (13.49 m) at MTOW
- Wing area: 185.25 sq ft (17.210 m^{2})
- Max takeoff weight: 256,000 lb (116,120 kg) MTOW
- Maximum landing weight: 210,000 lb (95,254 kg) MLW
- Fuel capacity: unknown, with auxiliary tanks and aerial refueling capabilities
- Powerplant: 2 × Rolls-Royce RB211-535E4 turbofan engines, 40,100 lbf (178 kN) thrust each

Performance

- Maximum speed: 526 kn (605 mph, 974 km/h)
- Maximum speed: Mach 0.86 (M_{MO})
- Cruising speed: Mach 0.8
- Approach speed: 137 kn (158 mph; 254 km/h)
- Initial cruising height: 35,400 ft (10,790 m)
- Service ceiling: 42,000 ft (13,000 m)
- Wing loading: 127.88 lb/sq ft (624.4 kg/m^{2})
- Thrust/weight: 0.314
- Take-off field length: 5,000 ft (1,524 m) at sea level 29 °C (84 °F)
- Landing field length: 5,000 ft (1,524 m) at MLW

== See also ==
- Douglas C-32 (Military designation for DC-2 in older naming system)

Related development

- Boeing 757

Aircraft of comparable role, configuration, and era

- Boeing VC-25
- Boeing C-40 Clipper

Related lists

- List of military aircraft of the United States
