= 108th Wing =

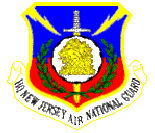
108th Wing

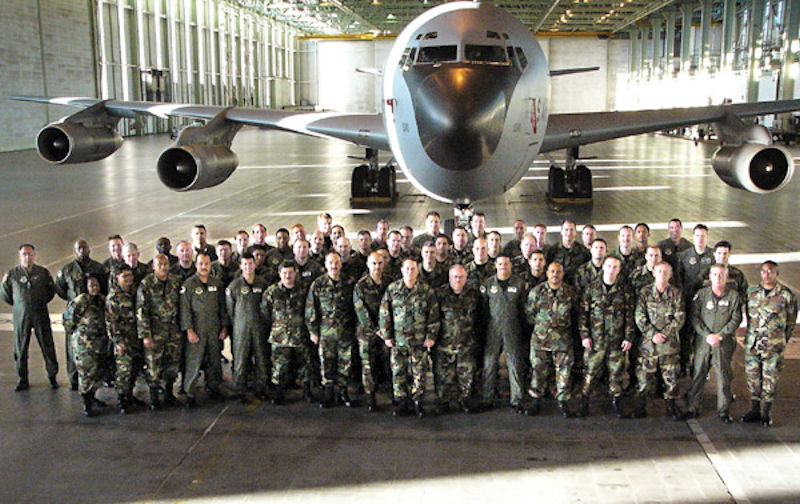
- 108th Wing KC-135 Stratotanker at Istres AB, France (Note: Wing members from the 108th deployed, under Operation Joint Forge, to Istres Air Base, France to assist in the base closure and the relocation of assets and personnel.)
- Active: 1950–present
- Country: United States
- Allegiance: New Jersey
- Branch: Air National Guard
- Type: Wing
- Role: Composite Air Refueling
- Part of: New Jersey Air National Guard
- Garrison/HQ: McGuire Air Force Base, New Jersey.
- Nickname: "Jersey Thunder"
- Motto: Victory Through the Sky (Note: From 1951–1994, this motto was in Latin as "Per Caelum Victoriae", translated as Through the Skies to Victory. Maurer, Combat Units, p. 228.)
- Tail Code: Orange Tail Stripe "New Jersey" in Black
- Website: https://www.108thwing.ang.af.mil

Commanders
- Current commander: Colonel David J. Shattls

Insignia
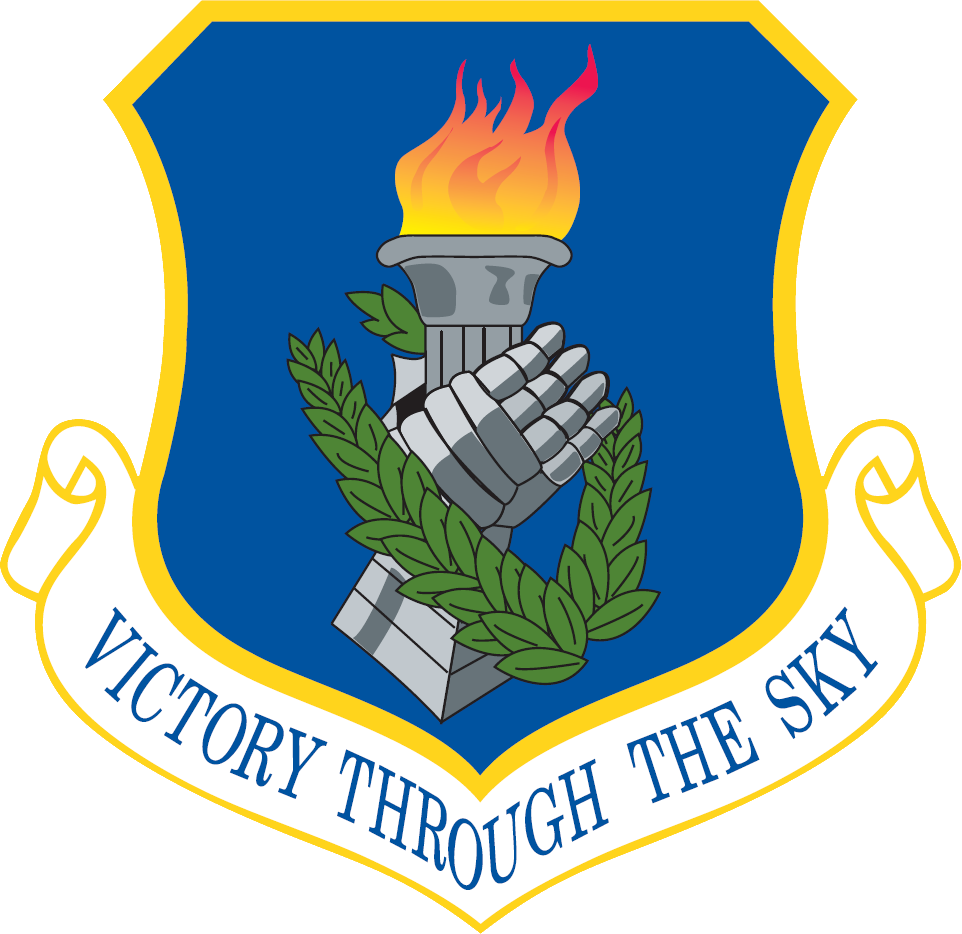
- 108th Wing emblem

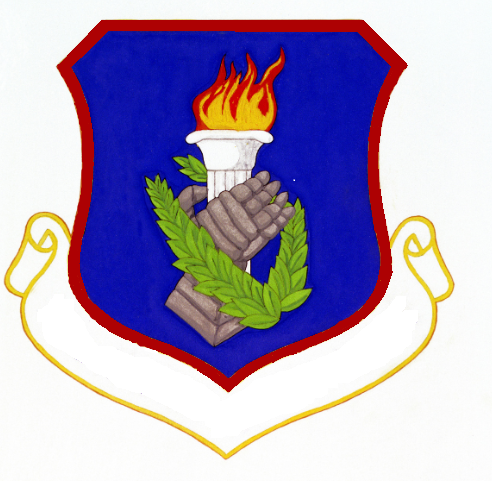
- 108 Fighter-Bomber Wing emblem (Note: approved 15 August 1951.)

Aircraft flown
- Transport: C-32B
- Tanker: KC-46A Pegasus

The 108th Wing is a unit of the New Jersey Air National Guard, one of the many units stationed at the McGuire Air Force Base entity of Joint Base McGuire-Dix-Lakehurst, New Jersey. If activated to federal service, the Wing is gained by the United States Air Force Air Mobility Command.

== Mission ==
The 108th Wing principal mission is air refueling. The wing enhances the Air Force's capability to accomplish its primary missions of Global Reach and Global Power. It also provides air refueling support to Air Force, Navy and Marine Corps aircraft as well as aircraft of allied nations. The wing is also capable of transporting litter and ambulatory patients using patient support pallets during aeromedical evacuations.

In addition to their primary air refueling mission, the Wing also supports an intelligence squadron and a cyberspace operations squadron

== Units ==
The 108th Wing consists of the following units:

- 108th Operations Group
  - 108th Operations Support Squadron
  - 140th Cyberspace Operations Squadron
  - 141st Air Refueling Squadron (KC-46A)
  - 170th Air Refueling Squadron (KC-46A)
  - 150th Special Operations Squadron (C-32B)
  - 204th Intelligence Squadron

The 140th Cyberspace Operations Squadron is one of the twelve Air National Guard Cyber Protection Teams that defend networks and systems against threats.

The 204th Intelligence Squadron is the first Air National Guard squadron that is solely dedicated to providing intelligence instruction and training products to the Air Mobility Command. It is also the first course of its kind in the intelligence community that integrates active duty, Air National Guard and Air Force Reserve students.

- 108th Maintenance Group
  - 108th Maintenance Squadron
  - 108th Aircraft Maintenance Squadron
  - 108th Maintenance Operations Flight
- 108th Mission Support Group
  - 108th Force Support Squadron
  - 108th Logistics Readiness Squadron
  - 108th Security Forces Squadron
  - 108th Communications Flight

The wing operates as a classic associate unit to the 305AMW flying the KC-46A and two C-32B Aircraft.

== History ==
=== Formation of the 108th Wing ===
The World War II 348th Fighter Group was redesignated as the 108th Fighter Group and allotted to the New Jersey National Guard on 24 May 1946. It was organized at Newark Municipal Airport and extended federal recognition later that year. Initially, the group reported to the 52d Fighter Wing of the New York National Guard and was supported by the 208th Air Service Group. In the fall of 1950, the Air National Guard reorganized its combat units under the wing base organization that had been used by the regular Air Force since 1947. In this reorganization, the 108th Fighter Wing was formed to include the 108th Group and its support elements, organized into the 108th Air Base Group, 108th Maintenance and Supply Group and the 108th Medical Group.

=== Korean War mobilization ===
Only a few months after being organized, the unit was called to active federal service on 1 March 1951 and moved to Turner Air Force Base, Georgia, where it was assigned to Strategic Air Command's 40th Air Division. At Turner it became the 108th Fighter-Bomber Wing in May. In December 1951 it was transferred to Tactical Air Command and moved to Godman Air Force Base, Kentucky where it replaced the 123d Fighter-Bomber Wing, which had moved to England. On 1 December 1952, the wing transferred its mission, personnel and equipment to the 405th Fighter-Bomber Wing and returned to state control.

=== Return to state control ===
With return to state control, the wing assumed the air defense mission. Despite its retention of the fighter bomber designation, it was gained by Air Defense Command (ADC) upon mobilization. ADC required the squadrons it gained to be designed to augment active duty squadrons capable of performing air defense missions for an indefinite period after mobilization independently of their parent wing. It was not until 1955 that the wing was redesignated the 108th Fighter-Interceptor Wing. The redesignation coincided with the change from long-range North American P-51H Mustang fighter. designed for the invasion of Japan, the P-51H was the last variant of the P-51 Mustang of World War II, but was produced too late to see any wartime combat. Not used in the Korean War due to it not being believed as rugged as its famous "D model" predecessor, the P-51H was used to equip Air National Guard units in the 1950s as an interceptor. In 1955, the Mustangs were retired and the squadron entered the jet age, with the arrival of the North American F-86E Sabre.

The 108th FIW was transferred to Tactical Air Command (TAC) in 1958, being re-designated as a Tactical Fighter Wing. The 141st and 119th Tactical Fighter Squadrons transferred its interceptors and received and F-84F Thunderstreak fighter-bombers.

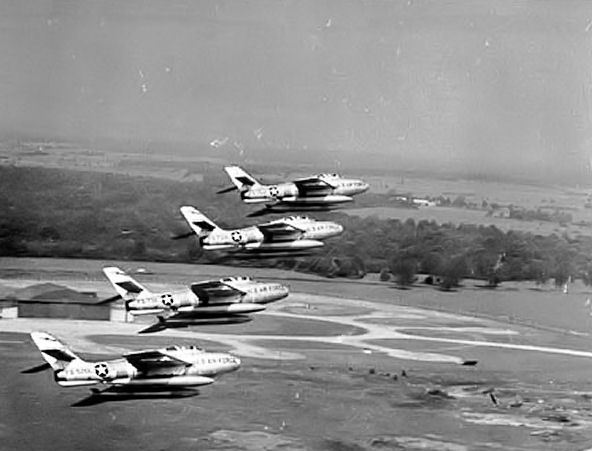
F-84Fs from the 7108th Tactical Wing over Chaumont-Semoutiers Air Base, France – 1962.

On 1 October 1961, as a result of the Berlin crisis, the 108th TFW was again ordered to active federal duty. When activated, the 108th consisted of three squadrons, the 119th TFS at Atlantic City Airport, the 141st TFS McGuire Air Force Base, New Jersey, and the 149th TFS from the Virginia ANG at Byrd Field, near Richmond, Virginia. All three squadrons were flying the F-84F Thunderstreak.

Once activated, the wing was deployed to Chaumont-Semoutiers Air Base, France. However, only a portion of the 108th TFW deployed to France due to DOD budget limitations. This consisted of 28 F-84F's of the 141st TFS and officers and airmen from all three squadrons, with the remaining aircraft and personnel remaining on active duty at their home stations. The first elements of the 108th deployed to Chaumont from McGuire AFB on 16 October with the last aircraft and personnel arriving on 6 November. The ground units deployed by sealift, with the deployed elements reaching Chaumont by 17 November.

In France, the deployed elements of the 108th TFW were designated the 7108th Tactical Wing on 20 November due to the reduced strength of the wing in Europe. The primary mission of the 7108th was to provide close air support to the Seventh Army in Europe under the direction of Ground Forward Air Controllers. To accomplish this mission, up to 30 sorties were flown each day. Pilots and aircraft were rotated back and forth from Atlantic City and Richmond in order for all pilots in the wing to become familiar with flying conditions at Chaumont and to teach USAFE operational procedures.

The deployment to France ended in October 1962 and the wing returned to New Jersey state control. The 119th TFS expanded to group size with the activation of the 177th Tactical Fighter Group. Immediately following this action, their F-84Fs were replaced by North American F-86H Sabres. The 141st TFS, having left their F-84F's in France, were re-equipped with F-86H's upon their return.

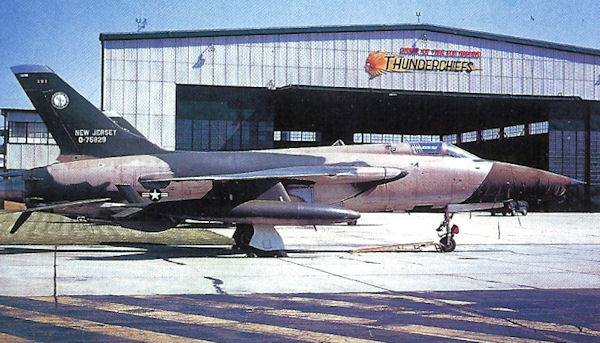
Wing F-105B Thunderchief (Note: Aircraft is Republic F-105B-20-RE, serial 57-5829. The sign on the hangar proudly proclaiming McGuire AFB as the "Home of the Air Guard Thunderchiefs". This plane was sent to Tinker Air Force Base, where it was used to practice airfield battle damage repair. Baugher, Joe (29 April 2023). "1957 USAF Serial Numbers". Joe Baugher.)

In April 1964, the 108th traded their Sabrejets in for the Republic F-105 Thunderchief. the 108th was the first Air National Guard unit to fly twice the speed of sound. In May 1981, the McDonnell F-4D Phantom II replaced the F-105s, and in 1985, they were upgraded to the F-4E Phantom II.

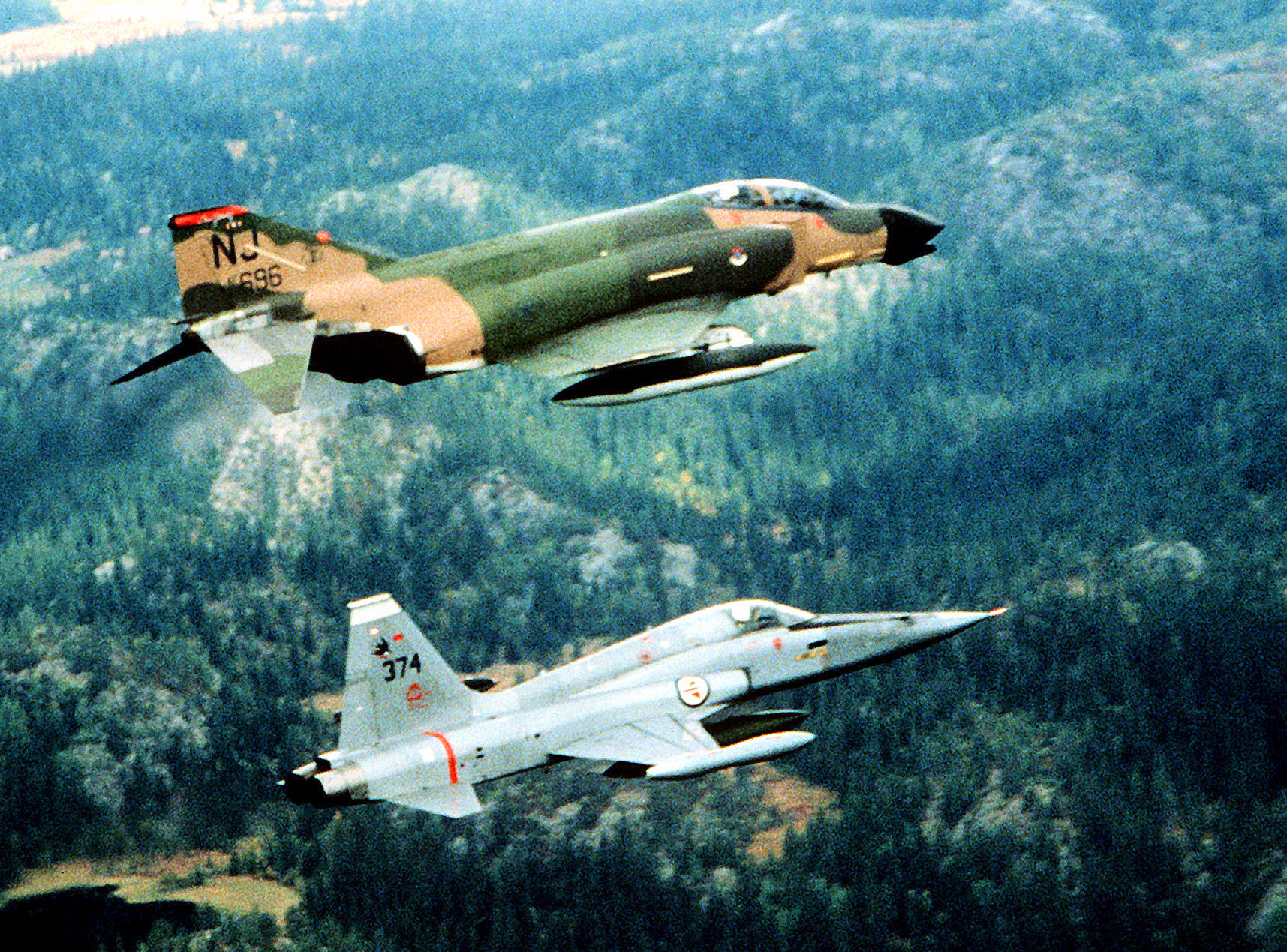
141st Squadron F-4D Phantom II with a Norwegian Air Force F-5 Freedom Fighter while deployed to NATO on 1 September 1982. (Note: Aircraft is McDonnell F-4D-28-MC Phantom II, serial 65-696. After its retirement in 1985, this aircraft was briefly in private hands with civil registration N402AV, then preserved at the Heritage Aviation Airpark, Palmdale, California.)

In 1989, the 108th was declared the best Air National Guard flying unit and awarded the Spaatz Trophy. It participated in numerous exercises and made six overseas deployments as a fighter unit, to France, Greece, Ecuador and three times to Norway.

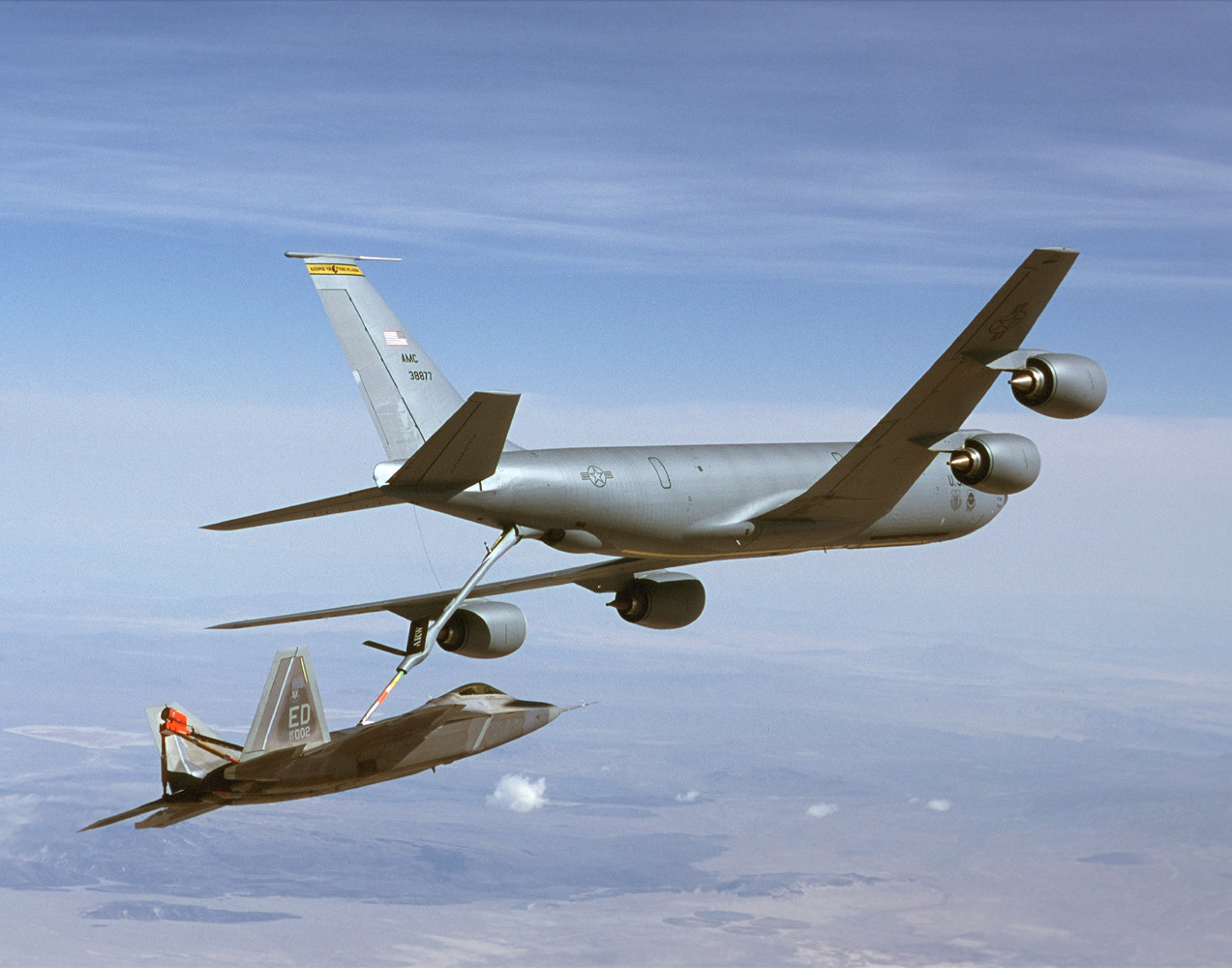
KC-135 refueling an F-22A

=== Air refueling ===
With the end of the Cold War, the 108th Tactical Fighter Wing was re-aligned to a KC-135 Stratotanker Air Refueling Wing. The F-4s were retired and the squadron was redesignated as the 141st Air Refueling Squadron. Also, as part of the conversion of the wing to the Objective Wing organization, the 108th Tactical Fighter Group became the 108th Operations Group, to which the 141st was assigned. The 108th received its first Boeing KC-135 Stratotanker (KC-135E) on 27 September. Yet, a scant 69 days later, on 6 December, it flew its first refueling mission. Forty-one days later, on 16 January 1992, it flew its first operational mission – a night, air refueling of an E-3B "Sentry" bound for the Persian Gulf.

1992 was a busy year for the 108th. They flew their first passenger airlift mission on 27 February; its first overseas mission (Costa Rica) on 13 March; its first European mission, Germany 28 May, (South Korea) on 20 July, and its first humanitarian mission on 1 September, (three Stratotankers filled with critically needed supplies to "Hurricane Andrew" (Florida) victims). The wing was certified combat ready on 3 December 1992. The very next day it was tasked with two missions – its first operational deployment – nothing less than spearheading and establishing the U.S. – Somalia air bridge for Operation Restore Hope. It not only deployed an air refueling detachment to Moron Air Base, Spain, but also airlifted active duty air crews to Cairo West Air Base, Egypt. In January 1993, while deployed at Moron Air Base, Spain, the Wing off loaded its one millionth pound of fuel.

On 1 October 1993, the NJ ANG 170th Air Refueling Group combined with the 108th Air Refueling Wing. The 108th welcomed the 150th Air Refueling Squadron's 37 years experience in airlift and air refueling operations, and its 130,454 accident-free flying hours, recognized as the world's safest flying record.

In September 1994, for over 30 days, five aircraft and 300 members deployed to Pisa, Italy for DENY FLIGHT. The 108th replaced the 126 ARW of the Illinois Air National Guard. Supported by 15 active duty Air Force personnel, the 108th Wing was the first Air National Guard unit to take full responsibility during that period.

May through August 1995, 13 members of the 108th and 170th Clinic deployed to Guantanamo Bay Naval Base, Cuba for a humanitarian mission, Operation Sea Signal.

In 2007, the 108 ARW began retiring its KC-135E aircraft and transitioning to the KC-135R. On 20 September 2023, the squadron flew its last mission with the KC-135R, as it transitioned to becoming an associate squadron of the 305th Air Mobility Wing, flying Boeing KC-46 Pegasus tankers.

== Lineage ==
- Established as the 108th Fighter Wing c. 25 October 1950

Activated on 1 November 1950
Federalized and called to active duty on 1 March 1951
Redesignated 108th Fighter-Bomber Wing on 16 May 1951
Released from active duty and returned to New Jersey state control on 1 December 1952
Redesignated 108th Fighter-Interceptor Wing on 1 July 1955
Redesignated 108th Tactical Fighter Wing (Special Delivery) on 1 July 1958
Federalized and called to active duty, 1 October 1961
Federalized deployed components operated as 7108th Tactical Wing
Released from active duty and returned to New Jersey state control on 30 August 1962
Redesignated 108th Tactical Fighter Wing
Redesignated 108th Air Refueling Wing on 19 October 1991
Redesignated 108th Wing on 1 December 2009

=== Assignments ===
- New Jersey Air National Guard, 1 November 1950
- 40th Air Division, 14 March 1951
- Ninth Air Force, 18 November 1951 – 1 December 1952
- New Jersey Air National Guard, 1 December 1952 – present

Gained by: Air Defense Command
Gained by: Tactical Air Command, 1 July 1958
Federalized 7108th Tactical Wing assigned to United States Air Forces in Europe, 1 October 1961 – 30 August 1962
Gained by: Air Combat Command, 1 June 1992
Gained by: Air Mobility Command, 1 June 1993–Present

=== Components ===
Groups

- 103d Tactical Fighter Group, unknown – c. 1 July 1979
- 104th Tactical Fighter Group, c. June 1972 – c. 1 July 1979
- 108th Fighter Group (later 108th Fighter-Bomber Group, 108th Fighter-Interceptor Group, 108th Tactical Fighter Group, 108th Operations Group), 1 November 1950 – 1 December 1952, 1 December 1952 – 1 October 1958, 1 October 1962 – 9 December 1974, 1 October 1993 – present
- 170th Air Refueling Group, 1 October 1991 – 1 October 1993
- 174th Tactical Fighter Group, c. June 1972 – 1 July 1979
- 175th Tactical Fighter Group, 12 April 1968 – 13 May 1968
- 177th Tactical Fighter Group, 15 October 1962 – c. August 1965
- 192d Tactical Fighter Group, 15 October 1962 – 1 June 1993

Squadrons

- 119th Fighter-Interceptor Squadron, 1 October 1958 – 15 October 1962
- 149th Fighter Squadron, 1 October 1961 – 17 August 1962
- 141st Tactical Fighter Squadron, 1 October 1958 – 1 October 1962 (Note: On 8 September 1973, the 141st Tactical Fighter Squadron was withdrawn from the National Guard and inactivated, redesignated the 341st Fighter Squadron and disbanded. The 141st Aero Squadron, which had been demobilized on 19 July 1919 was reconstituted, redesignated the 141st Tactical Fighter Squadron, allotted to the Air National Guard and activated in its place. DAF/PRM Letter 719p, Subject: Organization Actions Affecting Certain Air National Guard units, 31 July 1973.)
- 141st Tactical Fighter Squadron (later 141st Air Refueling Squadron), 9 December 1974 – present

=== Stations ===
- Mercer Airport, New Jersey, 1 November 1950
- Turner Air Force Base, Georgia, 1 March 1951
- Godman Air Force Base, Kentucky, 11 December 1951 – 1 December 1952
- McGuire Air Force Base, New Jersey, 30 November 1952 – Present
- Chaumont-Semoutiers Air Base, France, 1 October 1961
- McGuire Air Force Base, New Jersey, 30 August 1962 – present

=== Aircraft ===
- Republic F-47D Thunderbolt, 1949–1952
- North American F-51H Mustang, 1952–1955
- North American F-86E Sabre, 1955–1958
- Republic F-84F Thunderstreak, 1958–1962
- North American F-86H Sabre, 1962–1965
- Republic F-105B Thunderchief, 1965–1981
- McDonnell F-4D Phantom II, 1981–1985
- McDonnell F-4E Phantom II, 1985–1991
- Boeing KC-135E Stratotanker, 1991–2007
- Boeing C-135B Stratolifter, 1992–2004
- Boeing KC-135R Stratotanker, 2007–2023
- Boeing KC-46 Pegasus, 2023–present
