= 170th Group =

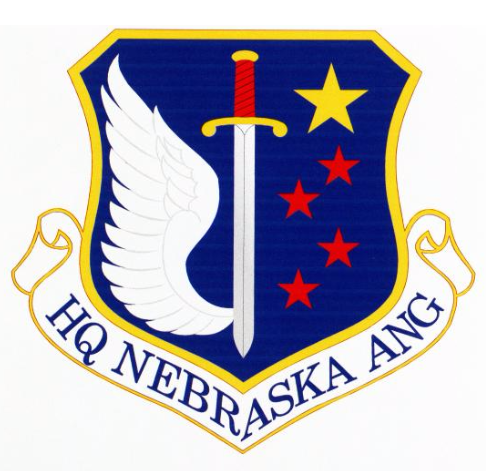
170th Group

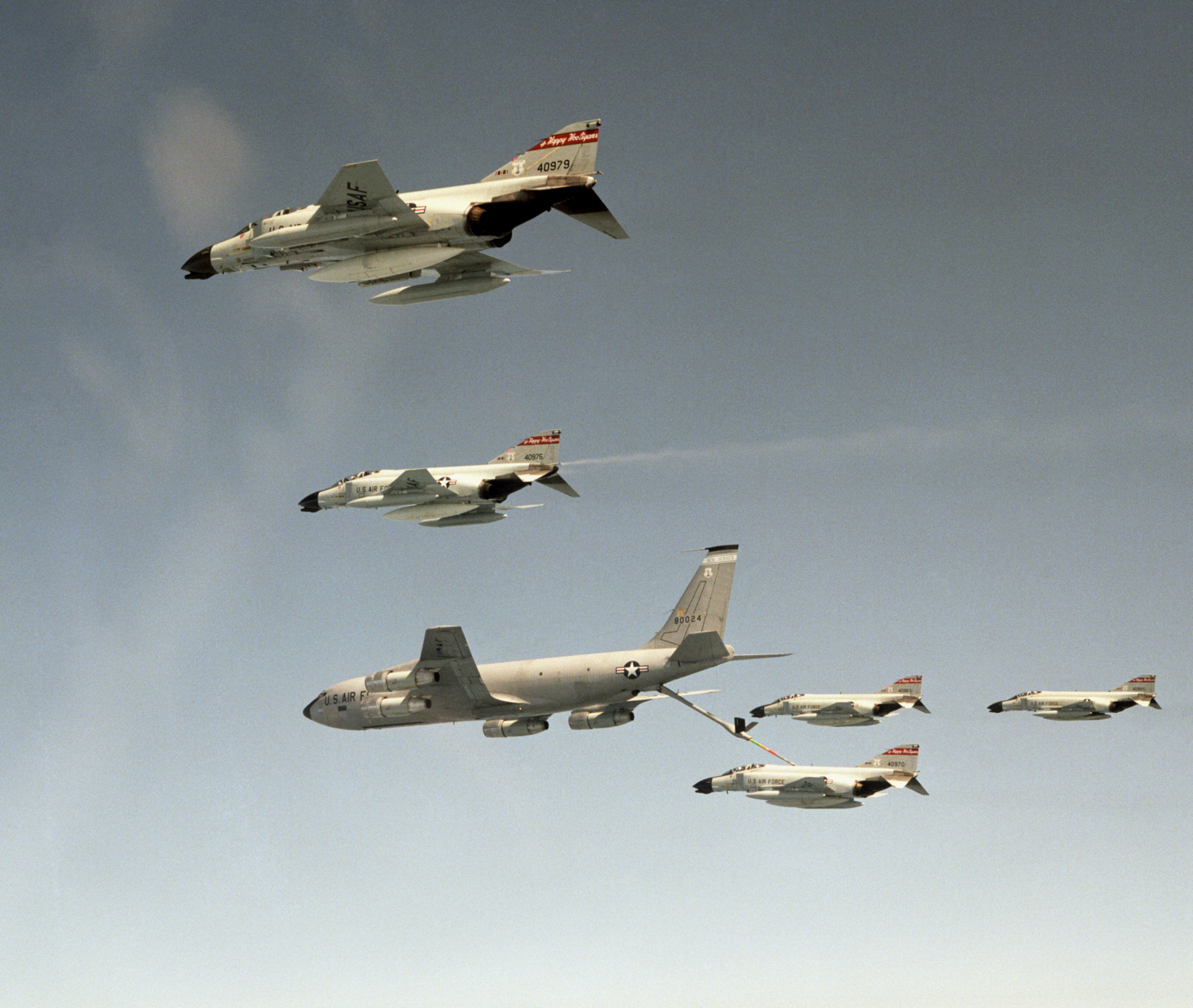
- F-4Ds refueling from a group KC-135E in 1985
- Active: 1964–1993; 2007–present
- Country: United States
- Allegiance: Nebraska
- Branch: Air National Guard
- Type: Group
- Role: Training and operations support
- Size: 80 personnel
- Part of: Nebraska Air National Guard
- Garrison/HQ: Offutt Air Force Base, Nebraska
- Motto: Global Readiness
- Decorations: Air Force Outstanding Unit Award

Commanders
- Current commander: Col. Wendy Squarcia

Insignia
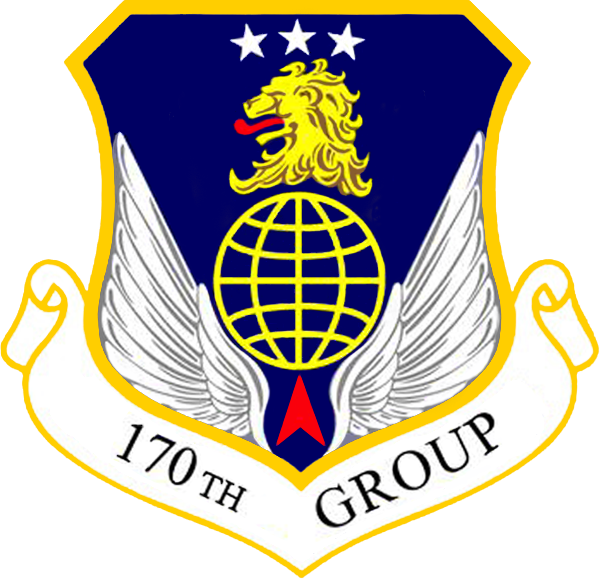
- 170th Group emblem

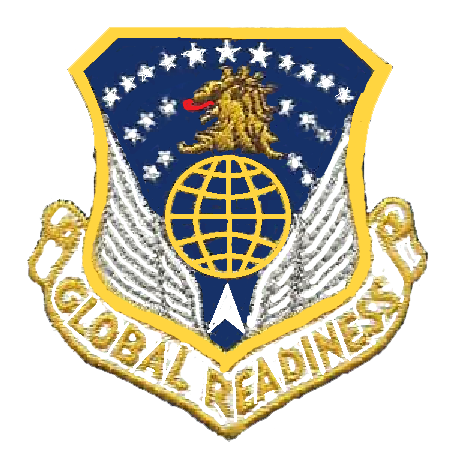
- 170th Tactical Airlift Group emblem

The 170th Group is a unit of the Nebraska Air National Guard, stationed at Offutt Air Force Base, Nebraska. If activated to federal service, the group would be gained by the United States Air Force Air Combat Command.

The group was originally activated in the New Jersey Air National Guard as the 170th Air Transport Group, a strategic airlift unit in 1964. It served in various airlift roles until 1977 when it was redesignated the 170th Air Refueling Group and performed the air refueling mission until it was inactivated in 1993 when the Air National Guard adopted the Air Force's Objective wing organization.

== Mission ==
The 170th Group grew out of Detachment 1 of Headquarters Nebraska Air National Guard, which was established in June 2002. It gathers members of the Nebraska Air National Guard stationed at Offutt Air Force Base into a single administrative unit as part of the "Future Total Force Initiative." Through this initiative, Guard instructor aircrew integrate with the 338th Combat Training Squadron to provide initial qualification, requalification and upgrade training to active duty USAF and Air National Guard aircrew members in the RC-135 Rivet Joint, Combat Sent and Cobra Ball aircraft and the E-4B NIGHTWATCH aircraft. These instructors are assigned to the 238th Combat Training Squadron.

Likewise, Guardsmen integrate into the 55th Operations Support Squadron (55 OSS) to support the global operations of the 55th Wing (55 WG), providing training and operational support to the active duty wing's global command and control and intelligence missions. Areas supported include requirements, weapons and tactics, intelligence, base operations, weather, and aviation resource management. These Guardsment form the 170th Operations Support Squadron (170 OSS). Overall, the 170th Group is authorized 80 personnel, including 35 full-time and 45 traditional Guardsmen.

The 170th was reactivated in a ceremony on 6 July 2007 at Offutt Air Force Base.

== History ==
The group was first activated at Newark Municipal Airport on 18 January 1964 as the 170th Air Transport Group to provide a headquarters for the 150th Air Transport Squadron and its supporting units. The group initially operated Lockheed C-121 Constellation long-distance transports, primarily for passenger movements to Europe. Eighteen months after its formation, the group moved to McGuire Air Force Base.

The 170th also flew to the Caribbean and, during the Vietnam War, to Japan, Thailand, South Vietnam, Australia and the Philippines. In 1966, when Military Airlift Command replaced Military Air Transport Service, the group became the 170th Military Airlift Group. From 1969 the group focused on airlifting patients, and became the 170th Aeromedical Airlift Group.

The Constellations were retired in 1973, and were replaced with de Havilland Canada C-7 Caribou light transports, which were returning from service in the Vietnam War. The C-7s were used for carrying small payloads in forward areas with unimproved airstrips.

In 1977 the 170th received Boeing KC-135 Stratotankers and became the 150th Air Refueling Squadron. On 1 October 1993, the 170th Air Refueling Group was combined with the 108th Air Refueling Wing at McGuire when the New Jersey Air National Guard implemented the Air Force's Objective Wing organization, which called for all units on a base to be assigned to a single wing. The group was inactivated while its 150th Air Refueling Squadron was assigned to the 108th Operations Group as its second KC-135 squadron.

In 2007, the group was activated as the 170th Group at Offutt Air Force Base, Nebraska to unify Air National Guard support for the 55th Wing.

== Lineage ==
- Established as the 170th Air Transport Group, Heavy and allotted to the Air National Guard on 16 December 1963
- Activated and extended federal recognition and activated, 18 January 1964

Redesignated 170th Military Airlift Group on 1 January 1966
Redesignated 170th Aeromedical Airlift Group c. 1 December 1969
Redesignated 170th Tactical Airlift Group on 9 June 1973 (Note: he group is unrelated to a 170th Tactical Air Support Group that was constituted on 30 May 1972 but never activated.)
Redesignated 170th Air Refueling Group, Heavy on 1 April 1977
Inactivated on: 30 September 1993

- Withdrawn from New Jersey and allotted to Nebraska on 1 July 2007

Activated and extended federal recognition on 7 July 2007

=== Assignments ===
- New Jersey Air National Guard, 18 January 1964
- 133d Air Transport Wing, March 1964
- 171st Military Airlift Wing (later 171st Aeromedical Airlift Wing), 1 January 1966
- 118th Tactical Airlift Wing, 9 June 1973
- 171st Air Refueling Wing, 1 April 1977
- 108th Air Refueling Wing, c. October 1991 – 1 October 1993
- Nebraska Air National Guard, 7 July 2007 – Present

Mobilization gaining commands
Military Air Transport Service, 18 January 1964
Military Airlift Command, 1 January 1966
Strategic Air Command 1 April 1977 – 1 June 1992
Air Combat Command, 1 June 1992 – 1 October 1993
Air Combat Command, 7 July 2007

=== Components ===
- 150th Air Transport Squadron (later 150th Military Airlift Squadron, 150th Aeromedical Airlift Squadron, 150th Tactical Airlift Squadron, 150th Air Refueling Squadron), 18 January 1964 – 30 September 1993
- 170th Operations Support Squadron, 7 July 2007 – present
- 238th Combat Training Squadron (redesignated 238th Reconnaissance Squadron 18 Oct 2024), 7 July 2007 – present

=== Stations ===
- Newark Municipal Airport, New Jersey, 18 January 1964
- McGuire Air Force Base, New Jersey, 1 July 1965 – 30 September 1993
- Offutt Air Force Base, Nebraska, 7 July 2007 – present

=== Aircraft ===
- Lockheed C-121 Constellation, 1964-1973
- de Havilland Canada C-7 Caribou, 1973-1977
- Convair C-131 Samaritan, 1977 (1 VIP Aircraft)
- Boeing KC-135 Stratotanker, 1977-1993

=== Awards ===
Award streamer	Award	Dates	Notes
	Air Force Meritorious Unit Award	1 June 2009 – 31 May 2010	170th Group
	Air Force Meritorious Unit Award	1 June 2014 – 31 May 2015	170th Group
	Air Force Outstanding Unit Award	1 April 1966 – 23 September 1970	170th Military Airlift Group
	Air Force Outstanding Unit Award	4 April 1971 – 1 April 1972	170th Aeromedical Airlift Group
	Air Force Outstanding Unit Award	1 July 1979 – 30 June 1981	170th Air Refueling Group
