= Comcom =

COMCOM may refer to:

- Communicative competence
- Commerce Commission, New Zealand government agency
- Federal Communications Commission of the Swiss Federal Department of Environment, Transport, Energy and Communications
- Communauté de communes, in France

== See also ==
- COMCO (disambiguation)
