= 150th Special Operations Squadron =

New Jersey Air National Guard unit

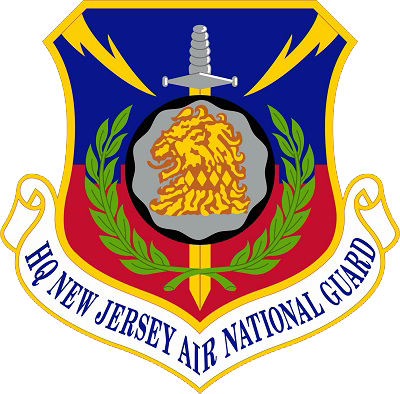
150th Special Operations Squadron

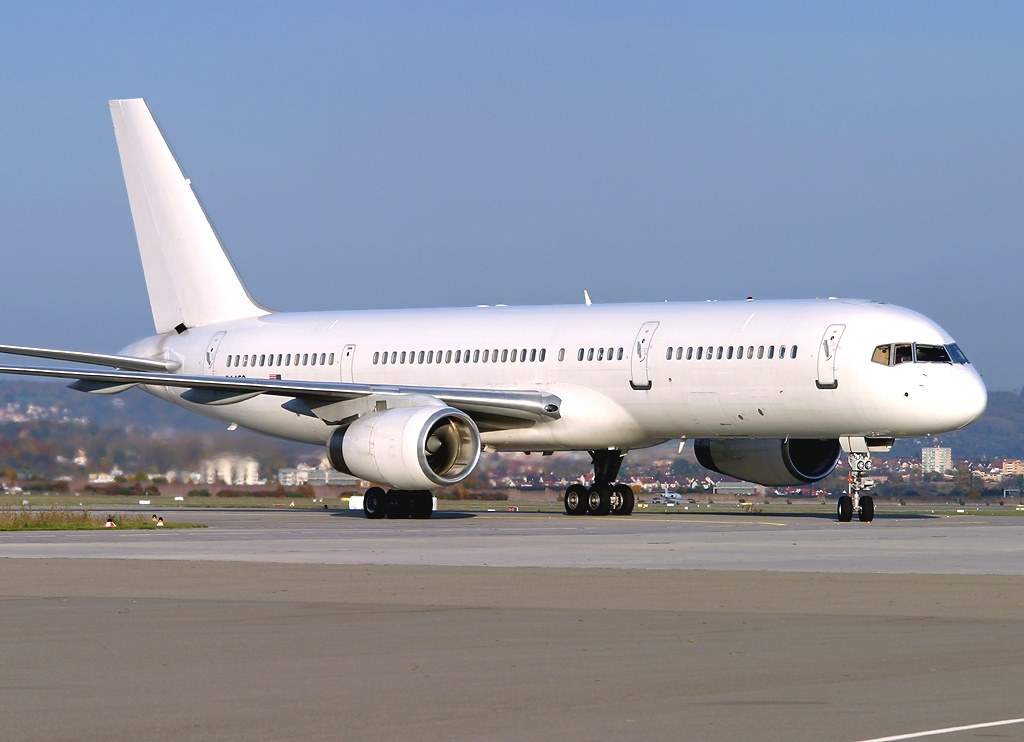
- Boeing C-32B as flown by the squadron
- Active: 1956–2008 unknown–present
- Country: United States
- Allegiance: New Jersey
- Branch: Air National Guard
- Role: Transport
- Part of: New Jersey Air National Guard: 108th Wing; 108th Operations Group
- Garrison/HQ: McGuire Air Force Base, Wrightstown, New Jersey
- Nickname: Guardians of the Gate
- Motto: Count on Us Bet on Us
- Decorations: Air Force Outstanding Unit Award

Insignia
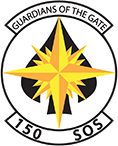
- 150th Special Operations Squadron emblem

- 150th Air Refueling Squadron emblem

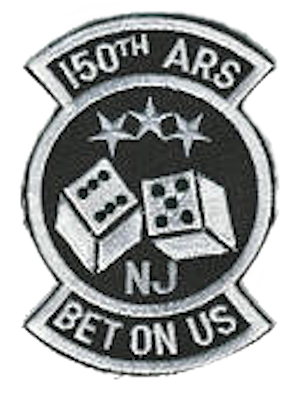
- 150th Air Transport Squadron emblem

The 150th Special Operations Squadron (150 SOS), equipped with the C-32B aircraft, is a unit of the 108th Wing of the New Jersey Air National Guard. It provides global airlift to special response teams within the Department of Defense and other agencies.

The squadron was established in 1956 as the 150th Air Transport Squadron. The following year, it converted to the aeromedical evacuation mission as the 150th Aeromedical Evacuation Transport Squadron. It continued in various airlift roles until 1973, when it converted to the air refueling mission as the 150th Air Refueling Squadron. The squadron was stationed at Newark Municipal Airport until 1965, when it moved to McGuire Air Force Base, New Jersey. The squadron was inactivated in 2008 following the retirement of the wing's Boeing KC-135E Stratotanker aircraft. It was later reactivated with a special operations mission.

== History ==
=== Airlift operations ===
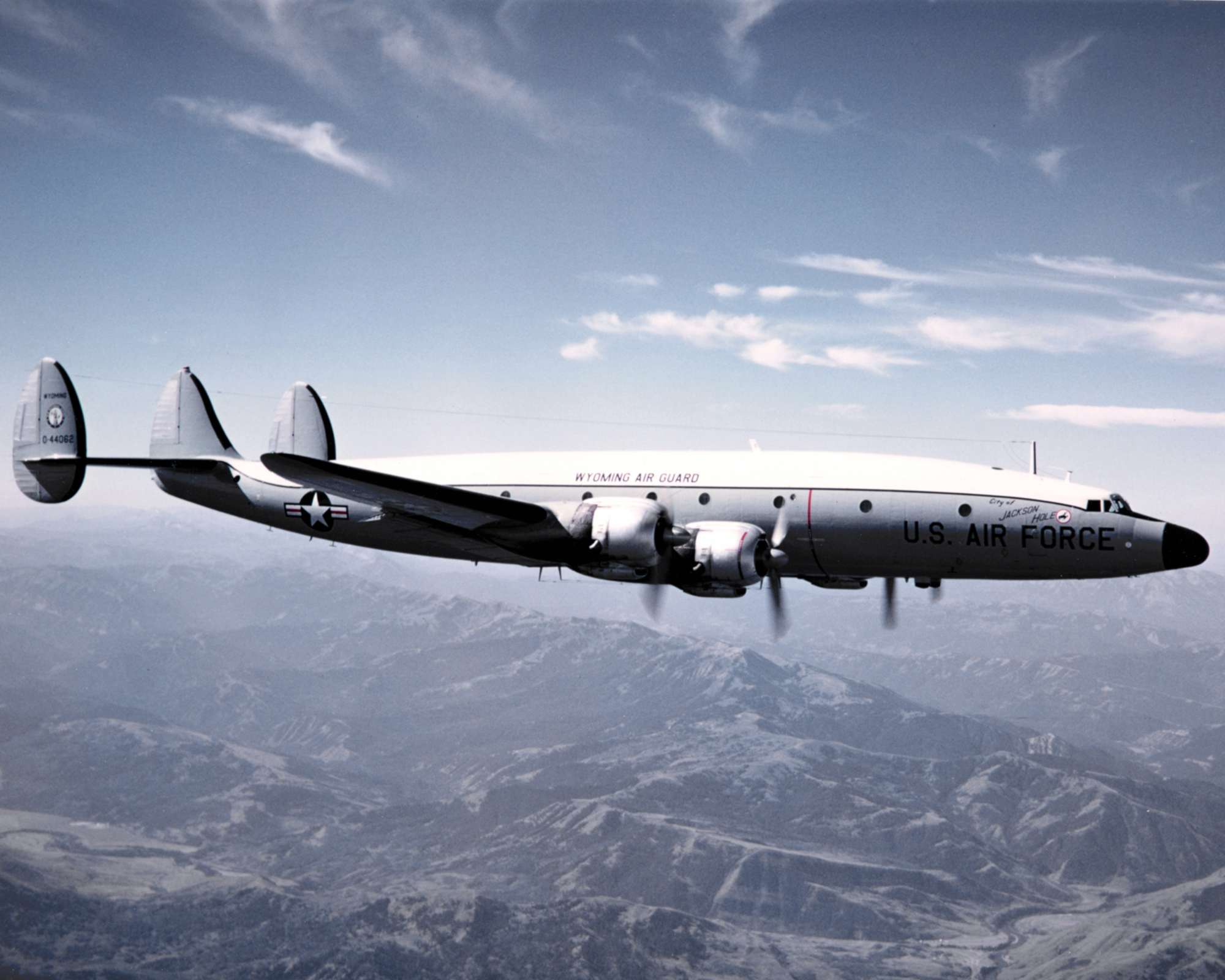
Air National Guard C-121

The squadron was established and federally recognized at Newark Municipal Airport, New Jersey, on 1 February 1956. It was initially equipped with Curtiss C-46 Commando aircraft, performing transport missions from Newark in the northeast. In 1963, it retired the C-46 and was re-equipped with the Lockheed C-121 Constellation long-distance transport, primarily for passenger movements to Europe, also flew to the Caribbean and to Japan, Thailand, South Vietnam, Australia and the Philippines during the Vietnam War. In 1965, the unit relocated to McGuire Air Force Base, New Jersey.

The Constellations were retired in 1973, being replaced with the de Havilland Canada C-7 Caribou light transport, which was withdrawn from service in the Vietnam War. The C-7s were used for carrying small payloads in combat areas with rough airstrips.

=== Air refueling operations ===
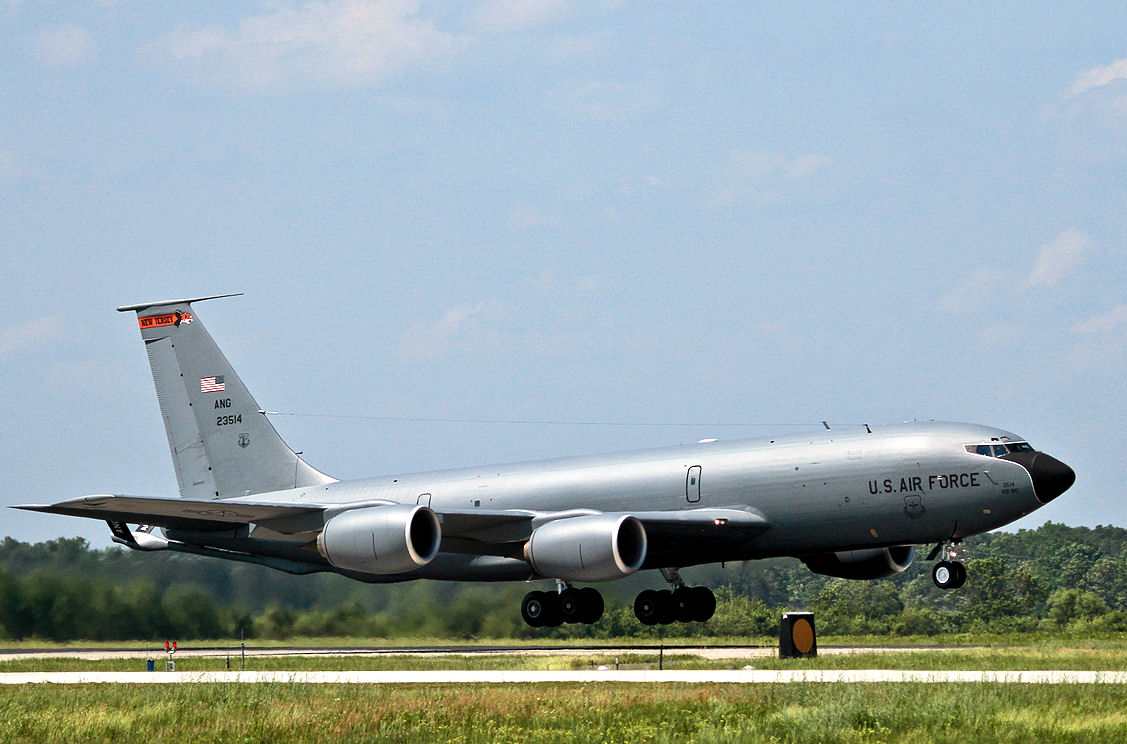
150th Air Refueling Squadron KC-135 Stratotanker

In 1977, upon receipt of Boeing KC-135 Stratotankers, the unit became the 150th Air Refueling Squadron. It was the first air refueling unit in the United States to launch tankers to establish the U.S.-Saudi Arabia "Air Bridge" during Operations Desert Shield and Desert Storm. Hours after President Bush ordered U.S. forces to the Persian Gulf, 150th aircrews were refueling fighters and cargo transports winging their way nonstop from the U.S. to the Persian Gulf. Shortly thereafter, and again, prior to certain units personnel being activated, the 150th deployed aircraft, aircrews, maintenance and support personnel to Saudi Arabia. It also provided urgently needed medical, security police and support personnel to U.S. air bases to assist active duty personnel and serve as "back-fill" for those already rushed to the combat theater.

On 1 October 1993, the squadron's parent 170th Air Refueling Group was inactivated and its components transferred to or consolidated with the parent 108th Air Refueling Wing at McGuire under the Objective Wing organization. The 150th was assigned to the 108th Operations Group as its second KC-135 Squadron (along with the 141st Air Refueling Squadron).

In September 1994, for over 30 days, five aircraft and 300 squadron members deployed to Pisa International Airport, Italy for Operation Deny Flight. Supported by 15 active duty Air Force personnel, the squadron was the first Air National Guard unit to take full responsibility during that period.

The squadron was inactivated in 2008, as the Air Force retired the KC-135E from the inventory.

=== Special operations ===
The squadron was reactivated from the previous 227th Special Operations Flight and equipped with the Boeing C-32 for special operations. It was operational by August 2015, when a loadmaster with the squadron was photographed as part of military involvement in a TV show.

The squadron's mission is to "provide dedicated rapid response airlift to the Department of Defense in support of United States Government crisis response events domestic and abroad." These include responses to terrorist incidents. Its aircraft do not carry standard United States Air Force markings, and the serial/registration numbers they display are subject to change. At the rear of the cabin, the usual cargo space in the hold has been reconfigured to accommodate enlarged fuel tanks, extending the aircraft's unrefueled maximum range to 6000 nautical miles. The aircraft have also been given an air refueling capability and a satellite communications package.

== Lineage ==
- Constituted as the 150th Air Transport Squadron, Light and allotted to the Air National Guard c. 1956

Extended federal recognition and activated, 1 February 1956
Redesignated 150th Aeromedical Evacuation Transport Squadron, Light on 1 February 1957
Redesignated 150th Air Transport Squadron, Heavy on 10 December 1963
Redesignated 150th Military Airlift Squadron on 1 January 1966
Redesignated 150th Aeromedical Airlift Squadron c. 1 December 1969
Redesignated 150th Tactical Airlift Squadron on 22 June 1973
Redesignated 150th Air Refueling Squadron, Heavy on 1 April 1977
Redesignated 150th Air Refueling Squadron c. 16 March 1992

- Redesignated 150th Special Operations Squadron

Activated unknown

=== Assignments ===
- 108th Fighter-Interceptor Wing, 1 February 1956
- 106th Aeromedical Transport Group, 1 September 1958
- 170th Air Transport Group (later 170th Military Airlift Group, 170th Aeromedical Airlift Group, 170th Tactical Airlift Group, 170th Air Refueling Group), 18 January 1964
- 108th Operations Group, 30 September 1993 – 2008
- 108th Operations Group, unknown – present

=== Stations ===
- Newark Municipal Airport, New Jersey, 1 February 1956
- McGuire Air Force Base, New Jersey, 1 July 1965 – 31 March 2008; Unknown-present

=== Aircraft ===
- Curtiss C-46 Commando, 1956-1962
- Douglas C-47 Skytrain, 1956
- Lockheed C-121 Constellation, 1963-1973
- de Havilland Canada C-7 Caribou, 1973-1977
- Convair C-131 Samaritan, 1977
- Boeing KC-135E Stratotanker, 1977–2008
- Boeing C-32B Gatekeeper, unknown – present
