= Comco =

Aircraft operator in the United States

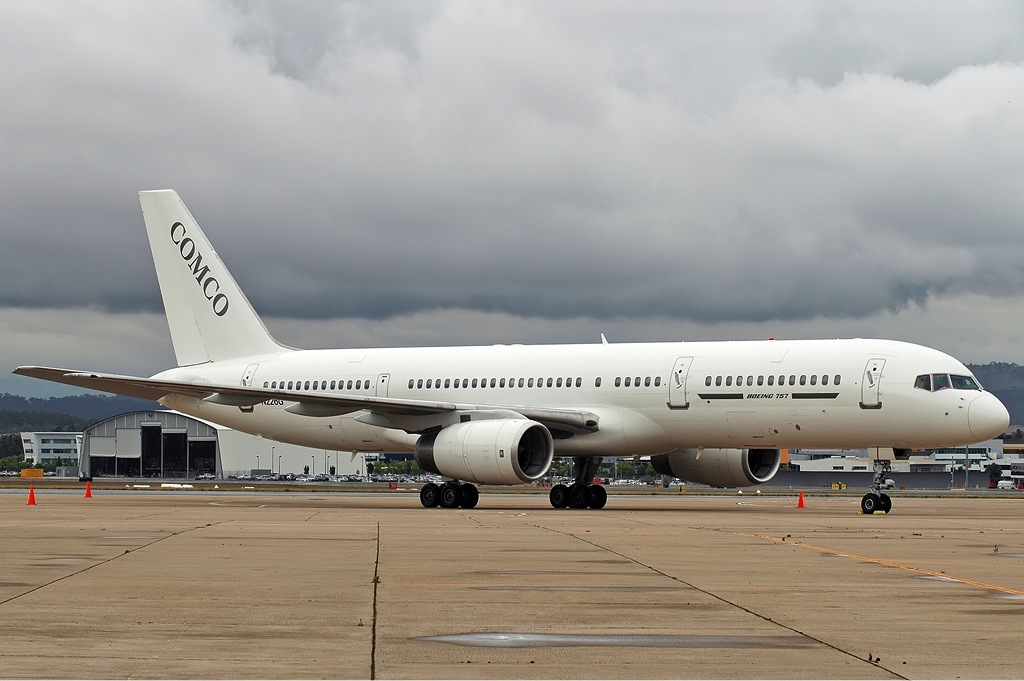
- Founded: 2002
- Fleet size: 2
- Destinations: Global
- Parent company: L3Harris Technologies
- Headquarters: Helena, Montana

Comco is the de facto name of an American company operating two Boeing 757 aircraft.

== Overview ==
Little is known about the exact nature of their operation, but the aircraft are believed to operate on behalf of the United States Department of Defense.

The aircraft are painted white, and have either the word COMCO on the tail or stylized blue sweeps on the tail, fuselage, and engine cowling. The Federal Aviation Administration (FAA) registry lists the owner of the aircraft as L-3 Capital.

When parked and unused, the aircraft have padlocks which seal each of the exits, a highly unusual modification for an aircraft of its type and size.

== Fleet ==
As of June 2019, Comco operates 2 Boeing 757-200s, which both aircraft are operating in the defense segment of L3Harris. Both aircraft are powered by the Rolls-Royce RB-211. Until 2016, the planes used by Comco only had a black Comco lettering on the vertical stabilizer, with a partial black cheatline forward of the wing and "Boeing 757" in small lettering beneath the aft windows. In 2017, the lettering was replaced by small navy and teal swoosh graphics, and the Rolls-Royce logos on the engine nacelles were removed.

== Incidents ==
In 2003, a Comco aircraft, registration N610G, was forced to land after being intercepted by aircraft from the Indian Air Force after it strayed into Indian airspace on a flight from Karachi to Malé.
