= Domestic Emergency Support Team =

The Domestic Emergency Support Team (DEST) is a rapidly deployable, interagency team of experts within the United States government, staffed from the Federal Bureau of Investigation (FBI), the Federal Emergency Management Agency (FEMA), the Department of Defense (DoD), the Department of Energy (DOE), the Department of Health and Human Services (HHS), and the Environmental Protection Agency (EPA). The DEST provides guidance to the FBI Special Agent in Charge (SAC) concerning weapons of mass destruction (WMD) threats and actual incidents/attacks.

== Deployment ==
The FBI director, in consultation with the attorney general and the secretary of homeland security, requests that the National Security Council Deputies Committee activate and launch the DEST for on-scene advice that can include nuclear, biological, and chemical expertise. The secretary of defense authorizes the deployment of the DEST aircraft and all DoD personnel assigned to the team. It is the responsibility of DoD to provide transportation for the DEST.

== Concept of operation ==
The DEST is incorporated directly into the existing on-site FBI crisis management structure to advise the On Scene Commander (OSC) of federal-level capabilities that can be brought to bear on the incident. Besides providing interagency crisis management assistance, the DEST can provide information management support and enhanced communications to ensure the OSC maintains connectivity with national-level decision makers during the ongoing crisis. The DEST also can be organized to provide the expert advice required for certain explosive devices and their components including chemical, biological, nuclear, and radiological dispersal devices. Technical expertise and equipment is also available to operate in a contaminated environment in order to conduct on-site activities like threat sampling, technical measurements, tactical intelligence collection, evidence collection, and other actions.

== Team members ==
=== National Nuclear Security Administration ===
A Nuclear/Radiological Advisory Team deploys as part of an FBI/FEMA-led Domestic Emergency Support Team (DEST) to provide nuclear scientific and technical advice to the lead federal agency.

=== Other agencies ===
Specialized assistance is available from other federal, state, or local agencies such as the Departments of Transportation and Agriculture.

== History ==
The Domestic Emergency Support Team was originally created under Presidential Decision Directive 39 (PDD 39), "U.S. Policy on Counterterrorism," signed by President Bill Clinton on June 21, 1995. That document called for a "rapidly deployable interagency emergency support team" to assist the Federal Bureau of Investigation (FBI) during domestic terrorist events involving the use of chemical, biological, radiological, nuclear, or explosive weapons.
