= Wude Airfield =

Military airfield in Taiwan

Wude Airfield
- Penghu County in Taiwan

Site information
- Owner: Ministry of National Defense
- Operator: Imperial Japanese Army Air Service; Republic of China Air Force
- Open to the public: No

Location
- Location of Wude Airfield within Taiwan
- Coordinates: 23°31′04″N 119°35′03″E

Site history
- Built: 1936; 90 years ago
- In use: 1937 - 1957
- Fate: Abandoned
- Battles/wars: Pacific War

Garrison information
- Occupants: 30th Air Base Unit

Airfield information
- Elevation: 17 metres (56 ft) AMSL
Runways
Direction	Length and surface
04/22	2,050 metres (6,726 ft)

Wude Airfield, also known as Zhumushui Airfield, was a military airport located in the southwest tip of Penghu Island in Penghu County, Taiwan. It was built in 1936 and was used by the Imperial Japanese Army Air Service until the end of World War II in 1945, and the Republic of China Air Force assumed control until 1957 when it was replaced by the newer Penghu Airport.

== History ==
Initially, during the Japanese rule of Taiwan, Penghu was served by Anshan Airfield, which was located in the Chetian Island area and was equipped with a 600 meter long and 200 meter wide gravel runway. It was intended for usage by a navy light aviation squadron. By the late 1930s, in response to wartime needs, the Japanese military began strengthening Taiwan's defenses. As Penghu was the closest territory to mainland China, and because Anshan Airfield became inadequate, plans were conceived for another airfield.

A site was chosen on the southwest tip of Penghu Island, and work began in 1936. The land was gradually requisitioned and leveled, and after a year of work, construction was completed on 21 September, 1937. The airfield was named Zhumushui Airfield, which consisted of a 3,600-foot long and 1,500-foot wide sandy landing ground running north–south. It was intended for operations of the Imperial Japanese Army Air Service (IJAAS). On the outer edge of the road consisted two aircraft hangar factories, an administrative building, several barracks, various ancillary structures, and an ammunition depot. Located northeast of the airfield, a Naval Aviation Communication and Liaison Station was built as a communications command hub. In addition, there were six semi-circular open-air aircraft shelters around the landing site. Later, the Japanese army internally designated the airfield as "No. 30 Base Airfield", as it was occupied by the 30th Air Base Unit. Following completion, the old Anshan Airfield was abandoned.

=== World War II ===
In April 1943, the 30th Air Base Unit reported that there were 5 Nakajima B5N torpedo bombing planes and 3 Mitsubishi G3M attack planes, which was replaced by Nakajima B5N planes and an unknown amount of Tianship-type ship critique aircraft. By May 1944, the air base unit was under jurisdiction of the Kaohsiung Garrison. With the advancement of the Pacific War, the United States Army Air Forces conducted air raids on Zhumushui Airfield. Primarily when on October 12 to 14, 1944 during the Taiwan Rush Air Battle, Zhumushui Airfield was heavily bombed by a large-scaled air raid by the 383rd Task Force of the US Army. Between January and February 1945, the 901st Naval Air Force Magong Dispatch Team was stationed. On April 8, 1945, the 498th, 499th, 500th, and 501st squadrons of the 345th Bombardment Wing of the Fifth Air Force deployed 25 B-25J medium bombers to attack the Japanese fleet off the coast of Shantou.

=== Post War ===
At the end of World War II, the IJAAC withdrew from Zhumushui Airfield, and the Republic of Chinese government (ROC) subsequently took over, renaming it as Wude Airfield. The airfield was then occupied by the Republic of China Air Force. In June 1946, it was reported that the airport had nine fuel depots, one pump station, two bomb depots, two aircraft hangars, one signal receiving station, one power station, one repair workshop, one letter station, and one power supply station. In the barracks included command posts, rest rooms, official quarters, a pump house, a garage, a kitchen, a bathroom, a toilet, and a guard's house. On the northeast side of the airfield was the original aviation communication laison station built by the Japanese Navy, which was changed into the General Aviation Squadron and Weather Center to continue operations mainland.

== Closure ==
By the 1950s, the ROC required a larger airfield for jet aircraft and heavier transports. After the completion of the new Penghu Airport in the Huxi township in 1957, the Penghu Air Force subsequently relocated there from Wude Airfield in 1964, under orders of the government. Following the move, an army garrison was stationed at Wude Airport. Today, Wude Airfield remains under control of the Penghu Defense Command's Wude Camp of the Ministry of National Defense. As a result of restrictive access to the former airfield, its history has become little known.

A concrete decoy cannon exists today, known as the Wude Fake Cannon. It was not built by the Japanese army during World War II in 1941, and did not attract US aircraft to drop bombs. During the Japanese colonial period, the Washington Naval Treaty was signed in 1922, restricting construction of naval bases and fortresses in the Pacific region. The battery was forced to discontinue construction. However, in 1923, the Penghu Island Fortress Command secretly built two fake turrets in the area with approval of the minister of war, making them mistakenly believe that they had been completed before the signing of the contract. While the plan intended real guns to be reinstalled afterwards, this was never rather facilitated.
