= 500th Bombardment Squadron =

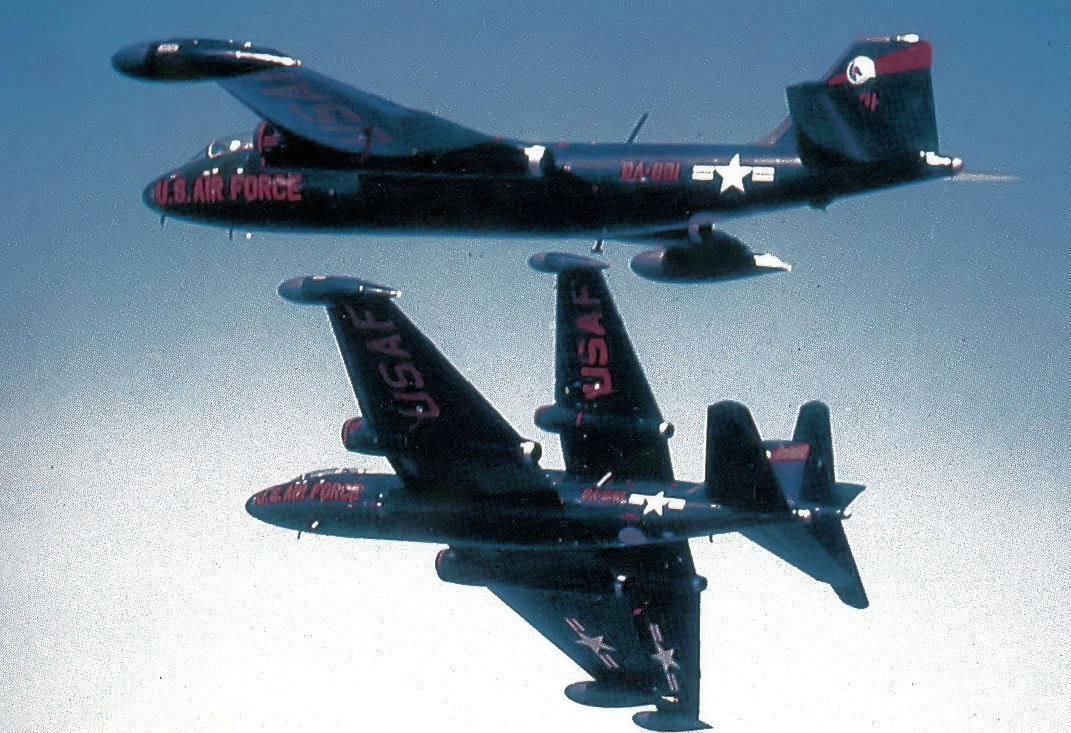
- 345th Bombardment Wing B-57B Canberras
- Active: 1942–1945; 1954–1959
- Country: United States
- Branch: United States Air Force
- Role: Medium bomber
- Nickname: Rough Raiders
- Engagements: Southwest Pacific Theater
- Decorations: Distinguished Unit Citation; Philippine Presidential Unit Citation

Insignia
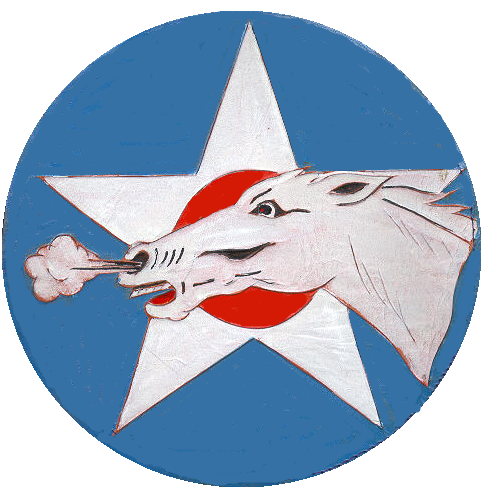
- 500th Bombardment Squadron emblem (Note: Approved 10 August 1954. Although this emblem was not approved until 1954, the squadron used it in the Southwest Pacific instead of the one officially approved for the squadron in 1943. Description: Over a white star, with a red circular center, is placed the head and neck of a white charging stallion, outlined in dark brown, emitting steam and fire from its nostrils. The reddened fire is also shown in the leading portion of the eye pupil. The entire design is place over a true blue circular field, piped white, bordered true blue.)

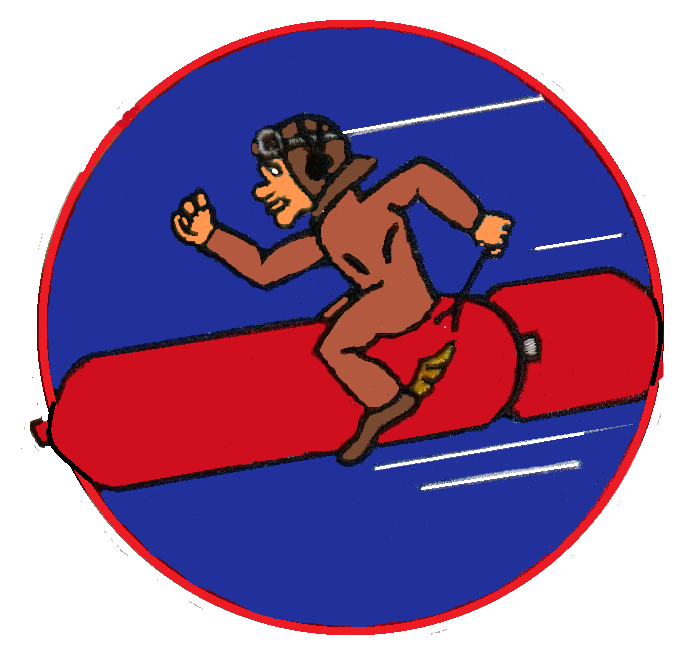
- 500th Bombardment Squadron emblem (Note: Approved 13 May 1943.)

The 500th Bombardment Squadron is an inactive United States Air Force unit. It was last assigned to the 345th Bombardment Wing at Langley Air Force Base, Virginia, where it was inactivated on 25 June 1959.

The squadron was first activated in 1942 for service during World War II. After training in the United States as a medium bomber unit, it deployed to the Southwest Pacific Theater, where it engaged in combat against Japanese forces, advancing from Australia, through New Guinea and the Philippines, earning two Distinguished Unit Citations and a Philippine Presidential Unit Citation for its combat actions. Following V-J Day, the squadron remained on Okinawa until December 1945, when it returned to the United States for inactivation. The squadron was activated again in 1954 as a tactical bomber unit.

== History ==
=== World War II ===
The squadron was first organized at Columbia Army Air Base, South Carolina in September 1942 as one of the four original squadrons of the 345th Bombardment Group. However, it was not sufficiently manned to begin flight training until December. The squadron trained with North American B-25 Mitchell medium bombers until April 1943, when it departed for the Southwest Pacific Theater. The squadron had originally been slated for deployment to the European Theater of Operations, but was diverted to the Pacific at the request of General George C. Kenney following the successful use of medium bombers in the Battle of the Bismarck Sea.

Staging through Australia, the unit reached its combat station near Port Moresby, New Guinea in early June 1943. In theater, its B-25s were modified, including the installation of additional fixed machine guns to equip it for strafing missions. It flew its first combat mission on 30 June. The squadron operated from New Guinea until July 1944, with missions that included bombing and strafing Japanese installations in New Guinea and the Bismarck Archipelago. The squadron attacked enemy shipping in sealanes within range of its Mitchells. It flew air support missions for ground units in the Admiralty Islands, including airdropping supplies to units. It also flew courier and aerial reconnaissance missions.

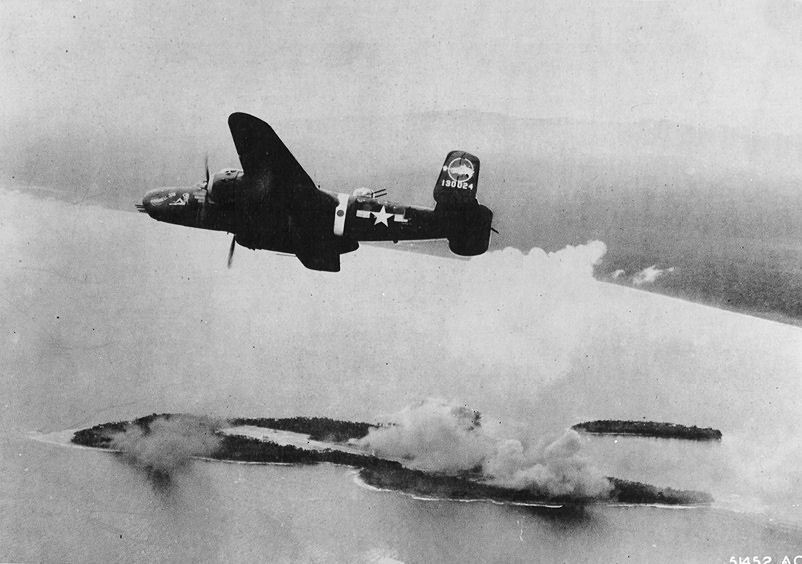
500th Squadron B-25 Mitchell over Wakde Island (Note: Aircraft is North American B-25D-5-NA Mitchell, serial 41-30024 "Pannell Job". Taken on 11 May 1944. Note use of an early version of the emblem approved in 1954 as a tail marking. This plane was lost west of Nadzab on 11 June 1944. Baugher, Joe (16 April 2023). "1941 USAF Serial Numbers". Joe Baugher.)

On 2 November 1943, the squadron flew a series of attacks on flak positions, coastal defenses and barracks at Rabaul, a major Japanese naval base in New Britain. These attacks earned the squadron its second Distinguished Unit Citation, following an award the previous month for action in New Britain. In July 1944, the 500th moved to Biak Island in the Netherlands East Indies. From its new base, it attacked airfields and shipping in the Philippines and Celebes. It continued moving forward with Douglas MacArthur's forces, occupying a base in the Philippines in November 1944, which enabled it to strike military targets throughout the island nation and strike industrial targets as far north as Formosa.

In July 1945, the squadron moved to Ie Shima Airfield in the Ryuku Islands, from which it was able to attack shipping in the Sea of Japan and carry out a few raids on Kyushu. Following V-J Day, the squadron remained at Ie Shima until December, when it returned to the United States and was inactivated at the port of embarkation on 19 December 1945.

=== Tactical Air Command ===
The squadron was reactivated at Langley Air Force Base, Virginia in July 1954 when its parent 345th Bombardment Group replaced the 4400th Bombardment Group there. The squadron was initially equipped with some of the 4400th's Douglas B-26 Invaders, pending the delivery of its Martin B-57B Canberra jet bombers. The squadron trained to maintain combat proficiency in locating, attacking, and destroying targets from all altitudes and under all conditions of weather and light. It was inactivated at Langley on 25 June 1959 in connection with the phaseout of the Canberra from Tactical Air Command.

== Lineage ==
- Constituted as the 500th Bombardment Squadron (Medium) on 3 September 1942

Activated on 8 September 1942
Redesignated 500th Bombardment Squadron, Medium in 1944
Inactivated on 19 December 1945
Redesignated 500th Bombardment Squadron, Tactical on 22 March 1954
Activated on 19 July 1954
Inactivated on 25 June 1959

=== Assignments ===
- 345th Bombardment Group, 8 September 1942 – 19 December 1945
- 345th Bombardment Group, 19 July 1954
- 345th Bombardment Wing, 8 October 1957 – 25 June 1959

=== Stations ===
- Columbia Army Air Base, South Carolina, 8 September 1942
- Walterboro Army Air Field, South Carolina, 6 March – 16 April 1943
- Jackson Airfield (7 Mile Drome), New Guinea, 5 June 1943
- Dobodura Airfield Complex, New Guinea, 1 January 1944
- Nadzab Airfield Complex, New Guinea, 23 February 1944
- Mokmer Airfield, Biak, Netherlands East Indies, c. 23 July 1944
- Dulag Airfield, Leyte, Philippines (operated from Mokmer Airfield), c. 10 November 1944
- Tacloban Airfield, Leyte, Philippines, 27 December 1944
- San Marcelino Airfield, Luzon, Philippines, 12 February 1945
- Clark Field, Luzon, Philippines, c. 10 May 1945
- Ie Shima Airfield, Ryuku Islands, 27 July – 1 December 1945
- Fort Lewis, Washington, 17–19 December 1945
- Langley Air Force Base, Virginia, 19 July 1954 – 25 June 1959

=== Aircraft ===
- North American B-25 Mitchell, 1942–1945
- Douglas B-26 Invader, 1954–1955
- Martin B-57B Canberra, 1955–1959

=== Awards and campaigns ===
Award streamer	Award	Dates	Notes
	Distinguished Unit Citation	18 October 1943	New Britain
	Distinguished Unit Citation	2 November 1943	Rabaul
	Philippine Presidential Unit Citation	12 November 1944 – c. 20 July 1945	

Campaign Streamer	Campaign	Dates	Notes
	Air Offensive, Japan	5 June 1943 – 2 September 1945	
	China Defensive	5 June 1943 – 4 May 1945	
	New Guinea	5 June 1943 – 31 December 1944	
	Bismarck Archipelago	15 December 1943 – 27 November 1944	
	Leyte	17 October 1944 – 1 July 1945	
	Luzon	15 December 1944 – 4 July 1945	
	Western Pacific	17 April 1945 – 2 September 1945	
	China Offensive	5 May 1945 – 2 September 1945	
