= 341st Fighter Squadron =

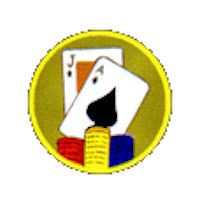
- Active: 1942–1946
- Country: United States
- Branch: United States Army Air Forces
- Role: Fighter

The 341st Fighter Squadron is an inactive United States Air Force unit. It was last assigned to the 348th Fighter Group, based at Itami Air Base, Japan. It was inactivated on 10 May 1946.

It was allocated to the New Jersey Air National Guard and redesignated as the 141st Fighter Squadron on 24 May 1946.

== History ==
=== Lineage ===
- Constituted 341th Fighter Squadron on 24 September 1942

Activated on 30 September 1942
Inactivated on to May 1946.

=== Assignments ===
- 348th Fighter Group, 30 September 1942 – 10 May 1946

=== Stations ===
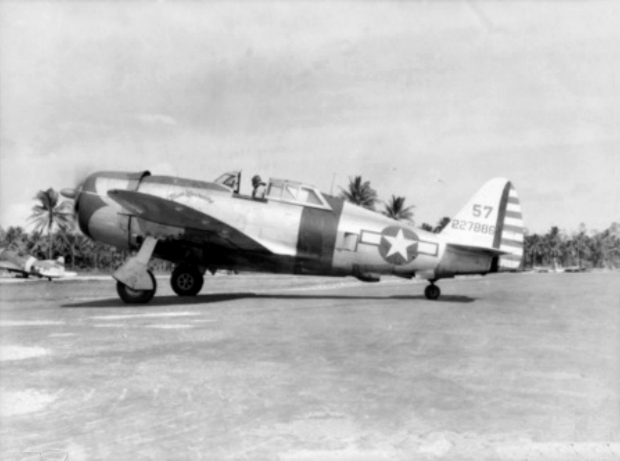
A 341st FS P-47D at Morotai, in January 1945.

- Mitchel Field, New York, 30 September 1942
- Bradley Field, Connecticut, 30 September 1942
- Westover Field, Massachusetts, 30 October 1942
- Hillsgrove AAF, Rhode Island, 23 January 1943
- Westover Field, Massachusetts, 26 April – 9 May 1943
- Jackson Airfield (7 Mile Drome), Port Moresby, New Guinea, 23 June 1943
- Finschafen Airfield (Dreger Field), New Guinea, 13 December 1943
- Saidor Airfield, New Guinea, 13 March 1944
- Wakde Airfield, Wakde, Netherlands East Indies, 26 May 1944
- Kornasoren (Yebrurro) Airfield Noemfoor, Netherlands East Indies, 24 August 1944
- Tacloban Airfield, Leyte, Philippines, 30 November 1944
- Tanauan Airfield, Leyte, Philippines, 14 December 1944
- San Marcelino Airfield, Luzon, Philippines, 4 February 1945
- Floridablanca Airfield (Basa Air Base), Luzon, Philippines, c. 15 May 1945
- Ie Shima Airfield, Okinawa, 9 July 1945
- Kanoya Airfield, Japan, 9 September 1945
- Itami Airfield, Japan, c. 20 October 1945 – 10 May 1946.

=== Aircraft ===
- P-47 Thunderbolt, 1942–1945
- P-51 Mustang, 1945.

=== Operational history ===
Combat in Southwest and Western Pacific, 30 July 1943 – 15 August 1945.
