= KRBW =

KRBW may refer to:

- KRBW (FM), a radio station (90.5 FM) licensed to Ottawa, Kansas, United States
- Lowcountry Regional Airport in Walterboro, South Carolina, United States
