= Ie Shima Airfield =

U.S. Marine Corps facility in Japan

Ie Shima Airfield 伊江島補助飛行場
- Ie Shima, Ryukyu Islands, Japan
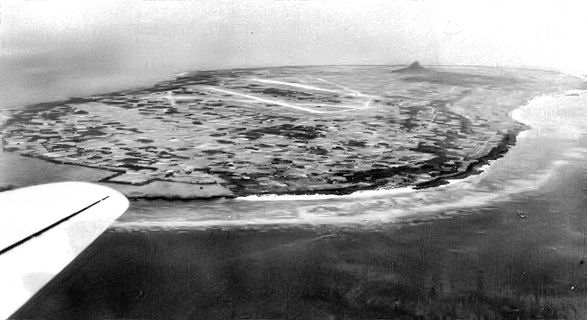
- Aerial photo of Ie Shima Island, off the northwest coast of Okinawa, 1945 looking east over the 77th Division landing beaches, toward the Pinnacle.

Site information
- Type: Military airfield Complex
- Controlled by: United States Marine Corps

Location
- Coordinates: 26°43′23.20″N 127°46′40.78″E

Site history
- Built: Prior to April 1945
- In use: 1945–1946

Ie Shima Auxiliary Airfield (伊江島補助飛行場, Iejima Hojo Hikōjō) is a training facility, managed by the United States Marine Corps and a former World War II airfield complex on Ie Shima, an island located off the northwest coast of Okinawa Island in the East China Sea. The airfield as such was inactivated after 1946 but part of the former airfield is still used as a training facility for parachute drops and vertical take off and landing aircraft such as the F-35. The facility is referenced as FAC6005 by Okinawa Prefecture.

== History ==
=== Invasion and construction ===
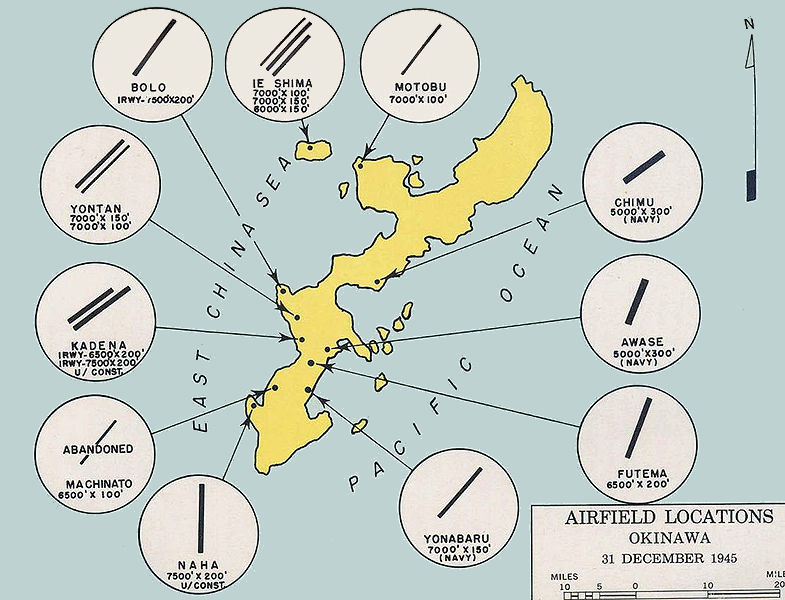
Location of Ie Shima Airfield

The airfields on Ie Shima were built by the Japanese prior to the American invasion and subsequent Battle of Okinawa in April 1945. It was seized by elements of the United States Army 77th Infantry Division after intermittent bombardment of the island by the United States Navy Fifth Fleet from 25 March through 16 April when the invasion of the island commenced. The island was not declared secure until 24 April.

Prior to the invasion, the Japanese commander on Okinawa, believing that Ie Shima could not be held for more than a few days, ordered that the airfields on the island be destroyed by the end of March 1945. Thorough demolitions followed. The runways were ditched and blasted and the entire central area sown with mines, as defense against possible airborne attack. The airfields were also mined by unused aerial bombs and mines made from drums of gasoline.

Base development proceeded rapidly once the mopping up was completed. Although initially delayed by the large number of mines, soldiers from the 805th Engineer Aviation Battalion, 1892nd Engineer Aviation Battalion, the 1902nd and the 1903rd Engineer Aviation Battalions, and several other engineering units quickly repaired the enemy airfields and began the construction of new runways, along with a series of interlinking taxiways, revetments, maintenance facilities along with a containment facility for personnel. The coral foundation of the island and the rubble of the town of Ie facilitated the work. There was ample room for dispersal area, and the sloping ground on the sides and ends of the central plateau provided space for housing base personnel. Japanese civilians were evacuated to Tokashiki in the Kerama Islands. Engineers discovered a large limestone basin on the north coast which produced 100,000 gallons of fresh water. Under these conditions work proceeded rapidly and by 10 May one fighter group was based on the island. By the middle of the month three runways were ready for operational use along with taxiways. In addition, radar and air warning facilities installed, although much construction work remained.

=== Operational units assigned ===
By 14 June three fighter groups and one night fighter squadron were operating from the airfield. As expected, Ie Shima proved to be an ideal base for the support of operations on Okinawa and for preparing later attacks on the Japanese homeland.

- Headquarters, 43d Bombardment Group, Fifth Air Force

B-24 Liberator, 26 July-10 November 1945

63d Bombardment Squadron, 25 July-10 December 1945
64th Bombardment Squadron, 26 July-10 December 1945
65th Bombardment Squadron, 24 July-10 December 1945

- Headquarters, 90th Bombardment Group, Fifth Air Force

B-24 Liberator, 10 August–December 1945

319th Bombardment Squadron, 12 August-23 November 1945
320th Bombardment Squadron, 10 August-23 November 1945
321st Bombardment Squadron, 15 August-23 November 1945
400th Bombardment Squadron, 11 August-23 November 1945

- Headquarters, 345th Bombardment Group, Fifth Air Force

B-25 Mitchell, 25 July-10 December 1945

498th Bombardment Squadron, 20 July-1 December 1945
499th Bombardment Squadron, 20 July-1 December 1945
500th Bombardment Squadron, 20 July-1 December 1945
501st Bombardment Squadron, 20 July-1 December 1945

- Headquarters, 71st Reconnaissance Group, Fifth Air Force

Various Aircraft, August-26 October 1945

17th Reconnaissance Squadron, 29 July-26 October 1945
82d Reconnaissance Squadron, 28 July-7 October 1945
110th Reconnaissance Squadron, 28 July-6 October 1945

- 28th Reconnaissance Squadron (Detachment) Seventh Air Force

Various Aircraft, 23 April-8 May 1945;14 May-21 June 1945

- Headquarters, 3d Air Commando Group, Fifth Air Force

P-51 Mustang, 9 August-27 October 1945

3d Fighter (Commando) Squadron, 9 August-27 October 1945

Squadron operated from Atsugi Airfield, Japan, 20 September-7 October 1945

4th Fighter (Commando) Squadron, 9 August-27 October 1945

Squadron operated from Atsugi Airfield, Japan, 20 September-7 October 1945

318th Troop Carrier Squadron, 25 August-7 September 1945, C-47 Skytrain

Squadron operated from Atsugi Airfield, Japan, 20 September-7 October 1945

- 67th Troop Carrier Squadron (433d Troop Carrier Group), Fifth Air Force

C-46 Commando, 9–25 September 1945

- 68th Troop Carrier Squadron (433d Troop Carrier Group), Fifth Air Force

C-46 Commando, 10–30 September 1945

- 70th Troop Carrier Squadron (433d Troop Carrier Group), Fifth Air Force

C-46 Commando, 15–30 September 1945

- Headquarters, 8th Fighter Group, Fifth Air Force

P-38 Lightning, 6 August-22 November 1945

35th Fighter Squadron, 9 August-21 November 1945
36th Fighter Squadron, 6 August-21 November 1945
80th Fighter Squadron, 5 August-25 November 1945

- Headquarters, 49th Fighter Group, Fifth Air Force

P-38 Lightning, 16 August-15 September 1945

7th Fighter Squadron, 17 August-15 September 1945
8th Fighter Squadron, 17 August-15 September 1945
9th Fighter Squadron, 16 August-15 September 1945

- Headquarters, 58th Fighter Group, Fifth Air Force

P-47 Thunderbolt, 10 July-26 October 1945

69th Fighter Squadron, 8 July-26 October 1945
310th Fighter Squadron, 9 July-26 October 1945
311th Fighter Squadron, 8 July-26 October 1945

- Headquarters, 318th Fighter Group, Twentieth/Eighth Air Force

P-47 Thunderbolt, 30 April–November 1945

19th Fighter Squadron, 30 April–November 1945
73d Fighter Squadron, 30 April–November 1945
333d Fighter Squadron, 30 April–November 1945

- Headquarters, 348th Fighter Group, Fifth Air Force

P-51 Mustang, 9 July–October 1945

340th Fighter Squadron, 9 July-9 September 1945
341st Fighter Squadron, 12 July-9 September 1945
460th Fighter Squadron, 25 July-24 NOv 1945

- Headquarters, 413th Fighter Group, Twentieth/Eighth Air Force

P-47 Thunderbolt, 19 May-10 November 1945

1st Fighter Squadron, 19 May-17 November 1945
21st Fighter Squadron, 10 May-21 November 1945
34th Fighter Squadron, 19 May-17 November 1945

- Headquarters, 475th Fighter Group, Fifth Air Force

P-38 Lightning, 8 August-23 September 1945

431st Fighter Squadron, 8 August-8 October 1945
432d Fighter Squadron, 8 August-28 September 1945
433d Fighter Squadron, 8 August-28 September 1945

- Headquarters, 507th Fighter Group, Twentieth/Eighth Air Force

P-47 Thunderbolt, 29 July 1945 – 29 January 1946

463d Fighter Squadron, 24 June 1945 – 29 January 1946
464th Fighter Squadron, 24 June 1945 – 29 January 1946
465th Fighter Squadron, 24 June 1945 – 29 January 1946

- 421st Night Fighter Squadron (315th Composite Wing), 24 July-25 November 1945, P-61 Black Widow
- 547th Night Fighter Squadron (V Fighter Command), 13 August-7 October 1945, P-61 Black Widow
- 548th Night Fighter Squadron (Seventh Air Force), 8 June-1 December 1945, P-61 Black Widow
- 549th Night Fighter Squadron (Seventh Air Force), 8 June-1 December 1945, P-61 Black Widow
- Headquarters, 301st Fighter Wing, 31 July-29 November 1945
- 160th Liaison Squadron (308th Bombardment Wing), 15 August-22 September 1945, L-5, UC-64

=== Japanese Surrender Delegation ===
On 19 August 1945, two B-25Js of the 345th Bombardment Group and 80th Fighter Squadron P-38 Lightnings escorted two Japanese Mitsubishi G4M "Betty" bombers. The Japanese aircraft carried a delegation from Tokyo en route to Manila to meet General MacArthur's staff to work out details of the surrender.

The Betty bombers were painted white with green crosses on the wings, fuselage and vertical tail surface and use the call signs Bataan I and Bataan II. After the delegation landed at Ie Shima, they boarded a C-54 Skymaster and were flown to Manila. After the meeting, they returned to Ie Shima. One of the two Bettys crashed on its way back to Japan out of fuel, due to an incorrect conversion of liters to gallons when the bombers were refueled. The crew were helped by a local fisherman, and returned to Tokyo by train.

=== Postwar use ===
With the end of the war, many of the units assigned to Ie Shima were reassigned or inactivated. By the end of 1946, the facility was closed and placed in reserve status.

In the late 1950s the air station was used as a bomb gunnery range.

In March 1955, occurred what has been called the second Invasion of the island by the American military. After the expropriation of their lands and houses at gun-point, many local farmers were injured when trying pick up spent cartridges left by aircraft performing gunnery practice.

There were two Air Force units stationed on the island in the early 1960s. One was Detachment 1, 1962nd Communications Group which operated a radio receiver site. The other was a unit responsible for operating the 18th Tactical Fighter Wing's bomb gunnery range on the island. Although small, the base looked much like a full-fledged base which included barracks, mess hall, fire department, security guards and guard dogs, a small motor pool and even a Non-Commissioned Officers Club. Although the air force station had a usable runway which was occasionally used, transport of personnel and supplies to the island was on the local civilian ferry from Motobu Port on Okinawa.

In 1963 the island experienced a severe drought. For a while all the water wells on the island except for one dried up. That one well was on airfield property controlled by the U.S. Air Force. The officer in charge dispatched his fire department personnel to use the station's pumper truck to pick up water at the well and to distribute the water to several locations on the island. As a result, Air Force officials on Ie Shima and Okinawa received several letters of appreciation from local officials.

=== Current use ===
The American military still controlled roughly one third of the island in 2010. As of May 2019, according to the "Ie Island Guide Map" posted at the ferry landing, the American Military controls roughly 15% of the island as the "Ie Shima Training Facility," used primarily by the United States Marine Corps (USMC).

The three runways that were in use when World War II ended still exist. The United States military maintains the western runway as a small unimproved 5,000-foot (1,500 m) coral runway. It also has a simulated Landing helicopter assault (LHA) deck and a drop zone for parachute training, being part of a military training facility operated by the USMC. There is a detachment of usually less than 20 Marines which operates the range. F-35B operations have been conducted at the USMC facility. An admin and housing facility for personnel has been built at the Northern end of the derelict middle airstrip.

The eastern runway is now Iejima Airport and is used by a small civilian air carrier, and the central one is now abandoned and is used as a thoroughfare for residents to get from the north to the south side of the island.

The simulated LHA deck is used by Marine Wing Support Squadron 172, Marine Aircraft Group 36. The coral runway is also still in use for touch and go operations.

The Iejima Light House is located within the U.S. military fence line at the southwest end of the island. The USMC, along with the Japan Coast Guard, periodically hosts a memorial ceremony for the light keeper killed during the battle of Ie Shima in WWII.

== See also ==
- Naval Base Okinawa
