= Jarred V. Crabb =

US Army officer (1902–1981)

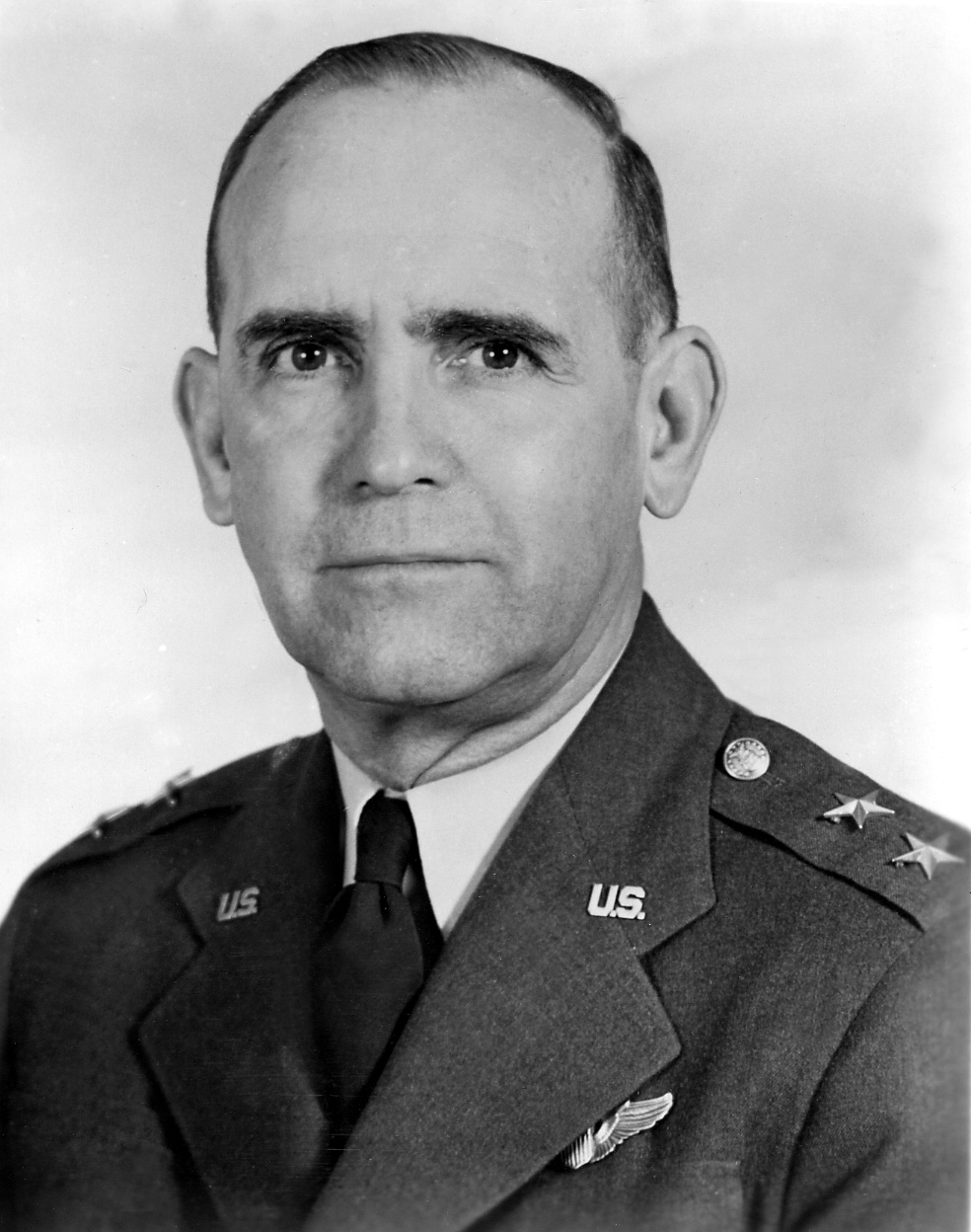
- Born: 18 September 1902; Olney, Illinois
- Died: 25 July 1981 (aged 78); Colorado Springs, Colorado
- Military career
- Branch: Air Corps; United States Air Force
- Service years: 1930–1961
- Rank: Major general
- Service number: O-17996/535A
- Commands: 14th Reconnaissance Squadron; Gander Army Air Base; 345th Bombardment Group; 314th Composite Wing; Thirteenth Air Force; 18th Fighter Wing; Central Air Defense Force
- Conflicts: World War II; New Guinea campaign; Philippines campaign; Occupation of Japan; Korean War
- Awards: Army Distinguished Service Medal; Air Force Distinguished Service Medal; Legion of Merit (2); Silver Star; Distinguished Flying Cross; Air Medal (2)

Jarred Vincent Crabb (18 September 1902 – 25 July 1981) was a United States Air Force major general. During the Second World War he commanded the V Bomber Command in the Southwest Pacific Area. During the Korean War, he was the Deputy Chief of Staff for Operations of the Far East Air Forces (FEAF) in Tokyo.

== Early life ==
Jarred Vincent Crabb was born in Olney, Illinois, on 18 September 1902. He attended Purdue University, from which he graduated with a Bachelor of Science degree in 1925.

== Between the wars ==
Crabb enlisted in the Army as a flying cadet on 21 February 1929. He underwent flight training at the Air Corps Primary Flying School at March Field, California, and the Air Corps Advanced Flying School at Kelly Field, Texas, and was commissioned as a second lieutenant in the United States Army Air Corps Reserve on 15 February 1930. He received a regular commission in the Air Corps on 8 May. Assigned to the 19th Composite Wing, based at Albrook Field in the Panama Canal Zone from 16 May 1933 to 30 June 1934, Crabb was a temporary first lieutenant from 15 March to 16 April 1935. He married Elisabeth Schelter; they had two children, also named Jarred and Elisabeth.

Promoted to the substantive rank of first lieutenant on 1 August 1935, Crabb served with the 27th Pursuit Squadron from September 1936 to January 1938, and the 21st Reconnaissance Squadron from September 1938 to January 1941. He was a temporary captain from 17 November 1935 to 16 June 1936 before being promoted to the substantive rank of captain on 8 May 1940. He became a temporary major on 21 March 1941 and a temporary lieutenant colonel on 5 January 1942. He commanded the 14th Reconnaissance Squadron, based at Miami Municipal Airport, from 15 January to 1 May 1941. From 1 May to 31 August 1941, he was in command of Gander Army Air Base in Newfoundland.

== World War II ==
On 27 January 1942, Crabb became the plans and training officer of the III Bomber Command at MacDill Field, Florida. He was promoted to temporary lieutenant colonel on 5 January 1942 and acting colonel on 1 March. He assumed command of the 345th Bombardment Group in Columbia, South Carolina, on 11 November 1942 and deployed with it to the Southwest Pacific Area.

On arrival in September 1943, he was reassigned to the V Bomber Command as its chief of staff. He was then assigned to the headquarters of the advanced echelon of the Fifth Air Force on 2 October. On 2 February 1944, he assumed command of the V Bomber Command, with the rank of brigadier general from 5 June 1944. He commanded it in operations for the rest of the war, relinquishing command only on 30 June 1946. He then briefly served as commander of the 314th Composite Wing in Japan from 1 to 29 July 1946.

For his service as commander of the V Bomber Command, Crabb was awarded the Distinguished Flying Cross on 26 May 1944, the Legion of Merit on 21 May 1945 and the Air Medal on 25 May 1944, with an oak leaf cluster on 9 June 1945.

== Post war ==
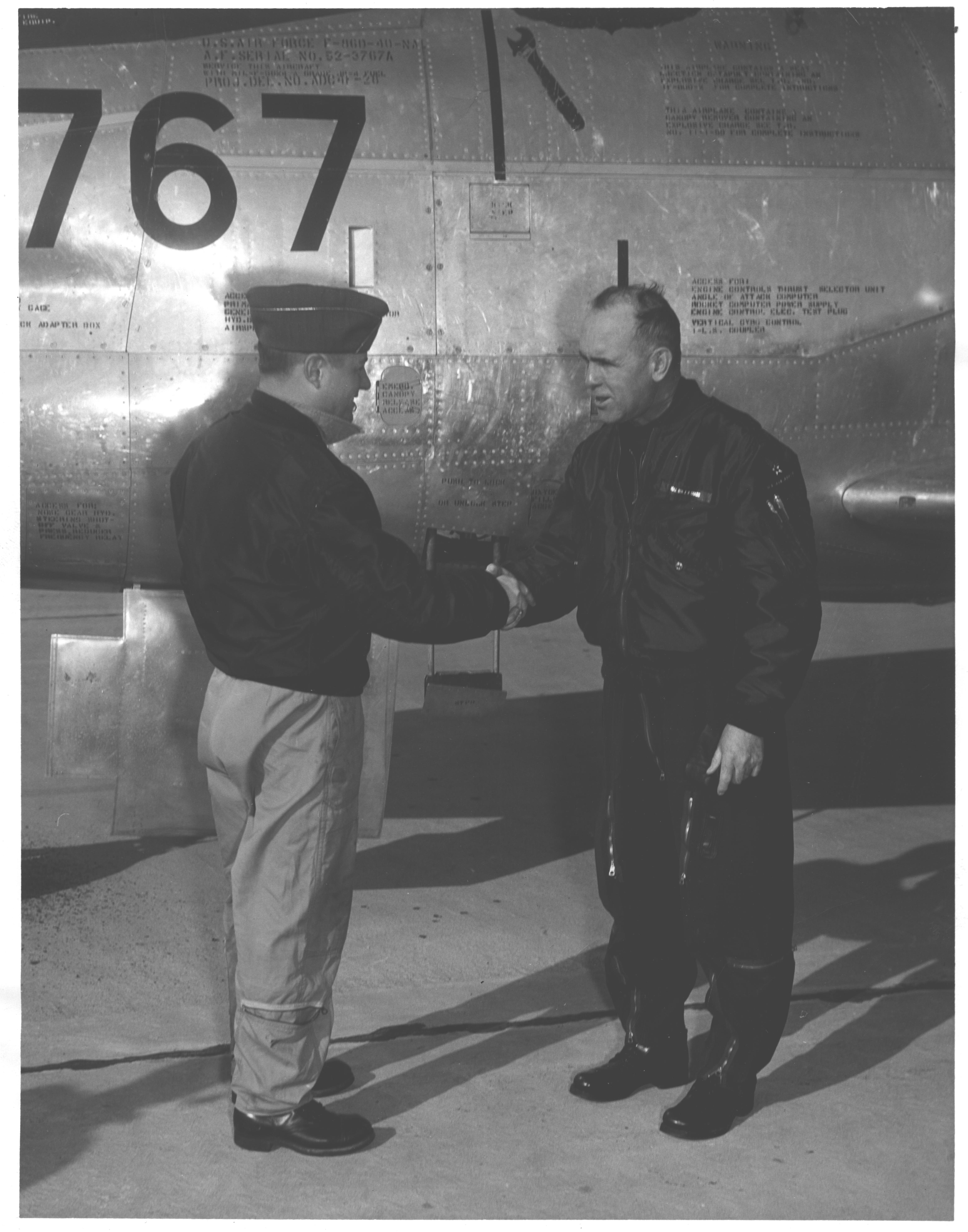
Crabb (right) shakes hands with Major Oscar R. Fladmark Jr. at Grandview Air Force Base, Missouri, circa 1955

Returning to the United States, Crabb became the deputy commander of the Ninth Air Force at Greenville, South Carolina, from 26 September 1946 to 19 November 1948. On transferring to the new United States Air Force on 8 May 1947, his substantive rank was still that of major, although he was advanced to colonel on 2 April 1948. He commanded the Thirteenth Air Force at Clark Air Force Base in the Philippines from 27 to 30 November 1948 and then the 18th Fighter Wing there from 1 December 1948 to 8 June 1949. He was deputy chief of staff for operations at Far East Air Forces in Tokyo during the Korean War from 20 June 1949 to 17 January 1952. He was promoted to the substantive rank of brigadier general in the Air Force in March 1953.

For his service with the Ninth and Thirteenth Air Forces and Far East Air Forces, Crabb was awarded the Air Force Distinguished Service Medal in the form of an oak leaf cluster to his Army Distinguished Service Medal. His service in Korea also garnered an award of the Silver Star on 14 December 1950. His citation noted that "At great personal risk and in constant danger from enemy ground and aerial attack, General Crabb made repeated troops to the most forward air bases."

From 24 January 1952 to 23 July 1954, Crabb was chief of staff of the Air Defense Command at Ent Air Force Base in Colorado. He then assumed command of Central Air Defense Force, with its headquarters at Richards-Gebaur Air Force Base in Missouri. His final assignment was as chief of staff of the Air Defense Command at Ent Air Force Base. He retired as a major general in July 1961. He was awarded an oak leaf cluster to his Lefion of Merit.

== Later life ==
Crabb died from a heart attack in Colorado Springs, Colorado, on 25 July 1961. His papers are held by the United States Air Force Academy.
