= 345th Bombardment Wing =

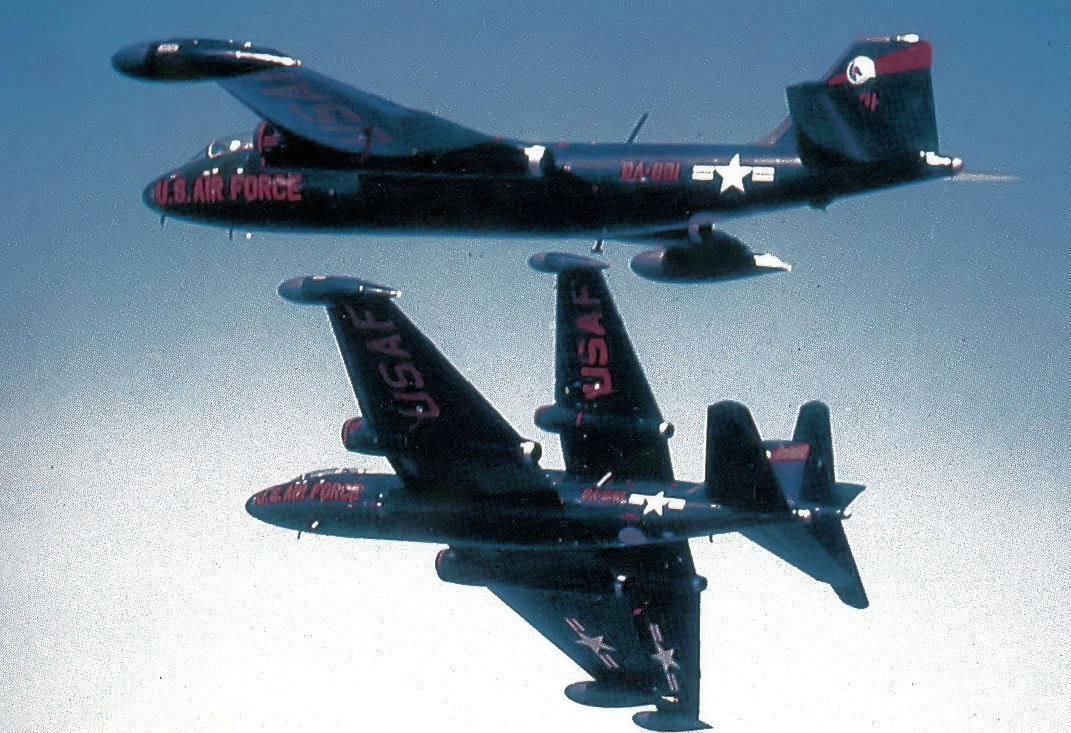
- 345th Bombardment Wing B-57B Canberras in 1957
- Active: 1942–1945; 1954–1957; 1957–1959
- Country: United States
- Branch: United States Air Force
- Role: Tactical bomber
- Nickname: Air Apaches

Insignia
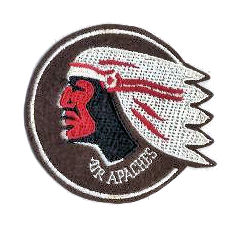
- 345th Bombardment Wing emblem (Note: approved for the 345th Bombardment Group 21 May 1954 and for the 345th Bombardment Wing 29 May 1958.)

The 345th Bombardment Group is an inactive United States Air Force unit. Its last assignment was with the Tactical Air Command at Langley Air Force Base, Virginia, where it was inactivated on 25 June 1959.

During World War II the 345th Bombardment Group operated in the Southwest Pacific Theater as a North American B-25 Mitchell medium bomber unit assigned to Fifth Air Force. It was awarded both the Distinguished Unit Citation and the Philippine Presidential Unit Citation for its combat service in New Guinea; the Bismarck Archipelago, Leyte; Luzon; the Southern Philippines and China.

== History ==
=== World War II ===
The group was activated on 11 November 1942, at Columbia Army Air Base, South Carolina, by Third Air Force order No. 275. The 498th, 499th, 500th, and 501st Bombardment Squadrons were assigned to it. The 345th started with 40 officers and 350 enlisted men, commanded by then Col. Jarred V. Crabb. Full strength, the 345th would contain 250 officers and 1250 enlisted men. At Columbia and other training bases, the group trained for overseas duty with North American B-25 Mitchell medium bombers.

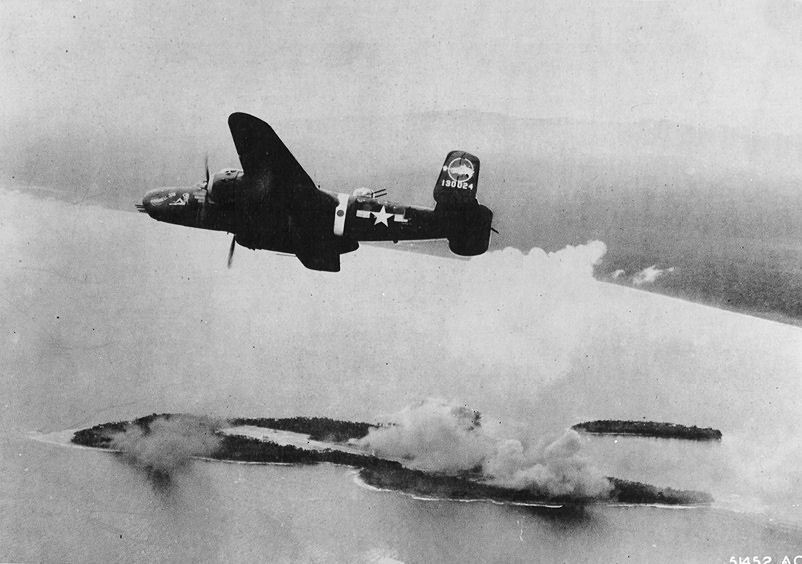
345th Bombardment Group B-25 Mitchell over Wakde Island

Moved to New Guinea, via Australia, April–June 1943, and assigned to Fifth Air Force. Entered combat on 30 June 1943. Operations until July 1944 included bombing and strafing Japanese airfields and installations in New Guinea and the Bismarck Archipelago; attacking shipping in the McCluer Gulf, Ceram Sea, and Bismarck Sea; supporting ground forces in the Admiralties; dropping supplies to ground troops; and flying courier and reconnaissance missions in the area. Received a Distinguished Unit Citation for a series of attacks against flak positions, shore installations, and barracks at Rabaul, New Britain, on 2 November 1943. Operated from Biak, July–November 1944, striking airfields and shipping in the southern Philippines and the Celebes. In November 1944 moved to the Philippines where targets included Japanese airfields and communications on Luzon, industries and communications on Formosa, and shipping along the China coast. After moving to Ie Shima in July 1945, flew some missions over Kyushu and the Sea of Japan. Selected to escort the Japanese surrender party from Japan to Ie Shima. It returned to the United States in December 1945 and was inactivated on 29 December 1945.

=== Tactical Air Command ===
==== 4400th Bombardment Group ====
The reactivation of the 345th had its roots on 1 August 1950, when Continental Air Command organized the 2215th Combat Crew Training Squadron at Langley Air Force Base, Virginia and assigned it to Tactical Air Command (TAC). The 2215th was organized to provide training on the Douglas B-26 Invader for crews headed for the Korean War. On 1 December 1950 TAC once more became a Major Command and the squadron was redesignated the 4440th Combat Crew Training Squadron.

As the need for trained B-26 crews expanded, the squadron became the 4400th Combat Crew Training Group on 12 March 1951 and was assigned the 4400th Training Squadron and the 4400th Maintenance Squadron. The following month, the federalized 115th, 117th and 122d Bombardment Squadrons of the Air National Guard, flying B-26s were assigned to the group. They were joined by the 115th Bombardment Squadron in December when it was relieved from attachment to the 47th Bombardment Wing. The three National Guard squadrons were returned to state control on 1 January 1953. They were replaced by the regular 423d, and 424th Bombardment Squadrons,

As the training mission wound down, the group became the 4400th Bombardment Group, Tactical (Training) on 16 January 1954 and became a placeholder for the planned activation of a Martin B-57 Canberra group at Langley. Its mission, personnel and equipment were transferred to the 345th Bombardment Group and the 4400th was discontinued on 19 July 1954.

==== 345th group and wing ====
When the 4400th was replaced by the 345th Bombardment Group, three of the group's four World War II squadrons were reactivated and the 424th squadron was reassigned to the 345th group. The same month, the first Martin B-57 Canberras accepted by the Air Force were assigned to the group. These were not bombers, but RB-57A reconnaissance models and were assigned for transition training in the Canberra. The group received its first true bomber, a B-57B before the end of the year.

Trained to maintain combat proficiency in locating, attacking, and destroying targets from all altitudes and under all conditions of weather and light. The service of the B-57 in tactical bomb groups was brief as the decision was made to phase out the B-57 in favor of supersonic tactical fighter-bombers. On 8 October 1957. In 1957, the group was inactivated when Tactical Air Command reorganized its wings under the dual deputy system and the 345th Bombardment Wing was simultaneously activated with the group's personnel and equipment.

The 345th BW was about to inactivate at Langley AFB when one of its squadrons had to be hastily deployed in July 1958 to Incirlik Air Base, commanded by Lt. Col. C. T. Garvin, in Turkey to make a show of force in response to a crisis in Lebanon. They stayed there three months. After the Lebanon crisis was defused, the B-57Bs were returned to Langley AFB.

The inactivation of the 345th BW was further delayed by a crisis in the Taiwan Straits. In August 1958, Mainland Chinese forces began bombarding the Nationalist-held island of Quemoy. In late August, the 345th BG sent a detachment of B-57Bs to Okinawa, once again commanded by Lt. Col. C. T. Garvin, to stay on alert just in case mainland forces tried to invade Taiwan. The crisis soon cooled and hostilities were averted, and the 345th BG returned to the US to begin inactivation. This was completed in June 1959, and the unit was inactivated on 25 June.

On 31 January 1984 the 345th Bombardment Group and the 345th Bombardment Wing were consolidated into a single unit.

== Lineage ==
345th Bombardment Group

- Constituted as the 345th Bombardment Group (Medium) on 3 September 1942

Activated on 8 September 1942
Inactivated on 29 December 1945
Redesignated 345th Bombardment Group, on 22 March 1954
Activated on 19 July 1954
Inactivated on 8 October 1957

- Consolidated with the 345th Bombardment Wing as the 345th Bombardment Wing on 31 January 1984

345th Bombardment Wing

- Constituted as the 345th Bombardment Wing, Tactical, on 23 March 1953

Activated on 8 October 1957
Inactivated on 25 June 1959

- Consolidated with the 345th Bombardment Group on 31 January 1984

=== Assignments ===
- Third Air Force, 8 September 1942
- V Bomber Command, 5 June 1943 – 10 December 1945 (attached to 309th Bombardment Wing, 8 February 1945 – 25 September 1945)
- Army Service Forces, San Francisco Port of Embarkation, 27 December 1945 – 29 December 1945
- Ninth Air Force, 22 June 1954 – 8 October 1957 (attached to the 405th Fighter-Bomber Wing)
- 836th Air Division, 8 October 1957 – 1 July 1959

=== Components ===
- 424th Bombardment Squadron: 22 June 1954 – 19 July 1954
- 498th Bombardment Squadron: 8 September 1942 – 29 December 1945; 19 July 1954 – 25 June 1959 (detached 16 July 1958 – 21 October 1958)
- 499th Bombardment Squadron: 8 September 1942 – 29 December 1945; 19 July 1954 – 8 October 1957; 8 October 1957 – 25 June 1959 (detached 6 September-9 December 1958)
- 500th Bombardment Squadron: 8 September 1942 – 29 December 1945; 19 July 1954 – 8 October 1957; 8 October 1957 – 25 June 1959 (not operational after 15 June 1959).
- 501st Bombardment Squadron: 8 September 1942 – 29 December 1945; 19 July 1954 – 8 October 1957; 8 October 1957 – 25 June 1959 (not operational after 1 June 1959)

=== Stations ===
- Columbia Army Air Base, South Carolina, 8 September 1942
- Walterboro Army Airfield, South Carolina, 6 March-16 April 1943
- Jackson Airfield (7 Mile Drome), New Guinea, 5 June 1943
- Dobodura Airfield Complex, New Guinea, 18 January 1944
- Nadzab Airfield Complex, New Guinea, c. 16 February 1944
- Mokmer Airfield, Biak Island, Netherlands East Indies, July 1944
- Leyte, Philippines 12 November 1944
- Dulag Airfield, Leyte, Philippines, December 1944
- Tacloban Airfield, Leyte, Philippines, c. 1 January 1945
- San Marcelino Airfield, Luzon, Philippines, 13 February 1945
- Clark Field, Luzon, Philippines, 12 May 1945
- Ie Shima Airfield, Okinawa, 25 July-10 December 1945
- Camp Stoneman, California, 27–29 December 1945
- Langley Air Force Base, Virginia, 22 June 1954 – 8 October 1957; 8 October 1957 – 25 June 1959

=== Aircraft ===
- North American B-25 Mitchell, 1942–1945
- Douglas B-26 Invader, 1957
- Martin RB-57A Canberra, 1954
- Martin B-57B Canberra, 1954–1957, 1957–1959

== Campaigns ==
- New Guinea
- Northern Solomons
- Bismarck Archipelago
- Southern Philippines
- Luzon
- Western Pacific
- China
- Ryukyus
- Air Offensive against Japan

== Current status ==
The 345th Bomb Group has an active reunion association holding annual reunions around the country. Additional information about the reunion association can be found at their website The 345th Bomb Group Association The group also maintains a Facebook Page, 345th Bomb Group Association.

== See also ==
- United States Army Air Forces in Australia
