= Dulag Airfield =

World War II airfield in Leyte, Philippines

Dulag Airfield
- Part of Fifth Air Force
- Dulag Airfield (Philippines)

Site information
- Type: Military airfield
- Controlled by: United States Army Air Forces

Location
- Coordinates: 10°56′53″N 125°00′37″E

Site history
- Built: 1943
- In use: 1943-1945

Dulag Airfield is a World War II airfield located near Dulag in the province of Leyte, Philippines. It was closed after the war.

== History ==
The airfield was built by the Japanese during the Occupation of the Philippines in 1943. Seized by the Americans shortly after the Leyte Landing in November 1944. Seabees from the 61st CB improved and widened the runway with a double set of revetments plus taxiways to the side. The facility was turned into a major base.

Major units assigned were:

- 3d Bombardment Group (16 November-30 December 1944)
- 22d Bombardment Group (15–26 November 1944)
- 345th Bombardment Group (12 November 1944 – 1 January 1945)
- 475th Fighter Group (28 October 1944 – 5 February 1945)
- 2d Combat Cargo Group (May-20 August 1945)
- 317th Troop Carrier Group (17 November 1944 – 17 March 1944)
- 418th Night Fighter Squadron (14–30 November 1944)

It was abandoned after the war and today it is an agricultural area. A road runs along the same position of the main runway.

A memorial is built at the former airfield, with a plaque and an airplane model on a concrete pad. The memorial plaque reads: "World War II Airfield - Brgy. Rawis Dulag, Leyte, Philippines. Constructed by the Japanese Imperial Army supported by free labor from the Dulagnons. Taken over by the Allied liberation forces in 1944, improving and widening the area with steel matting runways. Fighter and bomber planes were stationed here through the war days."

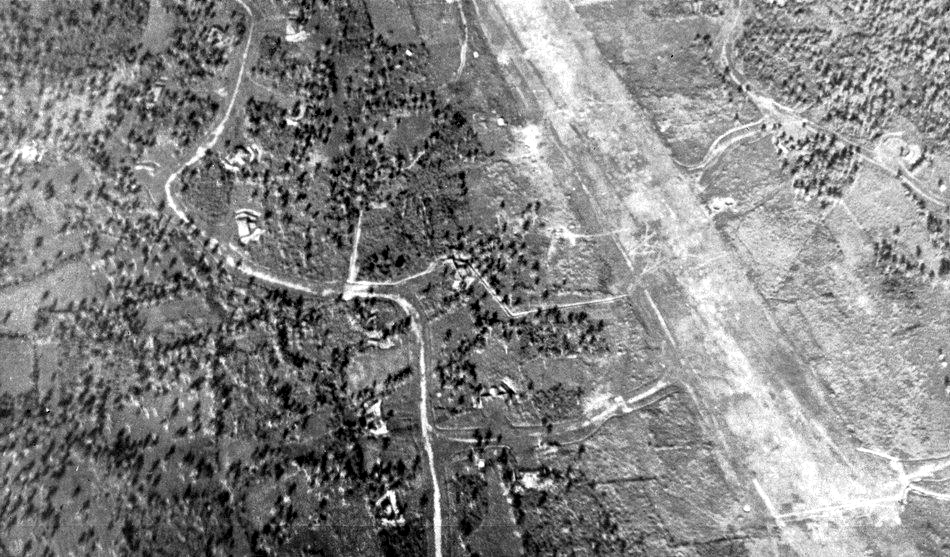
Aerial photo of Dulag airfield, 1944.

== See also ==
- USAAF in the Southwest Pacific
