= San Marcelino Airfield =

World War II airfield in Zambales, Philippines

San Marcelino Airfield
- Part of Fifth Air Force
- Province of Zambales, Philippines

Site information
- Type: Military airfield
- Controlled by: United States Army Air Forces

Location
- Coordinates: 14°57′39″N 120°12′26″E

Site history
- Built: 1940
- In use: 1940-1945

Garrison information
- Past commanders: Capt. Ramon Magsaysay
- Occupants: Elements of the US 38th Division

San Marcelino Airfield is a World War II airfield located in Zambales province of the Philippines located in the Central Luzon region. It was closed after the war.

== History ==
San Marcelino Airfield was built before the war by the Americans. On the morning of 29 January 1945 nearly 35,000 U.S. troops landed just northwest of San Marcelino. Elements of the US 38th Division immediately dashed inland to take the airstrip, but found that Filipino guerrillas under the command of Capt. Ramon Magsaysay, later president of the Republic of the Philippines, had secured the field three days earlier.

After the liberation by combined Filipino-American troops on Zambales in 1945, it was developed into a Fifth Air Force command facility as well as an operational airfield. With the end of the war, the airfield was closed and is now part of the town of San Marcelino. Units assigned were:

- 308th Bombardment Wing (11 January-16 June 1945)
- 309th Bombardment Wing (8 February-29 May 1945)
- 90th Bombardment Group (26 January-10 August 1945)
- 345th Bombardment Group (13 February-12 May 1945)
- 348th Fighter Group (4 February-15 May 1945)
- 421st Night Fighter Squadron (25 October 1944 – 8 February 1945)
- 547th Night Fighter Squadron (December 1944 16 January 1945)

== See also ==
- USAAF in the Southwest Pacific
