= Lowcountry Regional Airport =

Airport in Colleton County, South Carolina

Lowcountry Regional Airport Walterboro Army Airfield
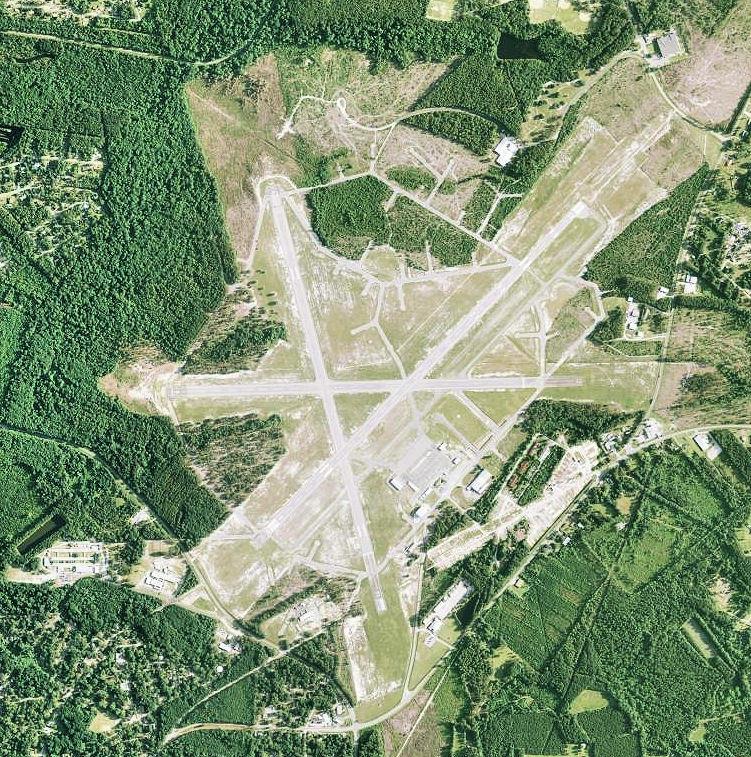
- Orthophoto from USGS
- IATA: RBW; ICAO: KRBW; FAA LID: RBW

Summary
- Airport type: Public
- Owner: City of Walterboro & Colleton County
- Serves: Walterboro, South Carolina
- Elevation AMSL: 101 ft / 31 m
- Coordinates: 32°55′16″N 80°38′26″W
- Website: LowCountryAirport.com

Map
- Location of airport in South Carolina

Runways
Direction	Length		Surface
Direction	ft	m	Surface
5/23	6,002	1,829	Asphalt/concrete
17/35	5,705	1,739	Asphalt/concrete
9/27	5,408	1,648	Asphalt/concrete

Statistics (2023)
- Aircraft operations (year ending 5/19/2023): 13,597
- Based aircraft: 21
- Source: Federal Aviation Administration

Lowcountry Regional Airport (IATA: RBW, ICAO: KRBW, FAA LID: RBW) is a public use airport located two nautical miles (4 km) northeast of the central business district of Walterboro, a city in Colleton County, South Carolina, United States. It is owned by the city and county. This airport is included in the National Plan of Integrated Airport Systems for 2011–2015, which categorized it as a general aviation facility. It does not have scheduled commercial airline service.

== History ==
The airport was dedicated June 15, 1933 as the C.C. Anderson Landing Field. In 1942 the United States Army Air Forces indicated a need for the airfield as a training airfield and control was turned over to the USAAF in February 1942. An immediate construction program began to turn the civil airport into a military airfield. Construction involved runways and airplane hangars, with three concrete runways, several taxiways and a large parking apron and a control tower. Several large hangars were also constructed. Buildings were ultimately utilitarian and quickly assembled. Most base buildings, not meant for long-term use, were constructed of temporary or semi-permanent materials. Although some hangars had steel frames and the occasional brick or tile brick building could be seen, most support buildings sat on concrete foundations but were of frame construction clad in little more than plywood and tarpaper. Walterboro Army Airfield was assigned to Third Air Force III Air Support Command, and activated on August 15, 1942. The 305th Air Base Group was the station host unit.

Initially Walterboro AAF was used primarily for training of B-25 Mitchell medium bomber pilots and aircrews, acting as a sub-base of Columbia Army Airfield for follow-on training prior to the units being deployed to overseas combat theaters. Units assigned to the airfield during World War II were:

- 310th Bombardment Group (Medium), 11 August – 18 September 1942
- 321st Bombardment Group (Medium), September 1942 – 18 December 1942
- 340th Bombardment Group (Medium), 30 November 1942 – 30 January 1943
- 345th Bombardment Group (Medium), 6 March – 16 April 1943
- 405th Fighter-Bomber Group, 14 September 1943 – 14 September 1944, (A-24 Dauntless A-25 Shrike)

Walterboro AAF also hosted the largest camouflage school in the United States, as well as a 250-person Prisoner of War Camp. In 1944 it was reassigned to First Air Force and became an advanced combat training base for individual fighters, primarily the black trainees graduating from Tuskegee Army Air Field in Tuskegee, Alabama. Over 500 of the famed Tuskegee Airmen trained at Walterboro Army Air Field between April 1944 and October 1945 including individuals training as replacement pilots for the 332nd Fighter Group and the 447th Bombardment Group. A memorial has been erected at the site commemorating their service.

The base closed on October 31, 1945, and returned to its origins as a local airfield.

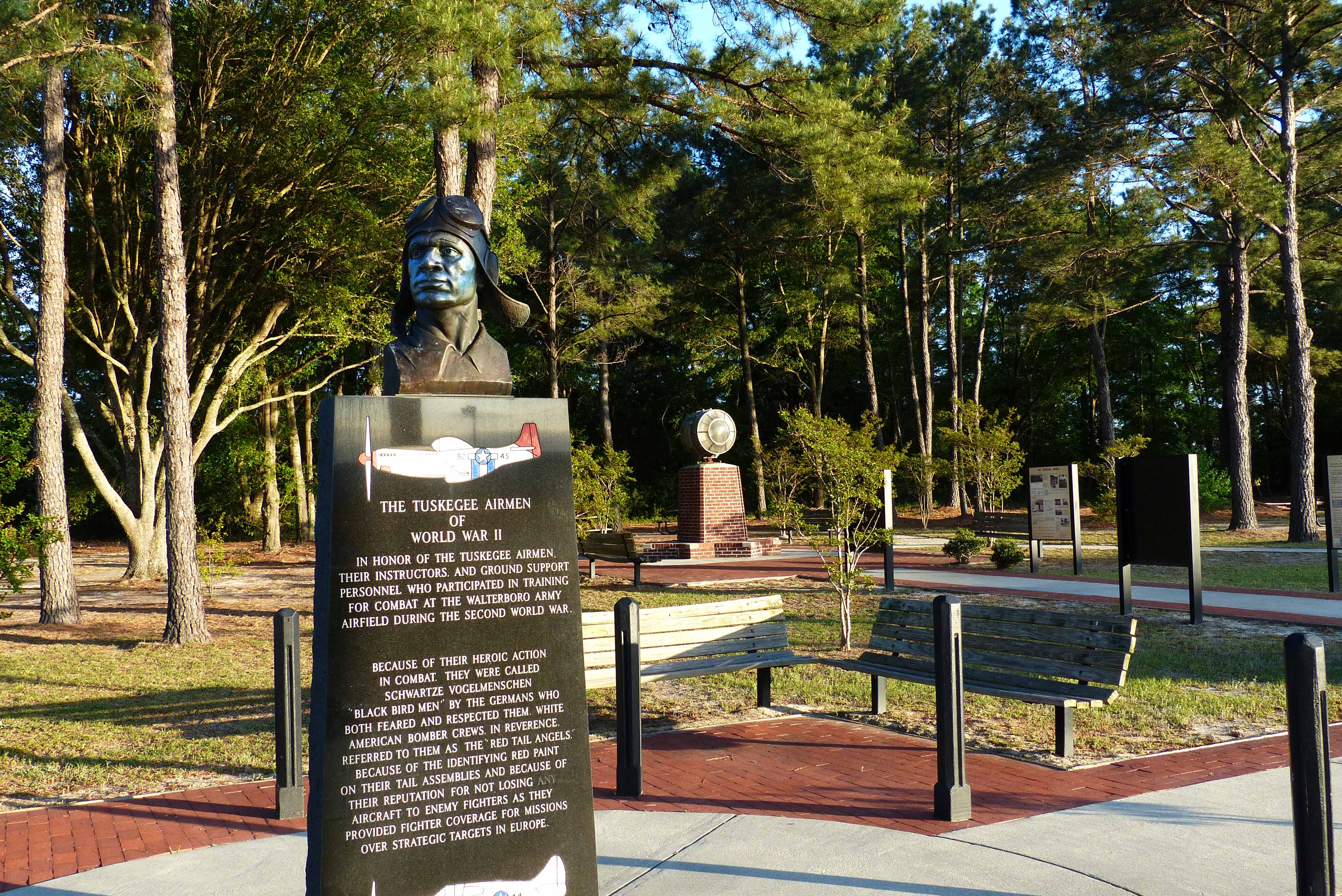
The Tuskegee Airmen Memorial

== Facilities and aircraft ==
Lowcountry Regional Airport covers an area of 1,400 acres (567 ha) at an elevation of 101 feet (31 m) above mean sea level. It has three runways with asphalt/concrete surfaces: 5/23 is 6,002 by 100 feet (1,829 by 30 m); 17/35 is 5,705 by 100 feet (1,739 by 30 m); 9/27 is 5,408 by 100 feet (1,648 by 30 m).

For the 12-month period ending May 19, 2023, the airport had 13,597 aircraft operations, an average of 38 per day: 72% general aviation, 23% air taxi, and 4% military. At that time there were 21 aircraft based at this airport: 17 single-engine and 4 multi-engine.

== See also ==
- South Carolina World War II Army Airfields
- List of airports in South Carolina
