= Daniel Z. Romualdez Airport =

Airport serving Tacloban, Leyte, Philippines

Daniel Z. Romualdez Airport Luparan han Daniel Z. Romualdez Paliparan ng Daniel Z. Romualdez
- The airport terminal in November 2023
- IATA: TAC; ICAO: RPVA; WMO: 98550

Summary
- Airport type: Public
- Owner/Operator: Civil Aviation Authority of the Philippines
- Serves: Tacloban
- Elevation AMSL: 3 m (9.8 ft)
- Coordinates: 11°13′39″N 125°01′40″E

Map
- Location within Visayas Location within Philippines

Runways
Direction	Length		Surface
Direction	m	ft	Surface
18/36	2,142	7,028	Asphalt

Statistics (2023)
- Passengers: 1,539,674 ▲186.97%
- Aircraft movements: 23,709 ▲1.03%
- Cargo (in kg): 5,587,614 ▲3.96%
- Source: CAAP

Daniel Z. Romualdez Airport (IATA: TAC, ICAO: RPVA), also known as Tacloban City Airport, is an airport serving the general area of Tacloban, a highly urbanized city in the Leyte island of the Philippines. It is the main gateway from Manila and Cebu to Eastern Visayas. It is classified as a Class 1 principal (major domestic) airport by the Civil Aviation Authority of the Philippines. In 2024, Daniel Z. Romualdez Airport served 1.69 million passengers, making it the eleventh-busiest in the country.

The airport is named after Daniel Z. Romualdez, a former speaker of the House of Representatives of the Philippines and a former representative of Leyte.

== History ==
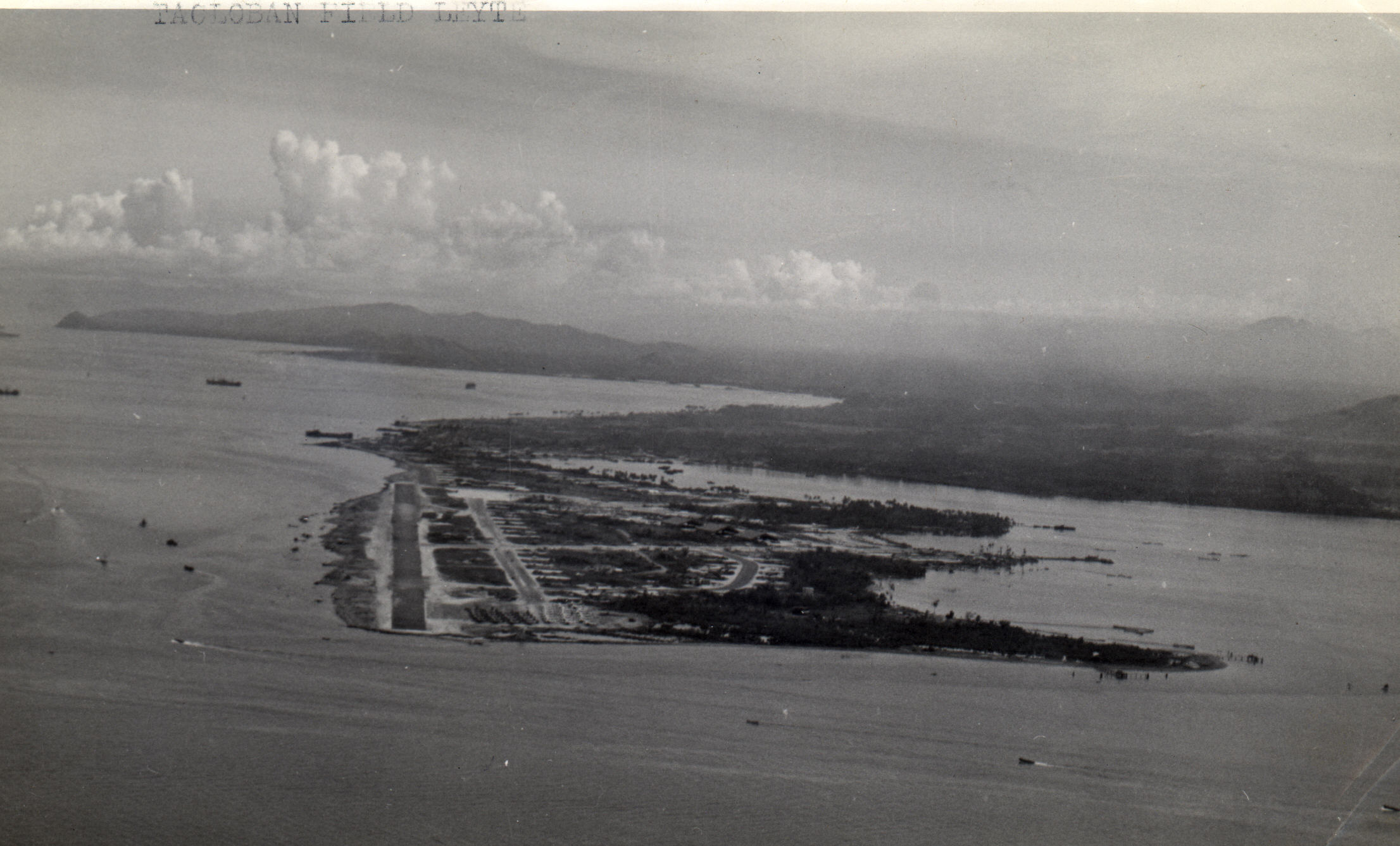
Aerial view of Tacloban Airfield

US F-5E photo reconnaissance Lightning in flames after a Japanese air raid in Tacloban

Devastation after Typhoon Haiyan

=== During World War II ===
First known as San Jose Airstrip, after the village where it is located, it was constructed as an airstrip for the US Air Force and a Seaplane base for the U.S. Navy by Seabees of the 88th Naval Construction Battalion at Leyte-Samar Naval Base Ca during World War II. USAF units based here included the 43d Bombardment Wing (15 November 1944 – 16 March 1945), 345th Bombardment Group (1 January – 13 February 1945), 417th Bombardment Group (6 December–22, 1944), 49th Fighter Group (24 October – 30 December 1944), 348th Fighter Group (16 November 1944 – 4 February 1945), 421st Night Fighter Squadron (25 October 1944 – 8 February 1945), and the 547th Night Fighter Squadron (9 November 1944 – 11 January 1945).

After World War II, when the airport was converted for use in commercial aviation, it became known popularly as Tacloban National Airport. The airport was given its current name in honor of Daniel Z. Romualdez, a representative from Leyte who became the 10th speaker of the Philippine House of Representatives. He was the uncle of Imelda Romualdez Marcos, the wife of president Ferdinand E. Marcos.

=== Devastation by Typhoon Haiyan and contemporary history ===
On November 7–8, 2013, Typhoon Haiyan roared through Tacloban and the Eastern Visayas Region. The Tacloban Airport was effectively destroyed by winds averaging to 314 km/h (195 mph) and a 4.0-meter (13 ft) storm surge. The airport terminal and the control tower were utterly demolished, and the airport was rendered unusable. The airport reopened on November 11 initially for turboprop aircraft, before reopening to A320 flights by November 14.

On January 17, 2015, Pope Francis celebrated an open-air Mass that attracted nearly half a million pilgrims from all over the country at the airport apron to remember the devastation wrought by Typhoon Haiyan.

=== Expansion and future development ===
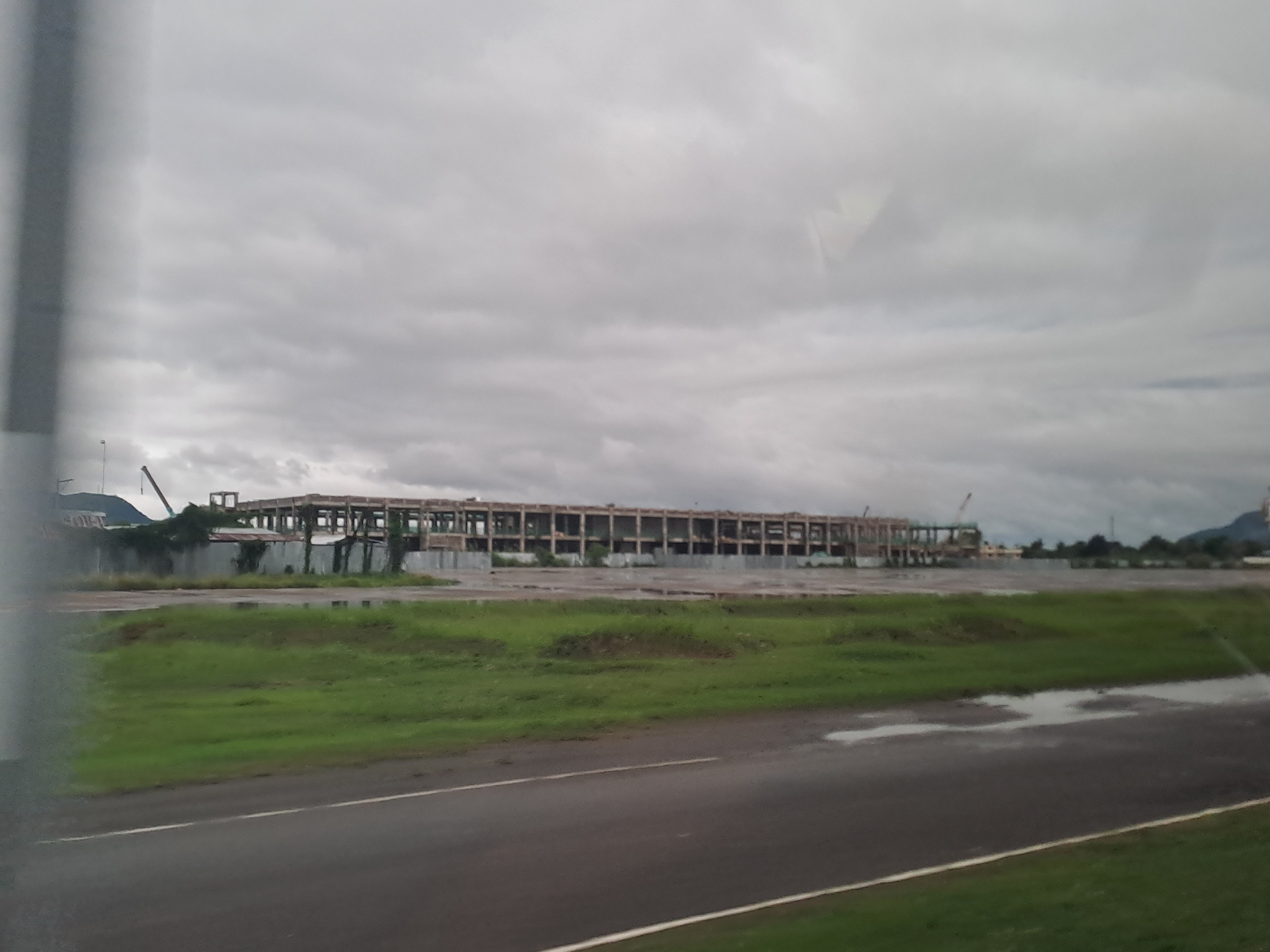
The construction of the new passenger terminal building in November 2023

In 1997, the Japan International Cooperation Agency (JICA) conducted a study which indicated the need for expansion of Daniel Z. Romualdez Airport, along with Legazpi Airport, Bacolod City Domestic Airport, and Mandurriao Airport in Iloilo City.

Expansion works for the existing passenger terminal began in 2017 to address congestion in the airport. On March 16, 2018, the expanded passenger terminal was inaugurated.

Part of the development project is the construction of the new terminal building and the extension of the runway from 2,100 to 2,500 meters (6,900 to 8,200 ft). These developments are necessary to make the airport an international airport by 2026.

== Structure ==
=== Passenger terminal ===
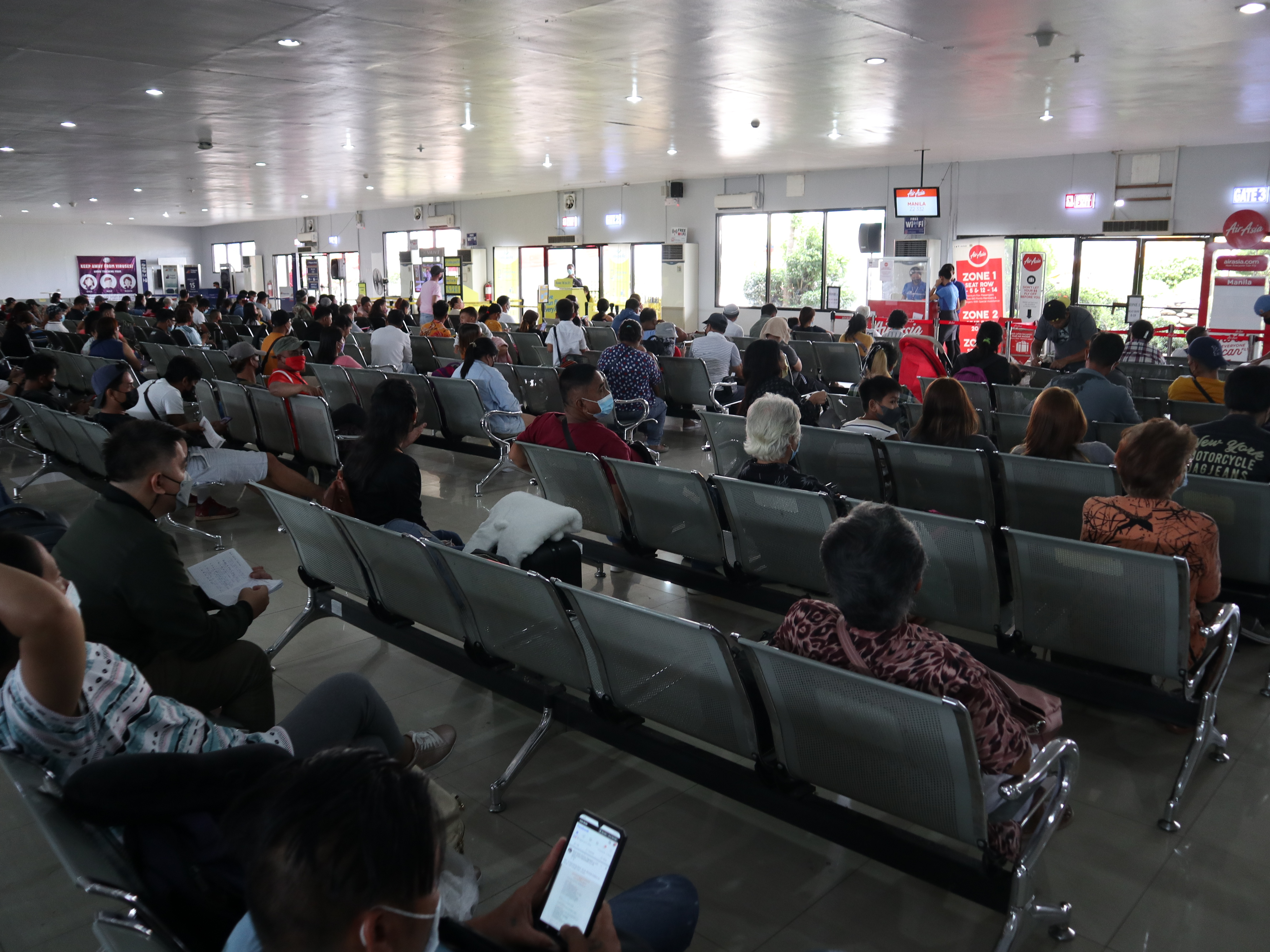
Interior of the old passenger terminal building

Daniel Z. Romualdez Airport has a single-level terminal building. The departure area has one boarding gate, scanners, and a souvenir counter. The arrival area consists of a single baggage carousel, and a porters' assistance desk.

In 2017, construction began on the expansion of the passenger terminal building which added 1,100 square meters (12,000 sq ft) of floor area and additional 275 seats in the pre-departure area. The additional seats increased the pre-departure area capacity to 635 seats, enough to accommodate passengers for at least three simultaneous flights, compared to 360 prior to the construction. The check-in area was also expanded.

On September 15, 2020, then-House Majority Leader and Leyte's 1st district representative Martin Romualdez unveiled the approved design of the terminal. Construction on the ₱1.96 billion terminal with a capacity of 1,670 passengers started in the same year and is halfway complete as of March 2023.

=== Runway ===
The airport has a single 2,100-meter (6,900 ft) runway running in a direction of 18°/36°. There are plans to extend the runway to 2,500 meters (8,200 ft). It would be implemented by 2025 to make the airport capable of handling international flights.

=== Other structures ===
Other structures include a communications tower and an administrative building. The communications tower is located on the east end of the terminal building. It serves as the main communications facility of the airport. The administrative building houses the offices of airport staff and the Civil Aviation Authority of the Philippines.

== Ground transportation ==
Access to the airport from central Tacloban is served by the jeepney services on the Downtown-San Jose-Airport route, from Marasbaras route, and the service from nearby Palo. In 2010, an airport taxi service was opened to shuttle passengers from the airport to the city's Central Bus Terminal, the city's commercial area and other destinations such as the San Juanico Bridge and the MacArthur Landing Memorial in Palo and to Tacloban's suburbs.

== Airlines and destinations ==
Airlines	Destinations
Cebgo	Cebu, Iloilo
Cebu Pacific	Davao, Manila
PAL Express	Cebu, Manila
Philippines AirAsia	Manila

== Statistics ==
Data from Civil Aviation Authority of the Philippines (CAAP).

Year	Passenger movements		Aircraft movements		Cargo movements (in kg)	
Year	Domestic	% change	Domestic	% change	Domestic	% change
2001	299,295	Steady	7,328	Steady	3,383,703	Steady
2002	303,490	▲1.40	7,472	▲1.97	3,221,230	▼4.80
2003	283,573	▼6.56	6,428	▼13.97	2,983,144	▼7.39
2004	289,669	▲2.15	6,192	▼3.67	3,060,683	▲2.60
2005	328,358	▲13.36	4,440	▼28.29	3,506,773	▲14.57
2006	399,885	▲21.78	5,176	▲16.58	3,579,380	▲2.07
2007	511,322	▲27.87	4,470	▼13.64	4,145,166	▲15.81
2008	627,108	▲22.64	5,238	▲17.18	4,546,650	▲9.69
2009	892,425	▲42.31	9,024	▲72.28	5,015,171	▲10.30
2010	907,347	▲1.67	6,654	▼26.26	6,268,769	▲25.00
2011	1,009,575	▲11.27	15,180	▲128.13	6,681,674	▲6.59
2012	1,149,592	▲13.87	19,764	▲30.20	6,543,618	▼2.07
2013	538,727	▼53.14	8,620	▼56.39	3,327,658	▼49.15
2014	863,634	▲60.31	8,466	▼1.79	5,799,107	▲74.27
2015	1,110,789	▲28.62	9,916	▲17.13	6,604,742	▲13.89
2016	1,182,951	▲6.50	20,530	▲107.04	7,134,195	▲8.02
2017	1,165,194	▼1.50	20,128	▼1.96	6,990,474	▼2.01
2018	1,443,318	▲23.87	25,642	▲27.39	10,504,326	▲50.27
2019	1,405,701	▼2.61	22,584	▼11.93	9,933,320	▼5.44
2020	363,782	▼74.12	10,078	▼55.38	3,971,878	▼60.01
2021	519,158	▲42.71	13,088	▲29.87	6,515,357	▲64.04
2022	1,489,803	▲186.97	23,468	▲79.31	5,374,654	▼17.51
2023	1,539,674	▲186.97	23,709	▲1.03	5,587,614	▲3.96

== Accidents and incidents ==
- On August 4, 1984, a Philippine Airlines BAC One-Eleven 500 overshot runway 36 by 30 meters (100 ft) and landed at sea. All 70 passengers and five crew survived.
- On February 15, 2007, Philippine Airlines Flight 191 from Manila, performed by an Airbus A320, overshot the runway. There were no casualties among 113 passengers and six crew members. DZMM Correspondent Hector Go said the aircraft's front wheel ended up past the airstrip after the plane attempted to touch down in the middle of the runway around 7 a.m.
- On February 13, 2009, Cebu Pacific Flight 651 arriving from Manila, performed by an Airbus A319, suffered a bird strike upon landing at the airport, damaging the engine blades. Though the aircraft landed safely, its return flight was cancelled.
- On January 17, 2015, a Bombardier Global 5000 carrying Cabinet members Jojo Ochoa and Sonny Coloma, overshot the runway after it failed to take-off shortly after the Pope's plane took off. There were no casualties.
- On October 5, 2019, a Royal Australian Air Force Boeing C-17 Globemaster III was on its way to Edinburgh, Australia from Okinawa, Japan when it had an emergency landing at the airport at 12:48 p.m. after smoke was detected in the cockpit. The plane had eight crew members and 36 passengers. The aircraft departed for Australia two days later without further incident.

== See also ==
- List of airports in the Philippines
- United States Army Air Forces in the South West Pacific Theatre
