= Louis Edward Curdes =

American Flying Triple-Axis Ace

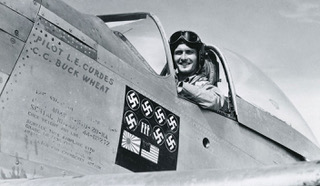
- Louis E. Curdes sitting in his P-51D "Bad Angel" in the Philippines, 1945.
- Born: November 2, 1919; Fort Wayne, Indiana, U.S.
- Died: February 5, 1995 (aged 75)
- Burial place: Lindenwood Cemetery, Fort Wayne, Indiana
- Spouse: Svetlana Valeria Shostakovich Brownell (m. 1946)
- Military career
- Allegiance: United States
- Branch: United States Army Air Forces; United States Air Force
- Service years: 1941–1947 (USAAF); 1947–1963 (USAF)
- Rank: Lieutenant Colonel
- Nickname: Lou
- Service number: O-733836
- Units: 329th Fighter Group, Fourth Air Force (1943); 82nd Fighter Group, 95th Fighter Squadron (1943); 4th Fighter Squadron, 3rd Air Commando Group (1944-1945); Twelfth Air Force; Fifteenth Air Force
- Conflicts: World War II; North African Campaign; Italian Campaign; Philippines Campaign; Battle of Luzon
- Awards: Distinguished Flying Cross (2); Purple Heart

Louis Edward "Lou" Curdes (November 2, 1919 – February 5, 1995) was an American flying ace of the United States Army Air Forces during World War II who held the unusual distinctions of scoring an official and intentional air-to-air kill against another American aircraft as well as shooting down at least one aircraft from each of the major Axis powers.

Curdes grew up having an interest in aviation and would later drop out of college to join the military to become a pilot on December 6, 1941, the day before the Attack on Pearl Harbor. He served in multiple campaigns of the Mediterranean theater and acquired several victories over enemy aircraft, becoming a Flying ace (meaning that he was confirmed to have shot down five or more enemy aircraft during aerial combat) in less than a month of combat. He was later shot down and became a Prisoner of war. He then escaped captivity twice and was recaptured twice and after his prison guards abandoned their posts, he spent about nine months in the enemy-held central Apennine Mountains. Curdes eventually returned home and then went back to combat. This time it would be late in the war in the Pacific theater where he would shoot down only two aircraft before the end of the war.

He was awarded the Distinguished Flying Cross twice (one for action in the Mediterranean theater and one for action in the Pacific theater), a Purple Heart, 14 Air Medals and the Prisoner of War Medal. He flew a Lockheed P-38 Lightning in both theaters and a North American P-51 Mustang only in the Pacific. Curdes named his first P-38 "Good Devil" and his P-51 "Bad Angel."

Curdes was one of only three American pilots to shoot down aircraft belonging to the German, Italian and Japanese air forces. The other two pilots were Lt. Col. Carl Payne and Maj. Gen. Levi R. Chase. In total, Curdes shot down seven German Messerschmitt Bf 109s, an Italian Macchi C.202 fighter, a Japanese Mitsubishi Ki-46 reconnaissance aircraft and an American Douglas C-47 Skytrain. After the war, Curdes flew Douglas C-54 Skymasters in a transport unit during the Berlin Airlift. Not long after he was essential in creating an Indiana Air National Guard unit, which in 1946 was federally recognized and is still active today. Curdes then joined the new United States Air Force and served on bases around the country and world until he retired after 22 years of service. After retiring he founded a construction company. Curdes died on February 5, 1995, at the age of 75, almost exactly 50 years after shooting down a C-47.

== Early life ==
Louis Edward Curdes was born on November 2, 1919, to Esther H. (née Kover) a former schoolteacher and Walter L. Curdes who worked in development and homebuilding real estate. He grew up in Fort Wayne, Indiana, during the great depression, with one sister. He graduated from North Side High School in 1938. Curdes played basketball and ran track in high school, but his coach caught him smoking so he was cut from the teams. He would also help maintain many of his father's rental properties.

Walter Curdes had an interest in aviation and had assisted Art Smith with repairing his aircraft. He would also take young Louis to air races at Smith Field, Cleveland and Georgia. When Curdes was eight or nine, he got a ride in a World War I Curtiss JN Jenny. Curdes' father also took him to see the building of the USS Akron and the USS Macon airships. Due to these experiences, young Louis developed a deep interest in aviation.

Louis later enrolled at Purdue University to study engineering and found construction work in the summers. Curdes only occasionally followed the ongoing wars in Europe and Asia, but still had a strong dislike of Adolf Hitler and Benito Mussolini. After three years of study, he dropped out and joined the military to become a pilot on December 6, 1941, the day before the Attack on Pearl Harbor.

About a month later, Curdes became a Flying Cadet and spent the next month in Santa Ana, California, two months in Ontario, California, two months in Lancaster, California for Basic Combat Training and then two months in Luke Field, Arizona. He trained on a few different aircraft including the Stearman PT-13, North American T-6 Texan, Vultee BT-13 Valiant (which the cadets at the time called the "Vultee Vomit") and the Curtiss P-36 Hawk. At the time, few cadets got to experience the high-performance P-36 Hawk. He then joined the Army Reserve on March 12, 1942, and later became a 2nd Lieutenant, graduating from Flying School on December 3, 1942, at Luke Field, Arizona at the age of 23 and was posted to the Mediterranean theater.

== World War II ==
=== North Africa and Italy ===
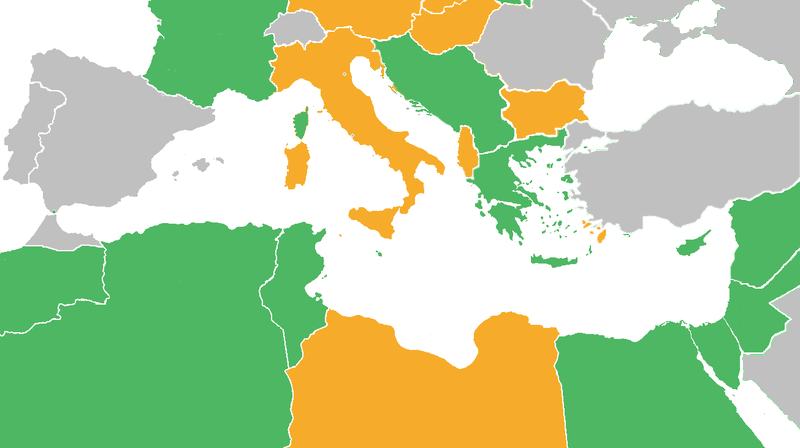
A map showing the territories held by powers at the outbreak of hostilities in the Mediterranean. Allies Axis neutral

Curdes joined the 329th Fighter Group in Glendale, California and then spent a month at Naval Air Station North Island in San Diego. After that, he was sent to Edwards Air Force Base and then back to Santa Ana. In March, he was sent overseas, but on April 17, was transferred to the 82nd Fighter Group, 95th Fighter Squadron, where he saw action in North Africa, Sardinia and Italy, flying a Lockheed P-38 Lightning. Curdes first mission was on March 23, 1943, near Cape Bon, Tunisia. He engaged multiple Messerschmitt Bf 109s of the Jagdgeschwader 27 and was able to shoot down three and damaged a fourth. He had such a shortage of fuel after this engagement that he had to force a landing in a dry riverbed and wait for the Army to bring him fuel and Marston Mat to create a temporary runway.

On May, 19, the 82nd escorted B-25 Mitchell bombers near Villacidro, Sardinia and on the way back, Curdes' unit was engaged by eight Bf 109s. Curdes managed to shoot down two of them. In less than a month of combat, Curdes became a flying ace. During another escort mission on June 24, he shot down an Italian Macchi C.202 over Golfo Aranci in northern Sardinia and then damaged a German Bf 109 on July 30 over Pratica di Mare, Italy. In August, he was awarded his first Distinguished Flying Cross.

=== Distinguished Flying Cross citation ===
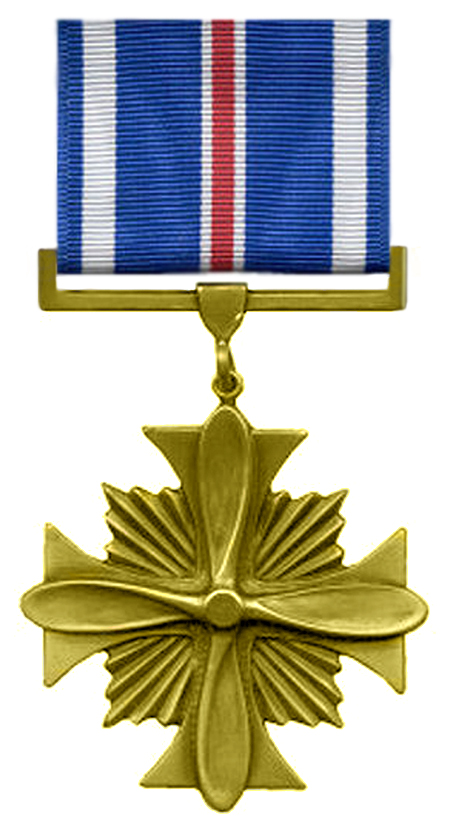
The Distinguished Flying Cross medal

Place and date: North African Theater of operations, April 29, 1943.

General Orders: Headquarters, Northwest African Air Forces, General Orders No. 128 (June 30, 1943).

Citation: The President of the United States of America, authorized by Act of Congress, July 2, 1926, takes pleasure in presenting the Distinguished Flying Cross to First Lieutenant (Air Corps) Louis Edward Curdes (ASN: 0-733836), United States Army Air Forces, for extraordinary achievement while participating in aerial flight as pilot of a P-38 type aircraft of the 95th Fighter Squadron, 82d Fighter Group, FIFTEENTH Air Force in the North African Theater of Operations. On April 29, 1943, on a skip-bombing mission in the Sicilian Straits, Lieutenant Curdes' formation was attacked by twelve enemy fighters. Despite the fact that he had been unable to release his bomb, Lieutenant Curdes turned to attack, destroying one ME-109 and damaging another. Sighting two ME-109s attacking a crippled P-38, he unhesitatingly attacked and destroyed both of them and escorted the damaged aircraft to friendly territory. His consistent gallantry and devotion to duty have reflected great credit upon himself and the Armed Forces of the United States.

=== Capture and escape ===
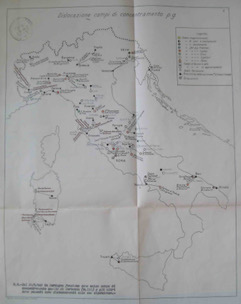
Map of prisoner of war camps in Italy. Curdes was probably held at Cinecittà, just north of Rome.

While escorting bombers to Benevento, Italy on August 27, 1943, Curdes' unit came under attack by about 50 enemy aircraft. During the engagement, Curdes turned around to help a teammate (which was against regulations) who was under attack by multiple Bf-109s when he was shot down over Salerno, Italy. Before he was shot down, he managed to take out two Bf 109s which would be his last two victories in Europe. He also received injuries to his back and shoulder from rounds that came through his canopy. He was forced to land wheels up on a beach about 10 miles south of Salerno due to combat damage to his aircraft and a shortage of fuel. He set his plane on fire and was soon captured by Italian soldiers who treated him well and even refused a German attempt to transfer him over to them. Curdes briefly escaped for several hours when he and 4 other Americans stole a Red cross boat in Salerno, but they were captured again by the Italians and Curdes was then sent to a prison camp near Rome.

When Curdes was shot down, he may have been the 63rd victory of Luftwaffe Experte Oberleutnant Franz Schieß of 8./JG 53. Curdes' final score at the wars end would be 9 kills and 2 damaged, which made him the second-highest scoring ace of the 82nd fighter group. During that summer of 1943, Curdes flew 44 combat missions, totaling 200 hours. Curdes had not received any SERE training, but did have an escape packet with local currencies, gold coins and rubber maps. Curdes considered the maps to be worthless. He also carried an M1911A1 pistol on every combat mission he flew, although some pilots at the time were not encouraged to carry sidearms because they were of little usefulness.

Curdes was first kept in a monastery in San Valentino, Sorano, but he and a few others escaped, but were later recaptured and taken to a much higher security prison. Four days later, the Italians signed an Armistice with the Allies. In response to this, Germany invaded its former ally. Many prison guards left their positions and rifles before the Germans could take control of the POW camp. Some friendly guards even gave prisoners rifles and blankets before letting them go. The group of about twenty officers took food, rifles (likely Carcano M1891s) and ammunition and over the next eight months, travelled south through the central Apennine Mountains, making their way toward the Allied advance. One British wing commander from Curdes' group was killed sometime after leaving the POW camp. Local civilians and the communist Italian resistance aided the group by giving them handguns and supplies. The group slept during the day wherever the resistance told them to and travelled by night.

By early 1944, Curdes' family gave up believing that he could still be alive, especially after receiving letters of sympathy from Curdes' teammates and commanding officers. However, Curdes' best friend, 1st Lt. Burt Lutz, sent his parents a letter stating that he talked to another officer who had escaped with Curdes from an Italian POW camp near Rome. Lutz wrote to them that Curdes' group was sending back men two at a time and that Curdes would be one of the last to come back. This was unofficial and officially Curdes was still Missing in action.

On August 30, 1944, Major John "Gil" Bright was shot down over nearby Montalto di Castro and held prisoner until the Armistice. Bright already had confirmed Japanese, Italian and a "shared" German kill. Who got the credit for the German kill was decided by a coin toss which he lost and he was not in the Army Air Forces at the time of his Japanese kills, so it is somewhat a matter of debate if he is a triple-axis ace or not. However, after the Armistice, Bright travelled about 100 miles through enemy territory to reach Allied lines. Whether his path crossed with future triple-axis ace Louis Curdes is unknown.

On May 27, 1944, exactly nine months after being shot down, Curdes was near the Battle of Monte Cassino and was able to make it through Allied lines. He was wearing civilian clothes and carrying a fake Italian ID when he stumbled across some British troops from the Eighth Army. Curdes called out: "Have you got a cigarette?" A lieutenant responded: "Sure. Come over here, Yank." They questioned Curdes and eventually were able to verify his identity. Curdes then taught survival and escape methods to Allied aircrews for a couple of weeks before being sent back to the U.S. for repatriation. Curdes' family was told in June that he was still alive and he was welcomed in Fort Wayne as a hero and given an improvised parade. He spent his time at home with his family and fishing with his father. Curdes had no intention of flying again until he met Bud Mahurin, who he had already met when they were at Purdue University together. Curdes requested a return to active duty, but because of the Geneva Conventions and Curdes being a former escaped POW, he was unable to fly in the European theatre again so he joined the 4th Fighter Squadron and the 3rd Air Commando Group in the Pacific in August 1944, flying the P-51 Mustang. Curdes' 1946 marriage license states that he was married before and the divorce was finalized on October 3, 1944.

=== Pacific Campaign and shooting down an American aircraft ===
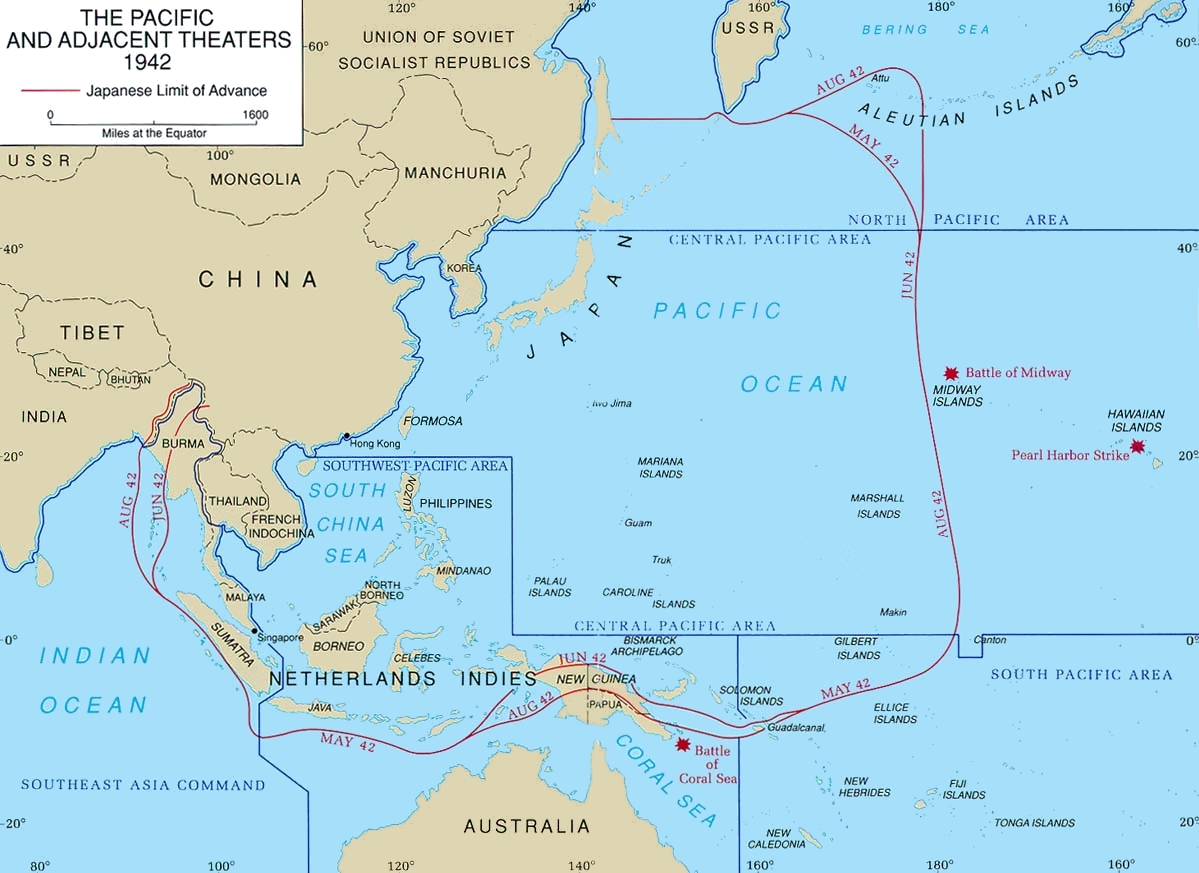
A map of the Asiatic-Pacific Theater showing its component areas. (The China-Burma-India Theater fell under the British-led South East Asia Command)

By November 1944, parts of the Philippines were again under U.S. control. His unit, the 3rd Air Commando Group, had the task of bombing Japanese bases and providing support to ground troops. They also raided Japanese facilities along the coast of China and the island of Taiwan, providing escort duties to Allied ships, dropping supplies from the air, delivering mail, and evacuating the wounded.

On February 7, 1945, Curdes flew a P-51 about 30 miles (48 km) southwest of Taiwan, where he shot down a Japanese Mitsubishi Ki-46-II reconnaissance aircraft. The Ki-46 was alone and flew through Curdes' formation. Curdes called out that the aircraft was at 3 o'clock when he actually knew it was at 9 o'clock. His teammates looked towards 3 o'clock, while Curdes and his wingman flew towards 9 o'clock so Curdes could get the kill. In recalling the event in a 1991 interview, Curdes stated: "There was no fight. Just two dead Japs and one bad airplane." By shooting down the Ki-46, Curdes now had victories on enemy aircraft from all of the three major Axis powers.

On February 10, Curdes, now a lieutenant, formed a squadron of four aircraft that departed from Mangaldan Airfield in the Philippines. Their objective was to investigate if the Japanese were using a temporary airstrip on the southern tip of Taiwan. No airfield could be found and Curdes returned to the Philippines. Flying over the island of Batan, the squadron split; Curdes and Lieutenant Schmidtke headed north, while Lieutenants Scalley and La Croix headed south. Scalley and La Croix located a small Japanese airfield and attacked it and also called for reinforcement, Curdes and Schmidtke headed south to join them.

During the attack on the airfield, La Croix was shot down and made an emergency landing in the sea. As the squadron circled, Curdes could see that his companion had survived, and remained in the area to guide a rescue plane and protect the downed pilot. While covering La Croix, Curdes noticed a larger twin-engined plane preparing to land at the Batan airfield from the east. When he saw American markings on it, he at first thought it could be a Showa/Nakajima L2D (which were Japanese license-built versions of the Douglas DC-3) with American markings. He flew to investigate and found the aircraft to be a Douglas C-47 Skytrain transport with markings of the "Jungle Skippers", the 39th Airlift Squadron of the 317th Troop Carrier Group. Curdes did not believe the aircraft to be enemy controlled and tried to make contact by radio but was not successful. He maneuvered his P-51 in front of the plane several times trying to get the C-47 to alter course, but the C-47 maintained its course.

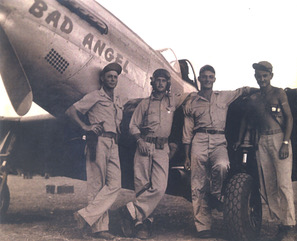
Curdes in the Pacific with his flight crew. Curdes is on the far right carrying an M1911A1 with ivory grips in an M7 shoulder holster.

Unknown to Curdes, the C-47 had got lost in bad weather, had been flying for almost 5 hours and their radio was malfunctioning. According to an after-action report: "We received no bearings or response of any kind. The airplane continued until 1150 hours and was still over water. The pilot then informed his passengers that he was in trouble and would set the airplane down on the first land he saw." Unknown to the pilot, the airstrip he intended to land on was Japanese-occupied.

The C-47 was circling and now was attempting to land on the Batan airfield. The plane had its landing gear down and was at an altitude of about 150 feet. Curdes fired in front of the C-47, but it still maintained its course. At this point, they were close enough to shore that Japanese flak guns started firing at Curdes' P-51, but not at the C-47 possibly because they thought it to be one of their own, especially considering Curdes' behavior towards it. Curdes reasoned that it was better to shoot down the aircraft than allow the crew to be taken prisoner by the Japanese. Curdes came about 20 yards from the C-47 and fired into one of its two engines, causing it to fail. The C-47 maintained its course for Batan, so Curdes disabled the other engine, forcing the pilot to ditch in the sea. The plane successfully ditched about 300 yards from shore without breaking up and the crew was able to evacuate into lifeboats. The C-47 crew drifted to about a mile from shore and was then engaged by enemy small arms fire from the shore for about half an hour. Curdes dropped a message around this time saying: "Keep away from shore. Japs there." La Croix approached and was brought on board the C-47's life raft, where he was informed about the situation.

At this point, poor light and lack of fuel forced Curdes and his wingman to return to base. Before dawn the next morning, Curdes and his wingman led the PBY-5A Catalina that picked up the downed C-47 pilot and 11 crew members, including two nurses, all of whom had survived the incident. To Curdes's surprise, he discovered that one of the nurses was a woman with whom he had to cancel a date without notice the night before shooting down the C-47. A reporter for Air Force magazine later interviewed Curdes about the incident who said: "Seven 109's and one Macchi in North Africa, one Jap, and one Yank in the Pacific-and to top it, I have to go out and shoot down the girlfriend." Curdes story was in the August 1945 issue of Air Force magazine titled, "Yank for Good Measure." It became a rumor that Curdes married the nurse that he shot down after the war, however this is untrue. He actually met his second wife after the war in Los Angeles, California. General George Kenney awarded Curdes his second Distinguished Flying Cross and an Air Medal for the event. Curdes also received credit for the "kill" and displayed it on his aircraft.

Curdes later flew the P-38 Lightning again with the 49th Fighter Group at Gabu Airfield in Laoag, Philippines, from where he attacked Japanese positions in northern Luzon and Okinawa until the end of the war. A few days before the end of the war, General Kenney and General MacArthur had Curdes brought to Manila and gave him an assignment of escorting some top-secret papers to Washington, D.C. They shackled the briefcase to his wrist, gave him a gun and put him on a special flight through Manila, Guam, Hawaii, San Francisco to Washington D.C. where he was escorted into Henry H. Arnold's office. Overall, Curdes flew 38 missions in North Africa and 10 in the Pacific.

== After the war ==
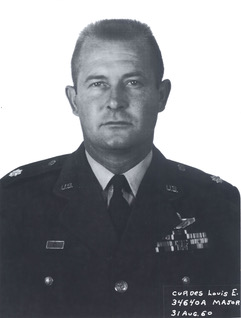
Then Major Curdes in August 31st, 1960.

After World War II, Curdes met Svetlana Valeria Shostakovich Brownell in Los Angeles, California on a blind date and they later married in Allen County, Indiana, on April 13, 1946. After they honeymooned in Cuba and Florida, they settled down in Fort Wayne, Indiana. They later had 2 children together, Christopher Allen and Valeria Louise. Svetlana was born in Harbin, Manchuria on May 23, 1925, to Russian parents and is the niece of Dmitri Shostakovich, a Soviet composer and pianist. Her step-father, a U.S. Marine named Jerome C. Brownell, who her mother married in 1929, got Svetlana's family out of Manchuria because of the Japanese invasion. Jerome Brownell died not long later in June 1932 of a septic sore throat and his remains were later sent home on the USS Wilson. Curdes was then sent to Camp Atterbury-Muscatatuck and initially wanted to retire, but very quickly he was assigned to create a new unit. He was essential in creating an Indiana Air National Guard unit at Baer Field in Fort Wayne, Indiana and served there until 1948. Later he flew about 30 flights in Douglas C-54 Skymasters in the Berlin airlift during the beginning of the Cold War which would be the only time he flew in a transport unit. Later Curdes was told he could get a regular commission so he returned to active duty, this time with the new United States Air Force.

Around this time, Curdes joined the Air Rescue Service. After the Berlin Airlift, Curdes served on Air bases around the country and world until his retirement. He served on bases in Orlando, Florida. Tripoli, North Africa. Michigan and Washington D.C. In 1951, Curdes, with his wife, returned to central Italy to visit many of the people who had helped him survive during the war. On September 1, 1951, Curdes was promoted to the rank of Major and 12 years later, in October 1963, he retired from the Air Force as a Lieutenant Colonel. After his retirement, he founded a construction company called Curdes Builders Company.

== Death and legacy ==
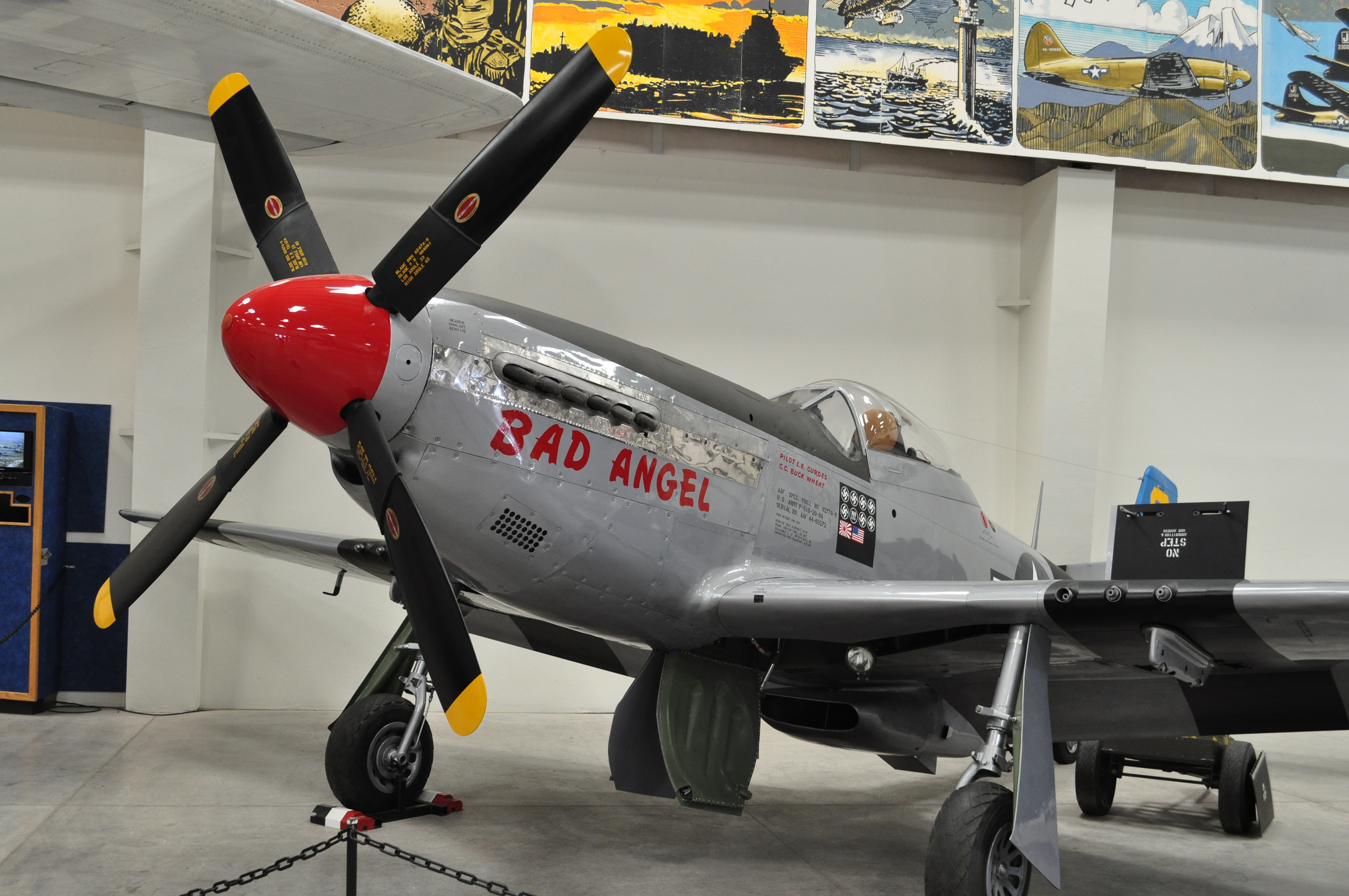
A replica of Curdes' P-51 which is currently on display at the Pima Air & Space Museum in Tucson, Arizona

Louis Curdes died on February 5, 1995, at the age of 75, almost exactly 50 years after shooting down a C-47. He was laid to rest at Lindenwood Cemetery in his hometown of Fort Wayne, Indiana. He was survived by his wife of 48 years, Svetlana Curdes, who later died at the age of 87 on October 10, 2013.

Adventure novelist and underwater explorer, Clive Cussler used the incident of Curdes shooting down a friendly plane as inspiration for some of the character history of Dirk Pitt. Cussler had served in the United States Air Force at the same time Curdes was serving from 1950 to 1953 in the Military Air Transport Service, a unit which played mostly a supporting role during the Berlin Airlift.

After Curdes' death in 1995, Senator Richard Lugar (R-Ind) told the 104th United States Congress: "It is with great respect that I call to my colleagues’ attention the contributions Louis Curdes made to his country. He is truly an example and inspiration for all who follow him."

== Awards and decorations ==
Lieutenant Colonel Curdes received the following awards:

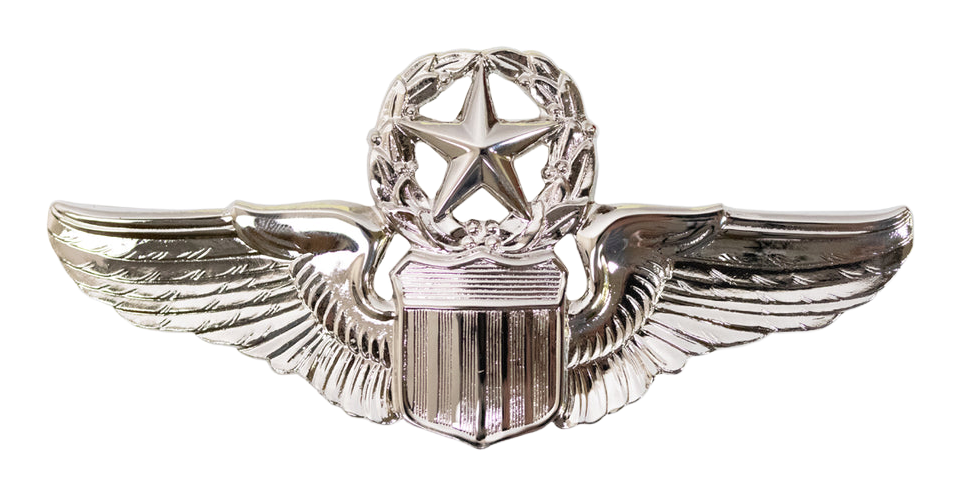

Badge	Command Pilot Badge		
1st Row	Distinguished Flying Cross with 1 bronze oak leaf cluster		Purple Heart
2nd Row	Air Medal with 2 silver and 2 bronze oak leaf clusters	Air Medal	Prisoner of War Medal
3rd Row	American Defense Service Medal	American Campaign Medal	Asiatic-Pacific Campaign Medal with 1 silver service star
4th Row	European–African–Middle Eastern Campaign Medal with 4 bronze service stars	World War II Victory Medal	Army of Occupation Medal
5th Row	Medal for Humane Action with Berlin Airlift Device	National Defense Service Medal with 1 bronze service star	Air Force Longevity Service Award with 4 bronze oak leaf clusters
6th Row	Armed Forces Reserve Medal	Philippine Independence Medal	Philippine Liberation Medal with 2 bronze service stars

Lieutenant Colonel Curdes was also awarded a U.S. Army Distinguished Unit Citation ribbon with one oak leaf cluster and he was given a Certificate of Valor by General Nathan F. Twining.

== See also ==
- List of World War II flying aces
- List of World War II flying aces by country
- List of World War II aces from the United States
