= 3rd Fighter Squadron (Commando) =

- Active: 1944-1948
- Country: United States
- Branch: United States Army Air Forces
- Type: Fighter
- Role: Tactical Fighter/Close Air Support
- Part of: 3rd Air Commando Group
- Engagements: World War II (Asia-Pacific Theater): Air Offensive, Japan; China Defensive; Western Pacific; Leyte; Luzon; China Offensive

- Decorations: Philippine Republic Presidential Unit Citation

Commanders
- Notable commanders: Colonel Bud Mahurin

The 3rd Fighter Squadron (Commando) was a United States Air Force unit. Its last assignment was with the 3rd Air Commando Group, based at Chitose, Japan. It was disbanded on 8 October 1948.

The squadron was a World War II Air Commando unit, primarily seeing combat during the Philippines Campaign (1944–45) with the 3rd Air Commando Group. There is no lineage between this unit and the 3rd Pursuit Squadron (Interceptor) which saw combat in the 1941-1942 Battle of the Philippines.

== History ==
=== Origins ===
The squadron was initially organized as the 3rd Fighter-Reconnaissance Squadron at Lakeland Army Airfield, Florida in May 1944. Many of the squadron's pilots came from the 2d Air Commando Group's 1st Fighter Squadron (Commando), which had been disbanded previously. It took several weeks, however, for the squadron to receive any aircraft, and when it did, it was a mixture of used Curtiss P-40C Warhawks and North American P-51B Mustangs which had been transferred to Lakeland from other training bases who had been re-equipped with newer aircraft. However, aircraft were aircraft and the pilots were happy to get them to fly and gain proficiency.

In early August the squadron moved to Alachua Army Airfield near Gainesville to begin training with units of the Army Air Forces School of Applied Tactics (AAFSAT), a part of Air University which specialized in the development of new combat tactics. AAFSAT developed training maneuvers with the 318th Troop Carrier Squadron Douglas C-47 Skytrains, and Stinson L-5 Sentinels of the liaison squadrons of the group. The 3rd ACS liaison aircraft flew reconnaissance over an "enemy" airfield, and the fighter squadrons conducted simulated bombing and strafing attacks, while the Troop Carrier Squadron carried out a night glider assault. Then the assault troops had to hold out for a few days against "enemy" forces before being pulled out. With the successful completion of the exercise, the group was judged ready for deployment into combat.

In October the men of the squadron transferred to Drew Field, Tampa, Florida, for final preparations. After several weeks, the squadrons began leaving by train on 24 October, heading for Camp Stoneman, Oakland California where the men were issued tropical uniforms, attending more classes and lectures, getting shots and filling out an endless number of forms. On 6 November, the men boarded ferries to board the USS General M. L. Hersey, their transport to the war zone in the Southwest Pacific. A brief stop was made at Guadalcanal, which had become a major logistics base, then they proceeded to Finschafen and Hollandia on New Guinea.

At Hollandia, the pilots were flown by transports to Nadzab Airfield, New Guinea, where they were assigned new P-51D Mustangs, as well as some additional pilots. Many of these replacements had been in the Southwest Pacific for several months and been ferrying P-40s between bases. Although none had any P-51 Mustang experience, they flew checkout flights and were informed they were to fly it. From Nadzab, sixteen Mustangs were flown to a new airfield via Biak on 7 January 1945 in the vicinity of Tanauan on Leyte. The pilots of the squadron broke into flights of four and buzzed the airstrip before turning into their landing pattern, landing two at a time, one on each side of the runway. By landing in pairs, all sixteen fighters were on the ground in less than three minutes. Also, by taking off in pairs, it shortened the time needed to form up in a group and added time over the target.

=== Philippines Campaign ===
The squadron was immediately tasked with orders for the following day; to bomb and strafe enemy-held airfields on Mindanao, one of them being the former Del Monte Field which was used to evacuate General MacArthur to Australia in 1942. The mission was largely uneventful, with the airfields being put temporarily out of action and two enemy planes destroyed on the ground. For the next several weeks, the squadron flew missions throughout the Philippines.

On 9 January 1945, two Corps of the Sixth United States Army landed on the shores of Lingayen Gulf on Luzon, just a few miles south of where the Japanese had invaded the island on 22 December 1941. From the landing beaches, the Corps drove south to the Manila area while maintaining a strong defensive line to the North. In this liberated beachhead, two major airfields plus smaller liaison landing strips were hastily constructed. On 13 January the 3rd flew a reconnaissance mission of southeast Luzon and discovered a concentration of enemy troops and equipment attempting to cross a river using a ferry. The pilots began strafing runs which destroyed the ferry and also leveled a village at the site. The Mustangs then attacked enemy vehicles up and down the road, destroying an estimated twelve to fifteen and damaging an undetermined number of vehicles. Also a sweep over the enemy-held airfield at Bulan destroyed a Mitsubishi A6M Zero in a revetment. The next day, ten squadron aircraft escorted some North American B-25 Mitchells in a strike on some enemy positions in the town of Aparri. After destroying the target, a neighboring airfield was strafed, destroying several enemy aircraft on the ground. On the way back over the Cagayan Valley, two two-engine Japanese aircraft were seen heading north. Both enemy aircraft were shot down without loss.

On 16 January, the Japanese-held Clark Field was attacked by the squadron. After being captured in 1942, Clark Field became the main Japanese air base in the Philippines. That day, four Air Commando P-51D Mustangs caught a group of enemy aircraft on the parking ramp, with their propellers turning over slowly. Four Nakajima Ki-44s were struck by a 500-pound bomb and were destroyed. Five more enemy fighters were destroyed in strafing runs, and no squadron aircraft were damaged. The same day on Negros Island, other 3rd Fighter Squadron Mustangs discovered some camouflaged enemy aircraft on a landing strip. They were also obliterated by strafing fire, but one Mustang was hit by 20-mm antiaircraft fire and was forced to bail out over the sea. The pilot, Capt. Charles B. Adams, was picked up safely by a Consolidated PBY Catalina the next day and he was returned to the squadron. Shortly afterwards, the squadron moved up from Leyte to Lingayen Airfield on Luzon. The squadron's last mission from Tanaunan hit Baguio, the prewar summer capital of the Philippine Government. It had become the Japanese Commander in the Philippines, General Yamashita's headquarters. Sixteen Mustangs, along with Consolidated B-24 Liberators from the 22d Bombardment Group attacked the Headquarters. The target was obliterated with direct hits on administration buildings, the message center, warehouses, barracks and officer's quarters.

Unable to be re-equipped, the Japanese resorted to hiding their remaining aircraft, and few enemy aircraft were being caught in the open. Throughout the remainder of January enemy air activity in the Philippines was minimal, as the Mustangs outclassed the Japanese aircraft thoroughly. The move to Mangaldan Airfield on Luzon meant that much of the time, the Mustangs were used flying close support missions for the infantry. The drive on Manila by the Sixth Army was on a narrow front from the Lyngayen beaches, and the squadron was needed to protect the division's open flanks. The month of February saw the squadron attack a pair of Japanese ships, identified at an Akizuki-class destroyer and destroyer escort being sighted heading south in the Luzon Strait between Formosa and Luzon. Twenty-two Mustangs were assembled from both the 3rd and 4th Fighter Squadrons and loaded with 500-pound bombs. Fighters scored two direct hits on the larger vessel and two on the smaller one. The Japanese defensive gunners were accurate and several P-51s were damaged, with two going down, but both pilots were recovered.

=== Formosa ===
Although combat continued on Luzon, the main focus of the squadron was changed to the Chinese island of Formosa, about 230 miles north of Luzon. Formosa was dotted with Japanese airfields and had been the springboard for the Japanese Invasion of the Philippines on 8 December 1941, when Fifth Air Force was largely destroyed on the ground. There would be no close air support missions over Formosa, instead the Mustangs of both the 3rd and 4th Fighter Squadrons flew combat sweeps and anti-shipping strikes, escorting B-24 and B-25 bombing missions over the island. However, Formosa was also well-defended, with attacking American aircraft being lost to flack.

On 7 February, the Taakao Airfield was visited by the squadron, with no less than fifteen Japanese fighters being attacked on the ground, along with a number of vehicles. One Mustang was shot down, its pilot recovered by Air-Sea rescue. On another mission, the Mustangs intercepted a Japanese Mitsubishi G4M "Betty" bomber heading for Luzon. Dropping their wing tanks, two squadron aircraft attacked the bomber, one on each side. Their shells went completely through the bomber, shattering its cockpit. The bomber burst into flames and fell into the ocean.

=== Victory on Luzon ===
While Formosa continued to be attacked, air support for Sixth Army on Luzon was flown as well. The infantry gave both the 3rd and 4th squadrons high praise for attacking and largely destroying Japanese resistance in places such as Baguio, Antipolo, Balete Pass, and the Villa Verde Trail. The double duty of attacks on Japanese infantry and on Formosa kept the squadron busy. In March, the squadron also began attacks on the East Coast of China against enemy supply dumps, locomotives and other targets of opportunity the long-range Mustangs could find. During early April Fifth Air Force B-24 Liberators began attacking Japanese shipping in Hong Kong harbor. After rendezvousing with the bombers, fighters of the 3rd spotted two Japanese interceptors coming up from an airfield. The P-51s traded shots with the enemy before the Zeros broke off their attack.

During April, with the exception of the attack on Hong Kong and some uneventful fighter sweeps over Formosa, the 3rd and 4th Fighter Squadrons flew close support missions for the Army 32d Infantry Division which was working its way to the east and south along the Villa Verde Trail in northern Luzon. However, many times the infantrymen were just yards from enemy positions, and were too close to be supported according to conventional wisdom for air attacks. After sending some squadron members to the front lines to work with the ground commanders of the 32d, the pilots convinced the soldiers that the Air Commandos could do the job. The pilots then returned to the airfield, carefully briefed the other pilots and then proceeded to fly successful close air support missions.

In May and during June, with the Japanese retreating and being unable to be reinforced, targets for the Air Commandos became more and more scarce and planes often returned to base with their bombs. When they did find targets, their bombs were usually dropped accurately and the G.I.s then moved in to mop up. Missions to Formosa were flown regularly, although many were flown to cover rescue submarines and PBY Catalinas or to escort B-24 Liberators bombing the island. Nevertheless, P-51 sweeps over Luzon continued to have a devastating effect on the enemy, destroying numerous trucks, bridges and numerous enemy-held buildings and other structures.

By the end of June, General MacArthur declared the Luzon Campaign over, however, the Japanese remained active in the Cagayan Valley where their last forces were gathered to make their stand. During July, the fighter squadrons flew numerous missions while the infantry was closing in on enemy units.

=== Okinawa and postwar activities ===
By Mid-July 1945, orders were received to begin moving the 3rd Air Commando Group from Luzon to Ie Shima, a small island on the northeast of Okinawa. There the group would prepare for the final assault on Japan. The 3rd and 4th Fighter Squadrons remained on Luzon for the time being flying little. The final fighter sweeps against Japanese forces on Luzon was flown on 25 July, nearly a month after the declared end of the campaign. Then on 6 August news of the Atomic Bomb attack on Japan was received. A second Atomic Bomb attack on the 9th led to the end of the war when on 15 July the Japanese announced they were ready to surrender.

When the cease-fire was announced, the fighter squadrons did not move to Ie Shima until 28 August. From the base there they did get a few very long-range missions over Japan before V-J Day, flying some fighter sweeps over Kyushu, but not firing a shot. On 20 September the squadron and a few ground personnel flew to Atsugi Airfield on Honshu, refueled and then flew north to Chitose Airfield on the northern Japanese Island of Hokkaido. There the squadron was assigned an air defense mission against any rouge Soviet fighters that may find their way south. For six months, the squadron performed occupation duty and on 25 March 1946, the squadron received orders to demobilize, its members receiving transportation orders to return to the United States.

=== Lineage ===
- Constituted as 3rd Fighter Reconnaissance Squadron on 25 April 1944.

Activated on 1 May 1944
Re-designated 3rd Fighter Squadron (Commando) on 2 June 1944
Inactivated on 25 March 1946
Disbanded on 8 October 1948.

=== Assignments ===
- 3rd Air Commando Group, 1 May 1944 – 25 March 1946

=== Stations ===
- Lakeland Army Airfield, Florida, 1 May 1944
- Alachua Army Airfield, Florida, 7 August 1944
- Drew Field, Florida, 6–24 October 1944
- Leyte, Philippines, 1 December 1944
- Mangaldan, Luzon, Philippines, 26 January 1945
- Laoag, Luzon, Philippines, 19 April 1945
- Ie Shima, Okinawa, 9 August 1945

Operated from Atsugi Airfield, Japan, 20 September – 7 October 1945

- Chitose Airfield, Japan, 27 October 1945 – 25 March 1946

=== Aircraft ===
- Curtiss P-40 Warhawk, 1944
- Lockheed F-6 (P-38) Lighting, 1944
- North American P-51D Mustang, 1944–1946.
