= 318th Special Operations Squadron =

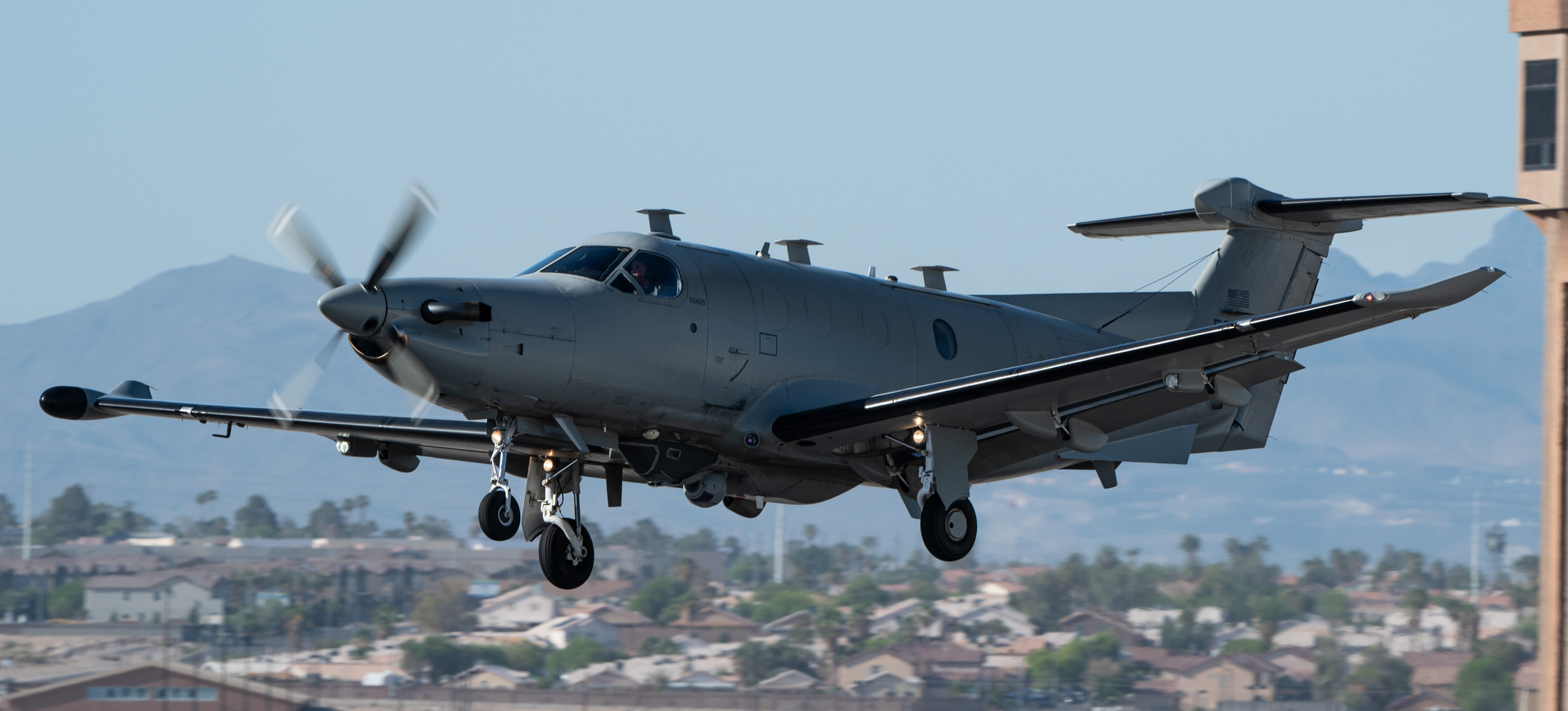
- U-28A Draco
- Active: 1944–1946; 1971–1974; 2007–present
- Country: United States
- Branch: United States Air Force
- Role: Special Operations
- Part of: Air Force Special Operations Command
- Garrison/HQ: Cannon Air Force Base, New Mexico
- Engagements: Southwest Pacific Theater
- Decorations: Philippine Presidential Unit Citation

Insignia
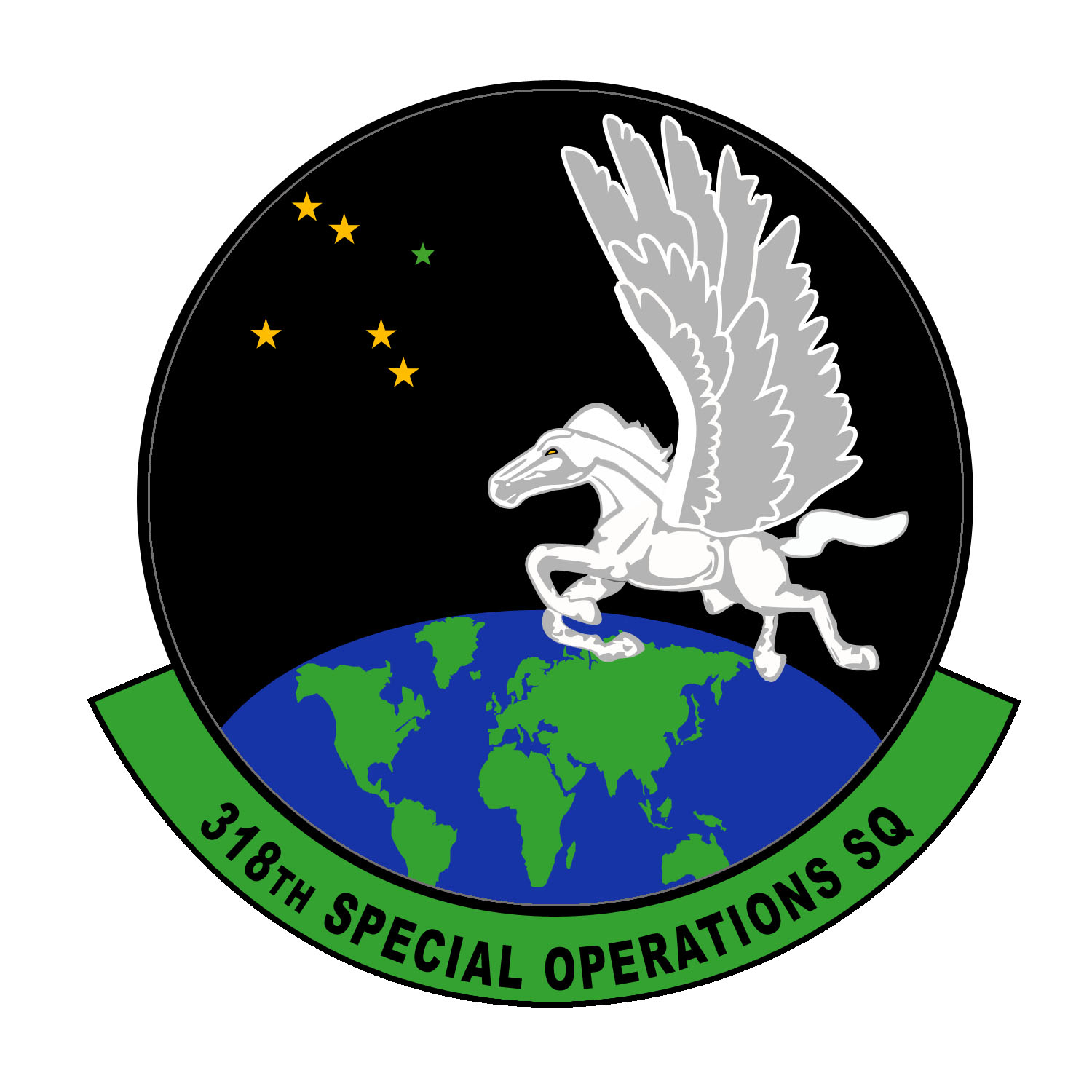
- 318th Special Operations Squadron emblem (approved 10 July 2008)

The 318th Special Operations Squadron flies the Pilatus U-28A Draco and is currently stationed at Cannon Air Force Base, New Mexico. The 318th is under the command of the Air Force Special Operations Command. The U-28A provides a manned fixed wing, on-demand/surge capability for Improved Tactical Airborne Intelligence, Surveillance, Reconnaissance and Targeting (ISR&T) in Support of Special Operations Forces.

== History ==
The squadron was activated on 1 May 1944 as the 318th Troop Carrier Squadron (Commando) at Camp Mackall, North Carolina and serving under the 3d Air Commando Group. The unit participated in the Southwest Pacific Theater, flying the Waco CG-4 glider and C-47 Skytrain transport. The squadron was inactivated 25 March 1946.

Reactivated on 15 November 1971 at Pope Air Force Base, North Carolina, the unit was stood up as the 318th Special Operations Squadron, serving under 1st Special Operations Wing. The unit's mission was to provide unconventional warfare support in Vietnam with the Lockheed C-130 Hercules until inactivation on 1 June 1974.

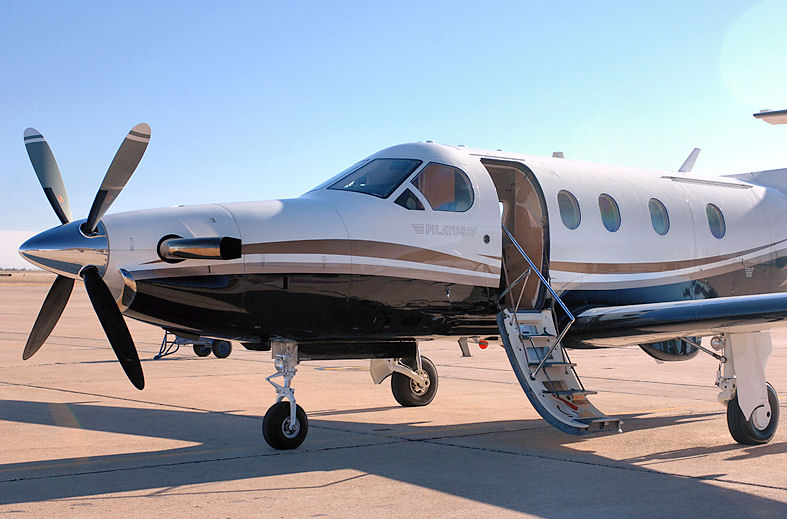
A Pilatus PC-12 of the 318th SOS at Cannon AFB.

The unit was most recently reactivated on 16 May 2008. The unit replaced a detachment that had operated the Pilatus PC-12 since 27 July 2007, first at Hurlburt Field, Florida as 1st Special Operations Group, Detachment 4, then after 30 December 2007 at Cannon Air Force Base, New Mexico as 27th Special Operations Group, Detachment 2. Flying the PC-12, crews planned, prepared, and executed nonstandard aviation missions in support of joint special operations forces while directly supporting theater special operations commanders by conducting night vision infiltration, exfiltration, resupply and other combat taskings on unimproved runways. In the same role and at the same time, the squadron also operated the C-145A Combat Coyote.

Eventually the squadron transitioned to the U-28A Draco, with the last PC-12 mission being flown in September 2016. The squadron's C-145s were moved to the 6th special operations squadron in 2013. The U-28 is a modified PC-12 which provides tactical airborne ISR to special operations forces on the ground.

== Lineage ==
- Constituted as the 318th Troop Carrier Squadron, Commando on 1 May 1944 and activated

Inactivated on 25 March 1946

- Redesignated 318th Special Operations Squadron on 21 October 1971

Activated on 15 November 1971
Inactivated on 1 June 1974
Activated on 2 May 2008

=== Assignments ===
- 3d Air Commando Group, 1 May 1944 – 25 March 1946.
- 1st Special Operations Wing, 15 November 1971 – 1 June 1974
- 27th Special Operations Group, 2 May 2008 – present

=== Stations ===
- Camp Mackall, North Carolina, 1 May 1944
- Dunnellon Army Air Field, Florida, 15 August 1944
- Camp Mackall, North Carolina, 12 September 1944
- Baer Field, Indiana, 30 September-ii October 1944
- Nadzab Airfield Complex, New Guinea, 26 October 1944;
- Leyte, Philippines, (undetermined location), 5 January 1945
- Mangaldan Airfield, Luzon, Philippines, 26 January 1945
- Laoag Airfield, Luzon, Philippines, 15 April 1945
- Ie Shima Airfield, Okinawa, 9 August 1945 (operated from Atsugi Airfield, Japan, 20 September-7 October 1945)
- Chitose Air Base, Japan, 27 October 1945 – 25 March 1946.
- Pope Air Force Base, North Carolina, 15 November 1971 – 1 June 1974
- Cannon Air Force Base, New Mexico, 2 May 2008 – present

=== Aircraft ===
- Waco CG-4, 1944
- Douglas C-47 Skytrain, 1944–1946
- Lockheed C-130 Hercules, 1971–1974
- PZL C-145A Combat Coyote, 2007–2013
- Pilatus PC-12, 2007–2016
- Pilatus U-28A Draco, 2016–today
