= Navy Occupation Service Medal =

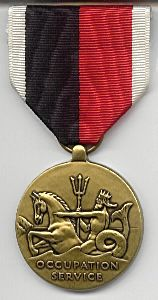
- Obverse
- Type: Military medal Service medal
- Awarded for: Occupation duty during and/or following World War II
- Presented by: Department of the Navy
- Eligibility: Navy, Marine Corps, and Coast Guard personnel
- Clasps: Europe; Asia
- Status: No longer awarded
- Established: January 22, 1947
- First award: May 8, 1945
- Final award: October 3, 1990
- Service ribbon and streamer

Precedence
- Next (higher): World War II Victory Medal
- Equivalent: Army of Occupation Medal
- Next (lower): Medal for Humane Action

The Navy Occupation Service Medal was a military award of the United States Navy which was "Awarded to commemorate the services of Navy, Marine Corps and Coast Guard personnel in the occupation of certain territories of the enemies of the United States during World War II" and recognized those personnel who participated in the European and Asian occupation forces during, and following World War II. The medal was also bestowed to personnel who performed duty in West Berlin between 1945 and 1990.

No more than one Navy Occupation Service Medal may be awarded to an individual. The Army of Occupation Medal is the equivalent of the Navy Occupation Service Medal. No person could receive both the Army and Navy occupation medals.

== Description ==
The medal was designed by A. A. Weinman. It depicts Neptune riding a Hippocampus with the words "Occupation Service". The reverse has the words "United States Navy" (or "United States Marine Corps") and is the same as that of the Dominican Campaign Medal.

== Ribbon devices ==
The medal is authorized two service clasps: "Europe" and "Asia". The clasps are rectangular with a rope border. If eligible, both clasps may be worn on the medal. The Berlin Airlift Device is also authorized to those naval personnel who have served 90 days or more with an accredited unit in support of the Berlin Airlift between 1948 and 1949.

=== Europe Clasp ===
The following geographical duty areas, and time frames of eligibility, qualified a service member to receive the Navy Occupation Service Medal with "Europe" clasp.

- Italy (November 8, 1945 to December 15, 1947)
- Trieste (May 8, 1945 to October 25, 1954)
- Germany (May 8, 1945 to May 5, 1955) (exclusive of Berlin)
- Austria (May 8, 1945 to October 25, 1955)
- West Berlin (May 8, 1945 to October 3, 1990)

Service between May 9 and November 8, 1945 may not be considered unless the service member qualified for the European-African-Middle Eastern Campaign Medal prior to that date.

=== Asia Clasp ===
The "Asia" clasp was authorized for any service performed on shore or on ships in the following geographical duty areas and time frames of eligibility.

- Japanese territories (September 2, 1945 to April 27, 1952)
- Korea and adjacent islands (September 2, 1945 to April 27, 1952)

Service prior to March 2, 1946 would not be credited toward eligibility for the Navy Occupation Service Medal unless the individual is already eligible for the Asiatic-Pacific Campaign Medal for service prior to September 2, 1945.

Service after June 27, 1950 which is eligible towards the criteria for the Korean Service Medal may not be considered for the Occupation Service Medal.

== See also ==
- Army of Occupation Medal
- Medal for Humane Action
- Awards and decorations of the United States military
