= Padsan River =

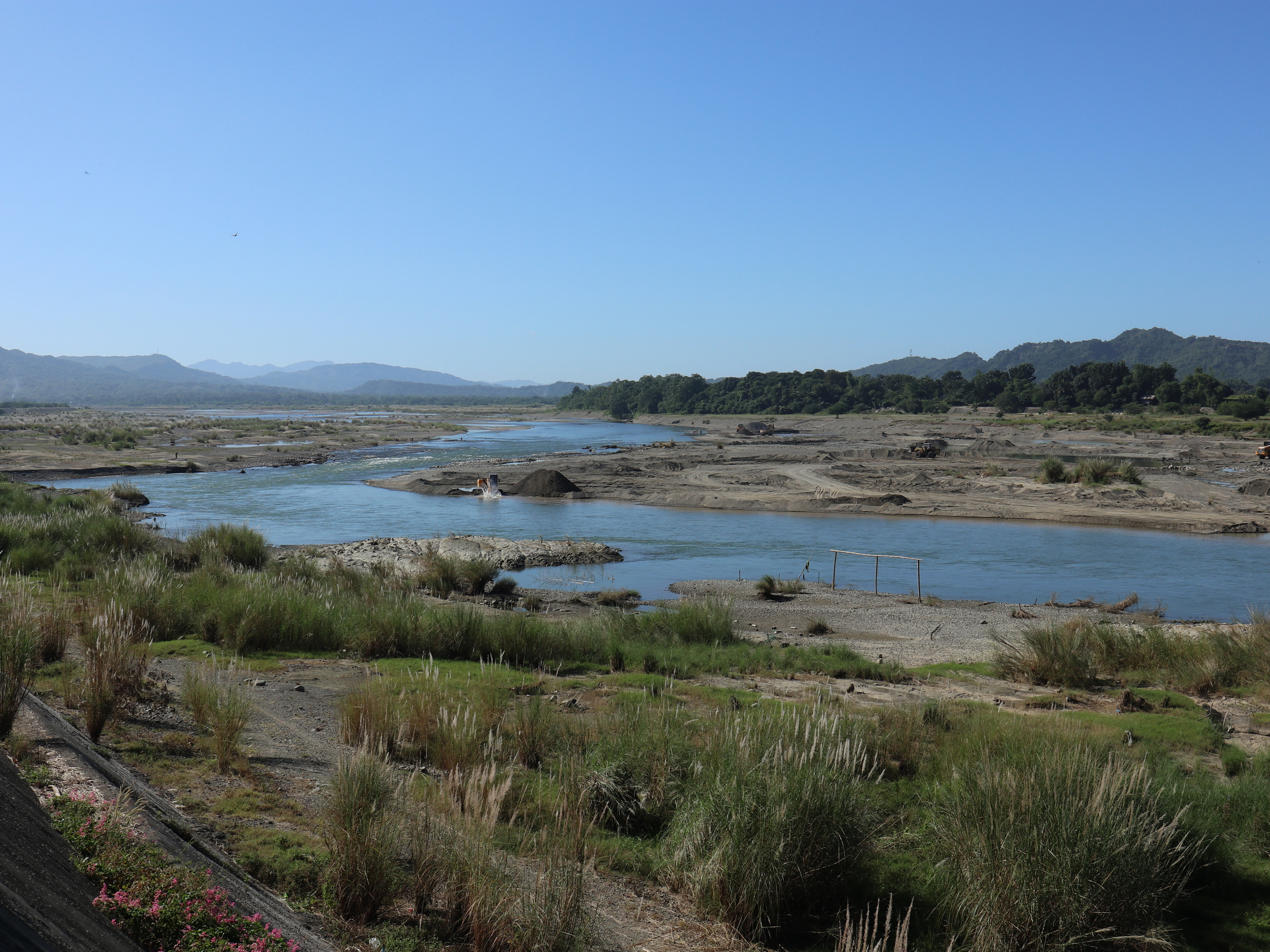
- The Padsan River in Sarrat (2022)

- Location in Luzon Location in the Philippines

Location
- Country: Philippines
- Region: Ilocos Norte

Physical characteristics
- Mouth: South China Sea
  - coordinates: 18°11′14″N 120°31′11″E
- Length: 73.1 km (45.4 mi)
- Basin size: 1,320 km2 (510 sq mi)

The Padsan River, also known as the Laoag River and the Sarrat River, is the largest river in Ilocos Norte on the island of Luzon in the Philippines. It has a total length of 73.1 kilometres (45.4 mi) and a drainage basin of 1,320 km^{2} (510 sq mi). It is notable because its main channel bisects the central townships of the municipalities of Dingras and Sarrat, as well as that of the city of Laoag, which is the capital of Ilocos Norte.

As a result, its waters have shaped the history and culture of these historic towns, and of the province of Ilocos Norte. It is the site of the Madongan Dam in Dingras, and is right beside Laoag International Airport in Laoag.
