= Bud Mahurin =

United States Air Force officer (1918–2010)

Walker Melville Mahurin
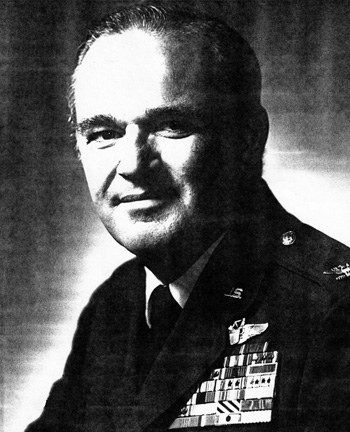
- Colonel Walker Mahurin in July 1953
- Born: December 5, 1918; Benton Harbor, Michigan, U.S.
- Died: May 11, 2010 (aged 91); Newport Beach, California, U.S.
- Burial place: Arlington National Cemetery
- Military career
- Allegiance: United States of America
- Branch: United States Army Air Forces; United States Air Force
- Service years: 1941–1956
- Rank: Colonel
- Nickname: "Bud"
- Units: 56th Fighter Group; 51st Fighter-Interceptor Wing
- Commands: 3rd Air Commando Group; 1st Fighter Group; 4th Fighter-Interceptor Group; 27th Air Division
- Conflicts: World War II; Korean War
- Awards: Distinguished Service Cross; Silver Star; Distinguished Flying Cross (8); Purple Heart; Air Medal (7)

Colonel Walker Melville "Bud" Mahurin (December 5, 1918 – May 11, 2010) was a United States Air Force officer and aviator. During World War II, while serving in the United States Army Air Forces, he was a flying ace.

Mahurin was the first American pilot to become a double ace in the European Theater. He was the only United States Air Force pilot to shoot down enemy planes in both the European and Pacific Theaters and the Korean War. During World War II he was credited with 20.75 aerial victories, making him the sixth-highest American P-47 ace. He was credited with shooting down 3.5 MiG-15s in Korea, giving him a total of 24.25 aircraft destroyed in aerial combat.

== Early life ==
Mahurin was born in Benton Harbor, Michigan and raised in Fort Wayne, Indiana, where he graduated from South Side High School in 1937. He joined the United States Army Air Forces as an aviation cadet on September 29, 1941, after several years as an engineering student at Purdue University. Mahurin graduated from pilot training on April 29, 1942.

== World War II ==
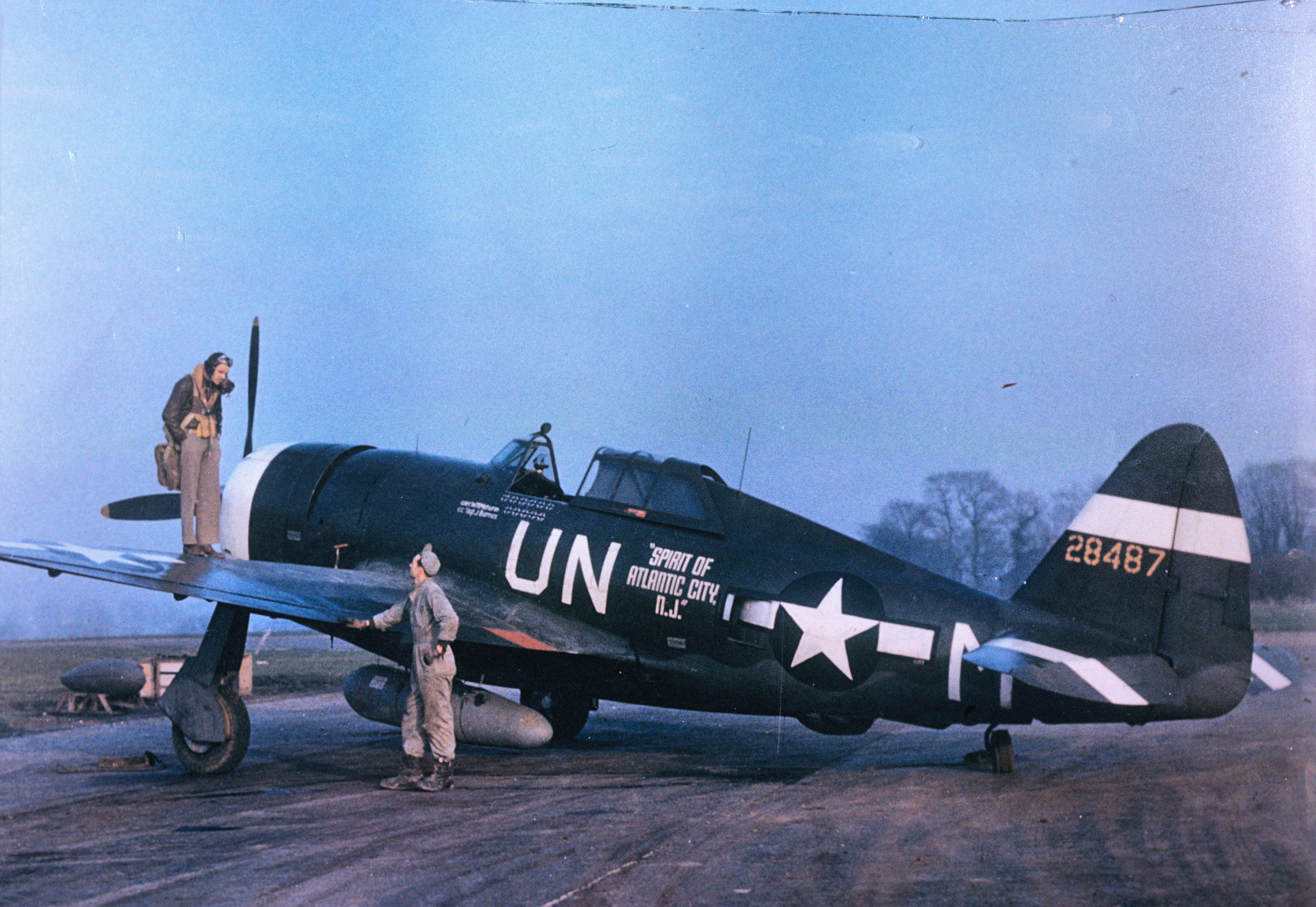
Captain Mahurin of the 56th Fighter Group standing on the port wing of his P-47 Thunderbolt aircraft, conversing with its crew chief, Staff Sergeant John E. Barnes

Mahurin was assigned to the 63d Fighter Squadron, 56th Fighter Group, and deployed to England with them in January 1943. Based at Halesworth, England, then-Captain Mahurin became a flight leader in the 63rd FS and began flying missions in May 1943. His first plane was P-47C-5-RE serial number 41-6334, that bore the squadron code UN:M.

The first aircraft he downed was unfortunately his own P-47 fighter. On a mission on August 12, 1943, he decided to inch closer and closer to within feet of a B-24 bomber that was nearby. He was caught in the B-24's prop wash and sucked under its wing, and when he tried to pull away, the tail and fuselage of his airplane was shredded by one of the B-24's propellers, forcing him to bail out. The B-24 had to crash-land.

On August 17, 1943, he scored his first aerial victories while flying a temporary replacement plane, P-47C-2-RE 41-6259, coded UN:V (normally assigned to Capt. Glen Schiltz) by shooting down a pair of German Focke-Wulf Fw 190s while escorting B-17 bombers as part of the Schweinfurt-Regensburg mission. One of these fighters was flown by Major Wilhelm "Wutz" Galland, Gruppenkommandeur of II/JG 26, and an ace with some 55 claims to his credit. The next plane that Mahurin received was the third P-47 of his career, and one that would become his primary aircraft; P-47D-5-RE 42-8487. It again bore the squadron codes UN:M and was nicknamed The Spirit of Atlantic City, N.J. (The aircraft had been "bought" courtesy of war bonds purchased (to a value approximately equivalent to the cost of a fighter) by the citizens of Atlantic City, New Jersey. Consequently, the name painted on the aircraft was chosen by Atlantic City.) Mahurin became an ace on October 4 after shooting down three Messerschmitt Bf 110s. Mahurin had his best mission on November 26, 1943, shooting down three Bf 110s, presumably shooting down another, and damaging a fourth to become the first American pilot in the European Theater of Operations to score 10 aerial victories. Mahurin scored two more victories in another aircraft, (P-47D-11-RE 42-75278, coded UN:B) on November 29, 1943. On March 8, 1944, he destroyed three Fw 190s. He eventually went on to score 19.75 confirmed victories in combat in Europe, with three more enemy planes probably destroyed, and one damaged, before being shot down himself.

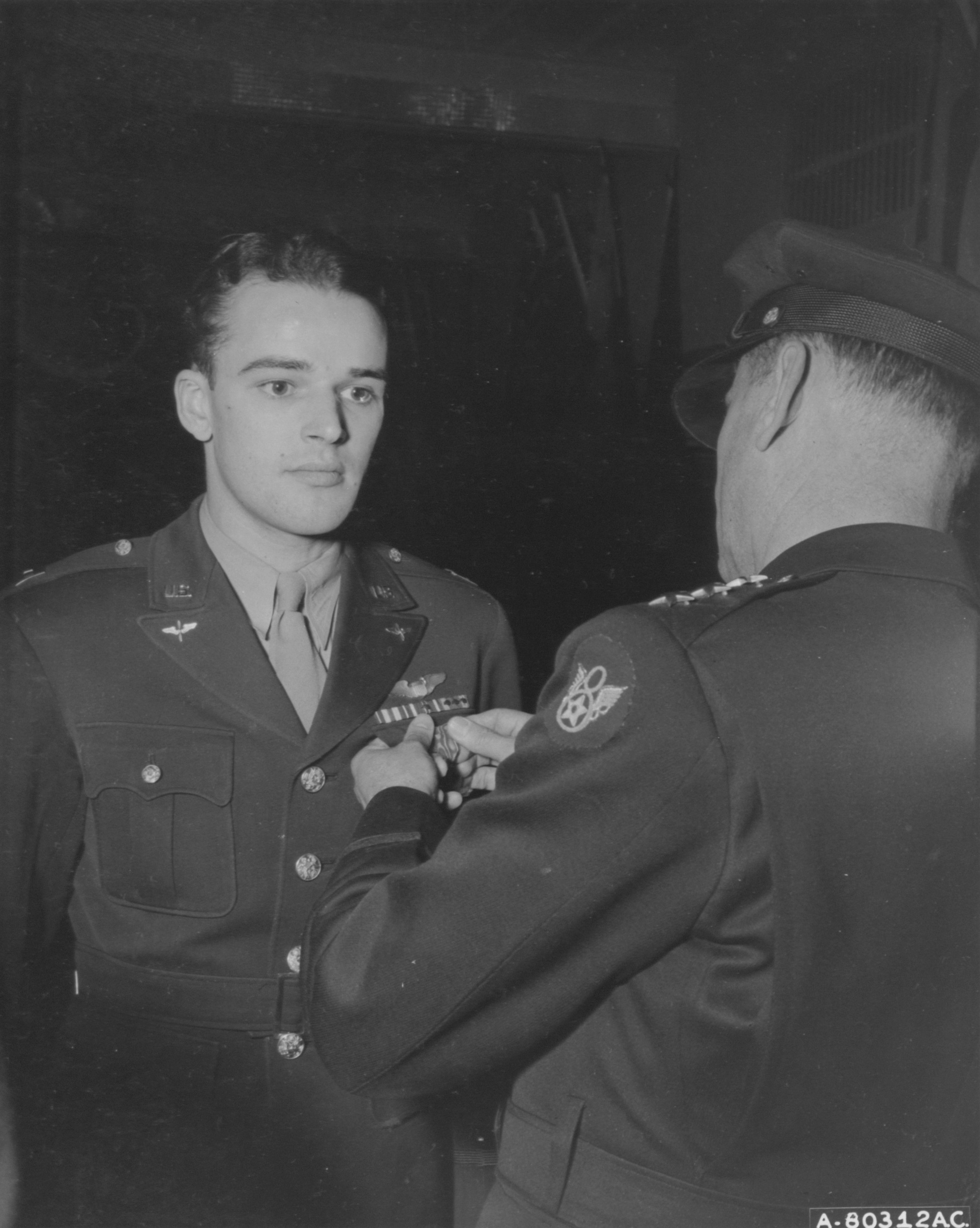
Mahurin receives the Distinguished Service Cross from Eighth Air Force commander Lt. Gen. Ira C. Eaker on December 18, 1943

Mahurin was promoted to major on March 21, 1944. On March 27, his P-47 was heavily damaged by a German Dornier Do 217 bomber he helped shoot down, forcing him to bail out. He was picked up by French Resistance forces. On the night of 3–4 May 1944, an RAF Westland Lysander attempted to retrieve Mahurin from France and fly him back to Britain. Before he could be picked up, the aircraft was shot down, and its pilot killed. The event was watched by Mahurin. The next attempt, again by a Lysander, on the night of May 6–7, was successful. Because of his knowledge of the French Resistance and the risk of interrogation if he was shot down again, Mahurin was barred from flying over Europe and returned to the United States in June 1944.

In October, he again shipped overseas as commander of the 3rd Fighter Squadron, the combat element of the composite 3rd Air Commando Group in the Philippines. While based at Mangaldan, Luzon, in January 1945 he was credited with destroying a Japanese bomber while flying a P-51 Mustang. Mahurin was promoted to lieutenant colonel on May 28, 1945, and became commander of the 3rd Air Commando Group in September 1945. He was downed by defensive fire, this time from the ground, but was rescued from his life-raft in the ocean. He ended the war with 20.75 confirmed aerial victories and he had the unique distinction of being forced to bail out in both theaters.

After the war, Mahurin returned to Purdue University and completed a degree in aeronautical engineering in 1949.

== Korean War ==
At the start of the Korean War in 1950, Mahurin was serving in the Office of the Secretary of the Air Force. In July 1951, he became commander of the 1st Fighter Group, training in the North American F-86 Sabre. In December, he began a 90-day tour of temporary duty with the 51st Fighter-Interceptor Wing at Suwon Air Base, serving as special assistant to the wing commander, Colonel Francis S. Gabreski.

Col. Mahurin helped Gabreski develop tactics and solve logistics problems. He was credited with destroying 3.5 MiG-15s while TDY with 51st FIW, bringing his total to 24.25 in both World War II and Korea. Mahurin transferred to the 4th Fighter-Interceptor Wing on March 18, 1952, to command its 4th Fighter-Interceptor Group at Kimpo AB.

He flew a F-86E named "Honest John" while serving with both fighter wings in Korea.

=== Prisoner of war ===
On May 13, 1952, while strafing a truck, his F-86 was shot down by North Korean ground fire and after crash-landing and breaking his arm, he was captured by enemy forces. Mahurin spent 16 months in a North Korean prisoner of war (POW) camp.

During his time as a prisoner of war, he was confined to a small cell, fed only enough water and food to keep him alive, and subjected to brainwashing. He was forced to endure sub-freezing conditions with minimal clothing, interrogations sometimes lasting all night, and being deprived of sleep and threatened with execution if he did not answer questions.

The North Koreans were adamant that he sign a confession that he and the US had waged germ warfare. After weeks of psychological and physical torture, Col. Mahurin, believing he was losing control, attempted suicide. He was discovered before he was able to complete the act and barely survived a tremendous loss of blood.

The interrogators finally gave up, to be replaced by a well-educated Chinese officer who spoke fluent English, brought Mahurin books, arranged for better food, and generally improved his conditions. Eventually, the Chinese officer's real purpose emerged – to get a confession of germ warfare by persuasion rather than threats.

He reminded Mahurin that the allies did not know he was a prisoner of war, so he could be held until his death, never to see his wife and children again. Bud Mahurin, at last, agreed to write a "confession." Unknown to him, the war had already ended.

His experience in enduring brainwashing techniques provided the U.S. with invaluable material to develop survival training courses. Nevertheless, he and other returning prisoners of war were condemned by Senator Richard Russell, Jr. and others because of their confessions. He was subsequently promoted to full colonel.

== Civilian life ==
After his release, Colonel Mahurin was assigned as vice commander of the 27th Air Division. Because of his position on the promotion list, it seemed unlikely that he would be promoted to full colonel and be considered for a star and a higher command in his remaining years of service. He therefore resigned his commission in 1956 to accept a senior position with the aircraft industry. Later he joined the Air Force Reserve, subsequently retiring as a Colonel. While the Air Force attributed this to his own choice, stating he was low on the promotion list to colonel and unlikely to make general, a pilot under his command in Korea, Robert Smith, asserts that the Air Force dishonored itself by pressuring Mahurin to resign from the service as a result of political infighting over the confessions, four years short of becoming eligible for retirement benefits.

Mahurin died of "complications from a stroke" at his home in Newport Beach, California, on May 11, 2010, and is buried at Arlington National Cemetery.

He married twice. His first marriage, to Patricia (née Sweet), ended in a divorce. His second wife was Joan (née Gill). He had two sons and a daughter from his first marriage.

== Aerial combat credits ==
Chronicle of aerial victories
Date	#	Type	Location	Aircraft flown	Unit Assigned
August 17, 1943	2	Fw 190	Liège, Belgium	P-47D	63 FS, 56 FG
September 9, 1943	1	Fw 190	Beauvais, France	P-47D	63 FS, 56FG
October 4, 1943	3	Bf 110	Düren, Germany	P-47D	63 FS, 56 FG
November 3, 1943	0.5	Bf 109	Esens, Germany	P-47D	63 FS, 56 FG
November 3, 1943	1	Bf 110	Juist, East Frisian Islands	P-47D	63 FS, 56 FG
November 26, 1943	2	Bf 110	Oldenburg, Germany	P-47D	63 FS, 56 FG
November 29, 1943	2	Bf 109	Papenburg, Germany	P-47D	63 FS, 56 FG
December 22, 1943	2	Bf 109	Hesepe, Germany	P-47D	63 FS, 56 FG
January 30, 1944	1	Ju 88	Quakenbrück, Germany	P-47D	63 FS, 56 FG
February 3, 1944	1	Bf 109	Rühlertwist, Germany	P-47D	63 FS, 56 FG
March 6, 1944	1	Fw 190	Wesendorf, Germany	P-47D	63 FS, 56 FG
March 8, 1944	3	Fw 190	Wesendorf, Germany	P-47D	63 FS, 56 FG
March 27, 1944	0.25	Do 217	Chartres, France	P-47D	63 FS, 56 FG
January 14, 1945	1	Ki-46 Dinah	Luzon, Philippines	P-51D	3 FS, 3 ACG
January 6, 1952	1	MiG-15	North Korea	North American F-86E Sabre	51 FIW
February 17, 1952	1	MiG-15	North Korea	F-86E	25 FIS, 51 FIW
March 5, 1952	1.5	MiG-15	North Korea	F-86E	25 FIS, 51 FIW

SOURCES: Air Force Historical Study 85: USAF Credits for the Destruction of Enemy Aircraft, World War II and Air Force Historical Study 81: USAF Credits for the Destruction of Enemy Aircraft, Korean War, Freeman, The Mighty Eighth

== Awards and decorations ==
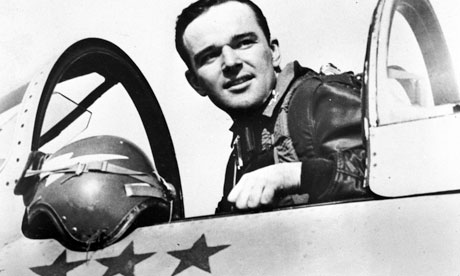
Mahurin in Korea

Command pilot

Distinguished Service Cross
Silver Star
Distinguished Flying Cross with silver and two bronze oak leaf clusters
Purple Heart
Air Medal with silver and bronze oak leaf clusters
Air Force Presidential Unit Citation
Prisoner of War Medal
American Defense Service Medal
American Campaign Medal
Asiatic-Pacific Campaign Medal with four bronze campaign stars
European-African-Middle Eastern Campaign Medal with two bronze campaign stars
World War II Victory Medal
Army of Occupation Medal with 'Japan' clasp
National Defense Service Medal with one bronze service star
Korean War Service Medal with two bronze campaign stars

Air Force Longevity Service Award with silver and bronze oak leaf clusters

Philippine Liberation Medal

Philippine Independence Medal

Armed Forces Reserve Medal with silver hourglass device

Distinguished Flying Cross (United Kingdom)

Croix de Guerre with Palm (France)

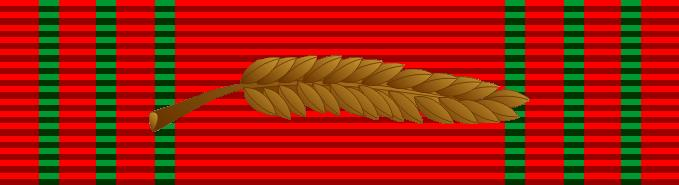
Croix de Guerre, with Palm (Belgium)

Republic of Korea Presidential Unit Citation

United Nations Service Medal

Korean War Service Medal

=== Distinguished Service Cross citation ===

Mahurin, Walker
Captain, U.S Army Air Corps
63d Fighter Squadron, 56th Fighter Group, 8th Air Force
Date of Action: October 4, 1943
Headquarters, European Theater of Operations: General Orders No. 96 (December 16, 1943)
Citation:

The President of the United States of America, authorized by Act of Congress July 9, 1918, takes pleasure in presenting the Distinguished SERVICE Cross to Captain (Air Corps) Walker M. Mahurin, United States Army Air Forces, for extraordinary heroism in connection with military operations against an armed enemy while serving as Pilot of a P-47 Fighter Airplane in the 63d Fighter Squadron, 56th Fighter Group, EIGHTH Air Force, over enemy occupied continental Europe on 4 October 1943, while serving as flight leader on a mission escorting withdrawing bombers. Though confronted with superior numbers of enemy aircraft and at a disadvantage because of altitude, he vigorously and aggressively attacked the enemy, destroying two planes and assisted in the dispersal of the enemy formation. Immediately thereafter Captain Mahurin chased an enemy fighter far into Germany, where he destroyed it. The heroism displayed by Captain Mahurin on this occasion reflects the highest credit upon himself and the armed forces of the United States.
