= Laoag International Airport =

Airport serving Laoag, Ilocos Norte, Philippines

Laoag International Airport Sangalubongan a Pagpatayaban ti Laoag Paliparang Pandaigdig ng Laoag
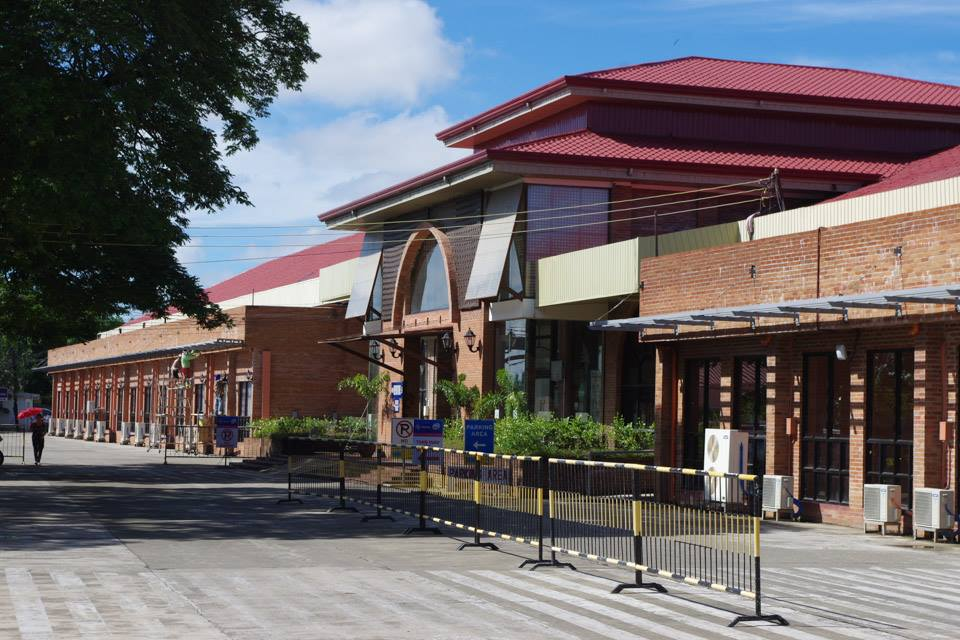
- The airport's terminal exterior
- IATA: LAO; ICAO: RPLI; WMO: 98223

Summary
- Airport type: Public
- Owner/Operator: Civil Aviation Authority of the Philippines
- Serves: Laoag
- Location: Laoag, Ilocos Norte, Philippines
- Time zone: PHT (UTC+08:00)
- Elevation AMSL: 8 m (26 ft)
- Coordinates: 18°10′41″N 120°31′55″E

Map
- Location within Luzon Location within Philippines

Runways
Direction	Length		Surface
Direction	m	ft	Surface
01/19	2,784	9,134	Concrete

Statistics (2022)
- Passengers: 78,229 ▲1,201.65%
- Aircraft movements: 1,106 ▼69.43%
- Cargo (in kg): 2,035,551 ▲949.16%
- Source: CAAP

Laoag International Airport (IATA: LAO, ICAO: RPLI) is an airport serving the general area of Laoag, the capital city of the province of Ilocos Norte in the Philippines. It is the only airport in Ilocos Norte and is the northernmost international airport in the Philippines.

The land on which the airport sits today is located near the La Paz Sand Dunes at the mouth of the Padsan River. It has one 2,784-meter runway and is designated as a secondary/alternate international airport by the Civil Aviation Authority of the Philippines, a body of the Department of Transportation responsible for the operations of not only this airport but also of all other airports in the Philippines except the major international airports.

== History ==
=== Early history ===
During the American colonial period, a military airfield located in the northern part of Luzon became imperative. Laoag, the most populated settlement at the time was chosen as the site. It became known as Gabu Airfield.

=== World War II ===
During the initial invasion of the Japanese in the Philippines in December 1941, Gabu Airfield was captured and subsequently used. During the Luzon campaign to retake the islands from the Japanese, Major Simeon Valdez led a raid on the airfield, burning the headquarters and setting fire to a fuel dump. Similar attacks follow in the succeeding days until its abandonment on February 15, 1945 due to Commonwealth military and guerrilla raids. It was then recaptured on February 27, 1945.

By April 1945 the airfield was again operational hosting fighter and transport aircraft. Colonel Arvid E. Olson, Jr. became the Base Commander and assumed all its administrative functions. The airfield became a staging area for flights and air missions against Japanese forces in Northern Luzon by April and became an important refueling point for planes en route to Okinawa and an even more important emergency and rescue base for planes returning from Formosa and China.

=== Contemporary history ===
After the war, the airfield was converted into a civilian airport. It mostly catered to domestic flights from Manila and international flights from nearby countries of China, Hong Kong and Singapore and as far as Honolulu, Hawaii.

In 2003, the airport was an epicenter of concern for authorities during the 2002–2004 SARS outbreak during which it continued to receive flights from China and Singapore, two of the most affected countries.

The airport became one of the stops of the Breitling DC-3 World Tour held in April 2017. The aircraft, a Douglas DC-3 with the registration number HB-IRJ landed for refueling as part of a round-the-world flight to celebrate the plane's 77th birthday.

The airport was also where 4 FA-50 light fighter aircraft were stored during the testing of Israeli radars on Paredes Air Station in Pasuquin, Ilocos Norte. There are plans to store FA-50s on the airport as a warning squadron for any disaster/threat to the northern part of the Philippines.

The terminal building's ceiling and floor were damaged by the onslaught of Typhoon Doksuri (Egay) in Northern Luzon in July 2023.

== Structure ==
=== Runway ===
The airport currently has a single 2,784-meter (9,134 ft) with 45 meters (148 ft) of width. The runway runs at a direction of 01°/19°. It is equipped with runway lights but not an instrument landing system, limiting operations during severe weather. Since March 2022, the airport can accommodate wide-body aircraft such as the Airbus A330.

=== Terminal ===
A single terminal building serves both passenger and cargo traffic. As an international airport, it houses immigration desks for screening of arriving international passengers. It is also equipped with a carousel baggage at the reclaim area for passengers with checked-in items.

The terminal previously had a combined capacity of 140 international and domestic passengers. It has since been expanded in 2021 to accommodate 200 international and 240 domestic passengers.

== Airlines and destinations ==
Airlines	Destinations
Cebu Pacific	Manila
PAL Express	Manila
Sky Pasada	Basco, Binalonan, Calayan

== Statistics ==
Data from Civil Aviation Authority of the Philippines (CAAP). An em dash (—) is used if data from CAAP is not available.

Year	Passenger movements				Aircraft movements				Cargo movements (in kg)			
Year	Domestic	International	Total	% change	Domestic	International	Total	% change	Domestic	International	Total	% change
2002	35,766	149,995	185,761	Steady	2,384	1,796	4,180	Steady	487,250	1,671,107	2,158,357	Steady
2003	32,793	66,894	99,687	▼46.34	3,378	1,382	4,760	▲13.88	546,811	2,482,738	3,029,549	▲40.36
2004	43,435	91,434	134,869	▲35.29	2,444	1,446	3,890	▼18.28	906,908	1,938,637	2,845,545	▼6.07
2005	52,131	67,331	119,462	▼11.42	1,658	1,660	3,318	▼14.70	1,370,561	956,243	2,326,804	▼18.23
2006	55,677	73,180	128,857	▲7.86	1,344	1,814	3,158	▼4.82	1,012,878	1,787,887	2,800,765	▲20.37
2007	96,444	46,162	142,606	▲10.67	1,844	542	2,386	▼24.45	1,967,914	893,085	2,860,999	▲2.15
2008	117,646	38,673	156,319	▲9.62	2,724	394	3,118	▲30.68	2,011,807	456,985	2,468,792	▼13.71
2009	125,087	10,386	135,473	▼13.34	3,002	188	3,190	▲2.31	2,244,994	108,338	2,353,332	▼4.68
2010	147,883	29,456	177,339	▲30.90	1,231	212	1,443	▼54.76	2,519,297	42,930	2,562,227	▲8.88
2011	144,073	2,606	146,679	▼17.29	953	152	1,105	▼23.42	18,565,134	189	18,565,323	▲624.58
2012	180,097	7,951	188,048	▲28.20	2,912	68	2,980	▲169.68	2,698,932	2,380	2,701,312	▼85.45
2013	232,034	10,982	243,016	▲29.23	2,756	116	2,872	▼3.62	2,623,496	75,130	2,698,626	▼0.10
2014	193,237	3,200	196,437	▼19.17	3,172	32	3,204	▲11.56	2,528,669	23,470	2,552,139	▼5.43
2015	175,529	29,021	204,550	▲4.13	3,292	1,182	4,474	▲39.64	2,844,889	70,196	2,915,085	▲14.22
2016	188,664	15,492	204,156	▼0.19	3,456	1,260	4,716	▲5.41	3,143,780	121,424	3,265,204	▲12.01
2017	146,960	14,059	161,019	▼21.13	3,483	1,224	4,707	▼0.19	2,945,989	118,143	3,064,132	▼6.16
2018	150,214	1,594	151,808	▼5.72	3,371	1,515	4,886	▲3.80	3,277,172	11,544	3,288,716	▲7.33
2019	143,054	–	143,054	▼5.77	9,579	1,250	10,829	▲121.63	3,103,939	–	3,103,939	▼5.62
2020	35,780	–	35,780	▼74.99	2,877	986	3,863	▼64.33	849,802	–	849,802	▼72.62
2021	6,010	297	6,307	▼82.37	3,618	–	3,618	▼6.34	156,904	37,113	194,017	▼77.17
2022	78,229	–	78,229	▲1,201.65	1,106	–	1,106	▼69.43	2,035,551	–	2,035,551	▲949.16
2023	187,069	–	187,069	▲139.13	1,636	–	1,636	0.00	3,704,578	–	3,704,578	▲81.99
2024	206,096	–	206,096	▲10.17	1,936	–	1,936	▲75.05	3,441,669	–	3,441,669	▼7.10

== Accidents and incidents ==
- On August 28, 1945, a Douglas C-47 Skytrain (serial number 42-100717) was conducting a military flight from Laoag, Philippines, to Naha, Okinawa, when it encountered severe weather conditions approximately 250 miles southwest of Okinawa. The aircraft entered a squall line with thunderstorms and turbulence, lost control, and crashed into the sea. All 19 occupants—five crew members and fourteen passengers—were presumed killed. No wreckage or bodies were recovered. The probable cause was loss of control due to severe turbulence.
- On October 13, 1945, a Douglas C-47 Skytrain (serial number 43-49754) was conducting a military flight from Yontan Airfield, Okinawa, to Laoag, Philippines, when it disappeared over the Pacific Ocean. The aircraft was presumed lost at sea, and all six crew members were killed.
- On January 11, 1947, a Douglas C-54 Skymaster (registration PI-C100) operated by Far East Air Transport was on a scheduled flight from Shanghai to Manila when engine number two caught fire approximately 130 kilometres off the airport. The pilot performed a ditching manoeuvre in the sea. Seven passengers were killed, while 35 other occupants survived. The aircraft was destroyed. The probable cause was determined to be an engine fire.
- On April 1, 1989, a Fokker F27 Friendship (registration 10616) operated by the Philippine Air Force overran Runway 01 during landing. The aircraft failed to stop within the available runway length and came to rest in the nearby Padsan River. All occupants survived, and no casualties were reported. The aircraft was built in 1981 and had accumulated 2,401 flight hours and 1,246 cycles at the time of the incident.
- On June 28, 2023, VietJet Air Flight 975 made a diversionary landing on the airport following a technical fault; the Airbus A321 aircraft departed from Incheon International Airport in South Korea en route to Phu Quoc, Vietnam. None of the passengers or crew members were hurt.

== See also ==
- Louis Edward Curdes
- 3d Fighter Squadron (Commando), an American air unit based in Laoag during World War II
- 353d Special Operations Group, formerly known as 3d Air Commando Group, another air unit based in Laoag during World War II
