= 353rd Special Operations Wing =

US Air Force unit

353rd Special Operations Wing

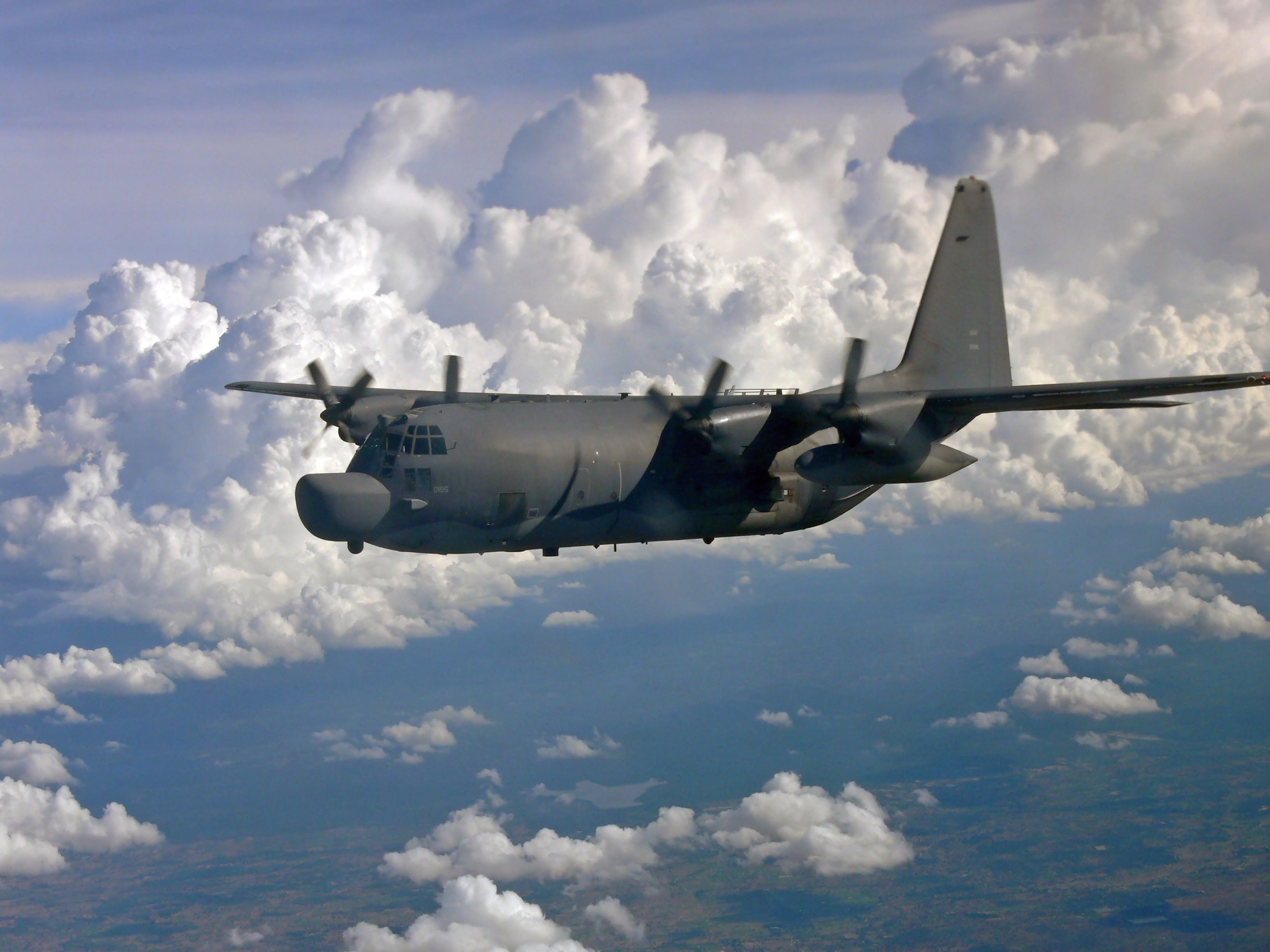
- A 353rd Wing MC-130H Combat Talon II flies a training mission (Note: Aircraft is Lockheed MC-130H Combat Talon II, serial 88-0195 from the 1st Special Operations Squadron during an exercise in Bangladesh on 9 June 2006.)
- Active: 1944–1946; 1967–1970; 1989–present
- Country: United States
- Branch: United States Air Force
- Role: Special operations
- Size: 721 personnel authorized: 709 military personnel; 13 civilian personnel
- Part of: Air Force Special Operations Command
- Garrison/HQ: Kadena Air Base, Japan
- Nickname: Batcats
- Motto: Cavete Cattam (Latin for 'Beware the Cat')
- Engagements: Southwest Pacific Theater; Vietnam War
- Decorations: Air Force Meritorious Unit Award; Air Force Outstanding Unit Award with Combat "V" Device; Air Force Outstanding Unit Award; Philippine Republic Presidential Unit Citation; Republic of Vietnam Gallantry Cross with Palm

Insignia
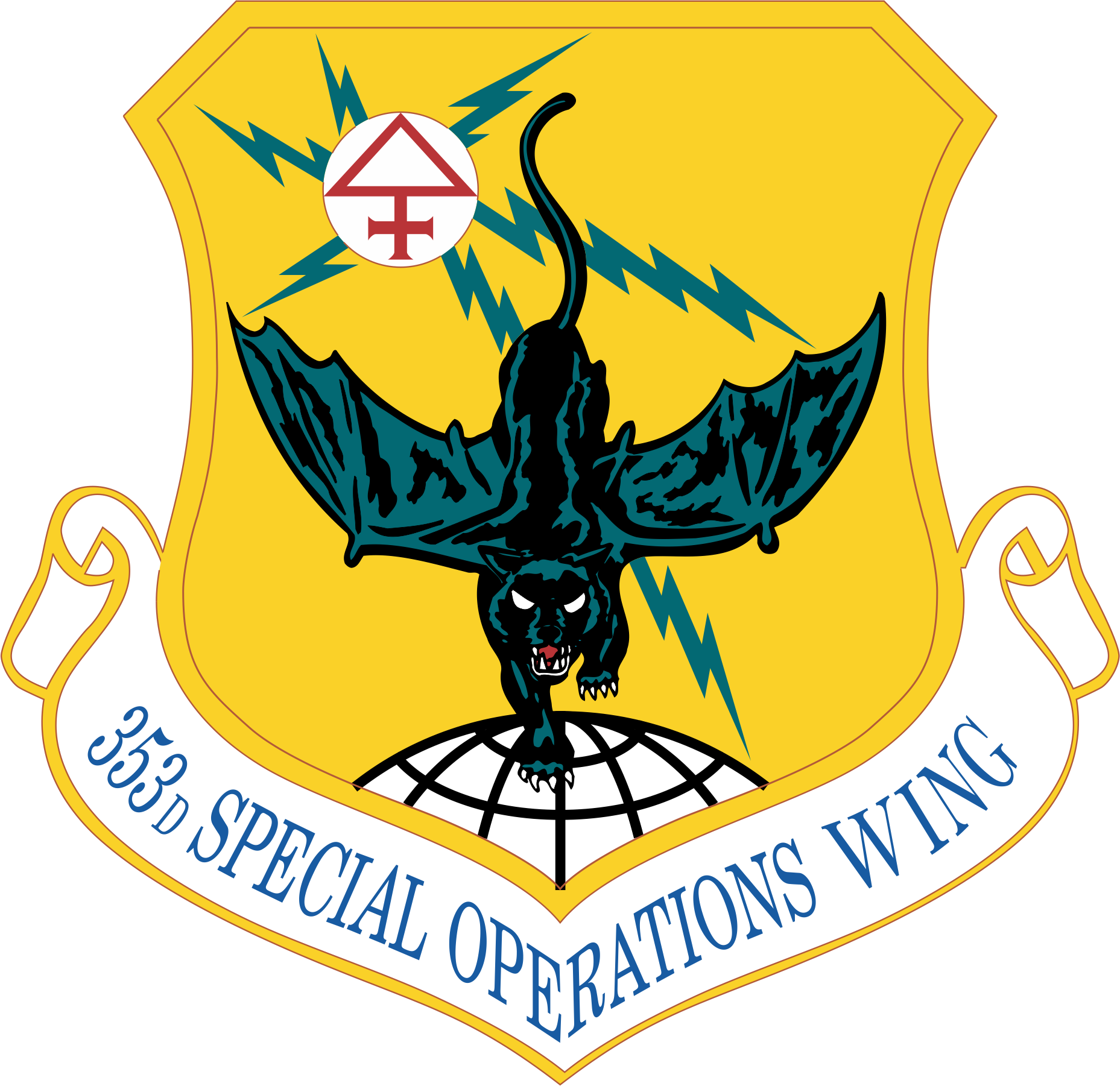
- 353rd Special Operations Wing emblem (Note: Approved 19 June 1967, reinstated 29 March 2010.)

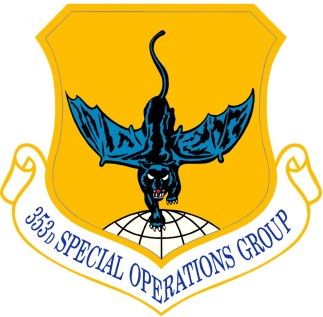
- 353rd Special Operations Group emblem (Note: Approved c. 1994.)

The 353rd Special Operations Wing is an operational unit of the United States Air Force Special Operations Command, stationed at Kadena Air Base, Japan.

The Wing's first predecessor was activated in 1944 as the 3rd Air Commando Group. The unit was assigned to Fifth Air Force in the Philippines in 1944 for operations with North American P-51 Mustangs, Douglas C-47 Skytrains, and Stinson L-5 Sentinels. It attacked Japanese airfields and installations in the Philippines, supported ground forces on Luzon, and provided escort for missions to Formosa and the China coast. It also made raids on airfields and railways on Formosa, and furnished cover for convoys. In addition, the group transported personnel, dropped supplies to ground troops and guerrilla forces, evacuated casualties from front-line strips, adjusted artillery fire, and flew courier and mail routes.

The second predecessor of the Wing is the 553rd Reconnaissance Wing, which conducted electronic surveillance, particularly of the Ho Chi Minh Trail, in Southeast Asia from 1967 to 1970. The two units were consolidated in 1985 under the wing designation. In 1989, the consolidated unit was activated as the 353rd Special Operations Wing. In 1992, it was redesignated as the 353rd Special Operations Group, and in July 2021, it was redesignated back to 353rd Special Operations Wing.

== Mission ==
The 353rd Special Operations Wing is the United States Air Force special forces contribution to the U.S. Special Operations Command, Pacific, a subcommand of the United States Pacific Command.

== Units ==
The 353rd Special Operations Wing consists of the following squadrons:

- 1st Special Operations Squadron, at Kadena Air Base (MC-130J Commando II)
- 21st Special Operations Squadron, at Yokota Air Base (CV-22B Osprey)
- 320th Special Tactics Squadron, at Kadena Air Base (Pararescue, Combat Controller, Special Reconnaissance)
- 353rd Special Operations Aircraft Maintenance Squadron, at Kadena Air Base
- 21st Special Operations Aircraft Maintenance Squadron, (formerly 753rd), at Yokota Air Base
- 353rd Special Operations Support Squadron, at Kadena Air Base

== History ==
=== World War II ===
When activated, the 3rd Air Commando Group trained to establish and maintain an airstrip behind enemy lines, to provide for its own supply and air defense, to attack targets in the enemy's rear areas, and to furnish air support for ground operations. The group's headquarters, liaison, and airdrome squadrons, as well as its medical dispensary and the ground echelons of the 3rd Fighter Squadron (Commando) and 318th Troop Carrier Squadron sailed from the west coast in early November 1944, arriving on Leyte on 1 December 1944. The ground echelon of the 4th Fighter Squadron (Commando) sailed a week later and arrived on Leyte in early January 1945. The flying personnel of the 3rd and 4th Fighter Squadrons, as well as some enlisted members of their engineering sections, were air-transported to Nadzab, New Guinea, where they received the group's new P-51 aircraft.

The separated squadrons flew patrol missions in New Guinea until joining the group on Leyte in January 1945. Began combat in the Philippines by flying bombing and strafing missions against airdromes on Mindanao. Later, on Luzon, the fighters continued bombing and strafing missions. In addition, the group provided air support to ground forces, flew fighter sweeps to Formosa, and escorted heavy bombers on bombing missions to Formosa and the China coast. The air echelon of the 318th Troop Carrier Squadron flew their C-47s across the Pacific, arriving at Nadzab, New Guinea, in late October 1944. The squadron carried cargo and passengers and air-evacuated wounded soldiers to Australia until it moved to Leyte in mid-January 1945. While on Luzon, this squadron also para-dropped supplies to ground forces. The liaison squadrons received their L-5s in late January 1945, and thereafter evacuated wounded from advanced points, flew courier, search and rescue, and reconnaissance missions, spotted for signal aircraft warning battalions, and dropped supplies to allied and guerrilla forces.

In April 1945, the group, less the liaison squadrons, moved from Mandaldan, in Lingayen Gulf, to Laoag, in northwest Luzon, in recently captured territory 150 miles behind enemy lines. The group operated the base and the 318th Troop Carrier Squadron provided most of the resupply. The group set up air-ground support stations that directed aircraft to targets and tactical radio ground stations situated with U.S. and guerrilla ground forces. In June 1945 Laoag became the staging field for flights to Okinawa.

In August 1945, the group moved to Ie Shima, in the Ryukyus, from where the fighter squadrons flew surveillance missions over Japan. The 318 TCS participated in the evacuation of allied prisoners of war from Japan. By the end of October 1945, the group moved to Chitose Air Base, Japan. By February 1946 the squadrons were reduced to paper strength and the group inactivated the next month.

=== Vietnam War ===
Beginning in February 1967, the 553rd Reconnaissance Wing trained to support a special electronic reconnaissance program utilizing 30 Lockheed EC-121R Batcat aircraft, with a C-121G used for pilot and flight engineer training. Moved to Thailand in increments beginning mid-September 1967 and began day and night unarmed reconnaissance missions over Southeast Asia on 25 November 1967. A wing detachment at Nakhon Phanom Royal Thai Air Force Base, Thailand, performed combat evaluation of YQU-22A aircraft and associated equipment, December 1968 – August 1969. From July to early September 1970 the wing provided combat evaluation of the QU-22B aircraft and on 1 October 1970 the QU-22Bs were placed in full operation, reducing the need for EC-121s.

Strength of the wing was reduced in both personnel and equipment, and in mid-December 1970 the 553rd Reconnaissance Wing inactivated. One reconnaissance squadron, the 553rd Reconnaissance Squadron, was reassigned to the 388th Tactical Fighter Wing and stayed at Korat Royal Thai Air Force Base. The 554th Reconnaissance squadron was inactivated with that squadron number then assigned to what was Detachment 1 at Nakon Phanom RTAFB. The last 553rd Reconnaissance EC-121R mission occurred on 6 December 1971.

=== Special operations in the Pacific ===
The 353rd Special Operations Wing was activated on 6 April 1989 in the Philippines to train for unconventional warfare and special operations activities in the Pacific area of operations. Maintained capabilities by participating in joint/combined and other theater exercises and training opportunities. Also maintained helicopter air refueling operations and supported humanitarian and disaster relief operations, as well as performed some search and rescue and aeromedical evacuation missions.

Following the destruction of Clark Air Base during the volcanic eruptions of Mount Pinatubo in June 1991, the group temporarily operated from bases on Okinawa, then officially relocated there in February 1992, with one squadron moving forward to South Korea.

Redesignated as the 353rd Special Operations Group on 1 December 1992, but continued operations as before. The group consisted of the 1st, 17th and 31st Special Operations Squadrons together with 353rd Special Operations Maintenance Squadron and 353rd Special Operations Support Squadron.

The 320th Special Tactics Squadron was assigned to the group on 1 January 1993.

In February 1996 developed Taegu Air Base in South Korea as a special operations training base. Gained a weather flight in April 1996 and began providing weather support for U.S. Army Special Forces at Torii Station, Japan.

From December 1996 periodically deployed aircraft and personnel to Italy to support NATO operations in the Balkans and to Southwest Asia to support allied operations against Iraq.

On 31 August 2001, the 31st Special Operations Squadron was inactivated.

Throughout its history, the unit has been extremely active in humanitarian assistance and disaster relief. In 2005, the unit supported Operation UNIFIED ASSISTANCE, the relief effort from the 2004 Indian Ocean tsunami. In 2011, the unit supported Operation TOMODACHI, the relief effort from the great East Japan earthquake and tsunami of 2011. In 2013, the unit supported Operation Damayan, the relief effort from Super Typhoon Haiyan in the Philippines. In 2018, the unit assisted with the Thai cave rescue.

== Lineage ==
3rd Air Commando Group

- Established as the 3rd Air Commando Group on 25 April 1944

Activated on 1 May 1944
Inactivated on 25 March 1946
Disestablished on 8 October 1948

- Reestablished and consolidated with the 553rd Reconnaissance Wing as the 353rd Reconnaissance Wing on 31 July 1985

553rd Reconnaissance Wing

- Established as the 553rd Reconnaissance Wing on 9 February 1967 (not organized)

Organized on 25 February 1967
Inactivated on 15 December 1970

- Consolidated with the 3rd Air Commando Group as the 353rd Reconnaissance Wing on 31 July 1985

353rd Special Operations Wing

- Redesignated 353rd Special Operations Wing on 21 March 1989

Activated on 6 April 1989
Redesignated 353rd Special Operations Group on 1 December 1992
Redesignated 353rd Special Operations Wing on 14 July 2021

=== Assignments ===
- III Fighter Command, 1 May 1944
- Fifth Air Force, c. 1 December 1944
- V Fighter Command, c. 13 December 1944
- 86th Fighter Wing, c. 18 December 1944 (under operational control of 308 Bombardment Wing after 26 January 1945)
- V Fighter Command, c. 11 May 1945 – 25 March 1946 (remained under operational control of 308th Bombardment Wing through 28 May 1945, under operational control of 309th Bombardment Wing, 29 May–c. 8 August 1945 and after c. 27 October 1945)
- Air Defense Command, 9 February 1967 (not organized)
- First Air Force, 25 February 1967 (attached to Thirteenth Air Force after 19 October 1967)
- Thirteenth Air Force, 31 October 1967 – 15 December 1970 (under operational control of Seventh Air Force)
- Twenty-Third Air Force (later Air Force Special Operations Command), 6 April 1989 – present

=== Components ===
World War II

- 3rd Fighter Squadron (Commando): 1 May 1944 – 25 March 1946 (air echelon detached 7 November 1944 – 7 January 1945).
- 4th Fighter Squadron (Commando): 1 May 1944 – 25 March 1946 (ground echelon detached 7 November 1944 – 5 January 1945; air echelon detached 7 November 1944 – 16 January 1945).
- 157th Liaison Squadron: 1 May 1944 – 10 November 1945 (detached 1 May – c. 18 August 1944 and 3 May – 10 November 1945).
- 159th Liaison Squadron: 1 May 1944 – 15 December 1945 (detached 1 May – c. 18 August 1944 and 3 May – 15 December 1945).
- 160th Liaison Squadron: 1 May 1944 – 15 December 1945 (detached 1 May – c. 18 August 1944 and 3 May – 15 December 1945).
- 318th Troop Carrier Squadron: 1 May 1944 – 25 March 1946 (detached 1 May – 14 August 1944; ground echelon detached 12 September – 1 November 1944; air echelon detached 12 September 1944 – c. 18 February 1945)

Vietnam War

- 553rd Reconnaissance Squadron: 25 February 1967 – 15 December 1970
- 554th Reconnaissance Squadron: 25 February 1967 – 15 December 1970

Post consolidation

- 1st Special Operations Squadron: 6 April 1989 – present
- 17th Special Operations Squadron: 1 August 1989 – 6 July 2021
- 21st Special Operations Squadron: 1 July 2019 – present
- 31st Special Operations Squadron: 6 April 1989 – 31 August 2001
- 320th Special Tactics Squadron: 1 January 1993 – present
- 353rd Special Operations Maintenance Squadron (later 353rd Maintenance Squadron, 353rd Special Operations Maintenance Squadron): 1 October 1989 – present
- 353rd Special Operations Support Squadron (later 353rd Operations Support Squadron, 353rd Special Operations Support Squadron): 1 October 1992 – present
- 353rd Special Operations Aircraft Maintenance Squadron: unknown – present
- 753rd Special Operations Aircraft Maintenance Squadron: 1 July 2019 – present

=== Stations ===
- Drew Field, Florida, 1 May 1944
- Lakeland Army Air Field, Florida, 5 May 1944
- Alachua Army Air Field, Florida, c. 20 August 1944
- Drew Field, Florida, 6–24 October 1944
- Mangaldan Airfield, Luzon, Philippines, December 1944
- Laoag Airfield, Luzon, Philippines, April 1945
- Ie Shima Airfield, Okinawa, August 1945

Squadrons operated from Atsugi Airfield, Japan, 20 September – 7 October 1945

- Chitose Air Base, Japan, C. 27 October 1945 – 25 March 1946
- Otis Air Force Base, Massachusetts, 25 February–October 1967
- Korat Royal Thai Air Force Base, Thailand, 31 October 1967 – 15 December 1970

Operated from U-Tapao Royal Thai Navy Airfield, Thailand, 30 January – 28 February 1969

- Clark Air Base, Philippines, 6 April 1989 (operated from Okinawa, after July 1991)
- Kadena Air Base, Japan, 5 February 1992 – present

=== Aircraft ===
- Curtiss P-40 Warhawk, 1944
- North American F-6 Mustang, 1944
- Douglas C-47 Skytrain, 1944–1945
- Waco CG-4, 1944
- North American P-51 Mustang, 1944, 1945–1946
- Stinson L-5 Sentinel, 1944, 1945
- Noorduyn UC-64 Norseman, 1944, 1945
- Lockheed EC-121 Warning Star, 1967–1970
- Beechcraft YQU-22 Pave Eagle, 1968–1969
- Beechcraft QU-22 Pave Eagle, 1970
- Lockheed MC-130E Combat Talon/H, 1989–2012
- Lockheed MC-130H Combat Talon II, 1989-2020
- Lockheed HC (later MC)-130P, 1989–2014
- Lockheed HC-130N Combat King, 1989–2014
- Lockheed MC-130J Commando II, 2014–present
- Lockheed C-130E Hercules, 1989– ?
- Sikorsky HH-53 Super Jolly Green Giant, 1989–1990
- Sikorsky MH-53 Pave Low, 1990–2001

== Awards ==
Award streamer	Award	Dates	Notes
	Air Force Meritorious Unit Award	1 October 2010 – 30 September 2012	353rd Special Operations Group
	Air Force Outstanding Unit Award with "V" Device	1 April 1967 – 31 May 1968	553rd Reconnaissance Wing
	Air Force Outstanding Unit Award with "V" Device	1 July 1968 – 15 April 1969	553rd Reconnaissance Wing
	Air Force Outstanding Unit Award with "V" Device	2 September 2004 – 1 September 2006	353rd Special Operations Group
	Air Force Outstanding Unit Award with "V" Device	1 October 2006 – 30 September 2008	353rd Special Operations Group
	Air Force Outstanding Unit Award	6 April 1989 – 5 April 1991	353rd Special Operations Wing
	Air Force Outstanding Unit Award	1 June 1993 – 31 May 1995	353rd Special Operations Group
	Air Force Outstanding Unit Award	1 September 1995 – 31 August 1997	353rd Special Operations Group
	Air Force Outstanding Unit Award	16 October 1998 – 31 May 2000	353rd Special Operations Group
	Air Force Outstanding Unit Award	13 October 2000 – 1 September 2002	353rd Special Operations Group
	Air Force Outstanding Unit Award	2 September 2002 – 1 September 2004	353rd Special Operations Group
	Philippine Republic Presidential Unit Citation	17 October 1944 – 4 July 1945	3rd Air Commando Group
	Republic of Vietnam Gallantry Cross with Palm	1 April 1967 – 15 December 1970	553rd Reconnaissance Wing
	Philippine Republic Presidential Unit Citation	31 January 2002 – 31 July 2002	353rd Special Operations Group
