= Berlin Airlift Device =

Miniature gold airplane awarded for wear

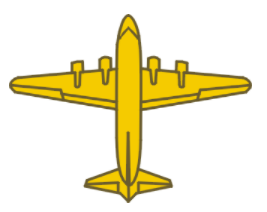
- Type: Ribbon Device
- Awarded for: Service during Berlin Airlift
- Sponsored by: United States Army
- Status: Not Currently Awarded
- Established: 1948

The Berlin Airlift Device is a miniature gold C-54 type aircraft that was awarded for wear on occupation medals and ribbons issued to United States Armed Forces service personnel for participation in or in direct support of the Berlin airlift during the Cold War.

== History ==
The Berlin Airlift Device was awarded for service of 92 consecutive days with a unit credited with participation in the Berlin Airlift, or by competent field authority on an individual basis within the period June 26, 1948 to September 30, 1949 inclusive. U.S. Army orders announcing award of the Berlin Airlift device specifically awarded the Army of Occupation Medal to persons otherwise not eligible therefor. The device is a gold-colored metal miniature of a Douglas C-54 cargo airplane. It is worn centered at a 30-degree angle, to the wearer’s right, on the suspension and service ribbon of the Army of Occupation Medal or Navy Occupation Service Medal. When worn on the suspension ribbon, the device is pinned above the Germany medal clasp.

Army of Occupation Ribbon or Navy Occupation Service Ribbon with Berlin Airlift Device

Those awarded the Army of Occupation Medal or Navy Occupation Service Medal and the Berlin Airlift Device may also be entitled to the Medal for Humane Action awarded for at least 120 days of service or direct support of the Berlin airlift. The 31 American service personnel and one Army civilian worker of the 101 persons who lost their lives mostly due to plane crashes during the Berlin Airlift were awarded the Medal of Humane Action posthumously.

== See also ==
- United States military award devices
- Awards and decorations of the United States military
- Berlin Airlift Historical Foundation
- DA Pamphlet 672-1, page 533 for the list of Army units entitled to the Berlin Airlift Device
