= Medal for Humane Action =

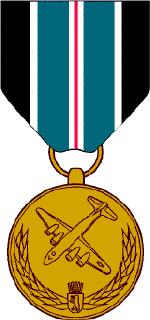
- Obverse
- Type: Military medal Service medal
- Awarded for: "To commemorate military service in direct support of the Berlin Airlift"
- Presented by: Department of Defense
- Eligibility: Extended duty in support of the Berlin Airlift
- Status: Obsolete
- First award: June 26, 1948
- Final award: September 30, 1949
- Service ribbon

Precedence
- Next (higher): Navy: Navy Occupation Service Medal; Marine Corps: Navy Occupation Service Medal; Army: Army of Occupation Medal; Air Force: Army of Occupation Medal; Coast Guard: Navy Occupation Service Medal
- Next (lower): National Defense Service Medal
- Related: Berlin Airlift Device

The Medal for Humane Action was a military award of the United States Armed Forces which was created by an act (63 Stat. 477) of the United States Congress on July 20, 1949. The medal recognizes those military service members who performed extended duty in support of the Berlin Airlift. The medal is based on the design of the Berlin Airlift Device.

== Criteria ==
This medal was created for the single purpose of recognizing service during a single action (the Berlin Airlift) and was never issued again. The specific criteria for receipt of this award was established by Executive Order 10325, "Regulations governing the award of the Medal for Humane Action," of February 7, 1952. To be awarded the Medal for Humane Action a service member was required to have performed over 120 days of duty, within the geographical boundary of Berlin, with such duty being in support of the Berlin Airlift between June 26, 1948 and September 30, 1949. Posthumous award may be made to any person who lost his life while, or as a direct result of, participating in the Berlin airlift, without regard to the length of such service, if otherwise eligible. Those so qualifying were also eligible for either the Army of Occupation Medal, or the Navy Occupation Service Medal, respectively with the Berlin Airlift Device, and both medals were authorized for simultaneous award and display.

== Description ==
The medal was designed by Thomas Hudson Jones of the Army Heraldic Section and is made of bronze and round, 1.25 inches (32 mm) in diameter. It depicts a Douglas C-54 Skymaster over a wheat wreath. At the center of the wreath is the Coat of arms of Berlin. The reverse bears the eagle, shield, and arrows from the seal of the Department of Defense and reads "For Humane Action / To Supply Necessities of Life to the People of Berlin Germany". The medal is suspended by a ribbon primarily of teal blue with black edges separated by thin white stripes. In the center is a red stripe with thin white stripes separating it from the teal.
