= Army of Occupation Medal =

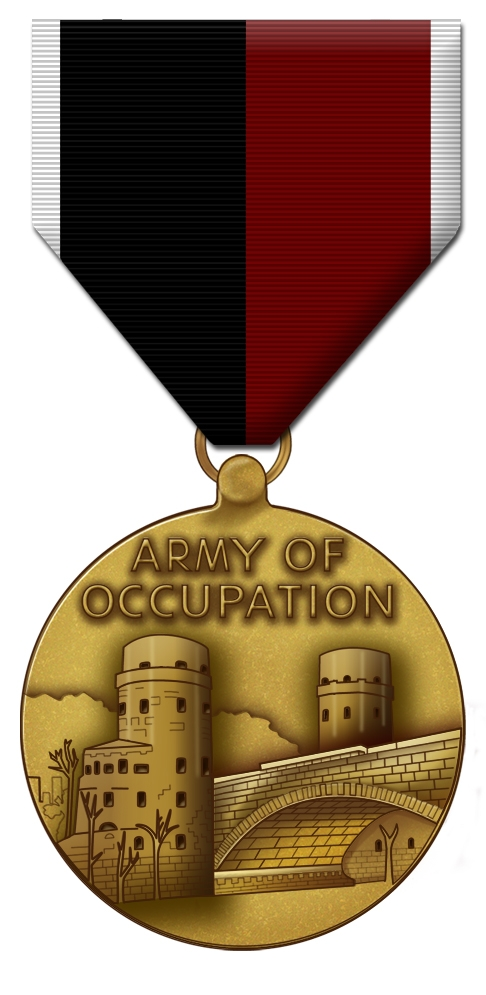
- Obverse
- Type: Military medal Service medal
- Awarded for: 30 or more consecutive days of duty in one of the occupied territories after World War II.
- Presented by: Department of War (later Department of the Army and Department of the Air Force)
- Eligibility: Personnel of the United States Army and United States Air Force
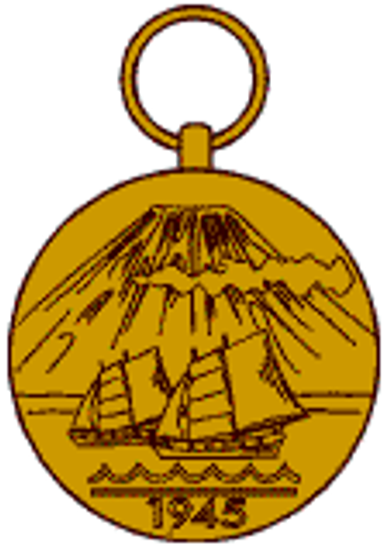
- Reverse
- Clasps: Germany; Japan
- Status: Inactive
- Established: 5 April 1946
- First award: 2 April 1947
- Final award: 2 October 1990
- Service ribbon and campaign streamer

Precedence
- Next (higher): World War II Victory Medal
- Equivalent: Navy Occupation Service Medal
- Next (lower): National Defense Service Medal

The Army of Occupation Medal was a military award of the United States military which was established by the United States War Department on 5 April 1946. The medal was created in the aftermath of the Second World War to recognize those who had performed occupation service in either Germany, Italy, Austria, Japan or Korea. The original Army of Occupation Medal was intended only for members of the United States Army, but was expanded in 1948 to encompass the United States Air Force shortly after that service's creation. The Navy and Marine equivalent of the Army of Occupation Medal is the Navy Occupation Service Medal, which features the same ribbon with its own medallion and clasps.

== History ==
Although authorized in 1946, it was not until 1947 that the first Army of Occupation Medals were distributed. The first medal was presented to General of the Army Dwight D. Eisenhower, who had been the Supreme Headquarters Allied Expeditionary Force Commander during World War II.

Because of the legal status of West Berlin as an occupied territory, the Army of Occupation Medal was issued for forty-five years until the unification of Germany in 1990, making it one of the longest active military awards of both the Second World War and the Cold War.

In addition, some recipients of the award were born two generations after the end of the conflict which the medal was designed to represent. Much like the National Defense Service Medal, the Army of Occupation Medal has come to be considered a "multi-generational" award.

Although 30 days in West Berlin was a requirement for issuing the award, it was not unusual for supply sergeants to issue it along with other unit insignia and equipment. If the soldier questioned it, he would be told "You aren't going anywhere for 30 days! Just wait to put it on your uniform."

== Criteria ==
To be awarded the Army of Occupation Medal, a service member was required to have performed at least thirty consecutive days of military duty within a designated geographical area of military occupation. The Army of Occupation Medal was presented with a campaign clasp, denoting either European or Asian service, depending on the region in which occupation service had been performed. Campaign clasps were worn on the full-sized medal only with no corresponding device when wearing the Army of Occupation Medal as a ribbon on a military uniform.

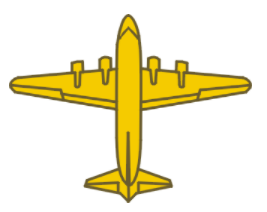

In addition to the Germany clasp, for those service members who performed 92 consecutive days of military duty during the Berlin Airlift in 1948 and 1949, the Berlin Airlift Device is authorized as a device to the Army of Occupation Medal. (If further eligible, persons could also be awarded the Medal for Humane Action.)

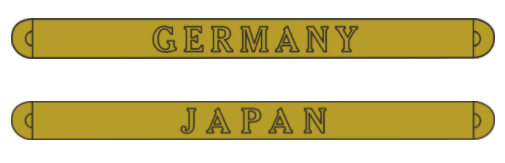

=== Germany clasp ===
- Germany (9 May 1945 to 5 May 1955)
- Austria (9 May 1945 to 27 July 1955)
- Italy (9 May 1945 to 15 September 1947)
- West Berlin (9 May 1945 to 2 October 1990)

=== Japan clasp ===
- Japan (3 September 1945 to 27 April 1952)
- Korea (3 September 1945 to 29 June 1949)

== Appearance ==
The medal is bronze measuring 1.25 inches across. On the obverse, are the abutments of the Remagen Bridge with the words "ARMY OF OCCUPATION" inscribed above. On the reverse, is Mount Fuji with a low-hanging cloud over two Japanese junks above a wave and the inscribed date "1945". A bronze clasp 0.125 inches wide and 1.5 inches in length with the word "GERMANY" or "JAPAN" is worn on the suspension ribbon of the medal to indicate service in Europe or the Far East. The ribbon is 1.375 inches wide with two thin white stripes at the edges and two thicker stripes in the middle, the first being black and the second in scarlet. A myth was that if a soldier served in Germany the ribbon's black band was worn to his right and if in Japan the red was to his right. The only approved display was for the black band to be to the wearer's right.
