= Mangaldan Airfield =

World War II airfield in Pangasinan, Philippines

Mangaldan Airfield
- Part of Fifth Air Force
- Located on Luzon, Philippines

Site information
- Type: Military airfield
- Controlled by: United States Army Air Forces

Location
- Mangaldan Airfield (Philippines)
- Coordinates: 16°04′00.62″N 120°24′03.67″E

Site history
- Built: 1945
- In use: 1945

Mangaldan Airfield is a World War II airfield located north of the town of Mangaldan, near Lingayen Gulf, to the east of Dagupan in the province of Pangasinan on the island of Luzon in the Philippines. It was abandoned after the war.

== History ==
The airfield was built after the American liberation in early January 1945 and was used as a medium bomber and fighter airfield during the 1945 Battle of the Philippines.

Mangaldan airfield was abandoned after the war and fell into a state of disuse. The town of Mangaldan has absorbed traces of the airbase, the runway area has reverted to rice paddy planting area and irrigated pools for fish farms and open space. In past decades farmers reported finding bullets and other remains, but not many traces of the airbase remain today.

=== Units assigned ===
- 35th Fighter Group (20 January – 10 April 1945)
- 58th Fighter Group (5–18 April 1945)
- 312th Bombardment Group (10 February – 19 April 1945)
- 1st Marine Aircraft Wing
  - Marine Aircraft Group - 24
  - Marine Aircraft Group - 32

== See also ==
- USAAF in the Southwest Pacific
- Louis Edward Curdes
