= 35th Fighter Squadron =

United States Air Force combat squadron

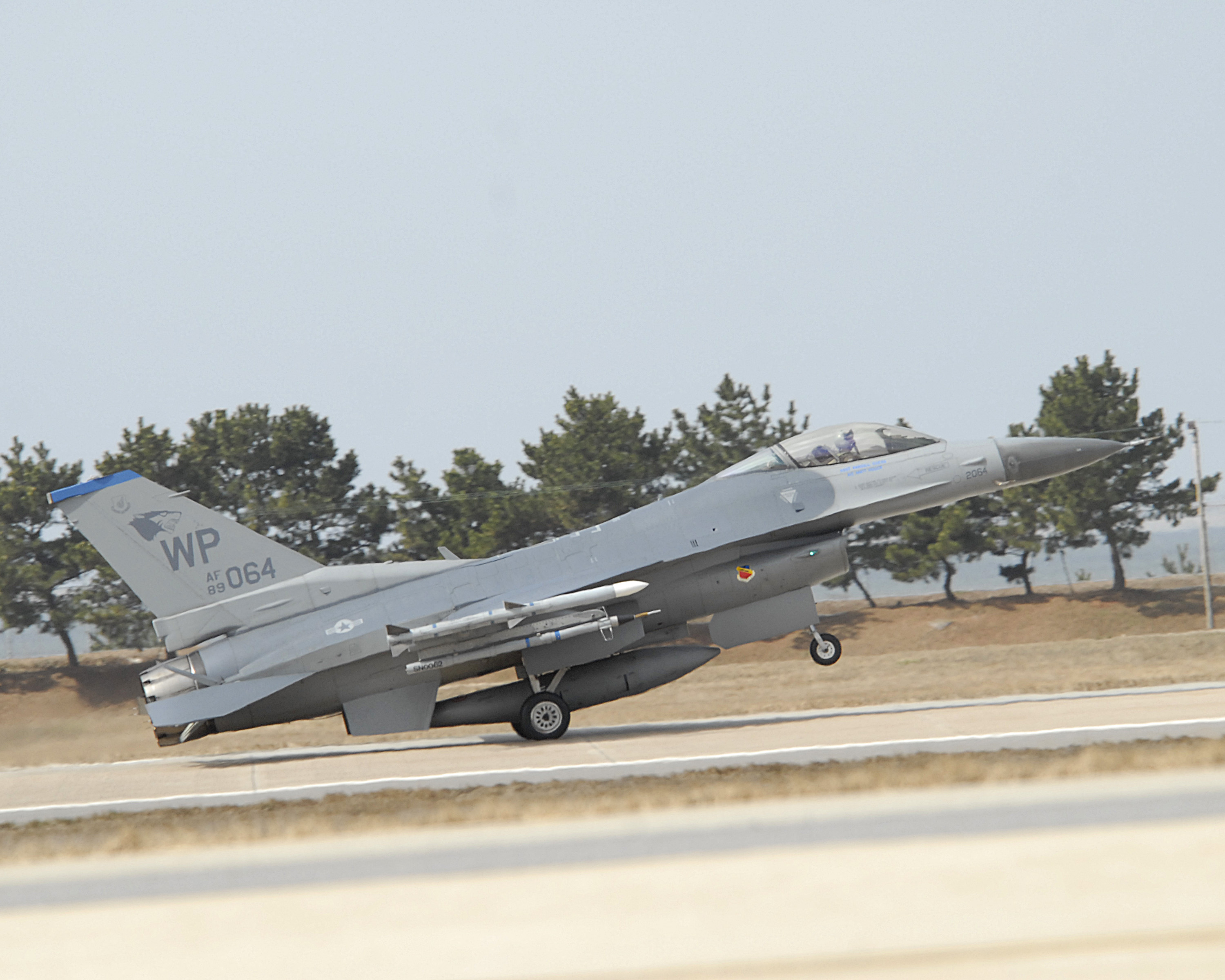
- 35th Fighter Squadron F-16C Fighting Falcon lands at Kunsan AB (Note: Aircraft is General Dynamics F-16C Block 40 serial 89-2064, taken on 16 March 2010.)
- Active: 1917–1919; 1932–present
- Country: United States
- Branch: United States Air Force
- Role: Fighter
- Part of: Pacific Air Forces
- Nicknames: Pantons; Cyclone's Flying Circus
- Motto: First to Fight
- Colors: Blue (25 January 1980 – present>
- Mascot: Bill! The Cat
- Engagements: World War I Southwest Pacific Theater; Korean War; Vietnam War
- Decorations: Distinguished Unit Citation; Air Force Outstanding Unit Award; Philippine Presidential Unit Citation; Republic of Korea Presidential Unit Citation; Republic of Vietnam Gallantry Cross with Palm

Commanders
- Current commander: Lt. Col. Christopher E. High
- Notable commanders: Glenn O. Barcus Maj. Emmett "Cyclone" Davis; Maj. Robert R. Scott

Insignia
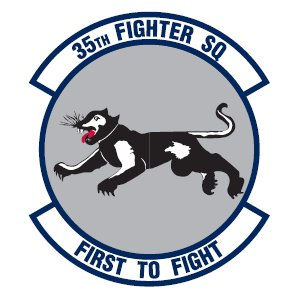
- 35th Fighter Squadron emblem (approved 7 November 1932)

The 35th Fighter Squadron is a United States Air Force unit, assigned to the 8th Operations Group, stationed at Kunsan Air Base, South Korea. The squadron operates the General Dynamics F-16 Fighting Falcon aircraft conducting air superiority missions.

The 35th FS is one of two squadrons of Block 40 F-16C/Ds at Kunsan, flying the Fighting Falcon since 1981. The 35th is one of the oldest squadrons in the United States Air Force, its history dating to 12 June 1917, when the unit was activated as the 35th Aero Squadron.

== History ==
=== World War I ===
The 35th Aero Squadron was a significant unit of the United States during World War I, rather than the 35th Fighter Squadron referred to previously. It was formed on June 12, 1917, and was initially involved in construction duties, repairing war-damaged French villages, and working in salvage yards in France. The 35th Aero Squadron was moved to several different French aerodromes throughout 1917 and 1918, where they served in various non-combat capacities, such as assembling aircraft, maintaining vehicles, and ferrying pilots. After the end of WWI, the 35th was demobilized in 1919 without seeing any combat action but made significant contributions to the war effort in a supportive capacity.

=== Inter-war years ===
The 35th Fighter Squadron was constituted as the 35th Pursuit Squadron (Interceptor) on 22 December 1939 It was activated on 1 February 1940 at Moffett Field, California, where it was assigned to the 8th Pursuit Group. Initially, the squadron trained new pilots and conceded their personnel to other units.

In 1941, the 35th Pursuit Squadron moved to Hamilton Field, California. Here they transitioned to aircraft like the Lockheed P-38 Lightning and the Bell P-39 Airacobra, in anticipation of potential involvement in World War II. Their duties involved coastal defense and training, ensuring a state of readiness for the upcoming conflict.

=== World War II ===
The 35th Fighter Squadron along with the 8th Pursuit Group and 22nd Airbase Group left San Francisco in Convoy Number 2033, escorted by USS New Orleans, for Australia on 12 February 1942 on the Army transport USAT Maui arriving with the convoy at Brisbane, Australia on 5 March 1942. The squadron has never been stationed in the United States since. It arrived in Brisbane, Queensland on 6 March 1942. After arrival, it moved to Amberley Airfield, west of Brisbane, where it was equipped with Bell P-39D Airacobras that were originally intended to go to the Philippines but the convoy carrying them was diverted to Brisbane.

They then moved to Woodstock Airport, Queensland outside of Townsville in northern Queensland on 26 April 1942 on their way to Port Moresby, New Guinea where they arrived on 30 April 1942. There, the squadron operated from a gravel fighter strip constructed by the Australians in the 1930s called Kila Kila Airfield (3 Mile Drome). After two months in combat, the squadron rotated back to Australia, returning to Woodstock on 29 June 1942 for various rest and re-equipment tasks. They relocated to Garbutt Field in Townsville on 27 July 1942 and then moved to Milne Bay in New Guinea on 18 September 1942 after the airfield was secured from the Japanese. It again engaged in combat operations against Japanese forces with its P-39s until rotated back to Queensland, being sent to Mareeba Airfield in February 1943 as its Airacobras were basically worn-out. At Mareeba, the squadron was re-equipped with Curtiss P-40N Warhawks before leaving Australia for good in May and heading back to Port Moresby.

In New Guinea, the squadron covered landings and supported offensive ground operations in New Britain, New Guinea, and Hollandia, with the group moving forward to different bases as territory was captured from the Japanese. At Cape Gloucester, the P-40s were replaced by Lockheed P-38F Lightnings that were ferried up from Australia. It was with the P-38 that the 8th Fighter Group became truly effective both against the Japanese Zero in air-to-air battles, as well as providing ground support to MacArthur's ground forces. Its twin engines offered an additional safety factory when operating over long stretches of water and jungle. The Lightnings proved to be extremely rugged and could take a lot of battle damage and still keep flying. Missions lasting 9, 10, or even 12 hours became routine, and many wounded Lightnings were able to limp home on only one engine.

In 1944, the 35th supported operations in the Philippines, earning a second Distinguished Unit Citation when, armed only with machine guns, the Lightnings of the 8th Fighter Group strafed a Japanese naval task force for three hours, halting the ships until North American B-25 Mitchell medium bombers from more distant bases could attack the task force with low-level bomb runs Despite the fact that the group did not have time to load bombs on its fighters and used only .50 caliber bullets on the mission, the 8th managed to sink one of the Japanese ships.

After moving to San Jose, Occidental Mindoro in the Philippines in December 1944, the 35th spent the next several months conducting offensive operations against Formosa and the Asian mainland, as well as flying escort missions in the area. Moving to Ie Shima Airfield in August 1945, the 8th flew several missions against the Japanese island of Kyushu before the war ended.

On 14 August 1945, the day of the Japanese surrender, the 35th Fighter Squadron shot down the last enemy plane of the war. During its involvement in World War II, the 35th participated in nine campaigns.

=== Korean War ===
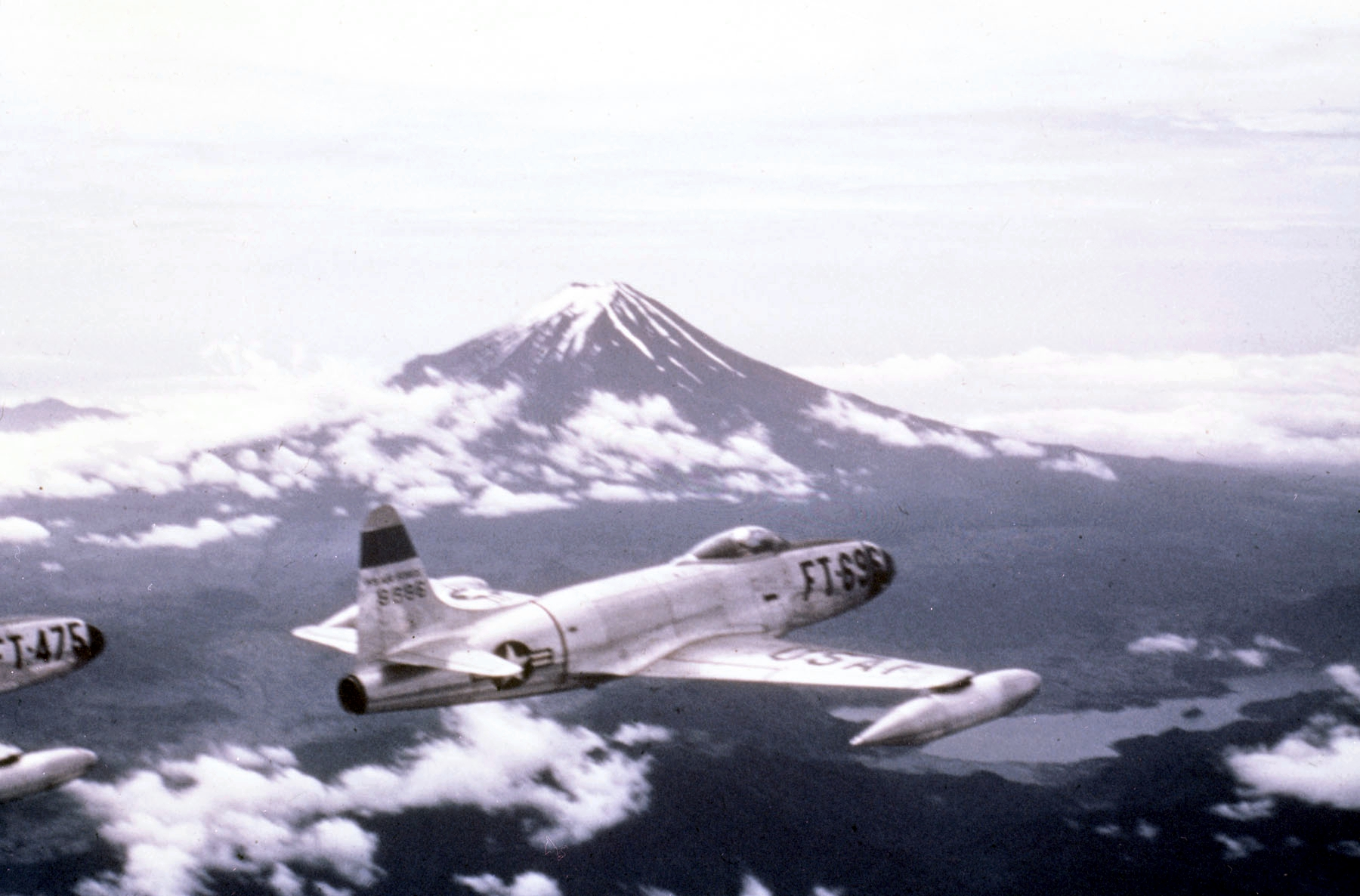
Lockheed F-80 near Mount Fuji in 1950 (Note: Aircraft is Lockheed F-80C serial 49-696. This aircraft is in the National Museum of the United States Air Force at Wright-Patterson AFB, Ohio.)

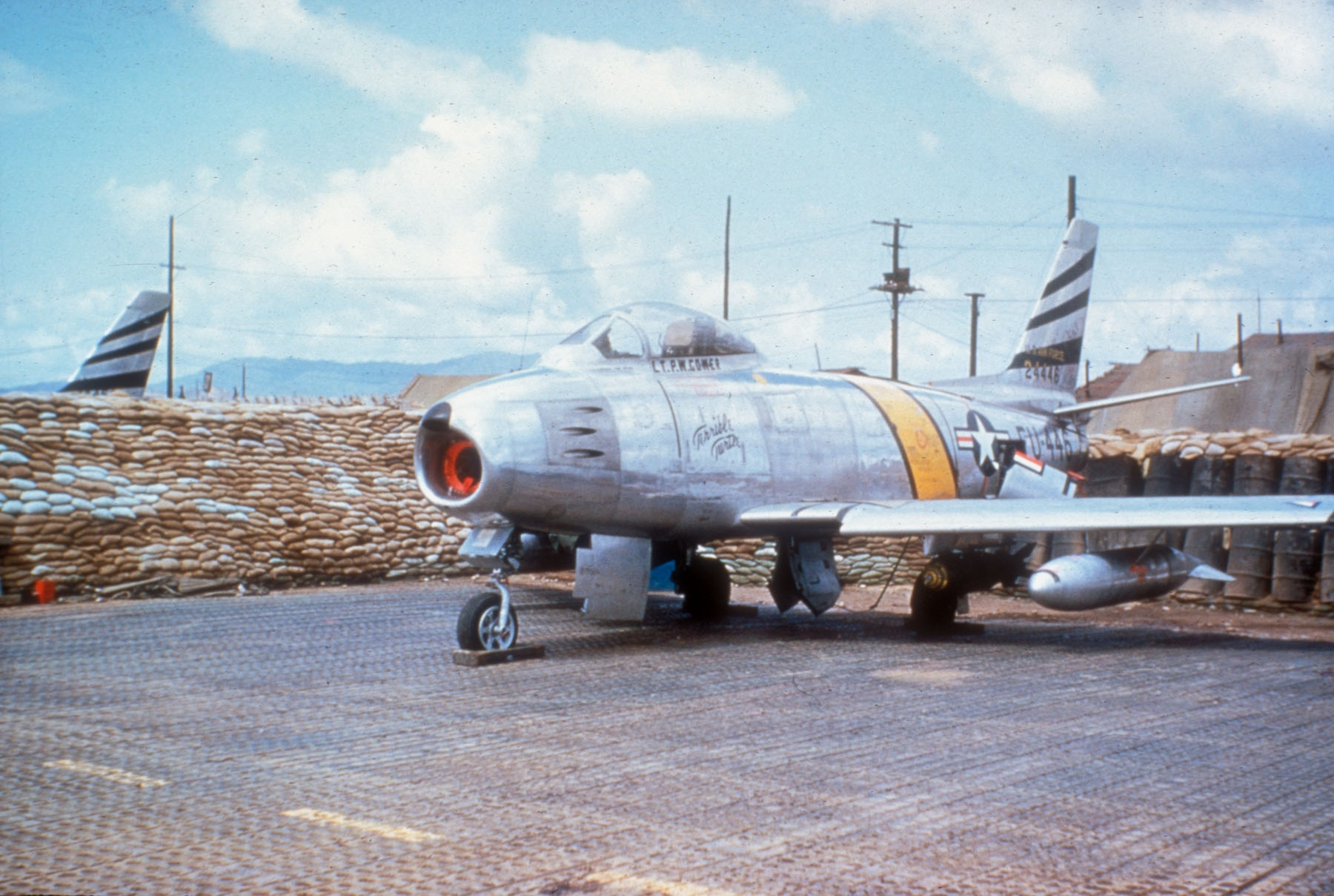
A 35th FBS F-86 Sabre in Korea, 1953

"When the Korean War began, the redesignated 35th Fighter-Bomber Squadron entered combat. Once on the offensive, the 35th moved from base to base in Korea, flying the Lockheed F-80 Shooting Star and later the North American F-86 Sabre. At one time, the 35th was stationed at Pyongyang, now the capital of North Korea."

=== Pacific Air Forces service ===
When the Korean War ended, the squadron started flying North American F-100 Super Sabres at its new location at Itazuke Air Base, Japan. In 1963, the squadron received Republic F-105 Thunderchiefs to replace the F-100s and moved to Yokota Air Base, Japan.

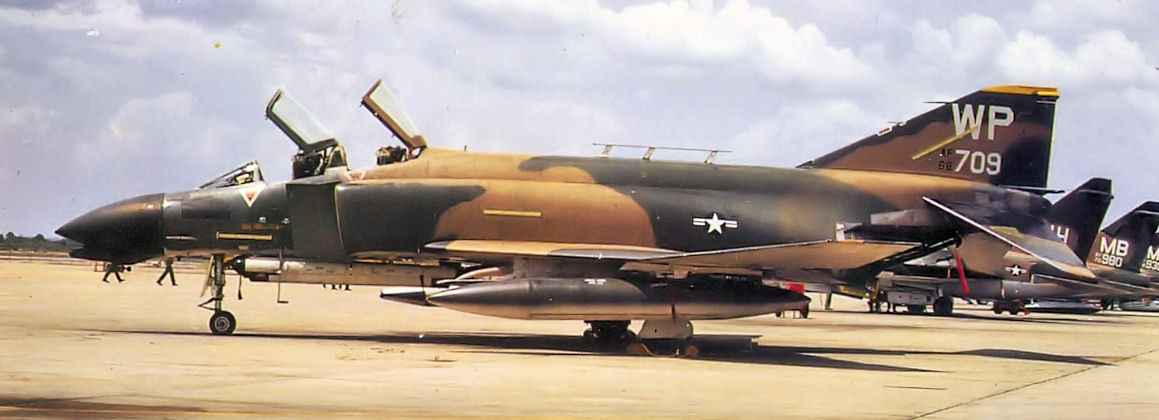
35th Tactical Fighter Squadron F-4D Phantom (Note: Aircraft is McDonnell F-4D Phantom II serial 66-8709 at Korat RTAFB, Thailand in 1973.)

In 1964, the 35th deployed to Korat Royal Thai Air Force Base, Thailand, as one of the first units to fight in Southeast Asia. It later moved to Takhli Royal Thai Air Force Base, Thailand. The squadron also performed numerous deployments to Osan Air Base, Korea.

On 15 March 1972, the 35th moved to Kunsan Air Base to fly the McDonnell F-4 Phantom II. In September 1981, the 35th and its sister squadron, the 80th Tactical Fighter Squadron, became the first overseas units to convert to the General Dynamics F-16 Fighting Falcon. The squadrons and wing dropped the 'tactical' designation from their titles during an Air Force-wide reorganization on 31 January 1992.

On 17 November 2000, the 35th Fighter Squadron received its first Block 40 F-16s. The new aircraft carry Low-Altitude Navigation and Targeting Infrared for Night, or LANTIRN, pods. The 35th completed the conversion in February 2001.

== Lineage ==
- Organized as the 35th Aero Squadron on 12 June 1917

Demobilized on 19 March 1919

- Reconstituted and redesignated 35th Pursuit Squadron on 24 March 1923

Activated on 25 June 1932
Redesignated 35th Pursuit Squadron (Fighter) on 6 December 1939
Redesignated 35th Pursuit Squadron (Interceptor) on 12 March 1941
Redesignated 35th Fighter Squadron on 15 May 1942
Redesignated 35th Fighter Squadron, Two Engine on 19 February 1944
Redesignated 35th Fighter Squadron, Single Engine on 8 January 1946
Redesignated 35th Fighter Squadron, Jet on 1 January 1950
Redesignated 35th Fighter-Bomber Squadron on 20 January 1950
Redesignated 35th Tactical Fighter Squadron on 1 July 1958
Redesignated 35th Fighter Squadron on 3 February 1992

=== Assignments ===
- Unknown 12 June 1917
- Third Aviation Instruction Center, November 1917
- Unknown, January 1919 – 19 Mar 1919
- 8th Pursuit Group (later 8th Fighter Group, 8th Fighter-Bomber Group), 25 June 1932 (attached to 8th Fighter-Bomber Wing after 1 February 1957)
- 8th Fighter-Bomber Wing (later 8th Tactical Fighter) Wing, 1 October 1957 (attached to 41st Air Division, after 13 May 1964)
- 41st Air Division, 18 June 1964 (attached to 2d Air Division, 24 September – 20 November 1964)
- 6441st Tactical Fighter Wing, 1 April 1965 (attached to 2d Air Division, 4 May – 26 June 1965 and 19 October – 15 November 1965)
- 41st Air Division, 15 November 1966
- 347th Tactical Fighter Wing, 15 January 1968 (attached to Detachment 1, 347th Tactical Fighter Wing, 10 June – 16 July 1968, 22 August – 1 October 1968, 22 November – 26 December 1968, 21 March – 23 April 1969, 30 June – 6 August 1969, 17 October – 29 November 1969, 30 January – 7 March 1970, 8–30 May 1970, 11 July – 8 August 1970, 2–30 October 1970, and 26 December 1970 – 23 January 1971)
- 3d Tactical Fighter Wing, 15 March 1971 (attached to 366th Tactical Fighter Wing, 3 April – 12 June 1972; 388th Tactical Fighter Wing, 12 June–c. 12 October 1972)
- 8th Tactical Fighter Wing (later 8th Fighter Wing), 16 September 1974
- 8th Operations Group, 3 February 1992 – present

=== Stations ===
- Camp Kelly (later Kelly Field), Texas, 12 June – 11 August 1917
- Étampes, France, 20 September 1917
- Paris, France, 23 September 1917
- Issoudun Aerodrome, France, November 1917
- Clisson, France, 4 January 1919
- Saint-Nazaire, France, 9–20 February 1919
- Garden City, New York, 9–19 March 1919
- Langley Field, Virginia, 25 June 1932
- Mitchel Field, New York, 14 November 1940 – 26 January 1942
- Brisbane, Australia, 6 March 1942
- Port Moresby, New Guinea, 26 April 1942
- Woodstock Airport, Australia, 29 June 1942
- Townsville, Australia, 27 July 1942
- Milne Bay, New Guinea, 18 September 1942
- Mareeba Airfield, Australia, 24 February 1943
- Port Moresby, New Guinea, 10 May 1943
- Finschhafen Airport, New Guinea, 25 December 1943
- Cape Gloucester, New Britain, 19 February 1944
- Nadzab Airfield Complex, New Guinea, 14 March 1944
- Owi, Schouten Islands, 1 July 1944
- Morotai, Netherlands East Indies, 4 October 1944
- Dulag Airfield, Leyte, Philippines, 5 November 1944 (operated from Morotai until 28 November 1944)
- San Jose, Mindoro, Philippines, 20 December 1944
- Ie Shima Airfield, Ryuku Islands, 9 August 1945
- Fukuoka Airfield, Japan, c. 21 November 1945
- Ashiya Air Base, Japan, 20 May 1946
- Itazuke Air Base, Japan, 5 September 1946
- Ashiya Air Base, Japan, 15 April 1947
- Miho Air Base, Japan, 10 August 1948
- Itazuke Air Base, Japan, 16 June 1949
- Tsuiki Air Base, Japan, 11 August 1950
- Suwon Air Base, South Korea, 7 October 1950
- Kimpo Air Base, South Korea, 26 October 1950
- Pyongyang Air Base, North Korea, 25 November 1950
- Seoul Air Base, South Korea, 3 December 1950
- Itazuke Air Base, Japan, 10 December 1950
- Kimpo Air Base, South Korea, 25 June 1951
- Suwon Air Base, South Korea, 24 August 1951
- Itazuke Air Base, Japan, 20 October 1954
- Yokota Air Base, Japan, 13 May 1964 (deployed to Korat Royal Thai Air Force Base, Thailand, 24 September – 20 November 1964; Takhli Royal Thai Air Force Base, Thailand 4 May – 25 June 1965, 19 October – 15 November 1965; Osan Air Base, South Korea, 10 June – 16 July 1968, 22 August – 1 October 1968, 23 November – 26 December 1968, 21 March – 23 April 1969, 30 June – 6 August 1969, 17 October – 29 November 1969, 30 January – 7 March 1970, 8–30 May 1970, 11 July – 8 August 1970, 2–30 October 1970 and 26 December 1970 – 23 January 1971))
- Kunsan Air Base, South Korea, 15 March 1971 – present (deployed to Da Nang Air Base, South Vietnam, 3 April – 12 June 1972; Korat Royal Thai Air Force Base, Thailand 13 June-c. 12 October 1972)

=== Aircraft ===
- Boeing P-12 (1932–1936)
- Curtiss P-6 Hawk (1933–1936)
- Consolidated P-30 (1936–1939)
- Curtiss YP-37 (1938–1940)
- Northrop A-17 Nomad (1938–1940)
- Curtiss P-40 Warhawk (1940–1941, 1943–1944)
- Bell P-39 Airacobra (1941–1943)
- Bell P-400 Airacobra I (1942–1943)
- Lockheed P-38 Lightning (1944–1946)
- North American P-51 Mustang (1946–1950)
- Lockheed F-80 Shooting Star (1949–1953)
- North American F-86 Sabre (1953–1957)
- North American F-100 Super Sabre (1956–1963)
- Republic F-105 Thunderchief (1963–1967)
- McDonnell F-4 Phantom II (1964–1981)
- General Dynamics F-16 Fighting Falcon (1981 – present)

== See also ==
- List of American aero squadrons
