= Edward Cragg (pilot) =

American World War II flying ace

Edward Cragg Jr.
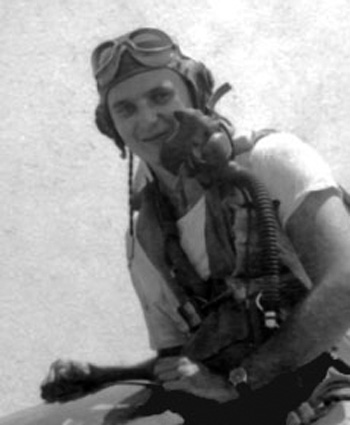
- Born: September 8, 1919; Mount Vernon, New York, US
- Military career
- Allegiance: United States
- Branch: United States Army Air Forces
- Service years: 1940–1943
- Rank: Major
- Nicknames: Ed; Porky
- Unit: 8th Fighter Group
- Commands: 80th Fighter Squadron
- Conflicts: World War II
- Awards: Distinguished Service Cross; Silver Star; Distinguished Flying Cross (5); Purple Heart (2); Air Medal (7)
- Disappeared: December 26, 1943 (aged 24); MIA near Cape Gloucester, New Britain
- Status: Declared dead in absentia January 16, 1946 (aged 26)

Edward "Porky" Cragg (September 8, 1919 – missing in action December 26, 1943 – finding of death January 16, 1946) was a triple ace (15 Aerial Victories) and a major in the United States Army Air Forces.

== Biography ==
=== Early life ===
Edward Cragg was born at Mount Vernon, New York, on September 8, 1919. He spent his youth in the Greenwich / Cos Cob area of Connecticut, graduating from Greenwich High School in the class of 1936. In September 1937, he enrolled in the School of Commerce, Accounts and Finance at New York University, New York. He was working towards a Bachelor of Science degree in accounting. In September 1940, he withdrew from the university to enlist.

=== World War II ===
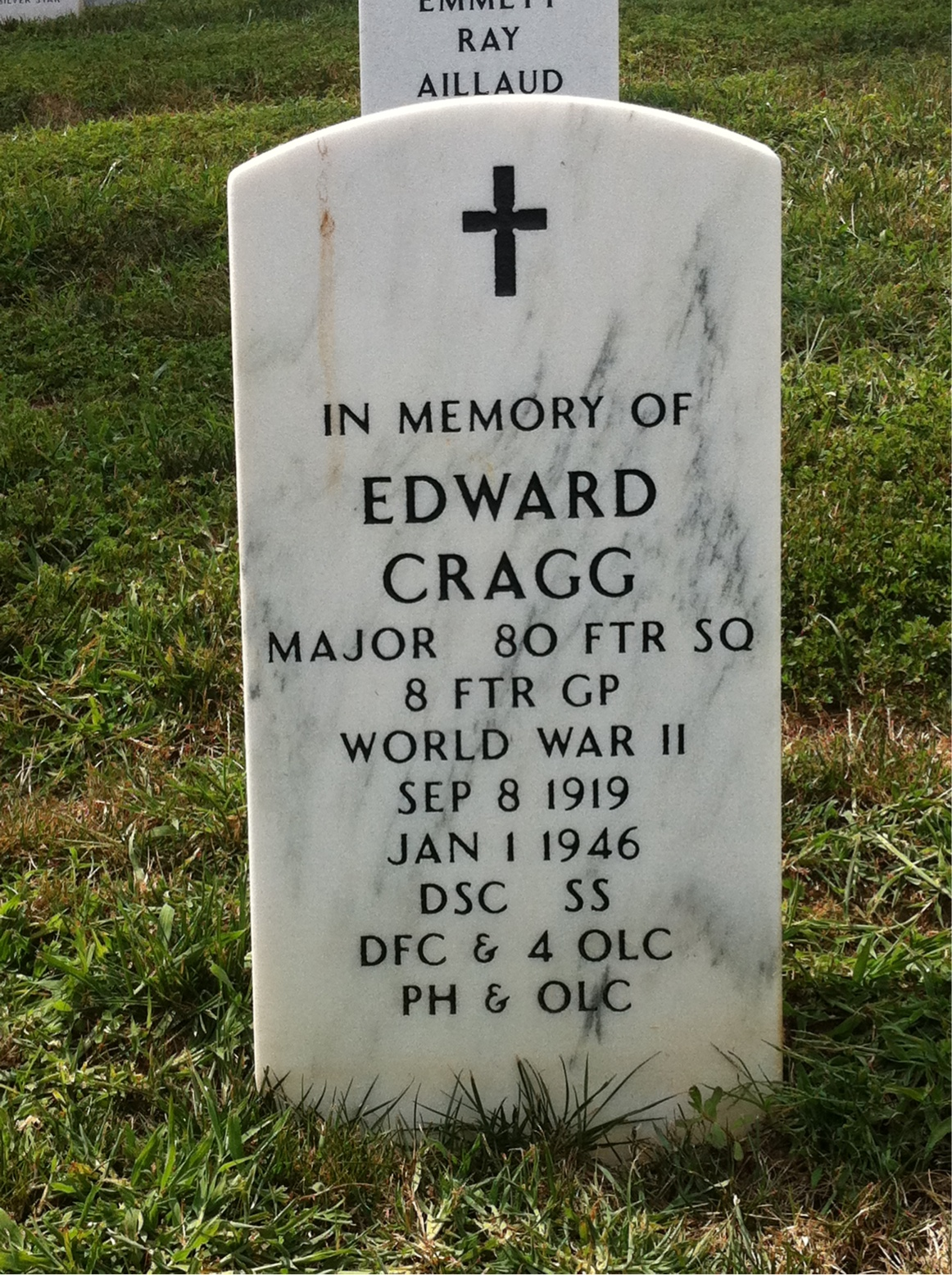
Marker at Arlington National Cemetery

He enlisted as a flying cadet on November 30, 1940. He received his elementary training at Albany, Georgia, his basic training at Gunter Field, Alabama, from February to April 1941, and his advanced flying training at the Air Corps Advanced Flying School, Craig Field, Selma, Alabama. He was appointed a second lieutenant, Air Reserve, on July 11, 1941, and was ordered to active duty on the following day.

Upon graduation from Advanced Flying School, he remained at the school until July 1941, when he was ordered to the Panama Canal Zone for duty as Assistant Squadron Engineering Officer. He later becoming Engineering Officer of the 28th Pursuit Squadron, 37th Pursuit Group, stationed at Albrook Field in the Panama Canal Zone. While there, he was promoted to first lieutenant on September 5, 1942.

In spring 1942, he was reassigned to what was then designated the 80th Pursuit Squadron, part of the 8th Pursuit Group, Fifth Air Force, in the Southwest Pacific theater. Both the squadron and group were soon redesignated from "Pursuit" to "Fighter". Initially, the squadron flew P-39 Airacobras. Cragg named his "Porky", and soon acquired the nickname of "Porky". He was promoted to captain on December 17, 1942

On April 8, 1943, he became the commander of the 80th. Among his first actions was naming the squadron "The Headhunters" after the local New Guinean headhunter tribes, who hated the Japanese and helped to rescue downed pilots. He also commissioned crew chief Yale Saffro, a former Walt Disney Studios artist, to design the 80th's patch, the likeness of the proud Papuan Chief of New Guinea. Squadron lore credits him with arranging the equipping of the squadron with the new P-38 Lightning aircraft. He named his "Porky II".

During his tenure with the squadron, he compiled an air-to-air combat record of 15 confirmed kills and 2 probable kills. He was promoted to major on July 6, 1943.

He served as commander of the Headhunters until he was reported missing in action over New Britain on December 26, 1943. During that final mission he shot down his final kill. He was succeeded in command of the Headhunters by fellow squadron member and ace Major Jay "Cock" Robbins.

== Aerial victory credits ==
Date	Location	Credits	Comment
May 21, 1943	In the vicinity of Salamaua, New Guinea	1 (Oscar)	.
July 21, 1943	Near Bogadjim, New Guinea	2 (Oscars)	Awarded 1st OLC to DFC
July 23, 1943	Over Bogadjim, New Guinea	2 (Oscar, Tony)	Awarded Silver Star, ace status
August 20, 1943	Near Wewak, New Guinea,	2 (Oscar, Tony)	Awarded 2nd OLC to DFC
August 21, 1943	Near Wewak, New Guinea	1 (Oscar)	Awarded DSC
September 4, 1943	Between Lae and Salamaua, New Guinea	2 (Zeros)	Awarded 3rd OLC to DFC
October 24, 1943	Over Rapopo Strip, Rabaul, New Britain	2 (Zeros)	Received Purple Heart
October 29, 1943	Over Vunakanau, New Guinea	1 (Zero)	.
December 22, 1943	Over Wewak, New Guinea	1 (Tony)	.
December 26, 1943	Over Borgen Bay, Cape Gloucester, western New Britain	1 (Zero)	Never Returned – Declared MIA. Posthumously awarded 4th OLC to DFC, 1st OLC to Purple Heart

== Decorations ==
His decorations include:

United States Army Air Forces pilot badge
Distinguished Service Cross	Silver Star	Distinguished Flying Cross with four bronze oak leaf clusters
Purple Heart with bronze oak leaf cluster	Air Medal with silver and bronze oak leaf clusters	American Defense Service Medal
American Campaign Medal	Asiatic-Pacific Campaign Medal with silver and bronze campaign stars	World War II Victory Medal

Army Presidential Unit Citation
with bronze oak leaf cluster

=== Distinguished Service Cross citation ===

Cragg, Edward
Major (Air Corps), U.S. Army Air Forces
80th Fighter Squadron, 8th Fighter Group, Fifth Air Force
Date of Action: August 21, 1943

Citation:

On 21 August 1943, while commanding the 80th Fighter Squadron near Wewak, New Guinea, Cragg escorted a bomber formation during an attack on an airfield. After additional Japanese fighters approached the bombers, he drew their attention away from the formation and then accompanied the bombers on their return flight. During the engagement, he was credited with shooting down one enemy aircraft and damaging another. He was awarded the Distinguished Service Cross for his actions during the mission.

== See also ==
- List of people who disappeared
