= Cyclone Davis =

Cyclone Davis may refer to:

- Emmett Smith "Cyclone" Davis (1918–2015), United States Air Force officer and pilot
- James "Cyclone" Davis (1853–1940), American politician

== See also ==
- Storm Davis (born 1961), American baseball player
