= Utah Aviation Hall of Fame =

The Utah Aviation Hall of Fame was established in 1996 to honor and recognize individuals in the State of Utah who have contributed significantly to Utah aviation. These people have distinguished themselves through major contributions in advancing aviation or heroic accomplishments as civil or military aviators in and for the State of Utah.

It is the greater goal of this program is to foster public appreciation for the contributions of these individuals to the education of air power. Specifically, the continuing education and development of civil or general, commercial, and military aviation throughout the State.

The official recognition of the Utah Aviation Hall of Fame was proclaimed by the governor in 1996. It Governor proclaimed the 32nd Flight (Pioneer), Order of Daedalians, the National Fraternity of Military Pilots, as the sponsor and custodial agency for the program. Honorees are inducted each year around Memorial Day.

The Utah Aviation Hall of Fame is located within the Hill Aerospace Museum, Hill AFB, UT (Interstate 15 Exit #338 / 5600 South Exit). Hours of operation are the same as those of the museum: 9 a.m. - 4:30 p.m. Tuesday through Saturday (closed Sundays and Mondays), closed December 24–25 for the Christmas Holiday and closed January 1 for New Years Day. Admission does not require entry onto Hill AFB and is free to the public.

== Laurates of the Hall ==
In 1996, the original eleven inductees for the Hall of Fame were so honored when the Hall was established at the Hill Aerospace Museum. The current administrator is Charles P. "Pat" Gilmore, major, USAFR (Retired)

=== Current inductees ===
1. Major General Orvil A. Anderson, USAF
2. Lieutenant Colonel Paul A. Bloomquist, AUS
3. General John Kenneth Cannon, USAF
4. Verenus "Vern" and Jessie Carter, Utah Aviation Pioneers
5. Brigadier General Darrell Stuart Cramer, USAF
6. Major General William E. Creer, USAF
7. Colonel Emmett Smith "Cyclone" Davis, USAF (2016)
8. Colonel Glenn Todd Eagleston, USAF
9. Captain Richard Taylor Eastmond, USN
10. Colonel Bernard F. Fisher, USAF
11. Jacob Edwin Garn, Utah Aeronautic Commission
12. Senator Jake Garn, BGEN Utah Air National Guard
13. Lieutenant Commander William Edward Hall, USNR
14. Colonel Gail Halvorsen, USAF
15. Robert H. Hinckley, Civil Aviation
16. Colonel Lorin Lavar Johnson, USAF
17. Lieutenant Colonel Clifford D. Jolley, USAF
18. Colonel Willard R. Macfarlane, USAF
19. Colonel Russell L. Maughan, USAF
20. Ardeth "Art" Mortensen, Civil Aviation
21. Alberta Hunt Nicholson, WASP
22. Lieutenant Colonel Chase J. Nielsen, USAF
23. Major General Chesley Gordon Peterson, USAF
24. Major Alden P. Rigby, USAF
25. Brigadier General Richard Condie Sanders, USAF
26. Colonel Walter T. Stewart, USAF
27. Harold A. Sweet, China National Aviation Corporation
28. Brigadier General Paul W. Tibbets, USAF
29. Lieutenant Wendell Van Twelves, USNR

== See also ==
- North American aviation halls of fame
- Early Birds of Aviation
- Hall of fame
- Timeline of aviation
- Wright brothers

== Sources ==
- Utah Aviation Hall of Fame (Aerospace Heritage Foundation of Utah website)
