= Kunsan Air Base =

Airbase in South Korea

- Gunsan, North Jeolla Province in South Korea
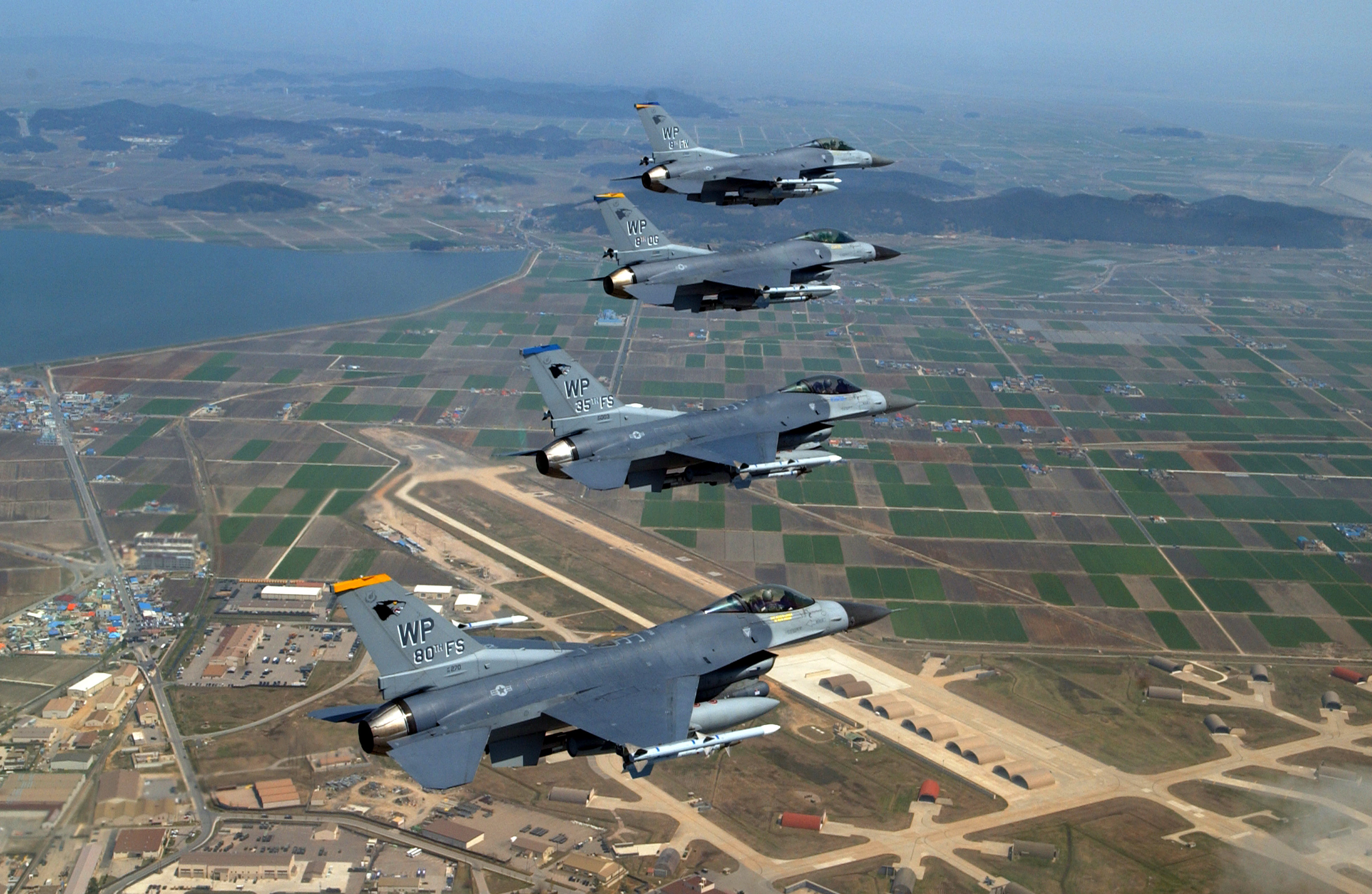
- F-16C Fighting Falcons of the 8th Fighter Wing flying over Kunsan Air Base.

Site information
- Type: US/ROK Air Force base
- Operator: US Air Force; Republic of Korea Air Force
- Controlled by: Pacific Air Forces (USAF); Air Combat Command (ROKAF)
- Condition: Operational
- Website: www.kunsan.af.mil

Location
- Location within South Korea Location within Asia Location within North Pacific
- Coordinates: 35°54′13″N 126°36′57″E

Site history
- Built: 1938
- In use: 1938 – present

Garrison information
- Current commander: Colonel Christopher B. Hammond
- Garrison: 8th Fighter Wing (USAF); 38th Fighter Wing (ROKAF))

Airfield information
- Identifiers: IATA: KUV, ICAO: RKJK, WMO: 471410
- Elevation: 9 metres (30 ft) AMSL
Runways
Direction	Length and surface
18/36	2,743 metres (8,999 ft)
- Airfield shared with Gunsan Airport; Source: DAFIF

Kunsan Air Base (K-8) (Korean: 군산공군기지) is a United States Air Force base located at Gunsan Airport, on the west coast of the Korean Peninsula bordered by the Yellow Sea. It is located in the town of Gunsan (also romanized as Kunsan), about 180 kilometres (110 mi) south of Seoul.

Kunsan Air Base is the home of the 8th Fighter Wing, "The Wolf Pack," assigned to the Pacific Air Forces Seventh Air Force and the 38th Fighter Group of the Republic of Korea Air Force. About 45 F-16 aircraft are stationed at the base. It is one of two major Air Force installations operated by the United States Forces Korea, the other being Osan Air Base.

== History ==
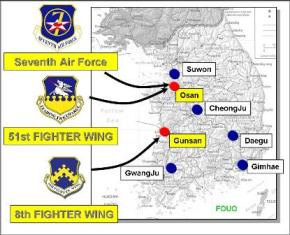
Seventh Air Force Bases

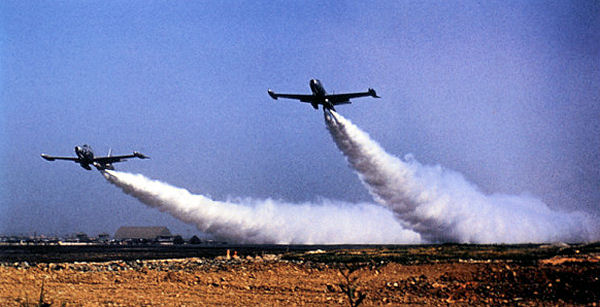
F-84Gs of the 522d Fighter-Escort Squadron (27th FEW). When flying from short runways the heavily loaded F-84s used Jet-Assisted Takeoff (JATO) bottles attached to the fuselage.

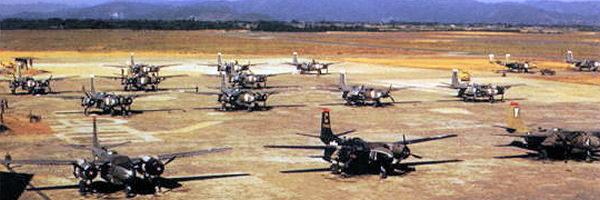
B-26Bs of the 3d Bomb Wing

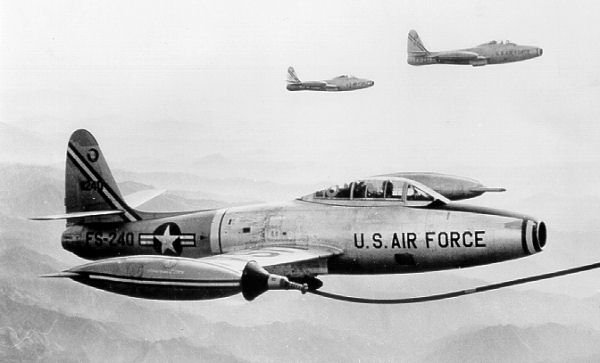
F-84G-25-RE Thunderjet AF Serial No. 52-3249 of the 49th Fighter-Bomber Wing being refuelled over Korea, 1953

The history of Kunsan Air Base dates back to 1938, when Japanese forces occupying Korea built a sod runway near Kunsan for fighter-interceptor aircraft.

The United States first used the base in 1945, but on a very small scale. From 1945 to 1950, the Army and later the Air Force intermittently operated small detachments from Kunsan, with these detachments maintaining liaison aircraft. At most these detachments contained a handful of people. When the United States pulled its combat units out of South Korea in 1949, it left only a Military Assistance Advisory Group in the country, and the periodic detachments at Kunsan became even more infrequent.

=== Korean War ===
When the Korean War broke out on 25 June 1950, Kunsan Air Base had no United States flying units assigned. In their rapid advance, the invading North Koreans captured Kunsan Air Base on 13 July 1950.

The 24th Infantry Division retook Kunsan in October 1950, and the Chinese intervention that winter failed to push far enough south to put Kunsan in jeopardy. United States forces first operated in significant numbers from the base in 1951.

The first USAF unit to be assigned to the base was the 27th Fighter-Escort Wing, which arrived on 1 April 1951. The 27th Fighter Escort Wing was one of the first F-84 Thunderjet units to see combat action in Korea and earned numerous honors and awards for their combat record during the Korean War.

Improvements to the base were needed, however, to accommodate jet fighters. The 27th FEW was reassigned at the end April and the 931st Engineer Aviation Group built a 5,000 feet (1,500 m) runway to replace the sod runway constructed by Japanese. Construction was slow due to the presence of groundwater and the site's proximity to the West Sea. The asphalt runway was completed in mid-July and known as Taxiway Charlie (06/24). By August, construction had progressed to the point that heavier units could be based at Kunsan and the USAF assigned the 3rd Bombardment Wing to Kunsan.

The 3rd Bomb Wing consisting of the 8th, 13th and 90th Bomb Squadrons flew the B-26 Invader bomber during the war, remaining at Kunsan from August 1951 until October 1954. A Marine night-fighter squadron, VMF(N)-513, arrived in April 1952. On 10 July 1952 the 474th Fighter-Bomber Group, which included three squadrons of F-84 fighters established its command post at Kunsan and began operations on 1 August. The 474th bombed and strafed such targets as bunkers, troops, artillery positions, bridges, vehicles, airfields, and power plants, and sometimes escorted bombers that attacked munitions factories and other objectives.

In April 1953, the 474th Fighter-Bomber Group returned to the United States and was replaced by the 49th Fighter-Bomber Wing, also flying the F-84.

In late 1953 a 9,000 feet (2,700 m) cement-concrete runway was completed at the base.

During the Korean War, the large number of locations used for bases and the similarity of some geographical names prompted the Air Force to use alphanumeric identifiers for bases in addition to their proper designations. Under this system, each base in Korea received a "K number," simplifying positive identification when referring to the various bases. Kunsan received the number K-8, while Osan Air Base was also known as K-55.

=== Cold War ===
After hostilities ceased, the base began to draw down. The F-84 forces of the 49th Fighter-Bomber Wing left in November 1953, and by October 1954, the host unit of the base, the 3d Bombardment Wing, also departed. This left the base with a much-reduced mission. From 1953 to 1954, the 808th and 841st Engineering Aviation Battalions constructed what is today's main runway. For the next several years Kunsan merely hosted periodic rotations of fighter and light bomber squadrons, with base facilities maintained and operated by an air base group. During 1957 and 1958 the base hosted squadrons from Japan temporarily. During 1957–1958, a Republic of Korea Air Force (ROKAF) F-86 Sabre crashed into the Yellow Sea south of the base after having a flame out and a USAF F-100 Super Sabre crashed in the rice paddies north of the base. The base remained a radar site as a backup during this time to Osan, until the radar site was turned over to the ROKAF in mid 1958. The Osan detachment on the base also maintained a radio relay site from a hill on the base. Then the base remained relatively dormant, hosting temporary deployments of flying units and serving as a safe haven base for aircraft evacuated from Okinawa and Guam during typhoons. In 1965, the ROKAF assigned a squadron of F-86 fighters to the base. This ROKAF unit was the only permanently assigned flying contingent at Kunsan until after the Pueblo incident in 1968.

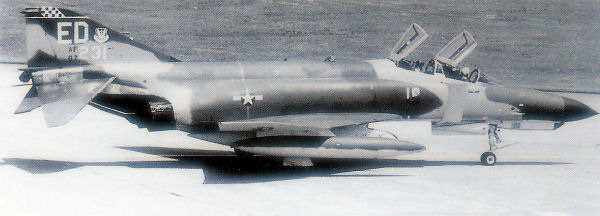
McDonnell Douglas F-4E-34-MC Phantom AF Serial No 67-0231 of the 16th Tactical Fighter Squadron on TDY from Eglin AFB Florida – Attached to 354th TFW at Kusan AB South Korea – April 1, 1970

At an unknown date in this time frame, the US Army 38th Air Defense Artillery Brigade assigned Battery B, 6th Battalion, 44th Air Defense Artillery Regiment, a HAWK missile unit to the base. The Tactical Operations site was located on a hill just off the coast, but near the base. Its mission was to defend the base from air attack. The HAWK site and all hardware was turned over to the Korean Army sometime in the early 1990s.

After the USS Pueblo was captured by the North Koreans in January 1968, the 4th Tactical Fighter Wing deployed to Korea on January 25, 1968. Under the command of Colonel Jack Hayes, F-4D Phantom IIs arrived at Kunsan on January 29, 1968, as part of Operation Combat Fox. In March, Hayes was replaced by Colonel Chuck Yeager, the 4th remained in Korea until replaced by the 354th Tactical Fighter Wing. The 354th TFW consisting of the Kansas Air National Guard, the Ohio Air National Guard, (ANG) and a few members of the District of Columbia Air National Guard flying the F-100, arrived at Kunsan in July 1968, as part of the buildup of forces in Korea. In 1969, the wing began a transition from the F-100 to the F-4 Phantom. The 354th remained until June 1970, when the base again returned to hosting temporary deployments, such as the four-month activation of the 54th Tactical Fighter Wing from June through October 1970.

The 3d Tactical Fighter Wing, previously designated the 3d Bombardment Wing, stationed at Kunsan in the early 1950s, arrived in March 1971 to assume control of the base. Like the 354th and 54th, the 3d Tactical Fighter Wing flew the F-4 Phantom. Aircraft came primarily from Misawa AB Japan, 475th Tactical Fighter Wing after it was inactivated and as were most of the personnel initially assigned to the 3rd TFW. When it first activated in May, the wing contained the 35th, 36th and 80th Tactical Fighter Squadron. In September, the 36th TFS transferred to Osan AB.

In September 1974, the 8th Tactical Fighter Wing, the "Wolf Pack," was transferred from Ubon Air Base, Thailand to replace the 3rd at Kunsan. The move took place in name only, as the 8th moved without personnel or equipment, absorbing all assets of the 3d Tactical Fighter Wing. This included the two flying squadrons, which continued to operate as the 35th and 80th Tactical Fighter Squadrons, reuniting the wing with two of its original squadrons.

Since then, the 8th has continued to serve as host unit of Kunsan Air Base, continually improving the base's facilities over the years.

In February 2018, it was announced that following the completion of construction of hangars and supporting facilities at the base, 12 MQ-1C Gray Eagle UAS' will be deployed to Kunsan in March/April 2018.

=== Major Commands ===
- US Army Pacific Air Command, (1946–47)
- Far East Air Forces, (1947–57)
- Pacific Air Forces, (1957–present)

=== Base operating units ===
- 27th Fighter-Escort Wing, (April – May 1951)
- 931st Engineering Aviation Group (May – August 1951)
- 3d Bombardment Wing (August 1951 – September 1954)
- 6170th Air Base Group (September 1954 – April 1956)
- 6170th Air Base Squadron (April 1956 – March 1959)
- 6175th Air Base Group (March 1959 – August 1968)
- 354th Tactical Fighter Wing (August 1968 – June 1970)
- 6175th Air Base Group (June 1970 – March 1971)
- 3d Tactical Fighter Wing (March 1971 – September 1974)
- 8th Fighter Wing (September 1974 – present)

=== Major USAF units assigned ===
- 27th Fighter-Escort Wing (April 1951)
- 3d Bombardment Wing (August 1951 – October 1954)
- 474th Fighter-Bomber Wing (July 1952 – April 1953)
- 49th Fighter-Bomber Wing (April – November 1953)
- 354th Tactical Fighter Wing (July 1968 – June 1970)
- 54th Tactical Fighter Wing (June – October 1970)
- 3d Tactical Fighter Wing (March 1971 – September 1974)
- 8th Fighter Wing (September 1974–present)

Kunsan has provided support for F-84G Thunderjet, B-26 Invader, F-86 Sabre, RF-100 Super Sabre, RB-57 Canberra, F-100 Super Sabre, F-4 Phantom II, and F-16 Fighting Falcon operations.

== Based Units ==
Flying and notable non-flying units based at Kunsan Air Base.

Units marked GSU are Geographically Separate Units, which although based at Kunsan, are subordinate to a parent unit based at another location.

=== United States Air Force ===
Pacific Air Forces (PACAF)

- Seventh Air Force
  - 8th Fighter Wing
    - Headquarters 8th Fighter Wing
    - 8th Operations Group
      - 8th Operations Support Squadron
      - 35th Fighter Squadron – F-16C/D – Fighting Falcon
      - 80th Fighter Squadron – F-16C/D – Fighting Falcon
    - 8th Maintenance Group
      - 8th Aircraft Maintenance Squadron
      - 8th Maintenance Squadron
      - 8th Maintenance Operations Squadron
    - 8th Mission Support Group
      - 8th Civil Engineer Squadron
      - 8th Communications Squadron
      - 8th Force Support Squadron
      - 8th Logistics Readiness Squadron
      - 8th Security Forces Squadron
    - 8th Medical Group
      - 8th Medical Operations Squadron
      - 8th Medical Support Squadron

Air Mobility Command (AMC)

- United States Air Force Expeditionary Center
  - 515th Air Mobility Operations Wing
    - 515th Air Mobility Operations Group
      - 731st Air Mobility Squadron
        - Operating Location Alpha (GSU)

=== United States Army ===
US Army Pacific (USARPAC) Eighth Army

- 94th Army Air and Missile Defense Command
  - 35th Air Defense Artillery Brigade
    - 2nd Battalion, 1st Air Defense Artillery Regiment – MIM-104 Patriot
- 65th Medical Brigade
    - 25th Transportation Battalion

=== Republic of Korea Air Force ===
Air Force Operations Command

- Air Combat Command
  - 38th Fighter Group
    - 111th Fighter Squadron (111대대) – F-16C/D and KF-16C/D

== See also ==
- United States Forces Korea
- United States Pacific Air Forces
