= 8th Operations Group =

US Air Force unit

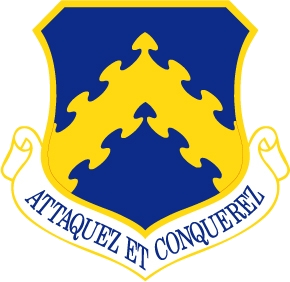
- Emblem of the 8th Operations Group
- Active: 1931–1957; 1992–present
- Country: United States
- Branch: United States Air Force
- Nickname: Cyclone's Flying Circus
- Engagements: : World War II; Asiatic-Pacific Campaign (1942–1945): Army of Occupation (Japan) (1945–1952); Korean Service (1950–1953)

Commanders
- Notable commanders: Col. Emmett "Cyclone" Davis

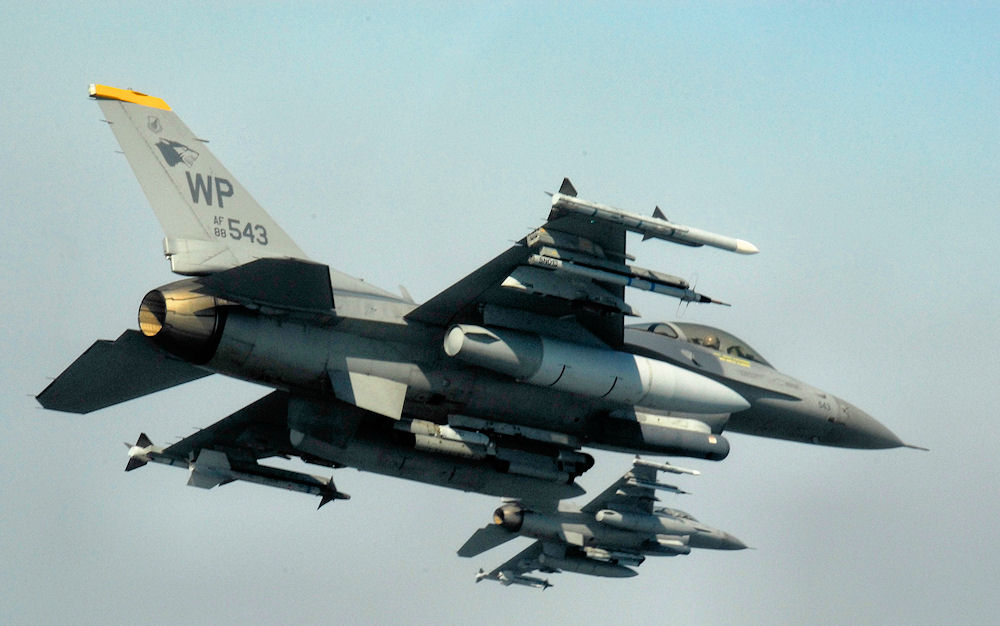
80th Fighter Squadron F-16CJ Block 40D Fighting Falcon 88-0543

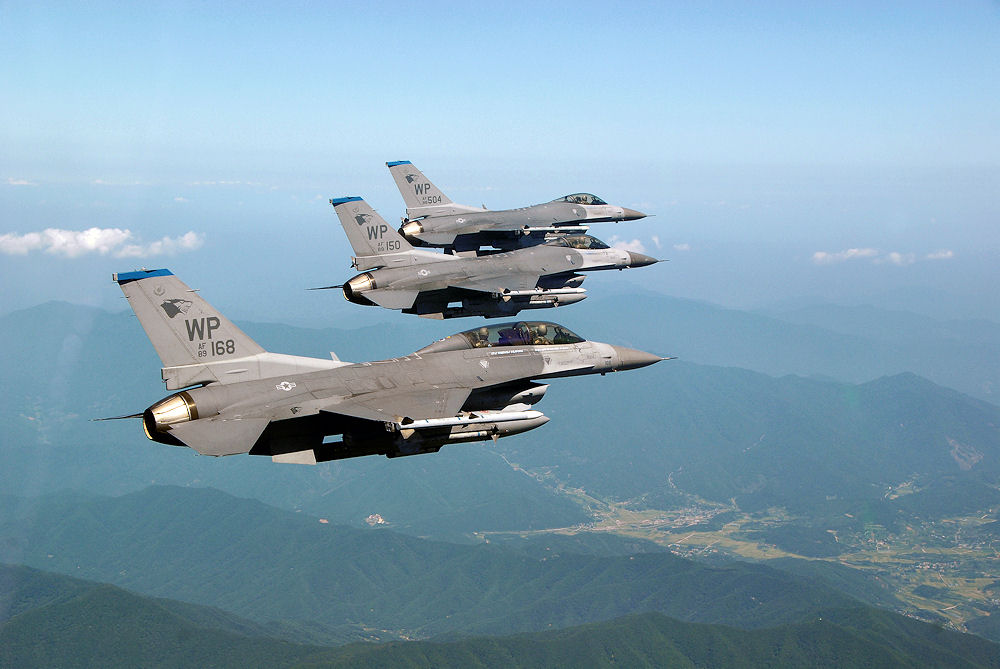
35th Fighter Squadron F-16DJ Block 40F 89-2168 and CJs 89-2150 and 88-0504 in formation

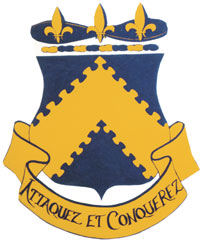
Emblem of the World War II 8th Fighter Group

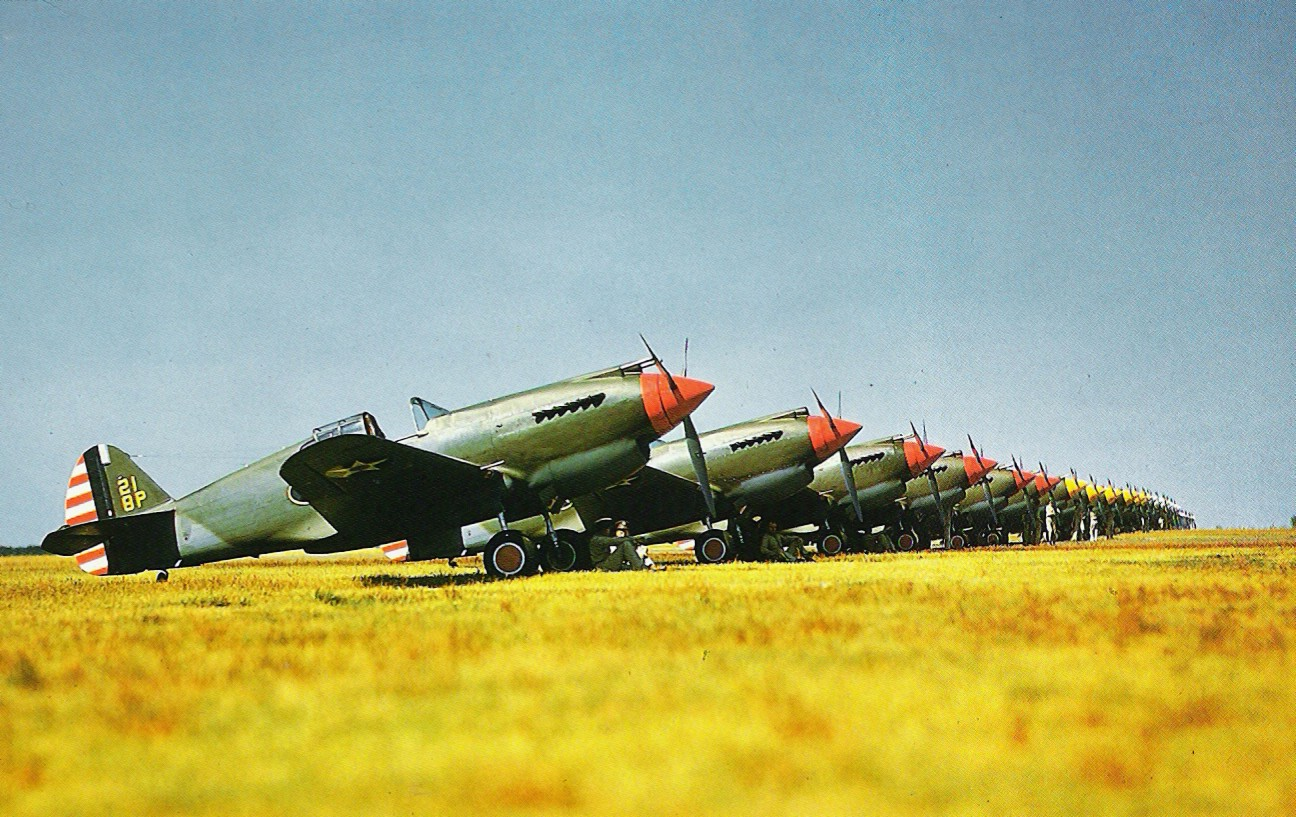
P-40s of the 33rd PS, 8th PG, at Langley Field, Va., in 1941.

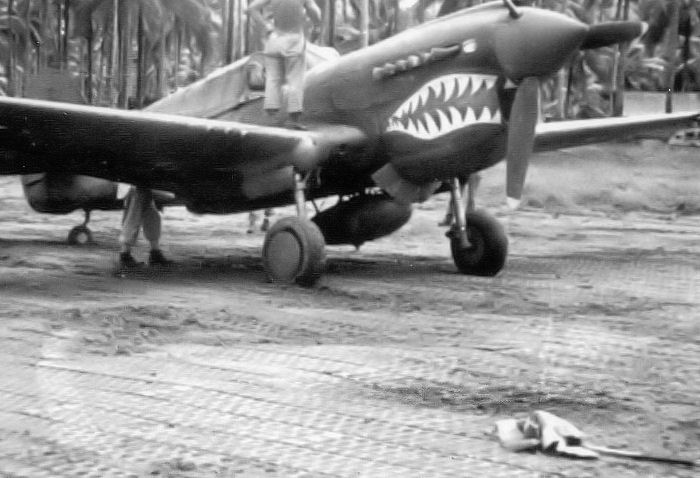
P-40 of the 8th Fighter Group, New Guinea, 1942

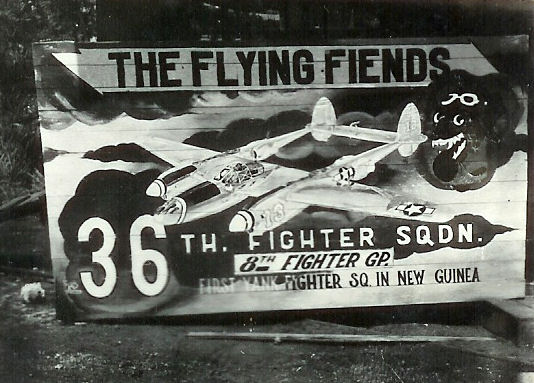
Sign of the 36th Fighter Squadron, New Guinea, 1943

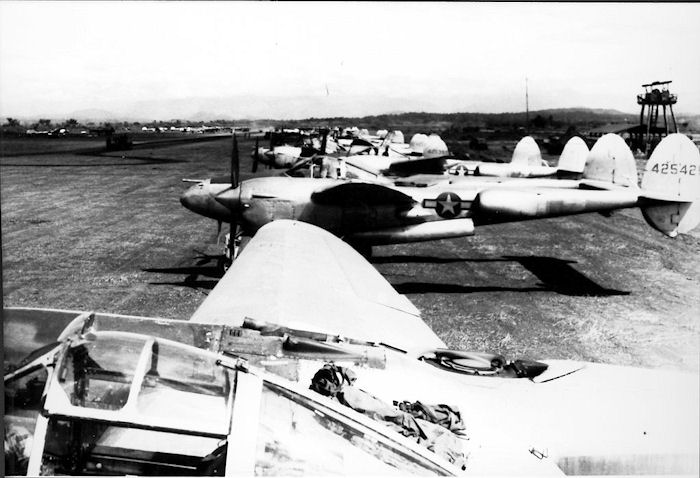
P-38s of the 38th Fighter Squadron, Mindiro, Filipinos, 1944

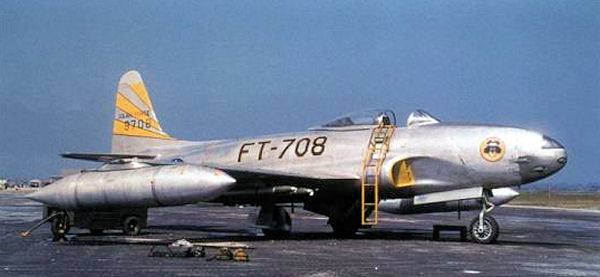
Lockheed F-80C-10-LO Shooting Star 49-8708 of the 8th Fighter-Bomber Group, Korea, 1950.

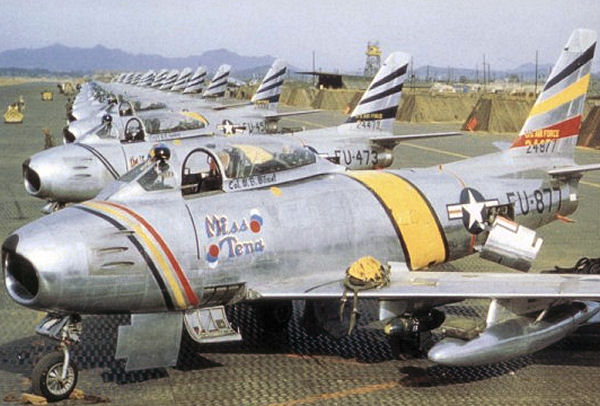
North American F-86F-30-NA Sabres of the 8th Fighter-Bomber Group, Korea, 1953. Serial 52-4877 in front in Wing Commander's colors, 52-4473 alongside.

The 8th Operations Group (8 OG) is the operational flying component of the United States Air Force 8th Fighter Wing. It is stationed at Kunsan Air Base, South Korea, and is a part of Pacific Air Forces (PACAF).

The group is a direct successor organization of the 8th Pursuit Group, one of the 15 original combat air groups formed by the Army before World War II.

During World War II, the unit operated primarily in the Southwest Pacific Theater as part of Fifth Air Force. When the unit arrived in Brisbane, Australia, in April 1942, three squadrons were assigned: the 35th, 36th and 80th Pursuit Squadrons. Since fighting became the new objective, the unit took on the new designation of the 8th Fighter Group. During the course of World War II in the Pacific, the 8th participated in battles in Port Moresby, Nadaab, Owi, Zamboanga, the Philippines, Minadoro, Ie Shima and Japan. The Group participated in nine campaigns and received two Distinguished Unit Citations. The 8th spawned twenty-seven "Aces" and accounted for destroying 449 enemy aircraft during World War II.

During the Korean War, the group was the first USAF air unit committed to combat, first jet unit, first unit to shoot down an enemy airplane, first to fly 255 sorties in one day, first to fly 50,000 sorties in jet warfare, first to fly 60,000 sorties, and first to fly 291 sorties in a single day. The Group added eleven streamers to their flag, two Republic of Korea citations, and another Distinguished Unit Citation.

== Overview ==
The 8 OG is a combat-ready fighter group composed of two deployable Lockheed F-16CJ fighter squadrons (Tail Code: WP), and one operational support squadron. The group is assigned the following squadrons:

- 35th Fighter Squadron (Blue tail stripe) "Pantons"
- 80th Fighter Squadron (Yellow tail stripe) "Juvats"

The squadrons conduct interdiction, close air support, counter air, air superiority, and suppression of enemy air defense missions

=== Heraldry ===
The group's emblem, approved in 1934, is a simple chevron in the stylized shape of clouds.

== History ==
For additional history and lineage, see 8th Fighter Wing

=== Origins ===
The 8th Operations Group's origins go back to World War I, when the 33rd, 35th and 36th Aero Squadrons were activated in 1917 at Camp Kelly, Texas. These squadrons would later be combined in the 8th Pursuit Group.

In 1931, the 8th Pursuit Group was reactivated helped fly the air corps air mail routes across the United States. In addition, the group trained, took part in maneuvers and reviews, and tested planes and equipment. Initially, the group had two flying squadrons assigned, but both operated from other bases. The 36th Pursuit Squadron flew from Selfridge Field, Michigan, while the 55th Pursuit Squadron operated from Mather Field, California.

In June 1932 the group reorganized. It gained the 33rd and 35th Pursuit Squadrons, and activated at Langley Field, Virginia. The 36th moved from Selfridge to Langley to join the rest of the group. At the same time, the 55th Pursuit Squadron transferred to the 20th Fighter Group, leaving the 8th with three squadrons.

At Langley the group trained in such aircraft as the Consolidated PB-2, Curtiss P-6, and Boeing P-12. Over the next several years, the group transitioned to such newer aircraft as the Seversky P-35, Curtiss P-36 Hawk, Bell P-39 Airacobra, and the Curtiss P-40.

Significantly, on 11 October 1940, the 8th Pursuit Group participated in a test designed to compare the take-off runs of standard Navy and Army aircraft. On that day, 24 P-40s from the 8th Pursuit Group launched from the USS Wasp, an aircraft carrier, and returned to Langley Field. That experiment, the first time that Army planes had flown from a Navy carrier, foreshadowed the use of the ship in the ferry role that it performed admirably in World War II.

In December 1940, the group became part of the defense force for the New York metropolitan area, being reassigned to Mitchel Field on Long Island. At Mitchel, the 33rd Pursuit Squadron was transferred to the 342d Composite Group in Iceland in August 1941 to engage in North Atlantic defense. This left the group with two flying squadrons, the 35th and 36th. To replace the 33rd the 58th was activated, but then was transferred to form the 33rd Fighter Group. Finally, the 80th Squadron was activated on 10 January 1942.

=== World War II ===
In May 1942, the unit was redesignated as the 8th Fighter Group, as fighting became the new mission. The group was assigned to the South West Pacific Theatre and deployed Brisbane, Australia, sailing on the Army Transport Ship Maui. After a 21-day voyage, headquarters was established on 6 March 1942. Upon completion of the reassembly of planes, men and equipment they moved to the Townsville area.

On 26 April while the U.S. Navy was preparing to engage the Japanese invasion fleet headed for Port Moresby, New Guinea, men from the 35th and 36th arrived at the 7 mile strip where the 75th and 76th Australian Squadrons were sacrificing their last P-40s to the Japanese Zero's. When the squadrons arrived their first act included preparation and take-off over the Owen Stanley Range to surprise the Japanese at Lae. Meanwhile, the Japanese fleet withdrew from the intended invasion and the Battle of the Coral Sea. During the month of May the 35th and 36th were experiencing not only daily and night raids, but endured the shortage of food, excessive heat, rain, mud, mosquito's and necessary parts for planes and vehicles plus continuous alerts, bombing and strafing.

Returning to Townsville in June, the 35th and 36th Squadrons were equipped and prepared to leave for Oro Bay when word was received that the Japanese began offensive action to occupy the same territory. On 20 July 1942 the 80th left the group for New Guinea equipped with P-400s for action near Port Moresby.

In August 1942 the Japanese invaded Milne Bay where it was reported that the 8th Fighter Control Squadron played an important part of the ground defense with four wheel drive vehicles capable of moving supplies and ammo through mud to the ground personnel. Once again the 35th and the 36th replaced the Australian 75th and 76th in Milne Bay on 18 September 1942 with the 80th following on 8 November for limited air action. The group served in combat until February 1943 flying P-40s. In February 1943 the Group returned to Mareeba where the 80th was equipped with the P-38 Lightning which they took to Port Moresby in March.

Resuming operations in April 1943, the 8th served in combat operations through the rest of the Second World War, providing cover for Allied landings, escorting bombers, and attacking enemy airfields. The group supported operations of the Marines at Cape Gloucester, February and March 1944; flew long-range escort and attack missions to Borneo, Ceram, Halmahera, and the southern Philippines; provided cover for convoys; and attacked enemy shipping.

The unit won a Distinguished Unit Citation for strafing a Japanese naval force off Mindoro on 26 December 1944. The group went on to cover landings at Lingayen; support ground forces on Luzon; escort bombers to targets on the Asian mainland and on Formosa; and, in the last days of the war, attack enemy airfields and railways in Japan.

After V-J Day, the group remained as part of the Far East Air Forces occupation force at Ashiya Air Field on the island of Kyūshū.

Initially flying North American P-51D Mustangs in 1946, the 8th provided air defense for the Japanese region. While stationed in Japan, the wing upgraded to the more sophisticated Lockheed F-80C Shooting Star jet fighter in 1948.

=== Korean War ===
It began operations in the Korean War on 26 June 1950 by providing cover for the evacuation of US personnel from Seoul, entering into combat the next day. The group is known for the heroic actions of its members, including Major Charles J. Loring, a pilot in the 80th FS, who was posthumously awarded the Medal of Honor for his actions on 22 November 1952 when he flew his badly damaged F-80 aircraft into an enemy artillery emplacement near Sniper Ridge so that entrenched U.S. Infantry men could escape. During the next three years, the 8th flew more than 60,000 sorties while operating from bases in both Korea and Japan. The wing participated in 10 campaigns and earned three unit citations.

Following the war, it performed air defense in Japan and maintained a quick reaction strike force. The group was not operational from 1 February 1957 until its inactivation in October 1957.

=== Modern era ===
Activated again in 1992, and assumed responsibility for flight operations of the 8th Fighter Wing.

=== Lineage ===
- Authorized on the inactive list as the 8th Pursuit Group on 24 March 1923

Redesignated 8th Pursuit Group, Air Corps, on 8 August 1926
Activated on 1 April 1931
Redesignated: 8th Pursuit Group on 1 September 1936
Redesignated: 8th Pursuit Group (Fighter) on 6 December 1939
Redesignated: 8th Pursuit Group (Interceptor) on 12 March 1941
Redesignated: 8th Fighter Group on 15 May 1942
Redesignated: 8th Fighter Group, Single Engine, 20 August 1943
Redesignated: 8th Fighter-Bomber Group on 20 January 1950
Inactivated on 1 October 1957

- Redesignated: 8th Tactical Fighter Group on 31 July 1985 (Remained inactive)
- Redesignated: 8th Operations Group on 1 February 1992

Activated on 3 February 1992.

=== Commanders ===
- Col. Emmett "Cyclone" Davis: 18 January 1944 – c. 1 July 1944
- Col. Emmett "Cyclone" Davis: c. late May 1945 – c. January 1946
- Col. Stanley R. Stewart; September 1946 - April 1947 & Commanding Officer Ashiya Army Air Base from 28 October, 1946, to 25 March, 1947. (Possibly also until March, 1948.) [From personnel records and citation records of 315th Composite Wing, Col. H. Parker, Commanding Officer.

=== Assignments ===
- 2d Bombardment (later, 2d; 2d Bombardment) Wing, 1 April 1931
- 7th Pursuit Wing, 18 December 1940
- I Interceptor Command, 31 August 1941
- US Army Forces in Australia, c. 6 March 1942
- AAF Southwest Pacific Area, April 1942
- V Fighter Command, September 1942
- V Fighter Command, November 1942

Attached to: 86th Fighter Wing, 1 May 1944 – 16 August 1945
Attached to: 310th Bombardment Wing, 16 August 1945 – 25 March 1946

- 315th Composite Wing, c. 31 May 1946
- 8th Fighter (later, 8th Fighter-Bomber) Wing, 18 August 1948 – 1 October 1957

Attached to 6131st Fighter [later, 6131st Tactical Support] Wing, 14 August-1 December 1950

- 8th Fighter Wing, 3 February 1992–present

=== Components ===
- 33d Pursuit Squadron: 25 June 1932 – August 1941
- 35th Pursuit (later, 35th Fighter, 35th Fighter-Bomber, 35th Fighter) Squadron 25 June 1932 – 1 October 1957; 3 February 1992–present
- 36th Pursuit (later, 36th Fighter, 36th Fighter-Bomber) Squadron: 1 April – 30 June 1931; 15 June 1932 – 1 October 1957
- 55th Pursuit Squadron: 1 April 1931 – 15 June 1932
- 68th Fighter (later 68th Fighter-All Weather) Squadron: 15 December 1945 – 19 February 1947
- 80th Pursuit (later, 80th Fighter, 80th Fighter-Bomber; 80th Tactical Fighter) Squadron 10 January 1942 – 26 December 1945; 20 February 1947 – 30 September 1957, (detached 24 August-25 September 1950; 25 September-27 October 1950; 29 October 1954 – 10 February 1955; 10 February 1955 – 18 October 1956); 3 February 1992–present

=== Stations ===
- Langley Field, Virginia, 1 April 1931
- Mitchel Field, New York, c. 5 November 1940 – 26 January 1942
- Archerfield Airport, Brisbane, Australia, 6 March 1942
- RAAF Base Townsville, Australia, 29 July 1942
- Gurney Airfield, Milne Bay, New Guinea, 18 September 1942
- Mareeba Airfield, Australia, February 1943
- Port Moresby Airfield Complex, New Guinea, 16 May 1943
- Finschhafen Airfield, New Guinea, 23 December 1943
- Cape Gloucester Airfield, New Britain, c. 20 February 1944
- Nadzab Airfield Complex, New Guinea, 14 March 1944
- Owi Airfield, Schouten Islands, 17 June 1944
- Wama Airfield, Morotai, Dutch East Indies, 19 September 1944
- McGuire Field, San Jose, Mindoro, Philippines, 20 December 1944
- Ie Shima, Okinawa, 6 August 1945
- Fukuoka Airfield, Japan, 22 November 1945
- Ashiya Airfield, Japan, 20 May 1946
- Itazuke Airfield, Japan, September 1946
- Ashiya Airfield, Japan, 13 April 1947
- Itazuke Airfield, Japan, 25 March 1949
- Tsuiki Airfield, Japan, 11 August 1950
- Suwon AB (K-13), South Korea, 7 October 1950
- Kimpo AB (K-14), South Korea, 28 October 1950
- Pyongyang AB (K-23), North Korea, 25 November 1950
- Seoul Air Base (K-16), South Korea, 3 December 1950
- Itazuke AB, Japan, 10 December 1950
- Kimpo AB (K-14), South Korea, 25 June 1951
- Suwon AB (K-13), South Korea, 24 August 1951
- Itazuke AB, Japan, 20 October 1954 – 1 October 1957
- Kunsan AB, South Korea, 3 February 1992–present

=== Aircraft ===
- Prior to 1940: P-6, P-12, PB-2A, and P-36
- P-40 Warhawk, 1940–1941; 1943–1944
- P-39 Airacobra, 1941–1943
- P-38 Lightning, 1943–1946
- P-47 Thunderbolt, 1943–1944
- P-51 Mustang, 1946–1950
- P-80 Shooting Star, 1949–1953
- F-86 Sabre, 1953–1957
- F-100 Super Sabre, 1957
- F-16 Falcon, 1992–present

== See also ==
- United States Army Air Forces in Australia
