= Emmett Smith Davis =

United States Air Force officer

- Born: December 12, 1918; Roosevelt, Utah
- Died: November 3, 2015 (aged 96); Highland, Utah
- Burial place: Highland City Cemetery, Highland, Utah
- Military career
- Allegiance: United States
- Branch: United States Army Air Forces; United States Air Force
- Service years: 1940–1963
- Rank: Colonel
- Nickname: Cyclone
- Commands: 35th Fighter Squadron; 8th Fighter Group; 369th Fighter Group; 3200th Proof Test Group; 65th Air Division; 312th Fighter-Bomber Group; Cannon Air Force Base; 48th Tactical Fighter Wing
- Conflicts: World War II; Korean War
- Awards: Silver Star; Legion of Merit; Distinguished Flying Cross (2); Air Medal (4)
- Other work: Hughes Aircraft

Emmett Smith "Cyclone" Davis (December 12, 1918 – November 3, 2015) was a career officer and pilot in the United States Air Force, retiring as a colonel. He was an American and United States Army Air Forces fighter pilot in the Pacific of World War II and a jet fighter pilot with the Air Force in the Korean War.

== Early years ==
Davis was born December 12, 1918, in Roosevelt, Utah. He was the fifth of eight children. His family was poor and lived in a tent. His father had been in an infantry in Wyoming and had served with Teddy Roosevelt in the Rough Riders in the Spanish–American War.

When Davis was in the 3rd grade his family moved to Duchesne, Utah. His fourth grade teacher's husband had purchased an old Curtis Jenny mail plane. Emmett later said, "I used to go up and watch him fly that old airplane, and I guess that was really when I got struck with being an aviator". After his 7th grade year his family moved to Salt Lake City, Utah. There he graduated from East High School. He later attended the University of Utah. In 1939, his family again moved, this time to Compton, California.

== Military career ==
=== United States Army Air Corps ===
On April 5, 1940, Davis joined the United States Army Air Corps. He attended Primary Flight Training School in Glendale, California, training on a Stearman PT-13. In spite of his early dreams of being an aviator he encountered problems early in training. During an engine failure scenario the instructor disliked his choices and wanted to "wash him out". The chief instructor, however, decided to give him a second chance and began personally instructing him. He progressed and attended Basic Flight Training at Randolph Field.

Later, during Advanced Flight Training at Kelly Field, Texas, Davis was intent on piloting multi-engine aircraft - specifically B-17s. His flight instructor, however, told him, "No Davis you're a fighter pilot and that's where you want to be".

Davis graduated with the Flying School Class of '40 G and commissioned as second lieutenant November 15, 1940. He elected to join a group to deliver P-36s to Wheeler Army Airfield, Hawaii in February 1941 aboard the USS Enterprise (CV-6). Having only 17 hours of flight experience and no carrier experience and while 100 miles from shore Davis was the second plane on the flight deck (immediately behind the commander) to take off the deck of the Enterprise to Wheeler Field.

==== Nickname: Cyclone ====
While stationed at Wheeler Field, Oahu, Hawaii the pilots would engage in mock dogfights. One of Davis' signature maneuvers was a tight, climbing spiral with a hammerhead that would put him on the pursuers tail. Other pilots began referring to the maneuver as "the cyclone" and eventually referred to Davis as Cyclone Davis. Davis embraced the nickname and used it throughout the remainder of his life almost to the exclusion of his first name. Throughout World War II whenever Davis commanded a fighter group it was known as Cyclone's Flying Circus.

One of "Cyclone"'s peers, Gabby Gabreski who could beat the other pilots and even the commander (and later became one of the leading aces of WW II) could not beat "Cyclone" and later wrote of him: "he was in a class by himself."

=== World War II ===
Second Lieutenant Gabby Gabreski (left) and First Lieutenant Cyclone Davis (second from left) at the Wheeler Field Officers Club, Hawaii, 1941

Cyclone Davis standing next to the P-40 that he flew to score all of his victories

==== 35th Fighter Squadron ====
Davis took command of the 35th Fighter Squadron, a Bell P-39 Airacobra unit, on 7 March 1943. In the summer of 1943 Davis was able to get his squadron reequipped with the superior Curtiss P-40N Warhawk.

==== 8th Fighter Group ====
Davis assumed command of the 8th Fighter Group January 18, 1944. In early March 1944 he began converting the P-40s of the 35th and 36th Fighter Squadrons to P-38s with twin engines and longer range to match what was then being flown by the 80th Fighter Squadron. Davis was recalled to the States at the end of June 1944 but returned in late May 1945 to resume command through December of that year.

=== Bendix Trophy ===
Davis competed in the 1951 Bendix Trophy Transcontinental Air Race – jet class. He flew an F-84E from Muroc Field to Detroit, Michigan. Notwithstanding an in-flight failure resulting in cockpit depressurization, Davis succeeded at finishing second behind Colonel Keith K. Compton

=== Military ranks ===
Davis' rank promotions:

Colonel c. mid-January 1951 (age 32 – he had been promoted to full colonel in the reserves several years earlier)

Lieutenant colonel March 18, 1944 (age 25)

Major July 6, 1943 (age 24)

Captain August 8, 1942 (age 23)

First lieutenant April 21, 1942 (age 23)

Second lieutenant November 15, 1940 (age 21)

=== Military awards ===
Davis' military decorations and awards include:

Silver Star
Legion of Merit
Distinguished Flying Cross with one Oak leaf cluster
Air Medal with three Oak leaf clusters
Air Force Commendation Medal with two Oak leaf clusters
Air Force Presidential Unit Citation with two Oak leaf clusters
American Defense Service Medal
American Campaign Medal
Asiatic-Pacific Campaign Medal with one silver star
World War II Victory Medal
Army of Occupation Medal with Japan Clasp
National Defense Service Medal with two bronze stars
Korean Service Medal with two bronze stars
Air Force Longevity Service Award with four Oak leaf clusters
Philippine Liberation Medal with one bronze star
Philippine Independence Medal
Philippine Republic Presidential Unit Citation
Republic of Korea Presidential Unit Citation
United Nations Korea Medal
Korean War Service Medal

Honorable Service Lapel Button

== Retirement ==
Emmett Smith Davis retired from the Air force in 1962 and moved to Palos Verdes, California, where he worked for Hughes Aircraft Company. In 1972 he and his family moved to Westlake Village, California, and finally in 2005 to Highland, Utah.

== Legacy ==
In 2016, he was inducted in the Utah Aviation Hall of Fame.
