= Hill Aerospace Museum =

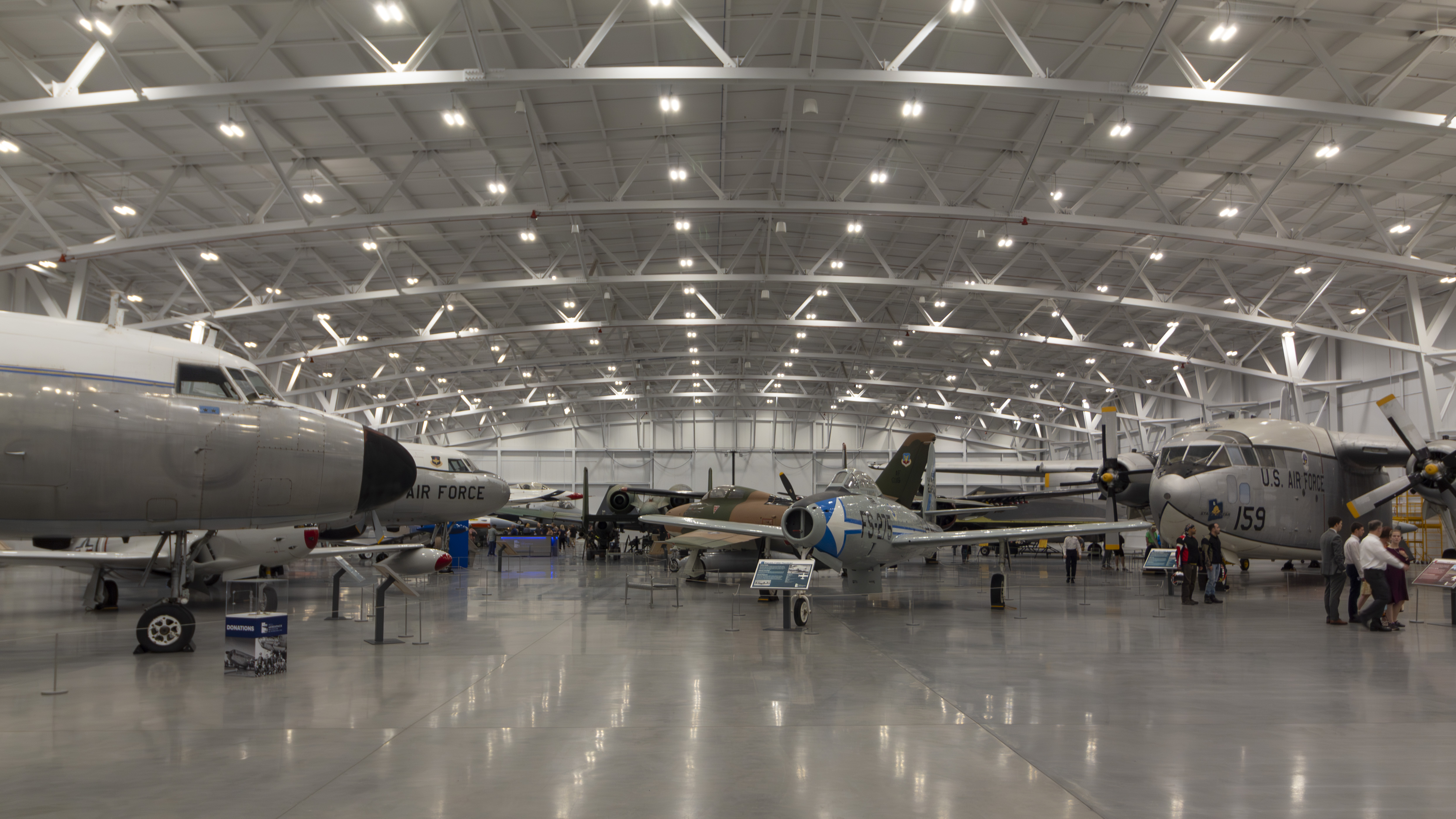
- The L.S. Skaggs Gallery at Hill Air Force Base Museum in 2024.

- Location within Utah
- Established: 1981
- Location: Hill Air Force Base, Roy, Utah
- Coordinates: 41°09′43″N 112°01′10″W
- Type: Military aviation museum
- Collection size: 70+ aircraft
- Visitors: 265,000 annually
- Director: Aaron Clark
- Website: aerospaceutah.org

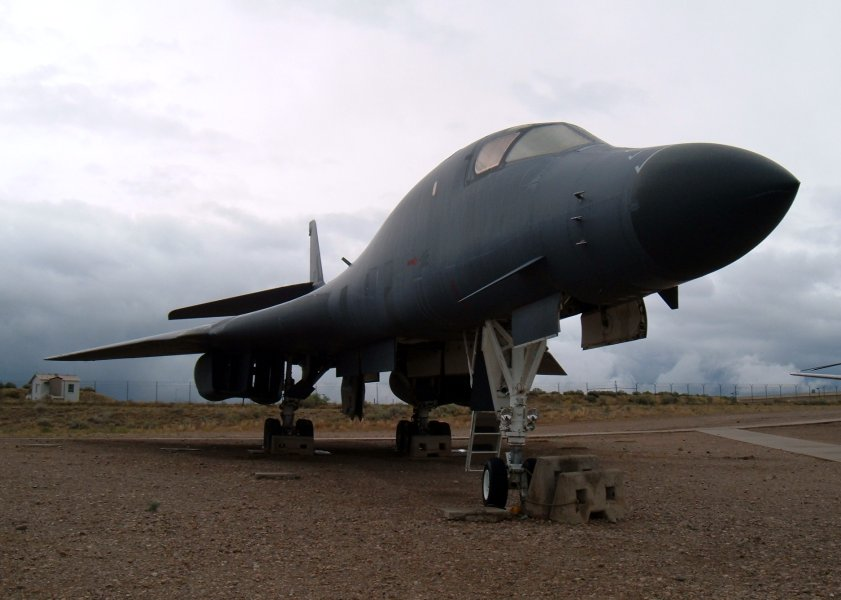
B-1B Lancer on display in the outdoor airpark.

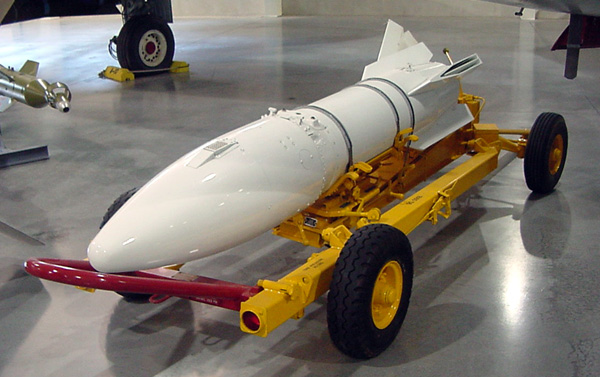
AIR-2 Genie nuclear air-to-air rocket sitting on a MF-9 Transport Trailer inside the jet hangar of Hill Aerospace Museum.

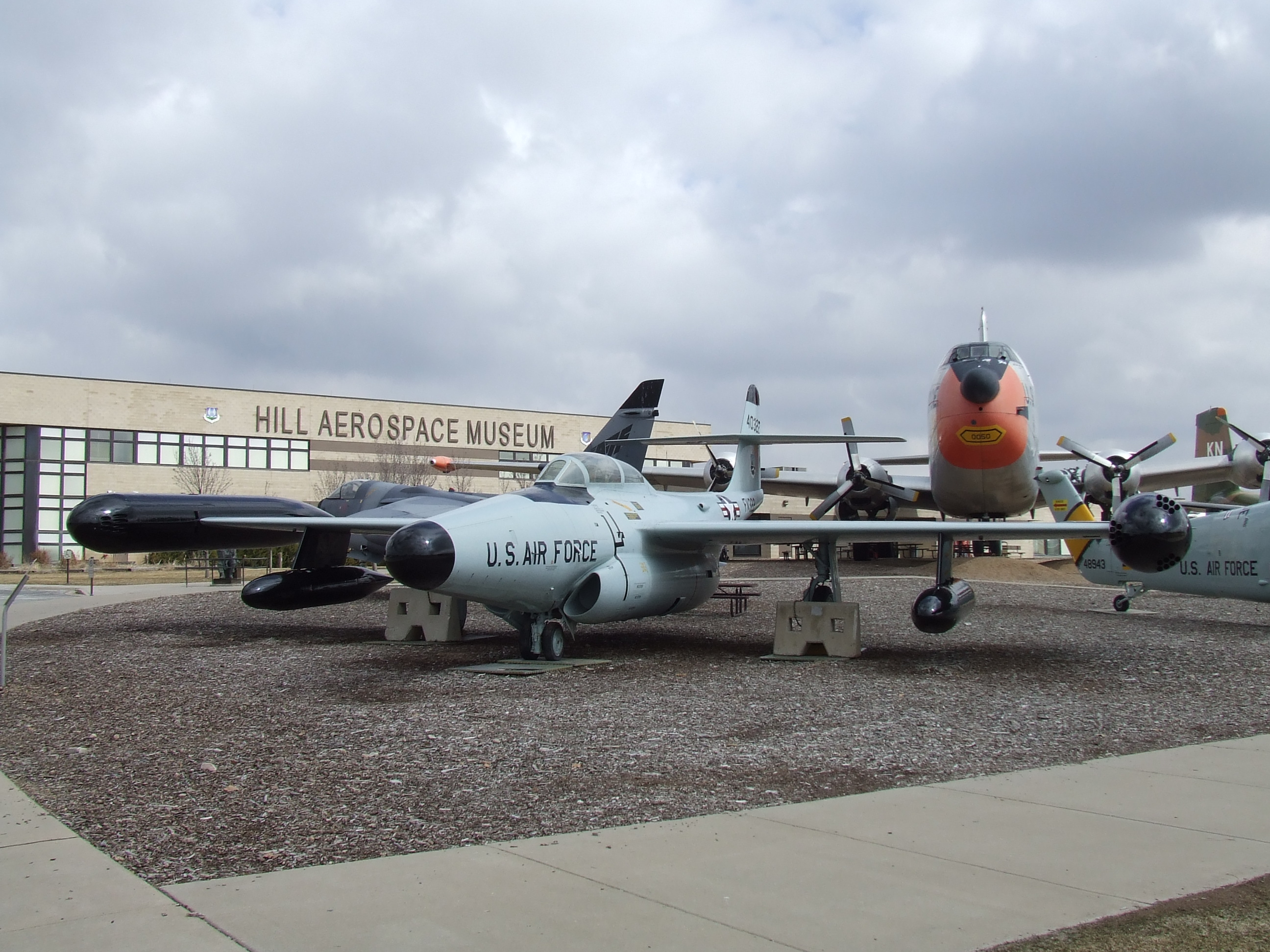
A Northrop F-89H Scorpion in the outdoor air park, in front of the museum

Hill Aerospace Museum is a military aviation museum located at Hill Air Force Base in Roy, Utah. It is dedicated to the history of the base and aviation in Utah.

== History ==
Preparations for a museum began in 1984, when ground was broken on an "Aerospace Park and Museum". (Note: Another museum, the ARRS Memorial Museum, had been previously established at the airbase in 1975.) The museum itself opened in 1987 in a World War II warehouse. By 1989, the original base chapel had been moved to the museum and rededicated. In 1991, a new 9,600 sq ft (890 m^{2}) administration building and 36,000 sq ft (3,300 m^{2}) hangar were dedicated.

The museum recovered a number of aircraft wrecks, including a B-24, B-26, P-38, and P-40 from Alaska in the mid-1990s. (Note: The aircraft were restored at Kal-Aero Service in San Diego, California.)

In 1996, the museum became the home of the Utah Aviation Hall of Fame. In 1997, it was alleged that seven years prior a number of artifacts and a C-131 were removed from the museum without authorization.

The museum grew again in 1999, when a second display hangar was opened as the Lindquist-Stewart Fighter Gallery. A mezzanine was added to the first hangar, now renamed the Hadley Gallery, the following year. An exhibit about Women Airforce Service Pilots was opened in 2004.

In 2014, the museum announced it would be removing 18 aircraft from its collection. Large scale repainting of the exterior display aircraft took place in 2015, with 5 airplanes and 2 missiles being affected. For the twentieth anniversary of its opening in 2016, the Utah Aviation Hall of Fame was renovated.

The museum completed the conversion of a C-130 fuselage into a classroom in 2019. The museum embarked on expansion in 2021, building a new restoration facility and receiving $12 million from the state for the construction of a third hangar. At the same time, it was forced to announce plans to demolish its World War II barracks as it was too deteriorated to repair. Ground was broken for the 80,000 sq ft (7,400 m^{2}) building and 7,000 sq ft (650 m^{2}) connector in October 2022. The museum began moving aircraft into the hangar in November 2023, which was dedicated as the L.S. Skaggs Gallery the following May.

== Facilities ==
The museum is also home to the Marc C. Reynolds Aerospace Center for Education, which is located inside a C-130 fuselage.

In addition to its collection of aircraft, the museum also houses the Major General Rex A. Hadley Research Library and Archives, which contains technical and historical information related to the aircraft on display.

Also onsite is the Col. Nathan H. Mazer Memorial Chapel.

== Exhibits ==
The museum has a number of exhibits about aviators from Utah such as Brigadier General Leon C. Packer and former senator Jake Garn. Other subjects include nose art of the 509th Composite Group and the Eighth Air Force.

== Collection ==
- Beechcraft C-45H Expeditor
- Bell TH-13F Sioux
- Bell HH-1H Iroquois
- Boeing B-17G Flying Fortress
- Boeing B-29 Superfortress
- Boeing B-52G Stratofortress
- Boeing KC-135E Stratotanker
- Boeing-Stearman PT-17 Kaydet
- Burgess Model F
- Cessna A-37 Dragonfly
- Cessna O-2A Skymaster
- Cessna U-3A
- Consolidated B-24D Liberator
- Convair C-131D Samaritan
- Convair T-29C
- Convair F-102A Delta Dagger
- Convair F-106A Delta Dart
- Curtiss JN-4D Jenny
- Curtiss P-40N Warhawk
- de Havilland Canada C-7B Caribou
- Douglas A-1E Skyraider
- Douglas A-26B Invader
- Douglas C-47B Skytrain
- Douglas C-54G Skymaster
- Douglas C-124C Globemaster II
- Fairchild C-119G Flying Boxcar
- Fairchild C-123K Provider
- Fairchild Republic A-10A Thunderbolt II
- General Atomics MQ-1B Predator
- General Dynamics F-16A Fighting Falcon
- General Dynamics F-16A Fighting Falcon
- General Dynamics F-16A Fighting Falcon
- General Dynamics F-111E Aardvark
- Kaman HH-43B Huskie
- Lockheed C-140B JetStar
- Lockheed F-104A Starfighter
- Lockheed F-117 Nighthawk
- Lockheed C-130E Hercules – fuselage only
- Lockheed NC-130B Hercules
- Lockheed P-38J Lightning
- Lockheed SR-71C Blackbird
- Lockheed T-33 – converted to resemble P-80
- Lockheed T-33A
- Lockheed U-2
- Lockheed Martin F-22 Raptor
- Martin RB-57A Canberra
- McDonnell F-101B Voodoo
- McDonnell Douglas F-4C Phantom II
- McDonnell Douglas F-4D Phantom II
- McDonnell Douglas F-15A Eagle
- McDonnell Douglas RF-4C Phantom II
- Mikoyan-Gurevich MiG-21F
- North American AT-6A Texan
- North American B-25N Mitchell
- North American F-86F Sabre
- North American F-86L Sabre
- North American F-100A Super Sabre
- North American P-51D Mustang
- North American T-28B Trojan
- North American T-39A Sabreliner
- North American Rockwell OV-10A Bronco
- Northrop F-5E Tiger II
- Northrop F-89H Scorpion
- Northrop GT-38A Talon
- Piasecki CH-21C Workhorse
- Piper L-4J Grasshopper
- PZL-Mielec Lim-5
- Republic F-84F Thunderstreak
- Republic F-84G Thunderjet
- Republic F-105D Thunderchief
- Republic F-105G Thunderchief
- Republic P-47D Thunderbolt
- Rockwell B-1B Lancer
- Ryan L-17 Navion
- Sikorsky CH-3E
- Sikorsky MH-53M Pave Low IV
- Vought YA-7F
- Vultee BT-13B Valiant

== See also ==
- Hill Air Force Base
- List of aerospace museums
