= SS Maui =

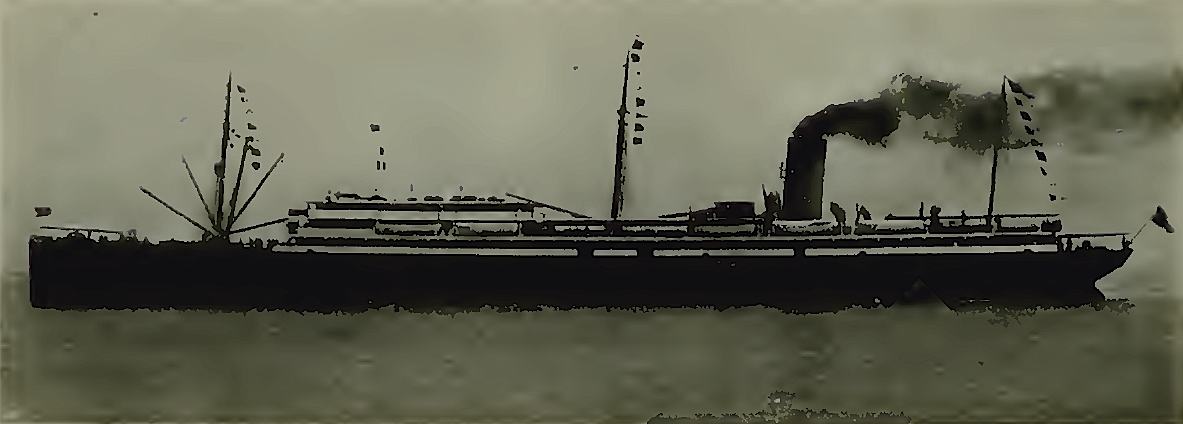
- Maui steaming down San Francisco Bay start of her maiden voyage to Honolulu 7 April 1917.

History

United States
- Name: Maui
- Namesake: The island of Maui in Hawaii (previous name retained)
- Owner: Matson Navigation Company; United States War Department
- Operator: Matson Navigation Company; United States Navy; Matson Navigation Company; United States Army
- Builder: Union Iron Works, San Francisco, California
- Launched: 23 December 1916
- Sponsored by: Mrs. William Matson
- Completed: 1917
- Acquired: (Navy) 6 March 1918
- Commissioned: (Navy) 6 March 1918
- Decommissioned: (Navy) September 1919
- Maiden voyage: 7 April 1917 San Francisco to Honolulu
- Renamed: USS Maui, USAT Maui
- Fate: Scrapped 1948
- Notes: Served as commercial passenger ship SS Maui 1917–1918 and 1919–1933, as cargo ship SS Maui 1934–1941, and as United States Army Transport USAT Maui 1941–1946; Scrapped 1948

General characteristics
- Type: Cargo liner later Troop transport
- Tonnage: 9,730 Gross register tons
- Displacement: 17,430 tons at 30 ft (9.1 m) draft
- Length: 501 ft 2 in (152.8 m) length overall; 484 ft (147.5 m) between perpendiculars
- Beam: 58 ft (18 m)
- Draft: 30 ft 2 in (9.19 m)
- Depth: 44 ft 9 in (13.6 m) molded to shelter deck
- Propulsion: Steam turbine
- Speed: 18 knots (33 km/h; 21 mph)
- Armament: (WW I Naval service) 4 × 6-inch (152-millimeter) guns; 2 × 1-pounder guns; 2 × machine guns

SS Maui was built as a commercial passenger ship in 1916 for the Matson Navigation Company of San Francisco and served between the United States West Coast and Hawaii until acquired for World War I service by the United States Navy on 6 March 1918. The ship was commissioned USS Maui (ID-1514) serving as a troop transport from 1918 to 1919. The ship was returned to Matson for commercial service September 1919 and continued in commercial service until purchased by the United States Army in December 1941. USAT Maui was laid up by the Army in 1946 and scrapped in 1948.

== Construction ==
Maui was built as the commercial passenger ship SS Maui in 1916 for the Matson Navigation Company of San Francisco by Union Iron Works at San Francisco, California, and launched on 23 December 1916 destined for the company's Hawaiian service. Under the Postal Subsidy Act of 1891 the ship was built as a second class auxiliary cruiser. At the time Maui was the largest passenger ship constructed on the Pacific Coast and the largest commercial installation of geared turbines.

== Characteristics ==
The hull was all steel construction with a double bottom, large hatches and cargo booms capable of handling up to 50-ton loads and four cargo ports on each side of the vessel. A deep tank between #2 and #3 holds, extending to the lower deck, was provided for carriage of molasses or fuel oil with a dedicated pump for loading and unloading.

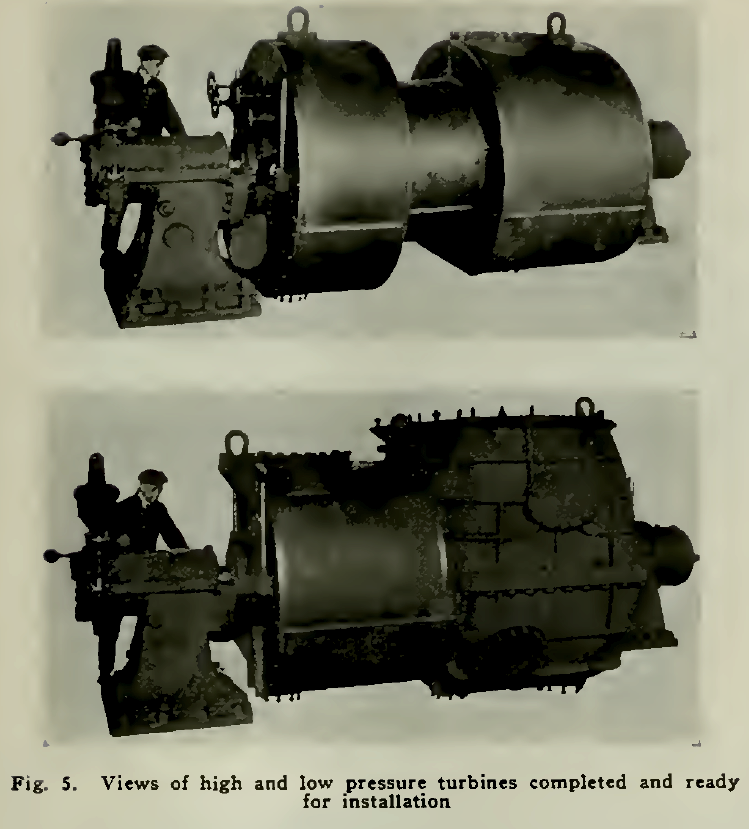
High and low pressure turbines for Maui.

Propulsion was by two sets of single reduction type geared Westinghouse Parsons turbines of 5,000 shaft horsepower (3,700 kW) for each set, composed of two turbines of 2,500 hp (1,900 kW) each, for a total of 10,000 hp (7,500 kW) at full load that were provided with steam by eight oil-fired Babcock & Wilcox water tube boilers. Maui was the first large twin screw passenger ship with geared turbines with previous single screw installations being between 2,000 and 3,000 hp (1,500 and 2,200 kW) rating. Each main propulsion unit was composed of a high and low pressure turbine and astern turbines developing 60% of the ahead power and, combined, designed for a speed of 16.5 knots (30.6 km/h; 19.0 mph) at propeller speed of 125 rpm under reduced boiler pressure and 129.5 at full pressure. Total weight of propulsion machinery, located aft, was 146.32 tons.

There was some uncertainty concerning the turbine teeth and surfaces as the delivery of engines had been rushed so that full testing in the factory had not taken place. As a result, the lubricant for the first two voyages had been lard oil subsequently replaced with mineral oil with good performance until gear abrasion due to lubrication failure was determined after the eighth voyage in Honolulu. The gears were transposed in San Francisco so that astern and forward surfaces were reversed and good surfaces were used for ahead turbines and lard oil was again used. During the transit from San Francisco to New York after requisition by the government salt water entered the system due to an accident in an oil cooler causing the lard oil to go highly acidic requiring a complete overhaul in Baltimore where again abrasion to tooth surfaces was detected due to inferior oil and another failure of the oil cooling system; however, Maui made a round trip to Europe without gear trouble. Despite these early problems the propulsion plant for Maui was proven so successful in both early commercial service and under demanding service with the Navy that similar Westinghouse propulsion plants were specified in the design of Matson's postwar ships Manulani and Manukai.

Electric power was provided by two 30-kilowatt and one 50-kilowatt generators supplying 110-volt direct current. Three ten ton Brunswick Refrigeration Company compressors chilled galley and pantry units and a large cluster of separate chill rooms for various classes of stores in a special gallery of 85 feet (25.9 m) by 30 feet (9.1 m) served by a handling room and a larger space for refrigerated cargo.

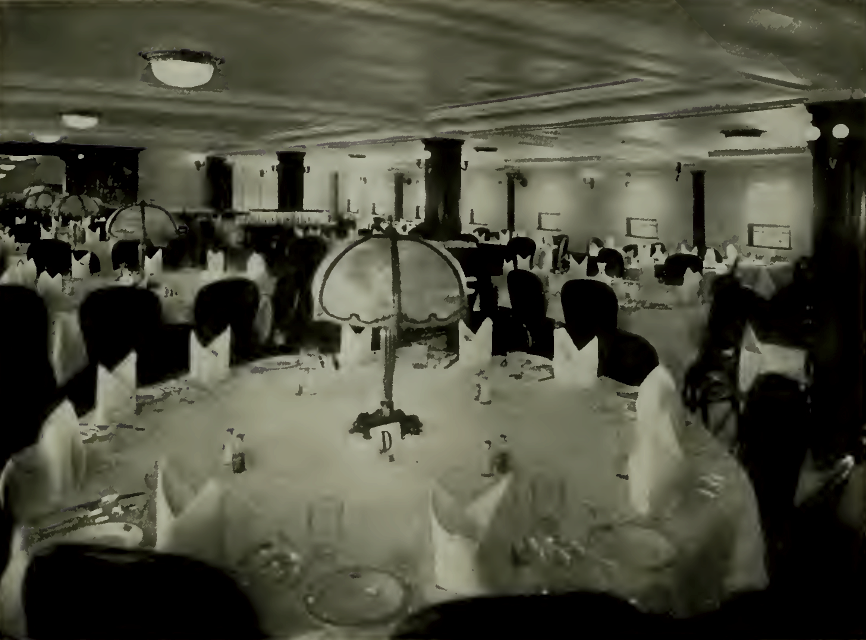
Main dining salon of Matson liner Maui in 1917.

Passenger accommodations were similar to the older Matsonia with a larger number of special staterooms with a capacity for 252 first class passengers in 64 three berth, 24 two berth and 12 single berth rooms.

== Passenger service ==
Sea trials were conducted 3 April 1917 and the new Matson liner departed San Francisco on maiden voyage to Honolulu on 7 April. Maui became the flagship of the Matson fleet and, with Matsonia, accounted not only for passenger traffic between the mainland and Hawaii but 20,000 tons a month of cargo each way bringing goods from the mainland and returning with sugar and pineapples. The sugar industry and islands received a "shock" with news announced in early June 1917 of a cable from President Matson concerning the fact the government would take over Maui for wartime service when she reached San Francisco on a voyage already underway and Matsonia as soon as she returned from the round trip. Sugar stocks were already building up in the islands and loss of the two ships was of concern with hopes expressed that seized German ships might be put on the route.

== Government requisition ==
=== United States Shipping Board service ===
Maui was one of the vessels requisitioned for World War I service with the United States Shipping Board and, on the anniversary of her launch, on 23 December 1917 sailed through the Golden Gate for the Atlantic stopping at Tocopilla, Chile to load nitrates. On 19 January 1918 the ship transited the Panama Canal arriving at Hampton Roads on 25 January awaiting orders which sent her to Charleston, South Carolina to unload the cargo. From Charleston Maui sailed to Baltimore, arriving on 14 February, where on 2 March the ship was ordered into Naval service.

=== United States Navy service ===
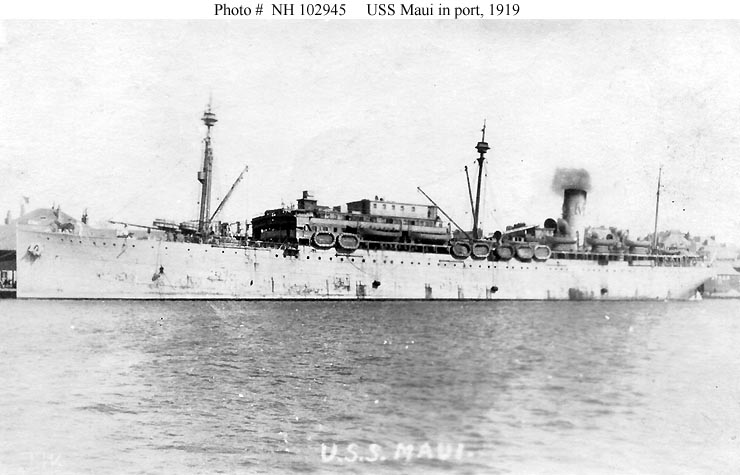
USS Maui in 1919.

As a Naval transport Maui transported United States Army troops and cargo to Europe on her outbound voyages and brought passengers and sick and wounded military personnel back to the United States on her return voyages until the end of the war in November 1918. After the war, she conducted voyages to bring American troops back to the United States for demobilization.

The U.S. Navy commissioned Maui on 6 March 1918 as the troop transport USS Maui (ID-1514), assigned to the Cruiser and Transport Force, under the command of Lieutenant Commander W. F. M. Edwards (USNRF) who had been the ship's commercial captain on her last Hawaiian voyage and had automatically entered Naval service with acquisition of the ship. A number of the Matson officers and crew, also members of the reserve, remained with the ship in Naval service. On 17 March Commander C. A. Abele (USN) assumed command with Edwards becoming the ship's navigator as regular Naval officers reported aboard in preparation for sailing on 2 April and arrival at Army Pier Number 4, Hoboken Port of Embarkation on 4 April where stores and ammunition were loaded in preparation for trials which began on 10 April. On 15 April the first of 478 troops bound for France on the ship's first wartime voyage came aboard with sailing the next day to join a convoy led by USS Seattle but suffered loss of her port engine, found to be failure of the thrust bearing due to blockage in lubricant, and was ordered back to port where another mishap on 21 April cost the life of seaman second class C. F. Conway and near loss of rescuers. With some repair, Maui proceeded to sea later on 21 April and zig zagged unaccompanied using full power on her starboard engine and half on her port engine the ship rejoined the convoy on 28 April bound for Brest, France and completion of her first wartime crossing. By the first anniversary of the ship's commissioning, 6 March 1919, she had made seven round trips to France and was tied up at Army Pier Number 1 at Hoboken. On 3 October Edwards again took command and served throughout the war in that capacity with his rank advanced to Commander 13 May 1919. Maui was in New York when the end of the war came 11 November 1918 and joined in the early morning (New York time) celebration of ship's whistles throughout the harbor.

Maui was one of the first transports with returning troops after the war. Despite orders to sail 24 December, the ship was in New York for Christmas Day, sailing 26 December and celebrating the new year of 1919 at sea headed back to France for more homeward bound troops. She arrived back in New York with harbor craft making a loud welcome and docking to a large Army band celebrating her New York arrival 25 January 1919 with 3,000 troops for demobilization through the New York Port of Embarkation. The next trip, made without cargo, began on 2 February and met a gale on 10 February caused damage to the ship and loss of four men; two overboard and two of injuries in a simultaneous accident in the damaged forecastle that also injured another five men. On 4 May troops of 109th Infantry, an element of the 28th Division, were returned to Philadelphia where the city turned out and a regatta was planned; one disrupted when Maui demonstrated full speed upstream at 17.5 knots (32.4 km/h; 20.1 mph) leaving the welcoming boats behind and arriving an hour early. (Note: Philadelphia in the World War, 1914–1919 on page 744 notes a second visit to the city by Maui on 18 August.) Upon debarking troops Maui returned to Brest for more troops landing them for demobilization through the Newport News Port of Embarkation within twenty days.

For some time the ship had been back under her merchant service officers and crew and by her tenth voyage had transported about 32,000 men to and from France with about 20,000 being men returned home. (Note: The "Log" reference notes that the statistics were compiled before an eleventh trip was made.) In September 1919 and again if February 1920 the ship had faced onboard influenza but in total, including the influenza, lost only four Army men during her transport service.

On 13 September 1919 Maui departed Norfolk, Virginia with a load of government owned coal for San Francisco where she would be decommissioned and returned to Matson upon unloading.

== Post war commercial service ==
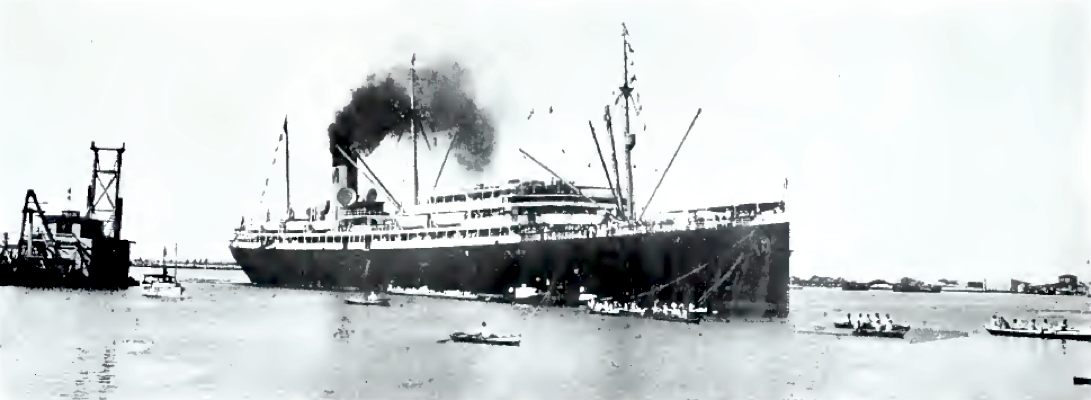
Maui, probably in port at Honolulu ca. 1920.

By January 1920 Maui had been restored to commercial configuration and had made two trips to Hawaii on her regular schedule. After renovation at Bethlehem Shipbuilding's Union Plant the ship departed for Honolulu on 5 May with full cargo and complete list of passengers for the first time since the war.

Due to the difficult economic circumstances prevailing during the Great Depression, she was laid up at San Francisco in 1933. In 1934, Maui was converted into a cargo ship and returned to commercial operations. In November 1941 she was involved in a collision in San Francisco Bay.

== United States Army Transport ==
On 3 December 1941, the United States Army purchased Maui for World War II service, converted her into a troop transport, and placed her in service as the United States Army Transport USAT Maui. Maui was part of a particularly important convoy, Number 2033 escorted by USS New Orleans departing San Francisco on February 12, 1942 and arriving at Brisbane, Australia on March 5. The Convoy transported Army air units, planes and supplies to Australia to reinforce that area against Japanese advances in the Southwest Pacific. She operated in the Pacific Ocean for the remainder of World War II, carrying personnel and cargo to Alaska, the South Pacific, the Southwest Pacific, the Philippines, and, after the end of the war in August 1945, to Japan.

Maui completed her Army service in early 1946 and was transferred to the Maritime Administration for disposal entering the reserve fleet at Olympia, Washington, on 30 August 1946 and totally stripped by 19 September 1947. On 16 January 1948 the ship was sold to Zidell Ship Dismantling Company for $40,000 and scrapped in 1948.

== Bibliography ==
- Hennerich, W. E.; Stewart; Reagor; Kenna; Johnson; Binder (1919). Being the "Log" of the U.S.S. Maui in the World War. New York: Brooklyn Eagle Press.
- Louisiana Planter and Sugar Manufacturer (1917). "Hawaiian Letter". The Louisiana Planter and Sugar Manufacturer. LVIII (June 1917). New Orleans.
- "MAUI". United States Department of Transportation/MARAD. Archived from the original on June 30, 2017.
- Marine Engineering (1920). "Turbo-Reduction Gears in Practice". International Marine Engineering. XXV (July 1920). New York: Aldrich Publishing Company.
- Marine Engineering (1921). "Steamship Manulani Inaugurates New Service". Marine Engineering and Shipping Age. XXVI (September 1921). New York: Aldrich Publishing Company.
- Naval History And Heritage Command. "Maui (SP-1514)". Dictionary of American Naval Fighting Ships. Naval History And Heritage Command.
- "Launch of tke Maui". Pacific Marine Review. 14 (January 1917). San Francisco: J.S. Hines. 1917.
- "The Maui Our Latest Pacific Liner". Pacific Marine Review. 14 (May 1917). San Francisco: J.S. Hines. 1917.
- "The S.S. Maui as a Transport". Pacific Marine Review. 16 (September 1919). San Francisco: J.S. Hines. 1919.
- "San Francisco". Pacific Marine Review. 16 (October 1919). San Francisco: J.S. Hines. 1919.
- "Honolulu". Pacific Marine Review. 17 (January 1920). San Francisco: J.S. Hines. 1920.
- "Pacific Port Notes—San Francisco". Pacific Marine Review. 17 (June 1920). San Francisco: J.S. Hines. 1920.
- Philadelphia. War History Committee (1922). Philadelphia in the World War, 1914-1919. New York: Wynkoop Hallenbeck Crawford Co. p. 45.
- Smith, W. W. (1917). "Description of Geared Turbine Machinery for S. S. Maui". Pacific Marine Review. 14 (March 1917). San Francisco: J.S. Hines.
- Williford, Glen M. (2010). Racing the Sunrise—Reinforcing America's Pacific Outposts 1941–1942. Annapolis, Maryland: Naval Institute Press. ISBN 978-1-59114-956-9. LCCN 2010030455.
