= 80th Fighter Squadron =

US Air Force squadron

80th Fighter Squadron

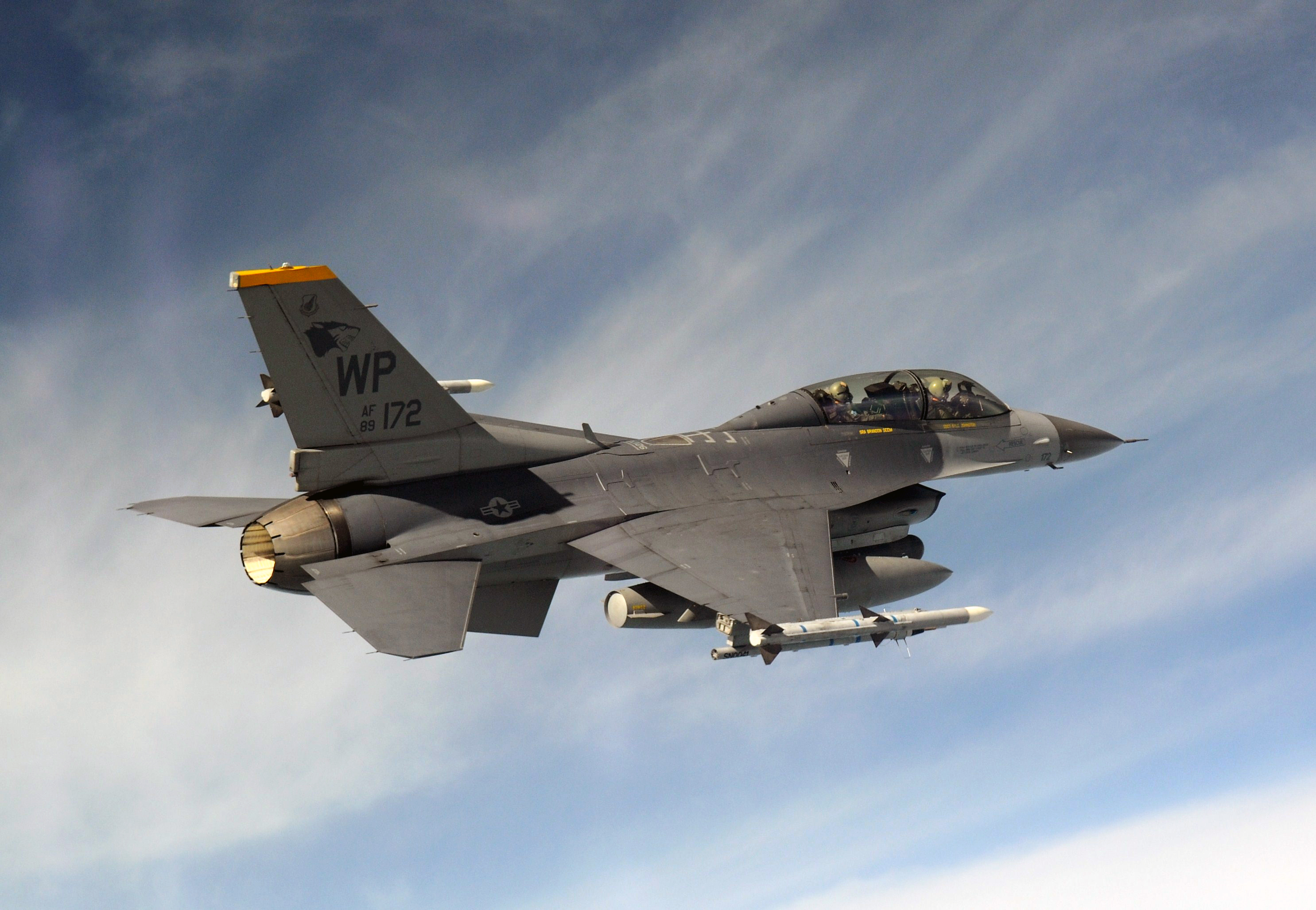
- 80th Fighter Squadron F-16 Fighting Falcon (Note: Aircraft is General Dynamics F-16D Block 40G Fighting Falcon serial 89-172, taken on 21 October 2010.)
- Active: 1942–1945; 1947–present
- Country: United States
- Branch: United States Air Force
- Role: Fighter
- Size: 16 aircraft
- Part of: Pacific Air Forces
- Nickname(s): Headhunters; Juvats
- Motto(s): Audentes Fortuna Juvat (Note: Latin phrase translation.com Literally, "Chance (or luck) helps the audacious," but the squadron traditionally interprets as "Fortune Favors the Bold".)
- Mascot(s): WOODY!!
- Engagements: Southwest Pacific Theater; Korean War; Vietnam War
- Decorations: Distinguished Unit Citation; Air Force Outstanding Unit Award; Philippine Presidential Unit Citation; Republic of Korea Presidential Unit Citation; Republic of Vietnam Gallantry Cross with Palm

Commanders
- Current commander: Lt Col Tyler "Vegas" Young

Insignia
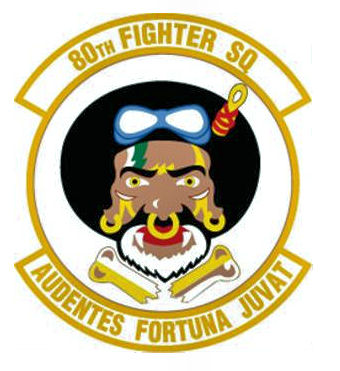
- 80th Fighter Squadron emblem (approved 9 October 1986) (Note: The squadron used unapproved versions of this emblem as early as World War II. Watkins, p. 11.)

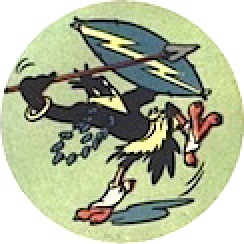
- 80th Fighter Squadron emblem (World War II)

The 80th Fighter Squadron (traditionally nicknamed the "Headhunters", and since 1971 also the "Juvats") is a General Dynamics F-16 Fighting Falcon fighter squadron of the United States Air Force, currently part of the 8th Operations Group of the 8th Fighter Wing, and stationed at Kunsan Air Base, Republic of Korea.

The 80th has served in combat operations in World War II, the Korean War, and the Vietnam War.

== History ==
=== World War II ===
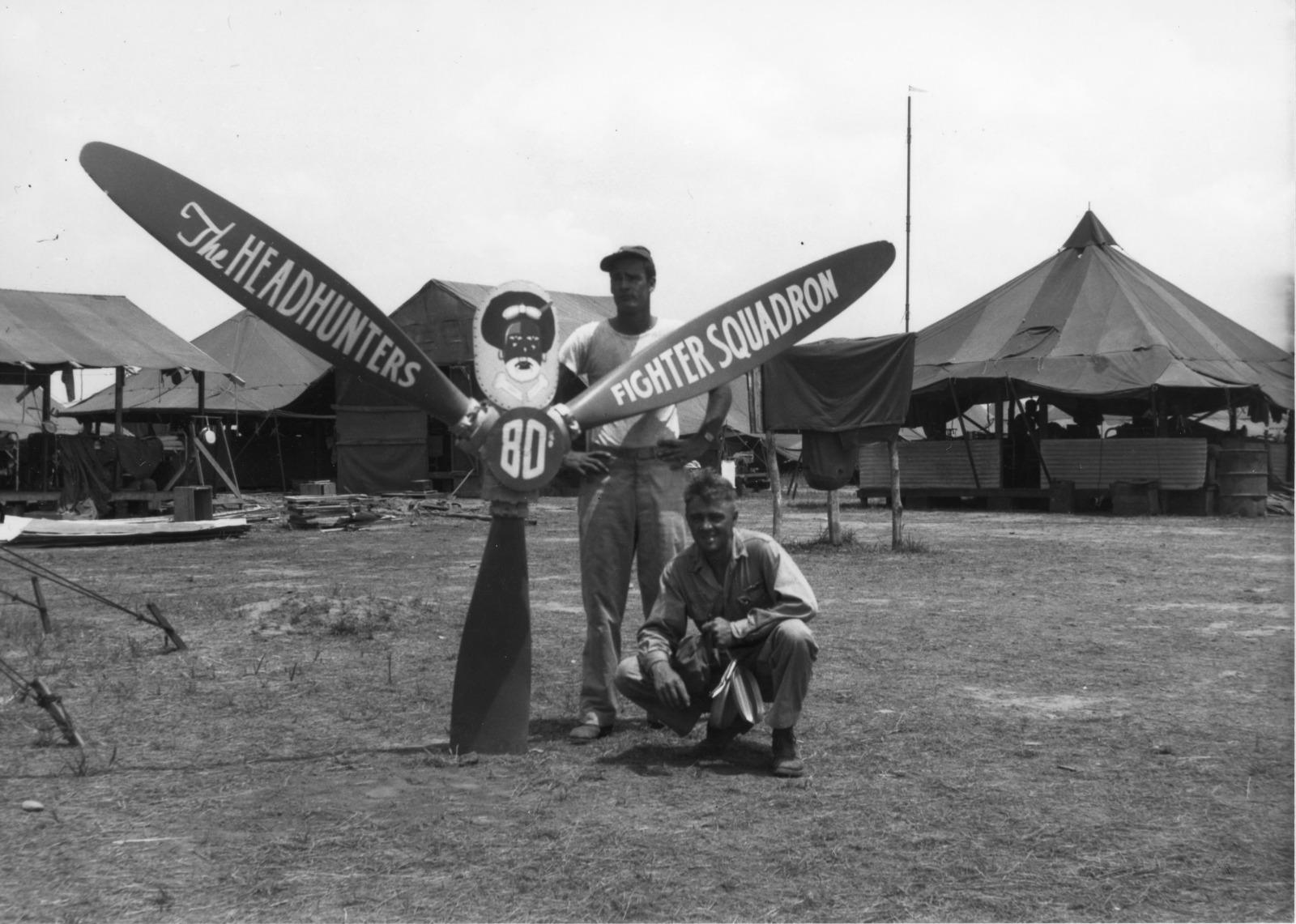
80th Fighter Squad, unknown location

The Headhunters' history began only one month after Pearl Harbor, as the squadron shipped out to fight in the Pacific Theater. The Squadron was first activated on 10 January 1942 at Mitchel Field in New York.

Originally designated as a pursuit squadron, they were redesignated in May 1942 as a fighter squadron. Attached to the 8th Fighter Group. One of the early squadron commanders, Edward "Porky" Cragg named the Squadron "The Headhunters" after the local New Guinean Headhunter tribes who hated the Japanese and helped to rescue downed pilots. He also commissioned a crew chief, M/Sgt. Yale Saffro, who was once offered a job to work for Walt Disney as a cartoonist but turned it down, to design the 80th's patch. (This original patch design can be seen "here"., and has been officially sanctioned by the Office of Air Force Heraldry for current uniform wear.)

The squadron saw action against the Japanese in the Pacific including deployments in Australia, New Guinea, the Schouten Islands, Morotai, Leyte, Mindoro, and Japan.

=== Occupation of Japan and Korean War ===
It was later redesignated as the 80th Fighter Squadron, Single Engine, on 14 January 1947, the squadron reactivated on 20 February 1947 at Itazuke AB, Japan, and was assigned to the 8th Fighter (later, 8th Fighter-Bomber) Group. It would undergo a number of different attachments over the next few years. It was attached to 49th Fighter-Bomber Group from 11 August to 25 September 1950; the 51st Fighter-Interceptor Group from 25 September to 27 October 1950; the Twentieth Air Force from 21 October 1954 to 10 February 1955; the 49th Fighter-Bomber Group from 10 February 1955 to 18 October 1956; and the 8th Fighter-Bomber Wing from 1 February to 30 September 1957).

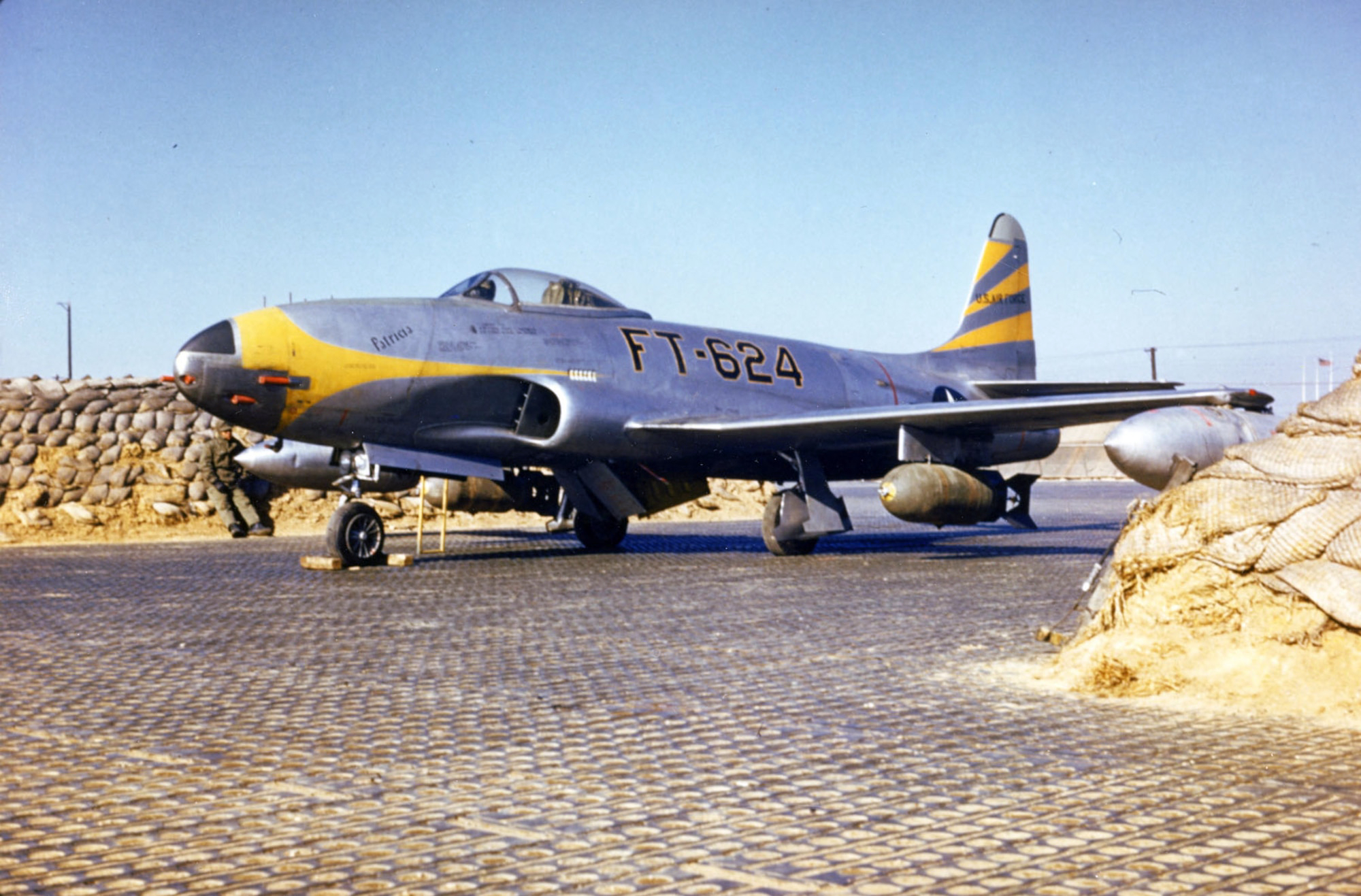
An 80th FBS F-80C in the Korean War.

From 1947 to 1950, the squadron would operate the North American P-51 Mustang, before switching to the Lockheed F-80 Shooting Star in 1950. With their conversion to jet engines, the headhunters were redesignated as the 80th Fighter Squadron, Jet, on 1 January 1950. Later that month, they would become the 80th Fighter-Bomber Squadron. The outfit served in the Korean war in June and July 1953 while mostly flying the North American F-86 Sabre. In 1956, the Headhunters would begin flying the North American F-100 Super Sabre.

Following the squadron's engagement in the Korean War, the 80th was tasked with providing air defense in Japan and Korea (1953–1954), in Okinawa (1954–1956), and in Japan and Korea (1956–1971).

=== Vietnam War ===
In 1963, the squadron began flying the Republic F-105 Thunderchief. In June 1964, they were attached to the 41st Air Division. They remained with the 41st for less than a year, moving to the 6441st Tactical Fighter Wing of the 2d Air Division in April 1965. The squadron conducted temporary duty combat operations in Southeast Asia from December 1964 to June 1965. During the conflict, the squadron were attacked targets such as the Thái Nguyên Steel Plant, Haiphong storage facilities, rail lines, and the Paul Doumer Bridge.

During their time serving in the Vietnam War, the 80th conducted 7,384 combat missions in Southeast Asia, including 2,657 combat missions directly over North Vietnam, for a total of 17,104 total hours of active operations. For their role in the conflict, 80th pilots received 7 Silver Stars, 64 Distinguished Flying Crosses, and 426 Air Medals. The 80th earned one battle honor, the Republic of Vietnam Gallantry Cross (with Palm), and four Air Force Outstanding Unit Citations.

=== Return to Japan ===
In the winter of 1967–1968, now assigned to the 347th Tactical Fighter Wing, the 80th began transition to the McDonnell F-4C Phantom II. In January 1968 its few available aircrews and aircraft (most of its F-105 assets were in the process of augmenting units in Thailand and the F-4Cs at Yokota were not yet operational) were sent to Korea in reaction to the North Korean seizure of the USS Pueblo (AGER-2). During the summer of 1968 the 80th TFS became the first PACAF squadron to assign a contingent of experienced F-4 aircraft commanders and electronic warfare officers (EWOs) as F-4C Wild Weasel crews. The first fully modified F-4C Wild Weasel aircraft arrived in April 1969.

Between 1968 and 1971 the primary mission of the 80th TFS was to deploy on a rotating basis to Osan AB, Korea, providing a nuclear strike alert posture against targets in the Soviet Union, North Korea, and China, maintaining several aircraft on fifteen-minute alert. It also trained on conventional weapons. In 1970 all PACAF F-4 Wild Weasel crews transferred into the 80th TFS.

=== Korean service ===
On 15 February 1971, the 80th TFS redeployed from Yokota to Kunsan AB, Korea, while temporarily assigned to Detachment 1, 475th Tactical Fighter Wing to begin the process of inactivation, with its personnel and aircraft transferred to the 35th TFS. Lt Gen Jay T. Robbins, a former 80th commander and World War II ace who was Vice Commander of Tactical Air Command, rescinded the inactivation and had the 80th transferred to the 3rd Tactical Fighter Wing, in Korea. There it was re-staffed with personnel from the 391st Tactical Fighter Squadron, which was inactivated on 28 February. The 391st's insignia had included the motto Audentes Fortuna Juvat, which subsequently became the "Headhunters" motto. On the 391st sleeve patch, the scroll displaying the motto was such that when the patch was ripped off, the word "Juvat" was left in place. The former 391st aircrew did so with the consent of the 80th commander at the time, Lt Col Soloman Harp III, who named himself the first "Juvat". The motto remained unofficial until approved on 9 October 1986.

In its history, the 80th has recorded 251 total air-to-air victories. The 80th scored one air-to-air victory by an F-105 pilot, but an assigned officer detached at the time to the 13th Tactical Fighter Squadron in Thailand, Captain Jeffrey Feinstein, was credited with five victories and ace status as an F-4 weapons system officer in 1972.

The 80th TFS participated in Operation Paul Bunyan (also known as the tree war) in August -October 1976.

Today, the 80th flies the General Dynamics F-16CM Fighting Falcon and is stationed at Kunsan Air Base, Republic of Korea.

== Lineage ==
- Constituted as the 80 Pursuit Squadron (Interceptor) on 6 January 1942

Activated on 10 January 1942
Redesignated 80 Fighter Squadron on 15 May 1942
Redesignated 80 Fighter Squadron (Twin Engine) 22 July 1943
Redesignated 80 Fighter Squadron, Two Engine on 20 August 1943
Inactivated on 26 December 1945

- Redesignated 80 Fighter Squadron, Single Engine on 14 January 1947

Activated on 20 February 1947
Redesignated 80 Fighter Squadron, Jet on 1 January 1950
Redesignated 80 Fighter-Bomber Squadron on 20 January 1950
Redesignated 80 Tactical Fighter Squadron on 1 July 1958
Redesignated 80 Fighter Squadron on 3 February 1992

=== Assignments ===
- 8th Pursuit Group (later 8th Fighter Group), 10 January 1942 – 26 December 1945
- 8th Fighter Group (later 8th Fighter-Bomber) Group), 20 February 1947

Attached to 49th Fighter-Bomber Group, 11 August–25 September 1950
Attached to 51st Fighter-Interceptor Group, 25 September–27 October 1950
Attached to Twentieth Air Force, 21 October 1954 – 10 February 1955
Attached to 49th Fighter-Bomber Group, 10 February 1955 – 18 October 1956
Attached to: 8th Fighter-Bomber Wing, 1 February–30 September 1957

- 8th Fighter-Bomber Wing (later 8th Tactical Fighter Wing), 1 October 1957

Attached to 41st Air Division, 13 May–17 June 1964

- 41st Air Division, 18 June 1964

Attached to 2d Air Division, 30 October–29 December 1964

- 6441st Tactical Fighter Wing, 1 April 1965

Attached to 2d Air Division, 27 June–26 August 1965

- 41st Air Division, 15 November 1966
- 347th Tactical Fighter Wing, 15 January 1968

Attached to Detachment 1, 475th Tactical Fighter Wing, 15 February – 15 March 1971

- 3d Tactical Fighter Wing, 15 March 1971
- 8 Tactical Fighter Wing, 16 September 1974
- 8 Operations Group, 3 February 1992 – present

=== Stations ===
- Mitchel Field, New York, 10–26 January 1942
- Archerfield Airport, Australia, 6 March 1942
- Lowood Airfield, Australia, 28 March 1942
- Petric, Australia, 10 May 1942
- Kila Airfield, Port Moresby, New Guinea, 20 July 1942
- Gurney Airfield, Milne Bay, New Guinea, 8 November 1942
- Mareeba Airfield, Australia, 6 February 1943
- Kila Airfield, Port Moresby, New Guinea, 21 March 1943
- Girua Airport, New Guinea, 11 December 1943
- Cape Gloucester (Tuluvu) Airfield, Cape Gloucester, New Britain, 28 February 1944
- Nadzab Airfield Complex, New Guinea, 25 March 1944
- Owi Airfield, Schouten Islands, Netherlands East Indies, 18 June 1944
- Wama Airfield, Morotai, Netherlands East Indies, 20 September 1944
- Dulag Airfield, Leyte, Philippines, 15 November 1944 (operated from Wama Airfield, Morotai, Netherlands East Indies until 30 November 1944)
- McGuire Field San Jose, Mindoro, Philippines, 20 December 1944
- Ie Shima Airfield, Ryuku Islands, 5 August 1945
- Fukuoka Air Base, Japan, 25 November – 26 December 1945
- Itazuke Air Base, Japan, 20 February 1947
- Ashiya Air Base, Japan, 14 April 1947
- Itazuke Air Base, Japan, 25 March 1949
- Kimpo Air Base (K-14), South Korea, 27 October 1950
- Itazuke Air Base, Japan, 20 December 1950
- Kimpo Air Base (K-14), South Korea, 25 June 1951
- Suwon Air Base (K-13), South Korea, 24 August 1951
- Kadena Air Base, Okinawa, Ryuku Islands, 21 October 1954
- Itazuke Air Base, Japan, 6 August 1956
- Yokota Air Base, Japan, 13 May 1964

Deployed to Korat Royal Thai Air Force Base, Thailand, 30 October – 29 December 1964
Deployed to Takhli Royal Thai Air Force Base, Thailand], 27 June – 26 August 1965
Deployed to Osan Air Base, South Korea, 26 December 1968 – 20 February 1969; 24 April – 27 May 1969; 5 August – 10 September 1969; 28 November – 27 December 1969; 6 March – 10 April 1970; 29 May – 20 June 1970; 7 August – 4 September 1970; 30 October – 28 November 1970; and 23 January – 15 February 1971

- Kunsan Air Base, South Korea, 15 February 1971 – present

=== Aircraft ===
- Bell P-39 Airacobra, 1942-1943
- Bell P-400, 1942-1943
- Lockheed P-38 Lightning, 1943-1945
- North American P-51 (later F-51) Mustang, 1947-1950
- Lockheed F-80 Shooting Star, 1950-1953
- North American F-86 Sabre, 1953-1957
- Republic F-84 Thunderjet, 1954-1956
- North American F-100 Super Sabre, 1956–1963
- Republic F-105 Thunderchief, 1963-1968
- McDonnell F-4 Phantom II, 1971-1981
- General Dynamics F-16 Fighting Falcon, 1981–present

== See also ==
- USAAF in the Southwest Pacific
