= IRG =

IRG may stand for:

- IATA airport code for Lockhart River Airport
- Ideographic Research Group on coded Han character sets
- Intelligent Robotics Group
- International Resources Group, a professional services firm
- Iranian Revolutionary Guard
- International Ratings Group, a credit ratings agency
- Interest rate guarantee, a financial instrument
- Island Reggae Greats
- Immunity Related Guanosine Triphosphatases (IRGs)

== See also ==
- Satellite IRG, the Satellite Interference Reduction Group
