= 528th Bombardment Squadron =

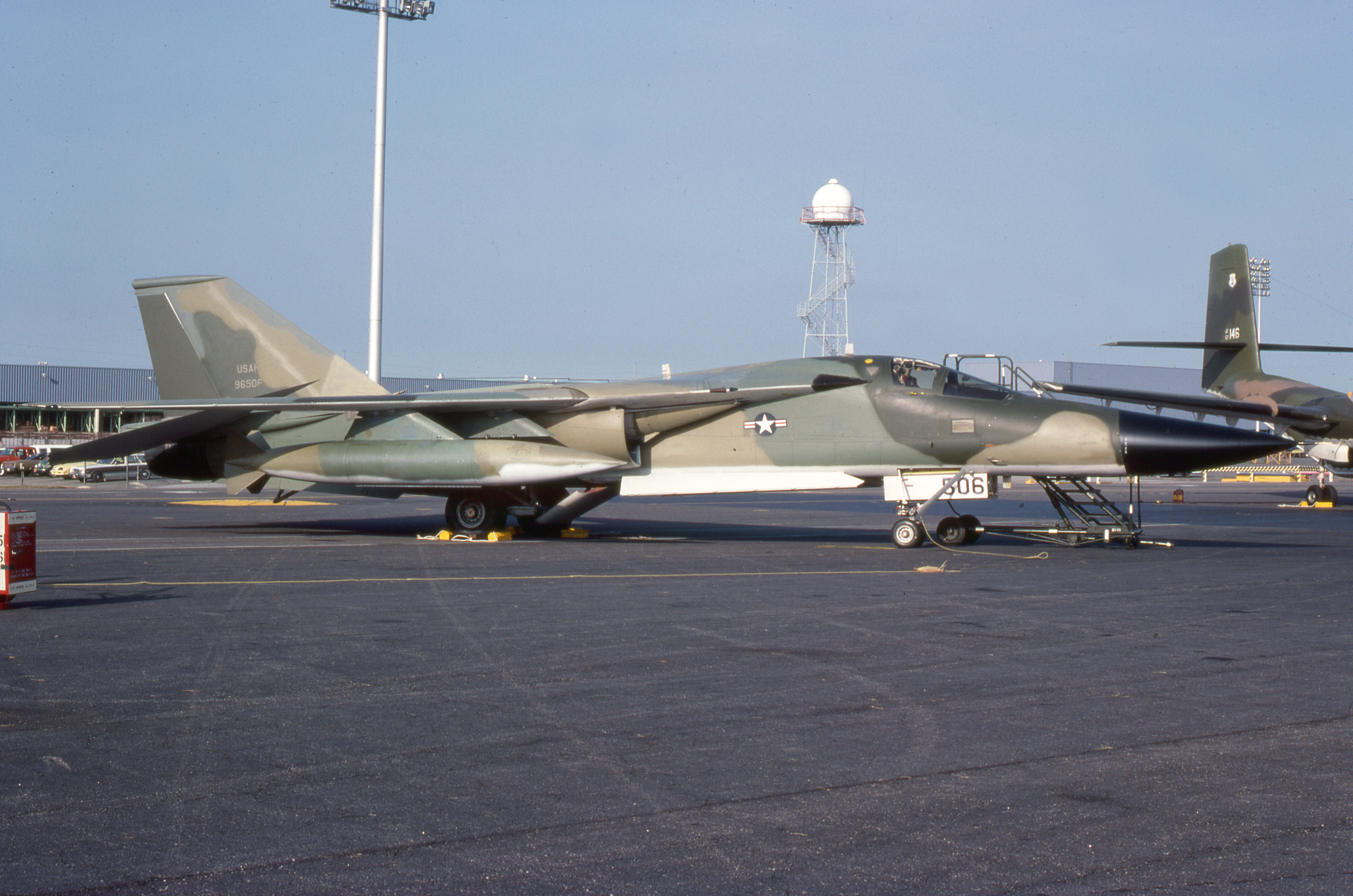
- 380th Bombardment Wing FB-111 at Plattsburgh AFB (Note: Aircraft is General Dynamics FB-111A Aardvark, serial 69-6506. This aircraft was later modified as an F-111G, and was transferred to the Royal Australian Air Force on 18 January 1994. It was scrapped and its fuselage was buried in a landfill in 2011. Baugher, Joe (12 April 2023). "1969 USAF Serial Numbers". Joe Baugher.)
- Active: 1942-1946; 1947–1951; 1955-1991
- Country: United States
- Branch: United States Air Force
- Role: Medium bomber
- Engagements: Southwest Pacific Theater
- Decorations: Distinguished Unit Citation; Air Force Outstanding Unit Award; Philippine Presidential Unit Citation

Insignia
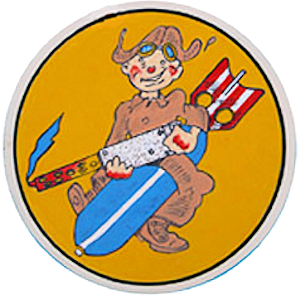
- 528th Bombardment Squadron emblem (Note: Approved 5 May 1943. Description: On a golden orange disc thin border black, a caricatured figure with brown flight suit and aviator's helmet, riding a blue aerial bomb with red and white bands on tail fins, falling to dexter base, and carrying a machine gun gray with perforated cooling jacket, emitting blue smoke from the barrel.)

The 528th Bombardment Squadron is an inactive United States Air Force unit. It was last assigned to the 380th Bombardment Wing at Plattsburgh Air Force Base, New York, where it was inactivated on 1 July 1991.

The squadron was first activated during World War II. After training as a heavy bomber unit in the United States, it moved to the Southwest Pacific Theater, entering combat in May 1943, flying combat missions from Australia while attached to the Royal Australian Air Force, earning two Distinguished Unit Citations and a Philippine Presidential Unit Citation. In 1945 it moved forward to the Philippines, then to Okinawa. Following V-J Day, the squadron returned to the Philippines and was inactivated there in February 1946.

The squadron was activated in the reserves in 1947, becoming a corollary unit in 1949. The squadron was called to active service in May 1951 for the Korean War and its personnel used to fill out other units.

The squadron was activated at Plattsburgh in July 1955 as a Strategic Air Command bomber unit. At Plattsburgh, it successively flew Boeing B-47 Stratojets, Boeing B-52 Stratofortresses and General Dynamics FB-111 Aardvarks until inactivating when its planes were transferred to Tactical Air Command and modified for conventional operations.

== History ==
=== World War II ===
The squadron was activated at Davis-Monthan Field, Arizona on 3 November 1942 as one of the four original squadrons of the 380th Bombardment Group. After training with Consolidated B-24 Liberators, the squadron moved to the Southwest Pacific Theater in April 1943.

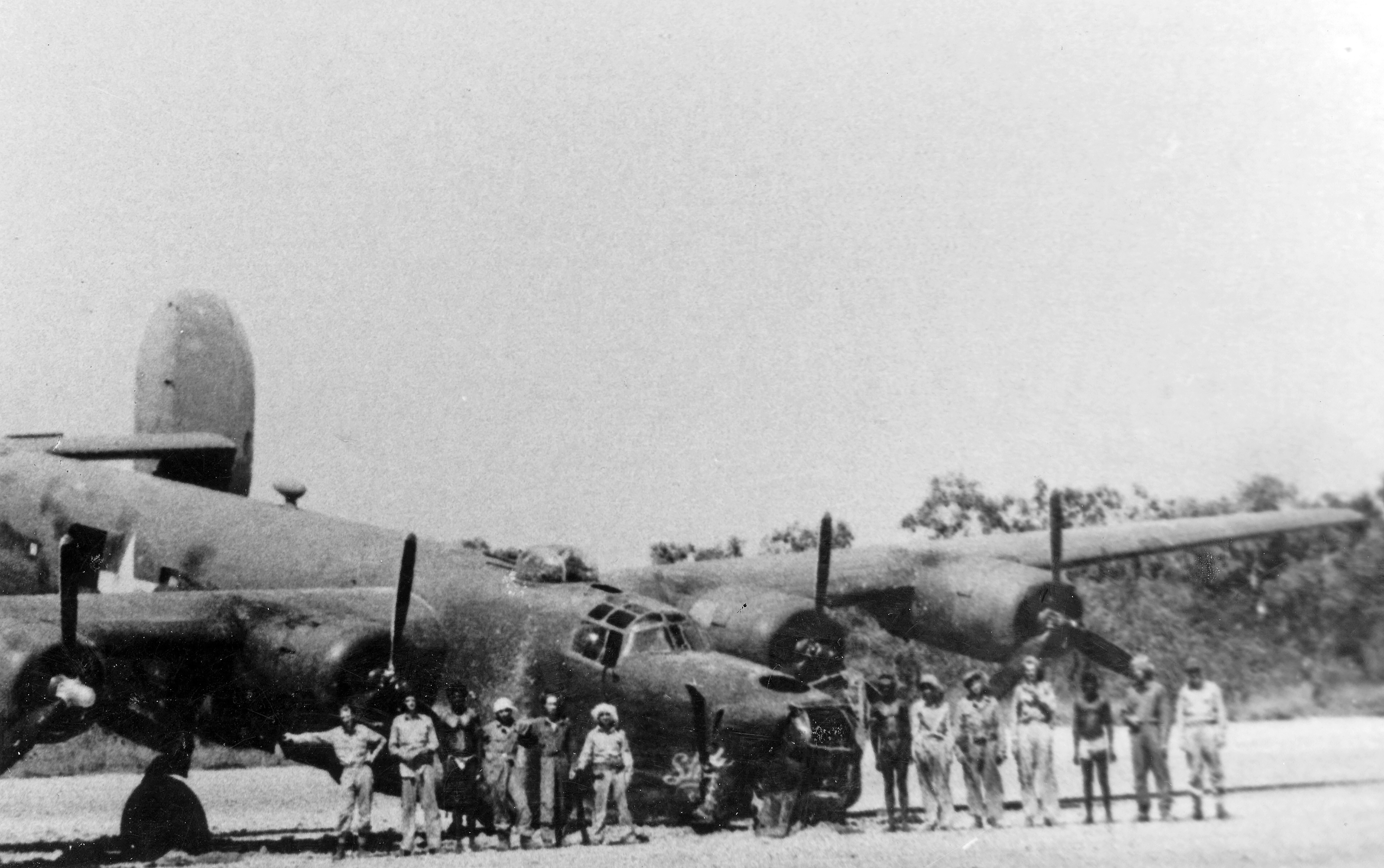
Squadron B-24 after crash landing in Northern Australia after a raid on Balikpapan

The air echelon arrived at Fenton Airfield in the Australian Northern Territory by the end of April. The ground echelon started out from Darwin, Australia by truck. For the remainder of its stay in Australia, the squadron and the rest of the 380th Group would be attached to the Royal Australian Air Force (RAAF). It trained RAAF crews on the operation of the Liberator. Its initial combat operations were in May, when it flew armed reconnaissance missions.

From its home at Fenton, the 528th attacked Japanese installations in the Netherlands East Indies and the Bismark Archipelago, including airfields, ground installations and factories. In August 1943, it participated in a series of raids on oil refineries in Balikpapan, Borneo in what at the time was the longest bombing mission flown by an Army Air Forces bomber unit. For this mission, the squadron was awarded the Distinguished Unit Citation (DUC). During April and May 1944, the unit conducted a series of raids on enemy airfields in western New Guinea to support landings in the Hollandia area, for which it was awarded a second DUC.

On 23 April 1944, on a bombing run over Noemfoor Island, five aircraft of the 528th participated in the wildest shooting spree of the war for the squadron. They were intercepted by twenty-five Japanese fighters and a very hot battle ensued for the next hour. The squadron claimed twelve of the enemy fighters destroyed. All five of the Liberators managed to make it back to Fenton, although heavily damaged. The squadron was not without losses though, one deadly and six wounded. This battle resulted in 21 Distinguished Flying Crosses and 10 Silver Stars being awarded to members of the 528th.

The squadron was relieved from attachment to the RAAF and moved to the Philippines in February 1945. Operating from Mindoro, the squadron provided air support for ground forces on Luzon, and attacked industrial targets in Formosa, ground installations along the China coast and transportation targets in French Indochina. It also continued its attacks on refineries in Borneo. In August 1945, the squadron moved to Okinawa. Following V-J Day, the squadron flew reconnaissance missions over Japan and flew prisoners of war from Japan to Manila. The squadron became nonoperational and moved to Fort William McKinley in November 1945. It was inactivated there in February 1946.

=== Air Force Reserves ===
The squadron was activated in the reserves at MacDill Field, Florida, where its training was supervised by the 465th AAF Base Unit (later the 2582d Air Force Reserve Training Center) of Air Defense Command (ADC). It is not clear whether or not the squadron was fully staffed or equipped at this time. In 1948 Continental Air Command assumed responsibility for managing reserve and Air National Guard units from ADC.

The May 1949 Air Force Reserve program called for a new type of unit, the corollary unit, which was a reserve unit integrated with an active duty unit. The plan was viewed as the best method to train reservists by mixing them with an existing regular unit to perform duties alongside the regular unit. The squadron became a corollary of the 307th Bombardment Wing and Strategic Air Command became responsible for its training. All reserve corollary units were mobilized for the Korean war, and the squadron was called to active duty in May 1951. Its personnel were used to bring other units up to strength, and the squadron was inactivated two weeks later.

=== Strategic Air Command ===
==== B-47 era ====
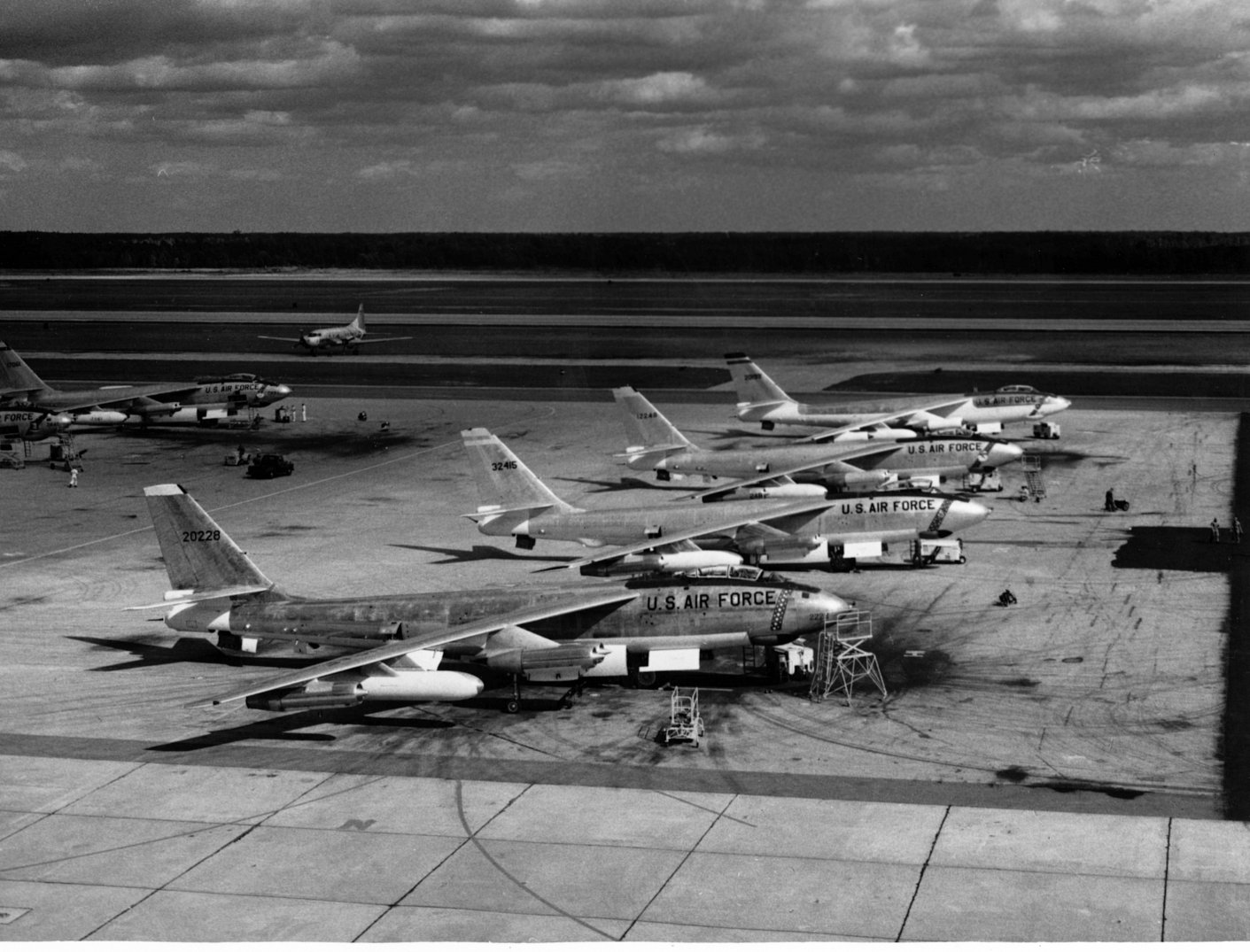
SAC B-47Es

The squadron was again activated at Plattsburgh Air Force Base, New York in July 1955 as part of the 380th Bombardment Wing and equipped with Boeing B-47 Stratojets. Although activated on the 11th, the squadron did not begin to be operational until the end of the month. Substantial work was ongoing to make Plattsburgh operational, and in the first half of 1956, most training was conducted through a detachment of the 380th Wing located at another B-47 base, Pinecastle Air Force Base, Florida. From 3 April 1957 to 3 July 1957, the squadron deployed to RAF Brize Norton on Operation Reflex. Reflex placed Stratojets and Boeing KC-97s at bases closer to the Soviet Union for 90 day periods, although individuals rotated back to home bases during unit Reflex deployments The percentage of SAC planes on fifteen minute ground alert, fully fueled and ready for combat to reduce vulnerability to a Soviet missile strike gradually grew over the next three years to reach the goal of 1/3 of SAC's force on alert by 1960.

From 1958, the Stratojet wings of SAC began to assume an alert posture at their home bases, reducing the amount of time spent on alert at overseas bases. The alert commitment was increased to half the squadron's aircraft in 1962.

After the detection of Soviet missiles in Cuba, SAC dispersed its B-47s on 22 October 1962. Most dispersal bases were civilian airfields with AF Reserve or Air National Guard units. Squadron B-47s were configured for execution of the Emergency War Order as soon as possible after dispersal. On 24 October 1962, SAC went to DEFCON 2, placing all its combat aircraft on alert. As tensions eased, on 15 November 1/6 of the dispersed B-47s were recalled to their home bases. On 21 November, SAC went to DEFCON 3. Dispersed B-47s and supporting tankers were recalled on 24 November. On 27 November the squadron returned to its normal alert posture.

==== B-52 era ====
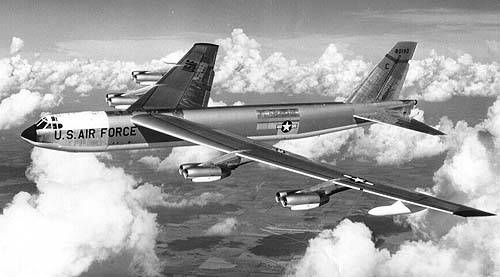
B-52G in flight

The squadron flew the B-47 Until 1965, when the medium bomber began to be phased out of SAC's inventory. Ground alert for B-47s was terminated on 11 February 1966. The squadron began to send its Stratojets to the Aerospace Maintenance and Regeneration Center at Davis-Monthan Air Force Base for retirement. It began receiving Boeing B-52G Stratofortresses in June 1966, receiving its aircraft from the inactivating 70th Bombardment Squadron at Loring Air Force Base, Maine. It trained in strategic bombardment missions, and stood ground alert with its Stratofortresses.

SAC planners established methods to protect their forces in addition to the ground alert program. With its B-52s, SAC maintained an airborne force for "airborne alert training under Operation Chrome Dome." On 21 January 1968, a squadron B-52 was flying an airborne alert mission near Thule Air Base, Greenland. Six hours into the flight, the aircraft declared an emergency with a fire on board and sought to make an emergency landing at Thule. As its situation grew worse, the aircraft commander determined he would not be able to make a safe landing and directed the crew to bail out when the plane was over the base. The bomber crashed on sea ice and the high explosives in its four Mark 28FI nuclear weapons detonated, spreading radioactive material over a large area.

Chrome Dome operations ended shortly after the crash. Although the Thule incident and the 1966 Palomares B-52 crash contributed to the end of Chrome Dome, its costs were rising at an alarming rate and the advent of a survivable intercontinental ballistic missile force made bombers available for more time sensitive operations. The squadron continued to fly the B-52 until January 1971.

==== FB-111 era ====
In 1969, it was announced that the 528th would be receiving the General Dynamics FB-111A Aardvark medium bomber. As its B-52s departed in 1971, the squadron became combat ready with the FB-111 in July. At the annual SAC bombing and navigation competition in 1974 a 528th crew won top honors and helped to bring the Fairchild Trophy to the 380th Wing. In 1975, another 528th team took the best crew award. With three of the four 380th crews coming from the squadron, an unprecedented second consecutive Fairchild Trophy was won in 1976. The 528th was recognized as the best bombardment squadron in SAC in 1976 and earned the Air Force Outstanding Unit Award in 1978..

In 1991, the squadron began transferring its aircraft to be modified as F-111G fighter-bombers. With the exception of museum aircraft, the last FB-111 was gone by July 1991, and the squadron was inactivated.

== Lineage ==
- Constituted as the 528th Bombardment Squadron (Heavy) on 28 October 1942

Activated on 3 November 1942
Redesignated 528th Bombardment Squadron, Heavy on 26 August 1944
Inactivated on 20 February 1946
Redesignated 528th Bombardment Squadron, Very Heavy on 13 May 1947
Activated in the reserve on 29 May 1947
Redesignated 528th Bombardment Squadron, Medium on 26 June 1949
Ordered to active service on 1 May 1951
Inactivated on 16 May 1951
Activated on 11 July 1955
Redesignated 528th Bombardment Squadron, Heavy on 25 June 1966
Redesignated 528th Bombardment Squadron, Medium on 1 January 1971
Inactivated on 1 July 1991

=== Assignments ===
- 380th Bombardment Group, 3 November 1942 – 20 February 1946
- Fourteenth Air Force, 29 May 1947
- 380th Bombardment Group, 16 June 1947 – 16 May 1951
- 380th Bombardment Wing, 11 July 1955 – 1 July 1991

=== Stations ===
- Davis-Monthan Field, Arizona, 3 November 1942
- Biggs Field, Texas, 2 December 1942
- Lowry Field, Colorado, 4 March-19 April 1943
- Fenton Airfield, Australia, 28 April 1943
- RAAF Base Darwin, Australia, c. 20 August 1944
- San Jose, Mindoro, Philippines, c. 21 February 1945
- Motobu Airfield, Okinawa, 8 August 1945
- Fort William McKinley, Luzon, Philippines, c. 28 November 1945 – 20 February 1946
- MacDill Field (later MacDill Air Force Base), Florida, 29 May 1947 – 16 May 1951
- Plattsburgh Air Force Base, New York, 11 July 1955 – 1 July 1991

=== Aircraft ===
- Consolidated B-24 Liberator, 1942–1945
- Boeing B-29 Superfortress, 1949–1951
- Boeing B-47 Stratojet, 1955–1965
- Boeing B-52 Stratofortress, 1966–1971
- General Dynamics FB-111A Aardvark, 1971–1991

=== Awards and campaigns ===
Award streamer	Award	Dates	Notes
	Distinguished Unit Citation	13, 14, 17 August 1943	Borneo
	Distinguished Unit Citation	20 April 1944-17 May 1944	New Guinea
	Air Force Outstanding Unit Award	1 July 1974-30 June 1975	
	Air Force Outstanding Unit Award	1 July 1976-30 June 1977	
	Air Force Outstanding Unit Award	1 July 1979-30 June 1980	
	Air Force Outstanding Unit Award	1 July 1980-30 June 1981	
	Air Force Outstanding Unit Award	1 July 1983-30 June 1985	
	Air Force Outstanding Unit Award	1 July 1985-30 June 1987	
	Philippine Republic Presidential Unit Citation	21 February 1945-4 July 1945	

Campaign Streamer	Campaign	Dates	Notes
	Air Offensive, Japan	28 April 1943 – 2 September 1945	
	New Guinea	28 April 1943 – 31 December 1944	
	Bismarck Archipelago	15 December 1943 – 27 November 1944	
	Luzon	15 December 1944 – 4 July 1945	
	China Defensive	21 February 1945 – 4 May 1945	
	Southern Philippines	27 February 1945 – 4 July 1945	
	China Offensive	5 May 1945 – 2 September 1945	
	Western Pacific	17 April 1945 – 2 September 1945	

== See also ==
- United States Army Air Forces in Australia
- List of B-52 Units of the United States Air Force
- List of B-47 units of the United States Air Force
- List of B-29 Superfortress operators
- B-24 Liberator units of the United States Army Air Forces
