= 403d Bombardment Squadron =

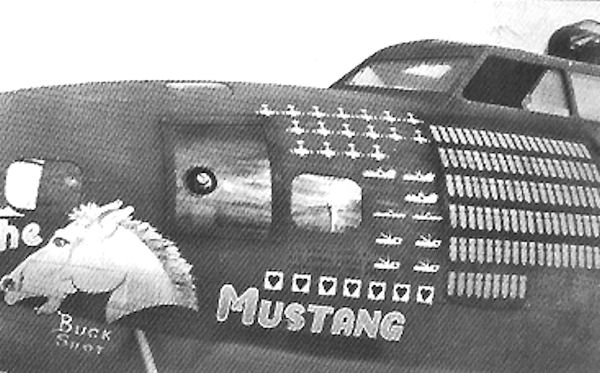
- 403d Squadron B-17F Flying Fortress, Mustang (Note: Aircraft is Boeing B-17F Flying Fortress, serial 41-24554, Mustang. It flew with the squadron in Australia and New Guinea. It returned to the United States as "War-Weary" in November 1943, where it was assigned to a Replacement Training Unit. It was sold for scrap in July 1946. The mission markers, Purple Hearts and other markings shown in the photo were applied in Depot when the plane was returning to the US and do not accurately depict the aircraft's experience in combat. Baugher, Joe (26 December 2022). "1941 USAF Serial Numbers". Joe Baugher.)
- Active: 1941–1946; 1958–1960; 1960–1961
- Country: United States
- Branch: United States Air Force
- Role: Bombardment
- Engagements: Southwest Pacific Theater
- Decorations: Distinguished Unit Citation; Philippine Presidential Unit Citation

Insignia
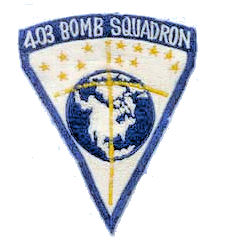
- Patch with 403d Bombardment Squadron emblem (Note: Approved 31 July 1959. Description: On a silver-gray sector of a circle, point down, within an Air Force blue border, an Air Force blue globe, land areas white, below the constellations Cassiopeia in dexter chief and the Big Dipper in sinister chief, Air Force golden yellow, over all two radar crosshairs Air Force golden yellow.)

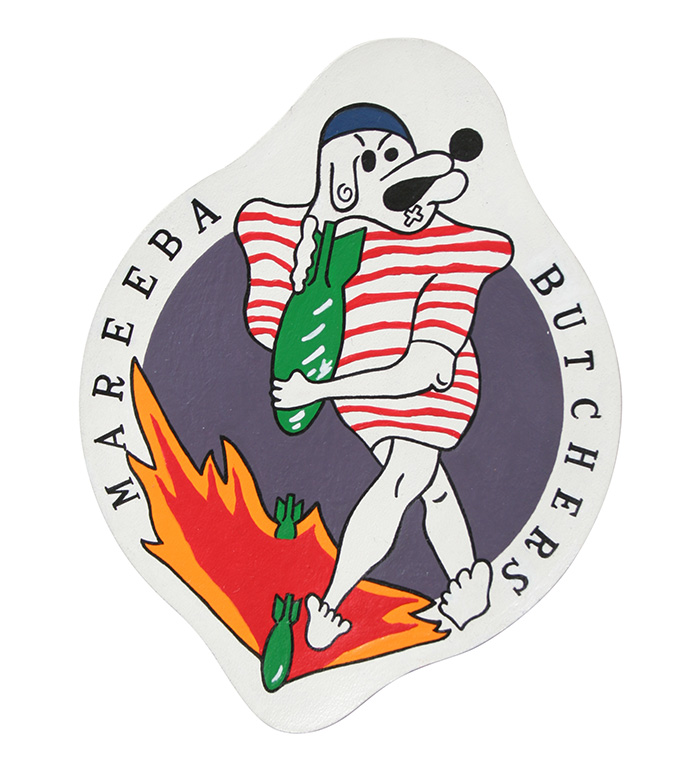
- 403d Bombardment Squadron emblem (World War II)

The 403d Bombardment Squadron is an inactive United States Air Force unit. It was last assigned to the 43rd Bombardment Wing at Carswell Air Force Base, Texas, where it was inactivated on 1 January 1961.

The squadron was first activated in January 1941 as the 13th Reconnaissance Squadron, one of the original squadrons of the 43rd Bombardment Group. Following the Attack on Pearl Harbor, the squadron participated in antisubmarine patrols until January 1942, when it moved to Australia and the Southwest Pacific Theater. Shortly after it arrived in Australia, the squadron was redesignated the 403d Bombardment Squadron. It moved forward with US forces through New Guinea and the Philippines, moving to Ie Shima shortly before V-J Day for operations against Japan. It earned a Distinguished Unit Citation and a Philippine Presidential Unit Citation for combat operations. The squadron was inactivated in the Philippines in April 1946.

The squadron was reactivated as a Strategic Air Command Boeing B-47 Stratojet unit in Arizona from 1958 to 1960. It was activated again at Carswell in 1960 to begin conversion to the Convair B-58 Hustler, but was inactivated before becoming operational.

== History ==
=== World War II ===
==== Initial organization and training ====
The squadron was first activated at Langley Field, Virginia as the 13th Reconnaissance Squadron, one of the original four squadrons of the 43d Bombardment Group, in the buildup of the United States military forces prior to the American entry into World War II. Since a reorganization of General Headquarters Air Force in September 1936, each bombardment group of the Army Air Forces (AAF) had an assigned or attached reconnaissance squadron, which operated the same aircraft as that group's assigned bombardment squadrons. It was equipped with a variety of aircraft, not only the Boeing B-17 Flying Fortress that it would fly in combat, but also Douglas B-18 Bolos and Lockheed A-29 Hudsons. The squadron moved to Army Air Base Bangor, Maine at the end of August. Following the Japanese attack on Pearl Harbor, the squadron conducted antisubmarine patrols off the Atlantic coast, primarily with its Bolos and Hudsons until January 1942, when it began moving to reinforce American forces in the Southwest Pacific Theater.

==== Combat in the Pacific ====
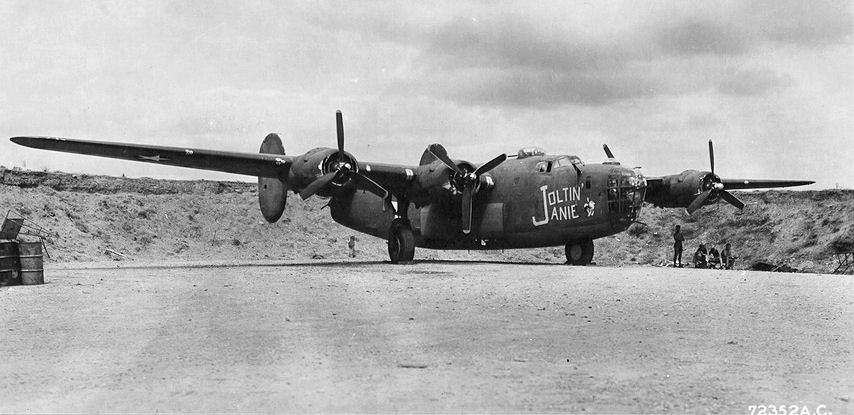
B-24D Liberator, Joltin' Janie at Dobodura (Note: Aircraft is Consolidated B-24D-30-CO Liberator, serial 42-40065. Shown parked in a revetment at Dobodura Airfield on Papua, New Guinea on 11 June 1943. This aircraft was lost on 9 September 1943, when it ditched in Bootless Inlet, New Guinea after take-off on a training flight for a co-pilot transitioning to the B-24 from the Boeing B-17 Flying Fortress. Baugher, Joe (28 December 2021). "1942 USAF Serial Numbers". Joe Baugher.)

The squadron reached Australia via Cape Town in February 1942, the first of the 43d Group's four squadrons to arrive in the theater. (Note: The other three squadrons arrived in mid to late March. Maurer, Combat Squadrons, pp. 241, 243-244, 245-246.) In April 1942, the Army Air Forces (AAF) ended its practice of assigning or attaching reconnaissance squadrons to medium and heavy bombardment groups, and the squadron became the 403d Bombardment Squadron. It was originally equipped with B-17s for combat operations. It was not until September 1942 that the squadron reached an operational complement of aircraft and personnel.

The squadron operated from bases in Australia until November 1942, when it moved to New Guinea. Between May and September 1942 the squadron replaced its B-17s with Consolidated B-24 Liberators, believed to be more suited to the long ranges of many Pacific missions. It returned to Australia from January to May 1943, when it resumed operations from New Guinea, attacking Japanese shipping in the Netherlands East Indies and the Bismarck Archipelago. It experimented with skip bombing. It used this technique during the Battle of the Bismarck Sea in March 1943. During this battle, it made repeated attacks against an enemy convoy bringing reinforcements to Japanese forces in New Guinea. For this action, the squadron was awarded a Distinguished Unit Citation. During this period, the squadron also provided air support for ground forces in New Guinea. It attacked airfields and enemy installations in New Guinea, the Bismarck Archipelago, Celebes, Halmahera, Yap, Palau, and the southern Philippines.

In November 1944 the squadron moved to the Philippines, helping the ground campaign on Luzon as well as conducting bombing missions against airfields, industrial installations and enemy installations in China and Formosa. In July 1945 it moved to Ie Shima Airfield, from which it flew missions over Japan, attacking railroads and airfields, as well as shipping in the Seto Inland Sea until V-J Day. After ceasing operations, the squadron sent its aircraft to the Philippines for reclamation and relocated to Fort William McKinley as a paper unit. It was finally inactivated in April 1946.

=== Strategic Air Command ===
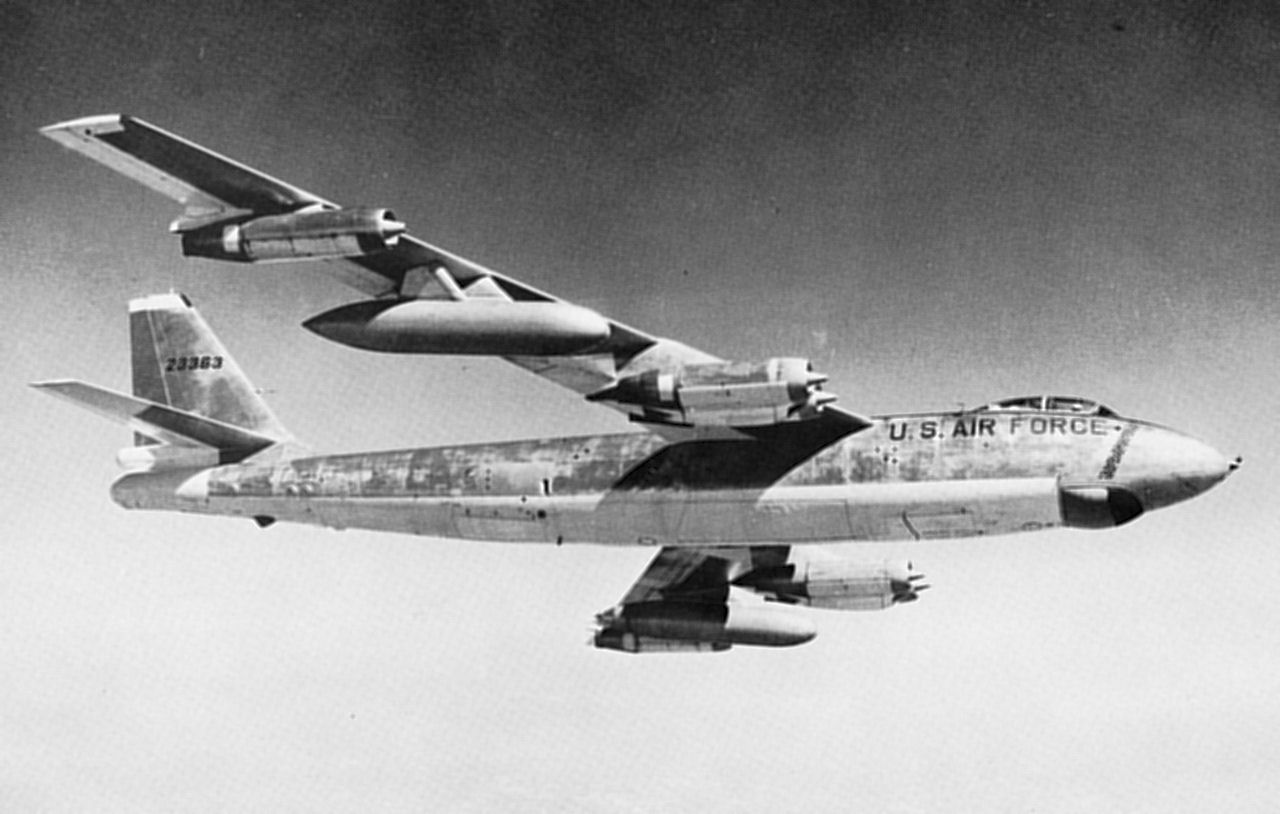
B-47E Stratojet (Note: Aircraft is Lockheed built Boeing B-47E-50-LM Stratojet, serial 52-3363. This plane went to the Military Aircraft Storage and Disposal Center on 13 June 1963, and was scrapped on 30 October 1967.)

From 1958, the Boeing B-47 Stratojet wings of Strategic Air Command (SAC) began to assume an alert posture at their home bases, reducing the time spent on alert at overseas bases. The SAC alert cycle divided itself into four parts: planning, flying, alert and rest to meet General Thomas S. Power’s initial goal of maintaining one third of SAC’s planes on fifteen minute ground alert, fully fueled and ready for combat to reduce vulnerability to a Soviet missile strike. To implement this new system B-47 wings reorganized from three to four squadrons. The 403d was activated at Davis-Monthan Air Force Base as the fourth squadron of the 43d Bombardment Wing. In March 1960, the 43rd Wing moved to Carswell Air Force Base, Texas to become the Air Force's first Convair B-58 Hustler wing, and the squadron was discontinued. Two months later, on 15 May, he squadron was organized at Carswell, but it was inactivated on 1 January 1961, before becoming operational.

== Lineage ==
- Constituted as the 13th Reconnaissance Squadron (Heavy) on 20 November 1940

Activated on 15 January 1941
Redesignated 403d Bombardment Squadron (Heavy) on 22 April 1942
Redesignated 403d Bombardment Squadron, Heavy on 21 September 1943
Inactivated on 29 April 1946
Redesignated 403d Bombardment Squadron, Medium on 20 August 1958
Activated on 1 December 1958
Discontinued on 15 March 1960
Organized on 15 May 1960
Discontinued and inactivated on 1 January 1961

=== Assignments ===
- 43rd Bombardment Group, 15 January 1941 – 29 April 1946 (Note: It is not clear if the squadron was assigned or attached to the group prior to early 1942. Maurer, Combat Squadrons and the Air Force Historical Research Agency factsheet for the 43 Air Mobility Group both state the squadron was assigned from the date of activation. Maurer, Combat Squadrons, p. 493. However, Maurer, Combat Units does not list the 13th Squadron as a component and dates the assignment of the 403d as starting in 1942. Maurer, Combat Units, pp. 99-101 Most reconnaissance squadrons were only attached to bombardment groups prior to 1942. Maurer (1987), p. 340.)
- 43rd Bombardment Wing, 1 December 1958 – 15 March 1960
- Strategic Air Command, 12 April 1960 (not organized)
- 43rd Bombardment Wing, 15 May 1960 – 1 January 1961

=== Stations ===
- Langley Field, Virginia, 15 January 1941
- Army Air Base, Bangor, Maine, 30 August 1941 – 18 January 1942
- Essendon Airport,Melbourne, Victoria, Australia, 27 February 1942
- RAAF Laverton, Victoria, Australia, 14 March 1942
- Longreach Airport, Torrens Creek, Queensland, Australia, 27 August 1942
- Iron Range Airfield, Queensland, Australia, c. 17 October 1942
- Gurney Airfield, Milne Bay, Papua New Guinea, 23 November 1942
- Mareeba Airfield, Queensland, Australia, c. 21 January 1943
- Jackson Airfield, Port Moresby, Papua New Guinea, c. 11 May 1943
- Dobodura Airfield, Papua New Guinea, c. 13 December 1943
- Nadzab Airfield, Papua New Guinea, 12 March 1944
- Owi Airfield, Schouten Islands, Netherlands East Indies, 28 July 1944
- Tacloban Airfield, Leyte, Philippines, C. 19 November 1944
- Clark Field, Luzon, Philippines, c. 15 March 1945
- Ie Shima Airfield, Okinawa, Ryuku Islands, 22 July 1945
- Fort William McKinley, Luzon, Philippines, 11 December 1945 – 29 April 1946
- Davis-Monthan Air Force Base, Arizona, 1 December 1958 – 15 March 1960
- Carswell Air Force Base, Texas, 15 May 1960 – 1 January 1961

=== Aircraft ===
- Boeing B-17 Flying Fortress, 1941, 1942–1943
- Douglas B-18 Bolo, 1941–1942
- Lockheed A-29 Hudson, 1941–1942
- Consolidated B-24 Liberator, 1942–1945
- Boeing B-47 Stratojet, 1958–1960
- Convair B-58 Hustler, 1960

=== Awards and campaigns ===
Award streamer	Award	Dates	Notes
	Distinguished Unit Citation	2 October 1942 – 23 January 1943	Papua New Guinea 403d Bombardment Squadron
	Distinguished Unit Citation	2-4 March 1943	Bismarck Sea 403d Bombardment Squadron
	Philippine Republic Presidential Unit Citation	17 October 44 – 4 July 45	403d Bombardment Squadron

Campaign Streamer	Campaign	Dates	Notes
	Air Offensive, Japan	17 April 1942 – 2 September 1945	403d Bombardment Squadron
	China Defensive	4 July 1942 – 4 May 1945	403d Bombardment Squadron
	Papua	23 July 1942 – 23 January 1943	403d Bombardment Squadron
	New Guinea	24 January 1943 – 31 December 1944	403d Bombardment Squadron
	Northern Solomons	23 February 1943 – 21 November 1944	403d Bombardment Squadron
	Bismarck Archipelago	15 December 1943 – 27 November 1944	403d Bombardment Squadron
	Leyte	17 October 1944 – 1 July 1945	403d Bombardment Squadron
	Luzon	15 December 1944 – 4 July 1945	403d Bombardment Squadron
	Southern Philippines	27 February 1945 – 4 July 1945	403d Bombardment Squadron
	Western Pacific	17 April 1945 – 2 September 1945	403d Bombardment Squadron
	China Offensive	5 May 1945 – 2 September 1945	403d Bombardment Squadron

== See also ==
- United States Army Air Forces in Australia
- B-17 Flying Fortress units of the United States Army Air Forces
- B-24 Liberator units of the United States Army Air Forces
- List of B-47 units of the United States Air Force
