= 64th Bombardment Squadron =

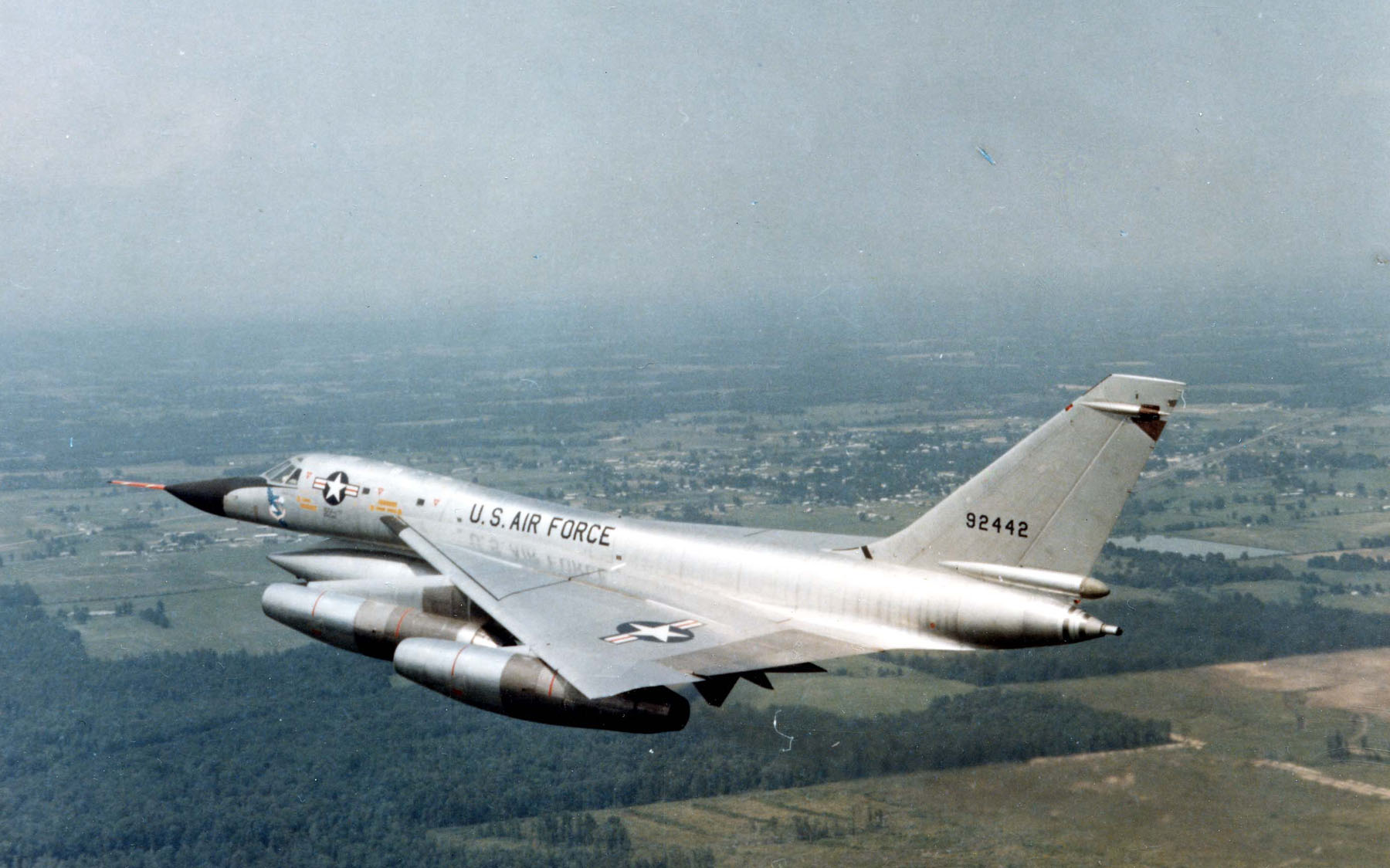
- B-58 Hustler in flight (Note: Aircraft is Convair B-58A-CF, serial 59-2442 Untouchable. It participated in Operation Quick Step and set three world records for class including 2000 km closed course flight averaging 1061.80 mph carrying payload. It became last B-58 to leave Little Rock AFB for the Military Aircraft Storage and Disposition Center. Brewer, Alex P.; Brewer, Randy A. "B-58.com, The B-58 Hustler Page: Inventory". B-58.com..)
- Active: 1941–1946; 1946–1970
- Country: United States
- Branch: United States Air Force
- Role: Bombardment
- Engagements: Southwest Pacific Theater
- Decorations: Distinguished Unit Citation; Air Force Outstanding Unit Award; Philippine Presidential Unit Citation

Insignia
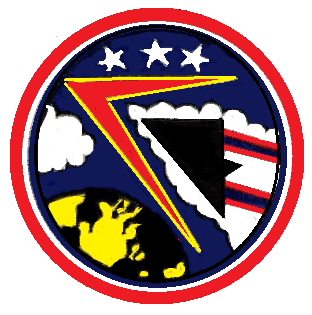
- 64 Bombardment Sq emblem (B-58 era)

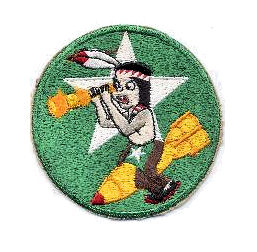
- Patch with 64th Bombardment Squadron emblem< (Note: Maurer indicates this emblem was never officially approved. Maurer, Combat Squadrons, p. 244.)

The 64th Bombardment Squadron is an inactive United States Air Force unit that was last assigned to the 43rd Bombardment Wing at Little Rock Air Force Base, Arkansas, where it was inactivated on 31 January 1970.

The squadron was first activated in January 1941, as one of the original squadrons of the 43rd Bombardment Group. Following the attack on Pearl Harbor, the squadron participated in antisubmarine patrols until January 1942, when it moved to Australia and the Southwest Pacific Theater. It moved forward with US forces through New Guinea and the Philippines, moving to Ie Shima shortly before V-J Day for operations against Japan. It earned two Distinguished Unit Citations and a Philippine Presidential Unit Citation for combat operations. The squadron was inactivated in the Philippines in April 1946.

The squadron was activated again in October 1946, when it assumed the resources of another unit. It operated propeller-driven Boeing B-29 Superfortresses and Boeing B-50 Superfortresses until 1954, when it upgraded to the jet Boeing B-47 Stratojet. In 1960, the squadron moved to Carswell Air Force Base, Texas, where it became one of the Air Force's first supersonic Convair B-58 Hustler units. It continued to operate the Hustler until it was inactivated.

== History ==
=== World War II ===
==== Initial organization and training ====
The squadron was first activated at Langley Field, Virginia as one of the original four squadrons of the 43d Bombardment Group, in the buildup of the United States military forces prior to the American entry into World War II. It was initially equipped with Douglas B-18 Bolos for training, although designated a "heavy" unit. The squadron moved to Army Air Base Bangor, Maine at the end of August. Following the Japanese attack on Pearl Harbor, the squadron conducted antisubmarine patrols off the Atlantic coast until January 1942, when it began moving to reinforce American forces in the Southwest Pacific Theater.

==== Combat in the Pacific ====
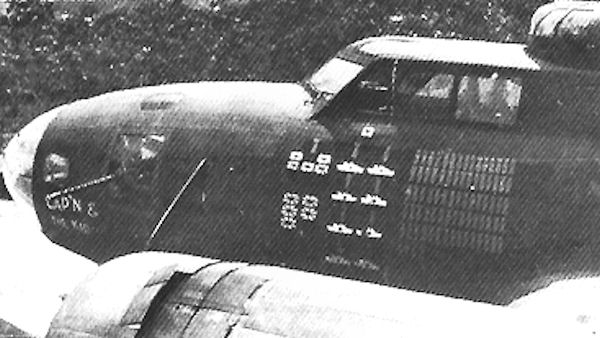
B-17F Flying Fortress with the 64th Bombardment Squadron (Note: This aircraft, serial 41-24353, named Cap'N & The Kids flew 80 combat missions. It was taken out of combat service at Dobodura Airfield, New Guinea in late 1943 and turned into a transport with the 69th Troop Carrier Squadron. It was modified to carry essential supplies, weapons and ammunition to Momote in the Admiralty Islands between 14 February and 4 March 1944. It also dropped supplies during the Invasion of Hollandia in April 1944.)

The squadron reached Australia via Cape Town in March 1942. It was originally equipped with Boeing B-17 Flying Fortresses for combat operations. The squadron operated from bases in Australia until January 1943, when it moved to New Guinea. Between May and September 1942 the squadron replaced its B-17s with Consolidated B-24 Liberators, believed to be more suited to the long ranges of many Pacific missions. It attacked Japanese shipping in the Netherlands East Indies and the Bismarck Archipelago. It experimented with skip bombing and used this technique during the Battle of the Bismarck Sea in March 1943. During this battle, it made repeated attacks against an enemy convoy bringing reinforcements to Japanese forces in New Guinea. For this action, the squadron was awarded a Distinguished Unit Citation. During this period, the squadron also provided air support for ground forces in New Guinea. It attacked airfields and enemy installations in New Guinea, the Bismarck Archipelago, Celebes, Halmahera, Yap, Palau, and the southern Philippines.

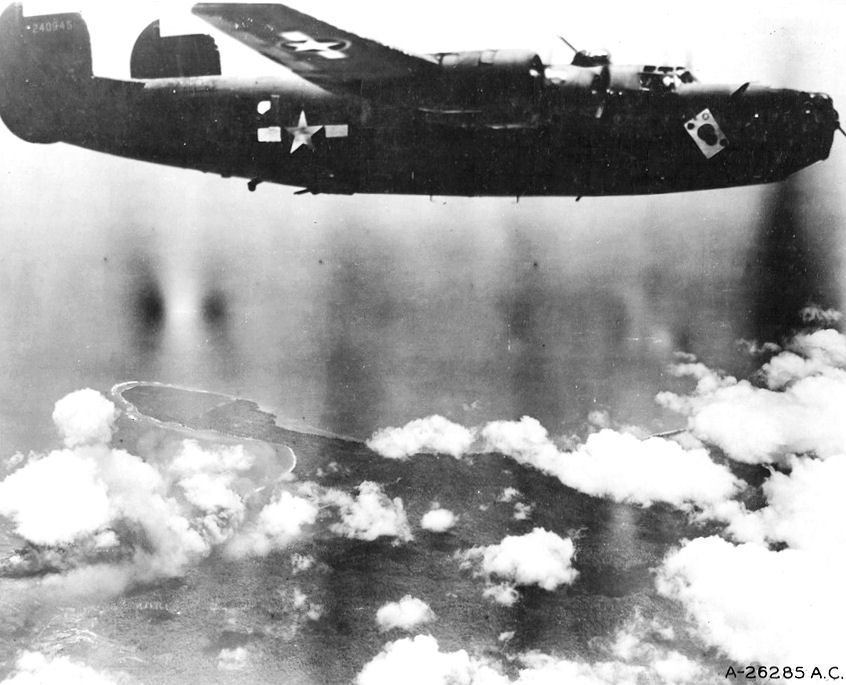
Squadron B-24 Liberator in December 1943 (Note: Aircraft is Consolidated B-24D-115-CO Liberator, serial 42-40945 The Ace O' Spades. Photo taken 20 December 1943.)

In November 1944 the squadron moved to the Philippines, helping the ground campaign on Luzon as well as conducting bombing missions against airfields, industrial installations and enemy installations in China and Formosa. In July 1945 it moved to Ie Shima Airfield, from which it flew missions over Japan, attacking railroads and airfields, as well as shipping in the Seto Inland Sea until V-J Day. After ceasing operations, the squadron sent its aircraft to the Philippines for reclamation and relocated to Fort William McKinley as a paper unit. It was finally inactivated in April 1946.

=== Strategic Air Command operations ===
Reactivated under Strategic Air Command at Davis-Monthan Field, Arizona on 1 October 1946 and, along with the other squadrons of the 43rd Group, absorbed the personnel and Boeing B-29 Superfortresses of the 40th and 444th Bombardment Groups, which were simultaneously inactivated. One of the first operational B-29 squadrons of SAC, the squadron was not fully manned or equipped until 1948. Trained for strategic bombardment missions during the postwar years, being upgraded to the new atomic bomb-capable Boeing B-50 Superfortress in 1948. Replaced the propeller-driven B-50s with new Boeing B-47E Stratojet swept-wing medium bombers in 1954, capable of flying at high subsonic speeds and primarily designed for penetrating the airspace of the Soviet Union. In the late 1950s, the B-47 was considered to be reaching obsolescence, and was being phased out of SAC's strategic arsenal. Began sending aircraft to other B-47 wings as replacements in late 1959, sending the last of its B-47s to the Military Aircraft Storage and Disposition Center in Arizona in early 1960.

==== B-58 operations ====
The squadron moved to Carswell Air Force Base without personnel or equipment on 15 April 1960, and was not manned or equipped until August. Then it took over personnel and equipment from the 3958th Combat Crew Training Squadron and the 6592d Test Squadron, which were discontinued. The squadron immediately began training crews on the Convair B-58 Hustler. The squadron was equipped with experimental and training models of the Hustler, along with Convair TF-102 Delta Daggers, to perform Category II and III evaluations of the new bomber, along with its training responsibilities. The evaluations of the Hustler ended in 1962.

At the beginning of the Cuban Missile Crisis in October 1962, Only six B-58s in the entire SAC inventory were on alert. Even these aircraft were "second cycle" (follow on) sorties. Crew training was suspended, and the squadron, along with SAC's other B-58 squadrons, began placing its bombers on alert. By the first week of November, 84 B-58s were standing nuclear alert, and as SAC redeployed its Boeing KC-135 Stratotankers, 20 of these were "first cycle" sorties. (Note: The availability of KC-135s to refuel the B-58s was the main factor in relegating them to the second cycle of the war plan. KC-135s were primarily dedicated to refueling B-52s. See Kipp et al. p. 30 and following for SAC bomber actions during the Cuban Crisis.) Within a short time, this grew to 41 bombers. By 20 November, SAC resumed its normal alert posture, and half the squadron's aircraft were kept on alert.

In September 1964, the 43d Wing and the squadron moved to Little Rock Air Force Base, Arkansas. In December 1965, Robert S. McNamara, Secretary of Defense announced a phaseout program that would further reduce SAC's bomber force. This program called for the mid-1971 retirement of all B-58s and some Boeing B-52 Stratofortress models. With the removal of the B-58 from SAC's bomber force, the squadron was inactivated at the end of January 1970.

== Lineage ==
- Constituted as the 64th Bombardment Squadron (Heavy) on 20 November 1940

Activated on 15 January 1941
Redesignated 64th Bombardment Squadron, Heavy c. 1944
Inactivated on 29 April 1946
Redesignated 64th Bombardment Squadron, Very Heavy and activated on 1 October 1946
Redesignated 64th Bombardment Squadron, (Medium) on 2 July 1948
Inactivated on 31 January 1970 (Note: The squadron is not related to the Bombardment Squadron, Provisional, 64th, which was designated by SAC and organized at Andersen Air Force Base, Guam on 1 June 1972 and attached to the Strategic Wing, Provisional, 72d. This squadron was organized to control Boeing B-52 Stratofortress bombers conducting Operation Arc Light and Operation Linebacker missions. It ended combat operations on 15 August 1973, flying the last B-52 raid over Cambodia and was inactivated on 15 November 1973.)

=== Assignments ===
- 43d Bombardment Group, 15 January 1941 – 29 April 1946
- 43d Bombardment Group, 1 October 1946 (attached to 43d Bombardment Wing after 10 February 1951)
- 43d Bombardment Wing, 16 June 1952 – 31 January 1970

=== Stations ===
- Langley Field, Virginia, 15 January 1941
- Army Air Base. Bangor, Maine, 29 August 1941 – 17 February 1942
- Sydney, New South Wales, Australia, c. 16 March 1942
- Daly Waters Airfield, Northern Territory, Australia, c. 16 May 1942
- Fenton Airfield, Northern Territory, Australia, 2 August – 25 September 1942
- Iron Range Airfield, Queensland, Australia, 12 October 1942
- Mareeba Airfield, Queensland, Australia, c. 8 November 1942
- Jackson Airdrome, Port Moresby, Papua New Guinea, 20 January 1943
- Dobodura Airfield, Papua New Guinea, to December 1943
- Nadzab Airfield, Papua New Guinea, 11 March 1944
- Owi Airfield, Schouten Islands, Netherlands East Indies, c. 10 July 1944
- Tacloban Airfield, Leyte, Philippines, 23 November 1944
- Clark Field, Luzon, Philippines, c. 22 March 1945
- Ie Shima Airfield, Okinawa, 26 July 1945
- Fort William McKinley, Luzon, Philippines, 10 December 1945 – 29 April 1946
- Davis-Monthan Field (later Davis-Monthan Air Force Base), Arizona, 1 October 1946
- Carswell Air Force Base, Texas, 15 March 1960
- Little Rock Air Force Base, Arkansas, 1 September 1964 – 31 January 1970

=== Aircraft ===
- Douglas B-18 Bolo, 1941–1942
- Boeing B-17 Flying Fortress, 1942–1943
- Consolidated B-24 Liberator, 1943–1945
- Boeing B-29 Superfortress, 1946–1950
- Boeing B-50 Superfortress, 1948–1954
- Boeing B-47 Stratojet, 1954–1960
- Convair B-58 Hustler, 1960–1970

=== Awards and campaigns ===
| Award streamer | Award | Dates | Notes |
|---|---|---|---|
| | Distinguished Unit Citation | c. 13 August 1942 – 23 January 1943 | Papua New Guinea 64th Bombardment Squadron |
| | Distinguished Unit Citation | 2-4 March 1943 | Bismarck Sea 64th Bombardment Squadron |
| | Air Force Outstanding Unit Award | 1 August 1960 – 1 August 1962 | 64th Bombardment Squadron |
| | Philippine Republic Presidential Unit Citation | 17 October 44 – 4 July 45 | 64th Bombardment Squadron |

| Campaign Streamer | Campaign | Dates | Notes |
|---|---|---|---|
| | Air Offensive, Japan | 17 April 1942 – 2 September 1945 | 64th Bombardment Squadron |
| | China Defensive | 4 July 1942 – 4 May 1945 | 64th Bombardment Squadron |
| | Papua | 23 July 1942 – 23 January 1943 | 64th Bombardment Squadron |
| | New Guinea | 24 January 1943 – 31 December 1944 | 64th Bombardment Squadron |
| | Northern Solomons | 23 February 1943 – 21 November 1944 | 64th Bombardment Squadron |
| | Bismarck Archipelago | 15 December 1943 – 27 November 1944 | 64th Bombardment Squadron |
| | Leyte | 17 October 1944 – 1 July 1945 | 64th Bombardment Squadron |
| | Luzon | 15 December 1944 – 4 July 1945 | 64th Bombardment Squadron |
| | Southern Philippines | 27 February 1945 – 4 July 1945 | 64th Bombardment Squadron |
| | Western Pacific | 17 April 1945 – 2 September 1945 | 64th Bombardment Squadron |
| | China Offensive | 5 May 1945 – 2 September 1945 | 64th Bombardment Squadron |

== See also ==
- United States Army Air Forces in Australia
- B-17 Flying Fortress units of the United States Army Air Forces
- B-24 Liberator units of the United States Army Air Forces
- List of B-47 units of the United States Air Force
