= United States Army Air Forces in Australia =

Airfields of the United States Army Air Force in Australia
- Part of World War II
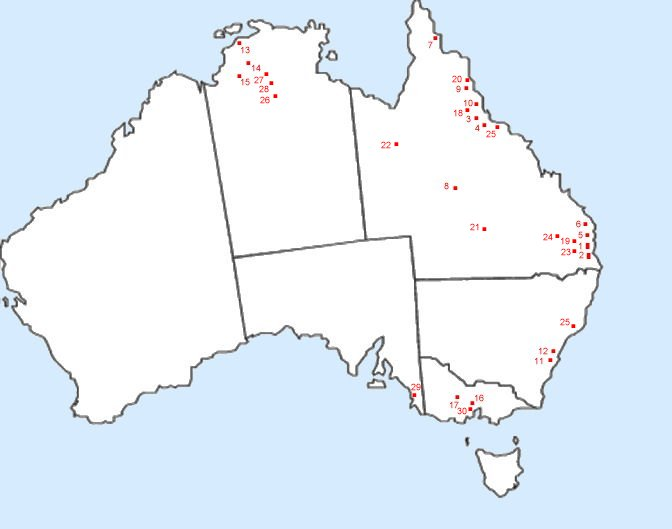
Date	1942–1945
Location	Australia
Result	Allied victory over the Empire of Japan (1945)

During World War II, the United States Army Air Forces established a series of airfields in Australia for the collective defense of the country, as well as for conducting offensive operations against the Imperial Japanese Army and Navy. From these airports and airfields in Australia, the Fifth Air Force was able to regroup, re-equip and begin offensive operations against the Empire of Japan after the disasters in the Philippines and Dutch East Indies during 1942.

== Overview ==
Following the Japanese conquest of the Philippines, the remnants of the USAAF Far East Air Force relocated southwest to bases in the Dutch East Indies (Indonesia). United States Army Air Force units in Australia, including the Fifth Air Force, were eventually reinforced and re-organized following their initial defeats in the Philippines and the East Indies. After those islands also fell to Japanese forces early in 1942, FEAF headquarters moved to Australia and was reorganized and redesignated the Fifth Air Force on 5 February 1942 under General George Brett in Melbourne. On paper, Brett had several hundred military aircraft of all types, but only a few of them were operational, although replacements were in the logistics pipeline inbound on freighters

Headquarters, Fifth Air Force, was re-staffed at Brisbane, Australia on 18 September 1942 and the Fifth Air Force was placed under the command of 52-year-old Major General George Kenney on Tuesday, 28 July 1942, which had immediate impact. Within a month, he had his command striving for, or at least seriously thinking about, seizing air superiority over New Guinea and parity over the Solomon Sea, and September 1942 saw the Fifth placing several dozen bombers over New Britain and Rabaul, whereas in July 1942 only mere handfuls could be fielded. By the end of August 1942, before the retreat began of the Japanese attacking over the Owen Stanley Ranges, he'd established five airfields at Port Moresby, more than necessary for its defense, but a good start for staging to forward bases.

General Kenney encouraged MacArthur to conduct a forward defense and meet the Japanese along the choke-points among the jungles of New Guinea, and provided planning for airlifts to put the ground forces in forward positions and supply them by air-transport if necessary. This model would be utilized throughout the coming two years of offensives as MacArthur's ground forces conducted Leapfrogging maneuvers and used combined arms tactics while strategically bypassing Japanese strong points and forcing them to attack his defensive works as he placed forces astride their supply lines. The Fifth Air Force kept pace, moving from forward air base to forward air base, repressing daylight activity by the Japanese on Land, Sea and Air. When he first proposed air supply (since sea-lanes were not safe because of the position of the Japanese bases in the Solomon Sea) to an objection that his C-47 airlift units could not move trucks as well as men and materials, Kenney immediately responded that they could, by cutting the truck frames in half with torches and welding them together again in Papua. By November the Fifth was in forward Headquarters in Port Moresby, though the official HQ remained in Brisbane.

In addition to the Air Force units, many United States Army forces embarked in Australia, using it as a base of operations prior to their deployment to New Guinea in 1942, and other islands in the Southwest Pacific, driving the Japanese forces north towards their home islands. As the ground forces moved forward, the tactical air units of the AAF moved with them, providing the necessary air support for the ground operations.

Throughout the Pacific War, Australia remained an important base of operations, but with the advance of the Allied Armies, the air-bases in Australia were returned to the Royal Australian Air Force once the Allied forces deployed north during 1942 and 1943. Today, most of the airfields in the Northern Territory have returned to their natural state, being abandoned after the war, but most of the airfields in Queensland and the other Australian states and territories still exist as civilian airports or military bases.

Later, during the Cold War, the United States Air Force assigned a small number of personnel to Australia for communication duties and logistical support. Today, USAF units routinely visit Australia for joint exercises with the Australian Defence Force, with a few personnel assigned for military liaison duties.

== Major units ==
The initial USAAF units assigned to Australia in late 1941 and 1942 were ones which had withdrawn from the Philippines, leaving their ground echelons in Bataan as part of the 5th Interceptor Command to fight as infantry units. Later in 1942 and 1943, additional units arrived from the United States as replacement and augmentation to the Fifth Air Force for offensive operations. Known units assigned were:

- Bombardment

3d Bombardment Group (25 February 1942 – 28 January 1943)

(A-20 Havoc, A-24 Dauntless, B-25 Mitchell)

7th Bombardment Group (22 December 1941 – 4 February 1942)

(B-17 Flying Fortress)

19th Bombardment Group (24 December 1941 – 2 December 1942)

(B-17 Flying Fortress)

22d Bombardment Group (1 March 1942 – 9 October 1943)

(B-26 Marauder)

27th Bombardment Group (February–4 May 1943)

(A-24 Dauntless)

38th Bombardment Group (25 February – October 1942)

(B-25 Mitchell)

43d Bombardment Group (28 March – 14 September 1942)

(B-17 Flying Fortress)

90th Bombardment Group (November 1942 – 10 February 1943)

(B-24 Liberator)

380th Bombardment Group (May 1943 – 20 February 1945)

(B-24 Liberator)

- Fighter

8th Fighter Group (6 March 1942 – 16 May 1943)

(P-39 Airacobra, P-38 Lightning)

35th Fighter Group (4 May – 22 July 1942)

(P-39 Airacobra, P-38 Lightning)

49th Fighter Group (2 February – 9 October 1942)

(Curtiss P-40)

58th Fighter Group (19 November – 28 December 1943)

(P-47 Thunderbolt)

- Other

6th Reconnaissance Group (10 October – 10 December 1943
317th Troop Carrier Group (23 January – 30 September 1943)
374th Troop Carrier Group (12 November 1942 – 1 September 1944)
60th Air Depot Group
1124th Military Police (1943 - 1945)

== Major aircraft operated ==
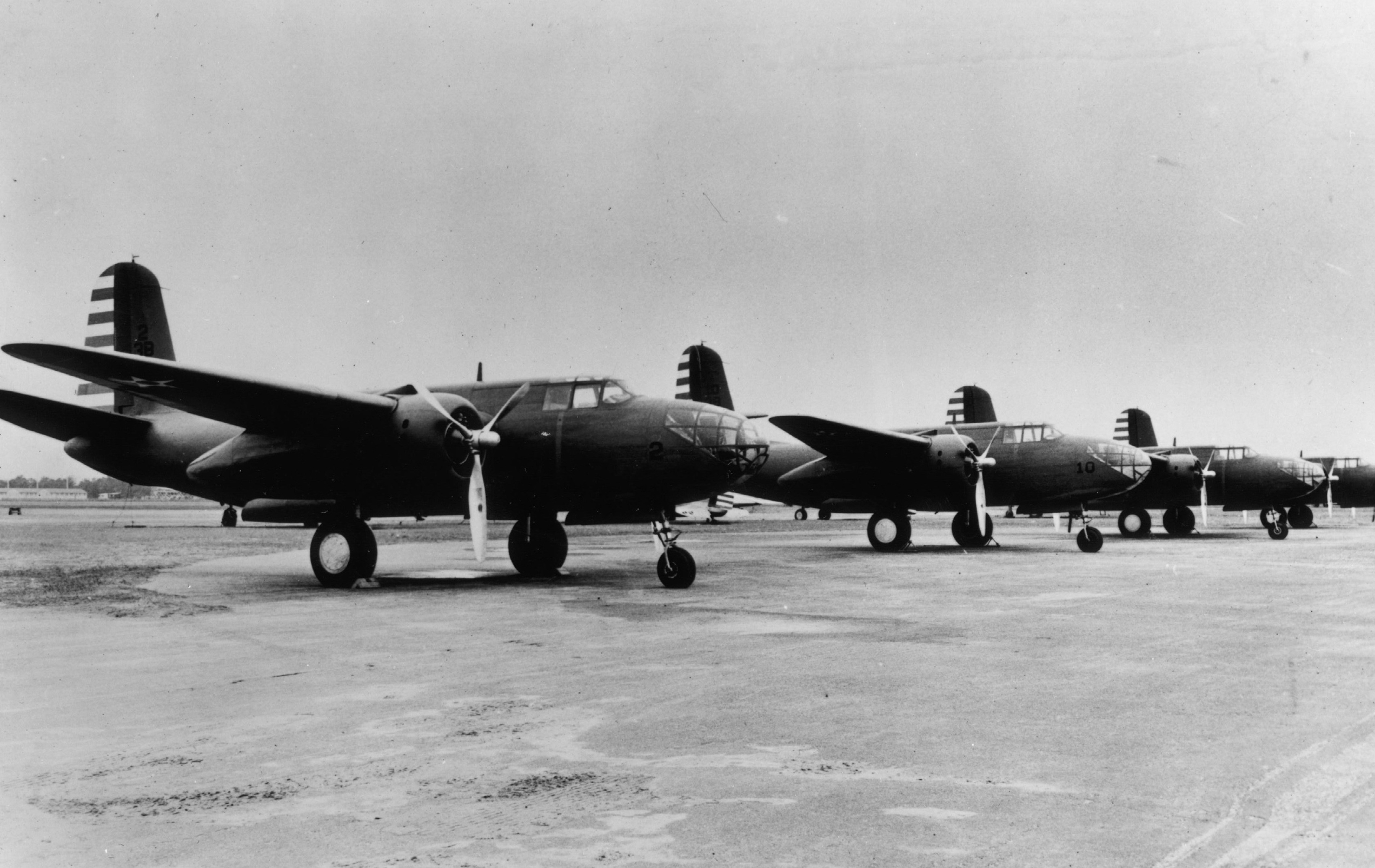
A-20 aircraft of the 3rd Bomb Group, 89th Bomb Squadron

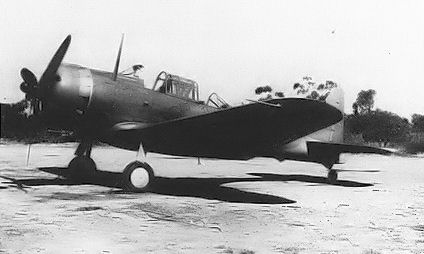
Unidentified 1941 serial Douglas A-24-DE Dauntless Dive Bomber, ex 27th Bombardment Group (Light), reassigned to the 8th Squadron of the 3rd Bomb Group, Charters Towers Airfield, Queensland, Australia, 1942.

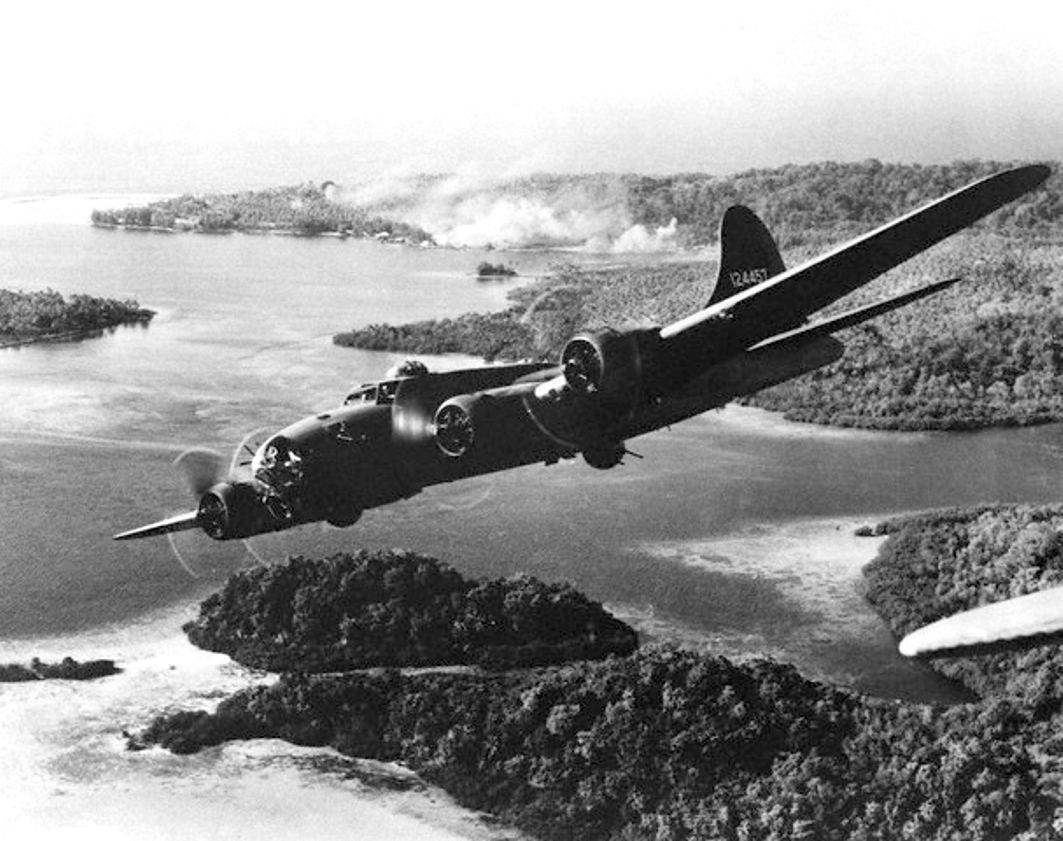
B-17E attacking Japanese positions on Gizo Island in the Solomons

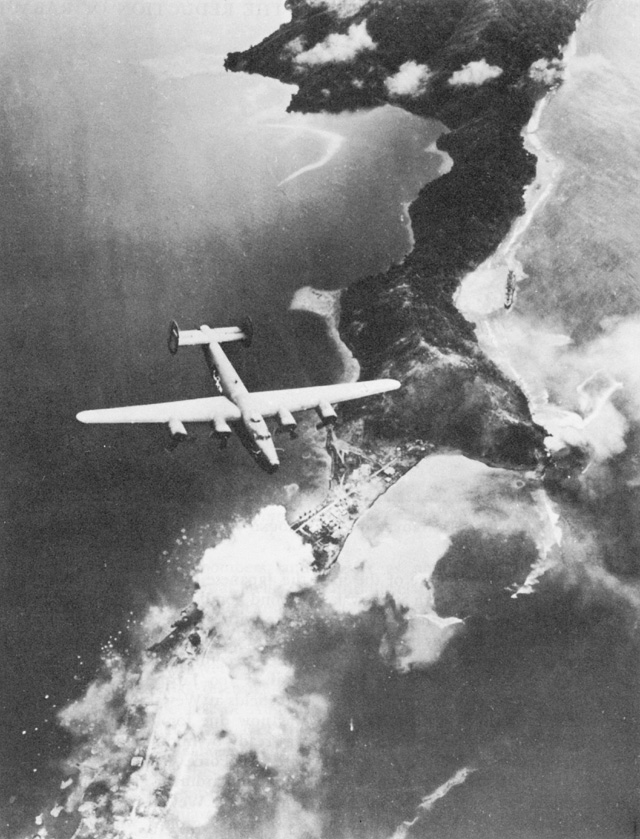
B-24 Over Salamaua, 13 August 1943. Note smoke from bomb bursts.

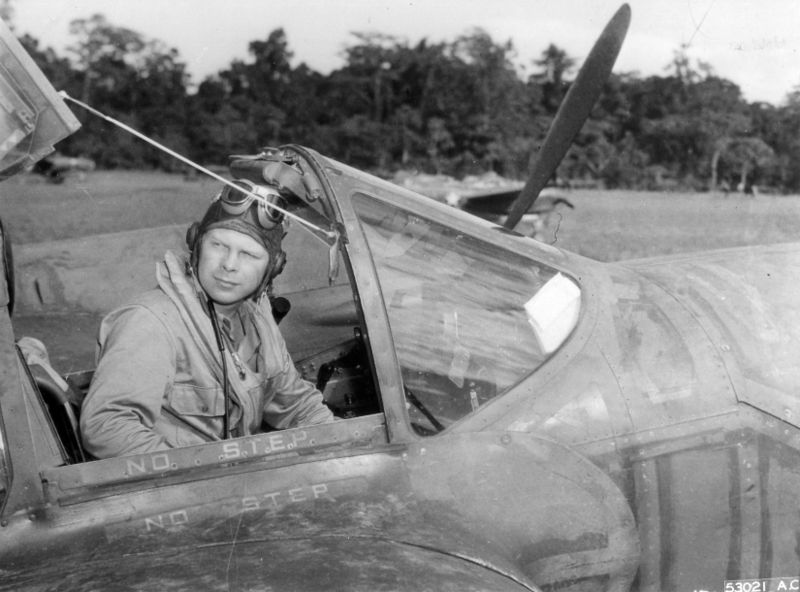
Major Richard Bong in his P-38.

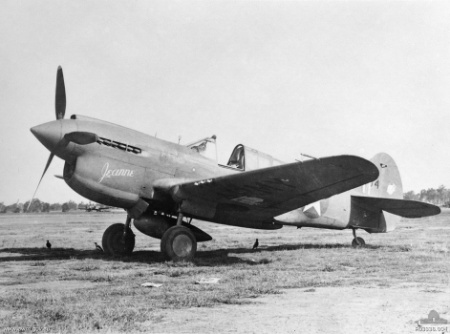
P-40E of the 7th Fighter Squadron – 49th Fighter Group – Australia – March 1942

- A-20 Havoc. A-20s first arrived in Australia by way of the air echelon of the 3rd Bombardment Group (Light) and the first operational unit to fly the A-20 in actual battle was the 89th Bombardment Squadron of the 3rd Bombardment Group. Many A-20s were reassigned to the RAAF, being known as Bostons by the RAAF and had varied origins, some being ex-USAAF machines, some being acquired from the Netherlands Marine Luchtvaartdenst, and others being diverted from British contracts. These planes served with just one RAAF squadron, No. 22 Squadron which saw a lot of action in the Dutch East Indies.
- A-24 Dauntless. The first operational A-24 unit was the 27th Bombardment Group (Light). Three of the four squadrons of the 27th BG were equipped with the A-24, plus one squadron of the 3rd Bombardment Group. The remaining squadrons of these groups were equipped with A-20A twin-engined level bombers. The crews of the 27th BG were in the Philippines when war broke out in the Pacific but their aircraft were in-transit via ship from Hawaii. The shipment was diverted to Brisbane, where they arrived on 22 December. Some of the 27th BG pilots were sent from the Philippines to ferry their aircraft back from Australia but were unable to do so when gun motors and solenoids could not be found during assembly. From Brisbane, eleven A-24s flew up to Java in February 1942, but this battle was already lost. The remainder began operations from Port Moresby, New Guinea with the 8th Bombardment Squadron on 1 April 1942. These units suffered heavy losses in the face of the Japanese advance. After five of seven A-24s were lost on their last mission, the A-24s were withdrawn from action as being too slow, too short-ranged, and too poorly armed. However, in all fairness to the A-24, their pilots had not been trained in dive-bombing operations and they often had to operate without adequate fighter escort. Following the New Guinea debacle, the A-24s were withdrawn from combat and the 27th was returned to the United States, where after being re-equipped with A-20s was sent to North Africa as part of Twelfth Air Force.
- B-17 Flying Fortress. After the mission to attack a Japanese amphibious operation at Legaspi on 14 December 1941, only 14 B-17s remained of the original 35 assigned to the Philippines on 8 December. All were stationed at Del Monte Field on Mindanao, with the aircraft needing depot maintenance. Beginning on 17 December, the B-17s began to be evacuated to Batchelor Airfield near Darwin. These first B-17s in Australia were shark-tailed C and D models. The first B-17 mission out of Australia, an attack on Japanese shipping at Davao, took place on 22 December with nine "Flying Forts" taking part. They landed at Del Monte, which remained in American hands until April 1942. However, the small force of B-17s could do very little to stem the tide of the Japanese advance, launching valiant but futile attacks against the masses of Japanese shipping. Newer large-tailed B-17Es began to join the depleted force of earlier-model B-17s in the Pacific in mid-1942, with the tail gunner of the B-17E being unpleasant surprise for the Japanese, who had become accustomed to attacking the Fortress from the rear. The crews of pre-B-17E Fortresses often adopted the expediency of rigging sticks in the rear of their planes, hoping to convince the Japanese attackers that tail guns were actually fitted to these planes as well. However, by mid-1943, most Fortresses had been withdrawn from the Pacific in favor of the longer-ranged B-24 Liberator. The B-24 was better suited for operations in the Pacific, having a higher speed and a larger bombload at medium altitudes. In addition, the losses of Eighth Air Force in Europe were reaching such magnitudes that the entire B-17 production was urgently needed for replacements and training in that theatre. Shortly after the Battle of the Bismarck Sea, it was decided that no more B-17s would be sent to Australia.
- B-24 Liberator. Fifteen USAAF LB-30 (B-24A) bombers were deployed in Java in early 1942 to reinforce the B-17-equipped 19th Bombardment Group in a vain attempt to stem the Japanese advance. The Java-based LB-30s would be the first US-flown Liberators to see action and participated in numerous attacks against Japanese targets in the Sulawesi, in Sumatra, and against shipping during the Japanese invasion of Bali. By late February, the position of Allied forces in Java had become untenable, and the surviving LB-30s were evacuated to Australia. The early LB-30s were replaced by the first B-24Ds to reach the Pacific in late 1942. By 1943, the Liberator had almost entirely replaced the B-17 Fortress as the primary long-range heavy bomber in the theatre. The B-24 became the most numerous USAAF heavy bomber based in Australia and New Guinea in the most desperate phase of the Pacific war, and it was the first four-engine heavy bomber to serve with the Royal Australian Air Force home squadrons. It reigned supreme in the Pacific until the arrival of the B-29 Superfortress in mid-1944.
- Martin B-26 Marauder/North American B-25 Mitchell. In February 1942, the 22d Bombardment Group was ordered to Australia, being assigned to bases around Townsville. The B-26 first entered combat on 5 April 1942, when the 22nd Group took off from their bases in Queensland, refuelled at Port Moresby, and then attacked Japanese facilities at Rabaul. Each B-26 had a 250-gallon bomb bay and carried a 2000– pound bombload. The Marauder was the only medium bomber available in the Pacific, and generally, no fighter escort was available leaving the Marauders were on their own if they encountered enemy fighters. There were two groups equipped with B-26s, the 22nd and 38th, with two squadrons of the 38th Bombardment Group (69th and 70th) equipped with B-26s. In this series of attacks on Japanese-held facilities in the Dutch East Indies, the B-26s gained a reputation for speed and ruggedness against strong opposition from Japanese Zero fighters. Attacks on Rabaul ended on 24 May, after 80 sorties had flown. A series of unescorted raids were made on Japanese installations in the Lae area. These raids were vigorously opposed by Zero fighters. In the 84 sorties flown against Lae between 24 April and 4 July 1942, three Marauders were lost. As the Allies pushed northward in the South Pacific, temporary airfields had to be cut out of the jungle and these runways were generally fairly short. The North American B-25 Mitchell had a shorter takeoff run than the B-26, and it began to take over the medium bomber duties. Although it was admitted that the B-26 could take greater punishment, was defensively superior, and could fly faster with a heavier bomb load, the B-25 had better short-field characteristics, good sortie rate, and minimal maintenance requirements. In addition, the B-25 was considerably easier to manufacture and had suffered from fewer developmental problems. At this time, there were more B-25s available for South Pacific duty because it had been decided to send the B-26 Marauder to the Mediterranean theatre. Consequently, it was decided to adopt the B-25 as the standard medium bomber for the entire Pacific theatre, and to use the B-26 exclusively to Twelfth Air Force in the Mediterranean with some later being used by Ninth Air Force in the European theatres.
- P-38 Lightning. The first P-38s to reach Australia during 1942 were P-38Fs assigned to the 39th Fighter Squadron of the 35th Fighter Group. This unit traded in its Bell P-39 Airacobras for the Lightnings at RAAF Base Amberley in Queensland before returning to combat operations at Port Moresby in New Guinea. Its first success took place on 27 December 1942 when its pilots claimed eleven kills for the loss of only one P-38F. Two of these kills were claimed by Richard I. Bong, who was to go on to claim a total of 40 kills, all of them while flying the Lightning. The Lightning was ideally suited for the Pacific theatre. It possessed a performance markedly superior to that of its Japanese opponents. It possessed a range significantly better than that of the P-39s, P-40s and P-47s available in 1942 in the Southwest Pacific, and its twin engines offered an additional safety factor when operating over long stretches of water and jungle. However, the limited number of Lightnings available during late 1942 and early 1943 had to be used to make up attrition in the 39th Fighter Squadron and to equip only a single squadron in each of the 8th and 49th Fighter Groups.
- P-39 Airacobra. At the time of Pearl Harbor, the P-39 (along with the P-40 and a few P-38s) was virtually the only modern fighter available to the USAAF. Those P-39s already in service with the USAAF at the time of Pearl Harbor were deployed at home bases, but were quickly moved forward to overseas bases in the Pacific to try to stem the Japanese advance. They carried much of the load in the initial Allied efforts in 1942. However, many Allied pilots lacked adequate training, and equipment and maintenance of the planes were below average. The Airacobras operating from Australia were sometimes called upon to serve as interceptors, a role for which they were totally unsuited. They proved to be no match for the Japanese Zero in air-to-air combat and were withdrawn from combat by the end of 1942.
- Curtiss P-40. During 1941, a substantial number of P-40Bs and Cs were shipped to USAAF bases overseas, including the 20th Pursuit Squadron of the 24th Pursuit Group at Clark Field in the Philippines. Almost all were destroyed in the Battle of the Philippines (1941–42), and only a few reached Australia, although the RAAF operated a large number of P-40E-1 export models (Kittyhawk IA) and P-40Ks (Kittyhawk III) from the United States.
- P-47 Thunderbolt. The first P-47Ds to arrive in the Pacific theatre entered service with the 348th Fighter Group in June 1943. They were initially operated out of Queensland and were used on long-range missions to strike at Japanese targets in New Guinea. The 348th was followed by the 35th Group and at the beginning of 1944 by the 58th Group as well as the 35th Squadron of the 8th Group and the 9th FS of the 49th Group. However the Thunderbolt was used primarily by Seventh and Thirteenth Air Forces in the Central Pacific, with the long-range P-47N arriving in June 1944.

== Airfields and unit assignments ==
In cooperation with the Royal Australian Air Force, (RAAF), the Fifth Air Force was able to use many existing Australian airports and airfields to carry on the war effort. In 1942, additional new military airfields were constructed by Australian and United States engineering units to accommodate the increasing number of USAAF groups and personnel being deployed. The Air Force groups and squadrons moved frequently from airfield to airfield, and often group headquarters was located away from the operational squadrons, as the squadrons were dispersed over several airfields for defensive purposes.

Known airfields of the Fifth Air Force units and squadron assignments are as follows:

Note: Airfield locations shown on map above

Australian Capital Territory

- RAAF Base Fairbairn, Canberra, Australian Capital Territory

35°18′25″S 149°11′42″E

8th Fighter Squadron (49th Fighter Group) (16 February – 17 April 1942)

Northern Territory

- Batchelor Airfield, Batchelor, Northern Territory

13°3′21.14″S 131°1′40.68″E
19th Bombardment Group (Heavy), (24–30 December 1941) (First B-17s arrived on 17 December 1941)
27th Bombardment Group (Light), (March–4 May 1942)

16th Bombardment Squadron (Light) (17 February – 8 March 1942)
17th Bombardment Squadron (Light) (22 February – 8 March 1942)

7th Fighter Squadron, 49th Fighter Group, (9 April – 18 September 1942)
14th Bombardment Squadron (Heavy), 7th Bombardment Group (Heavy) attached to 19th Bombardment Group (Heavy) (24 December 1941 – 30 December 1941) (Air echelon only. Ground echelon fighting as infantry as part of 5th Interceptor Command (Provisional), Bataan, Luzon, Philippines)
28th Bombardment Squadron (Heavy), 19th Bombardment Group (Heavy) (24–30 December 1941) (Air echelon only. Ground echelon fighting as infantry as part of 5th Interceptor Command (Provisional), Bataan, Luzon, Philippines)
30th Bombardment Squadron (Heavy), 19th Bombardment Group (Heavy) (20–31 December 1941) (Air echelon only. Ground echelon fighting as infantry as part of 5th Interceptor Command (Provisional), Bataan, Luzon, Philippines)
71st Bombardment Squadron (Medium), 38th Bombardment Group (Medium)), (30 April – 11 August 1942)
93d Bombardment Squadron (Heavy), 19th Bombardment Group (Heavy) (19 December 1941 – 1 January 1942)

- Daly Waters Airfield, Daly Waters, Northern Territory

16°15′42″S 133°22′50″E

64th Bombardment Squadron (Heavy), 43d Bombardment Group (Heavy), (16 May – 1 August 1942)

- Fenton Airfield, Tipperary Station, Hayes Creek, Northern Territory

13°37′23.46″S 131°20′19.60″E
380th Bombardment Group (Heavy), (May 1943 – 8 August 1944)

528th Bombardment Squadron (Heavy), (28 April 1943 – 19 August 1944)
530th Bombardment Squadron (Heavy), (1 May 1942 – 8 August 1944)

64th Bombardment Squadron (Heavy), 43d Bombardment Group, (2 August – 25 September 1942)

- Long Strip, Hayes Creek, Northern Territory

13°34′59.03″S 131°25′23.20″E
529th Bombardment Squadron (Heavy), 380th Bombardment Group (Heavy), (7 November 1943 – 9 July 1944)
531st Bombardment Squadron (Heavy), (380th Bombardment Group) (Heavy), (5 December 1943 – 20 July 1944)

- Manbulloo Airfield, Manbulloo Station, Northern Territory

14°35′58.35″S 132°11′24.22″E
529th Bombardment Squadron (Heavy), 380th Bombardment Group (Heavy), (28 April – 6 November 1943)
531st Bombardment Squadron (Heavy), 380th Bombardment Group (Heavy), (28 April – 4 December 1943)

- RAAF Base Darwin, Darwin, Northern Territory

12°24′53″S 130°52′36″E
Headquarters, Far East Air Force, (23 December 1941 – 18 January 1942)
Headquarters, V Bomber Command, (December 1941 – January 1942)
49th Pursuit Group (Interceptor), (16 April – 14 May 1942)

8th Pursuit Squadron (Interceptor), (17 April – 14 May 1942)
9th Pursuit Squadron, (Interceptor) (17 March – 14 May 1942)

49th Fighter Group, (15 May – 8 October 1942)

8th Fighter Squadron, (15 Mayl – 24 September 1942)
9th Fighter Squadron, (15 May – 9 October 1942)

380th Bombardment Group (Heavy), (9 August 1944 – 20 February 1945)

528th Bombardment Squadron, (Heavy) (20 August 1944 – 20 February 1945)
529th Bombardment Squadron, (Heavy) (10 July 1944 – 21 February 1945)
530th Bombardment Squadron, (Heavy) (9 August 1944 – 27 February 1945)
531st Bombardment Squadron, (Heavy) (21 July 1944 – 28 February 1945)

319th Bombardment Squadron 90th Bombardment Group (Heavy), (2 February – 7 July 1943)

- Queensland
- Antil Plains Aerodrome, Townsville, Queensland

19°26′37.20″S 146°49′33.72″E

33d Bombardment Squadron (Medium), 22d Bombardment Group (Medium), (7 April – 19 July 1942)

- Archerfield Airfield, Brisbane, Queensland

27°34′13″S 153°00′29″E
54th Troop Carrier Wing, (13 March – 2 May 1943)
3d Bombardment Group (Light), (25 February – 9 March 1942)

8th Bombardment Squadron (Light), (25 February – 16 March 1942)
13th Bombardment Squadron (Light), (25 February–9 March 1942)
90th Bombardment Squadron (Light), (25 February – 7 March 1942)

6th Photographic Reconnaissance Group, (27 November – 9 December 1943)
7th Bombardment Group (Heavy), (22 December 1941 – 4 February 1942)

9th Bombardment Squadron (Heavy), (22 December 1941 – 3 February 1942), (operated from Singosari, Java, NEI 13–19 January 1942 and Jogjakarta, Jave 19 January-3 February 1942)
11th Bombardment Squadron (Heavy), (22 December 1941 – 18 January 1942), (operated from Singosari, Java, NEI 13–19 January 1942)
22d Bombardment Squadron (Heavy), (22 December 1941 – 18 January 1942) (air echelon at Hickam Field, Oahu, Territory of Hawaii 22 December 1941-5 January 1942 and Singosari, Java, NEI 13–19 January 1942)
88th Reconnaissance Squadron (Heavy), 7th Bombardment Group (Heavy), (22 December 1941 – 4 February 1942) (Ground echelon only; air echelon operated from Hickam Field, Oahu, Territory of Hawaii attached to 31st Bombardment Squadron (Heavy) 22 December 1941 – 4 February 1942)

22d Bombardment Group (Medium), U.S. Army Forces in Australia (25 February – 7 March 1942)

2d Bombardment Squadron (Medium) (25 February – 1 March 1942)
18th Reconnaissance Squadron (Medium) (25 February – 6 April 1942)
19th Bombardment Squadron (Medium) (25 February – 1 March 1942) (air echelon at Hickam Field, Oahua, Territory of Hawaii 15 February-ca. 1 March 1942)
33d Bombardment Squadron (Medium) (25–28 February 1942)

35th Pursuit Group (Interceptor), IV Interceptor Command (1 February 1942 – March 1942)

39th Pursuit Squadron, (Interceptor) (25 February – 7 March 1942)
40th Pursuit Squadron (Interceptor), (25 February – 8 March 1942)
41st Pursuit Squadron (Interceptor), (25 February – 7 March 1942)

49th Pursuit Group (Interceptor), Allied Air Forces, Southwest Pacific Area (7–16 April 1942)
58th Fighter Group, (21 November – 27 December 1943)

310th Fighter Squadron, (23 November-27 December 1943)
311th Fighter Squadron, (21 November-27 December 1943)

374th Troop Carrier Group, (12 November – December 1942)

21st Troop Carrier Squadron (12 November 1942 – 17 February 1943)
33d Troop Carrier Squadron, (1–27 December 1943)

8th Photographic Squadron, Allied Air Forces, Southwest Pacific Area (24 April – 1 May 1942)
16th Bombardment Squadron (Light), 27th Bombardment Group (Light), (air echelon operated here 24 December 1941–16 February 1942 and 10–25 March 1942)
17th Bombardment Squadron (Light), 27th Bombardment Group (Light), (air echelon operated here 24 December 1941–16 February 1942 and 10–25 March 1942)
21st Transport Squadron, Air Transport Command, US Army Forces in Australia, (3 April 1942 – 4 July 1942)
21st Troop Carrier Squadron, Air Transport Command, US Army Forces in Australia, (5 July-11 November 1942
69th Fighter Squadron, 58th Fighter Group (21 November-28 December 1943)
91st Bombardment Squadron (Light), 27th Bombardment Group (Light), (air echelon operated here 24 December 1941–5 February 1942 and 10–24 March 1942)

- Breddan Airfield, Charters Towers, Queensland

19°56′34.21″S 146°14′21.44″E
38th Bombardment Group (Medium), (7 August – 29 September 1942)

71st Bombardment Squadron, (Medium) (12 August – September 1942)
405th Bombardment Squadron (Medium), (7 August – 29 September 1942)

- Brisbane Army Air Base, Queensland (Non-flying facility)

Brisbane AAB
Headquarters, 5th Air Force, ( – 17 March September 1942) (unmanned from March to August 1942)
Headquarters, Fifth Air Force, (18 September 1942 – 15 June 1944)
24th Pursuit Group (Interceptor) (May 1942 – 15 June 1944) (Not equipped or manned. See Historical Notes section)

Cairns Airport, Cairns, Queensland
16°52′29″S 145°45′08″E
33d Troop Carrier Squadron detachment, 374th Troop Carrier Group, (1 November – 10 December 1942)

- Charters Towers Airfield, Queensland

20°02′35″S 146°16′23″E
3d Bombardment Group (Light, 10 March-27 September 1942, and Dive, 28 September 1942 – 27 January 1943), (10 March 1942 – 27 January 1943)

8th Bombardment Squadron (Light & Dive), (17–30 March 1942 and 9 May 1942 – 27 January 1943)
13th Bombardment Squadron (Light & Dive), (10 March 1942 – 9 January 1943)
89th Bombardment Squadron (Light), (8 March-31 August 1942)
90th Bombardment Squadron, (Light & Dive) (8 March 1942 – 27 January 1943)

16th Bombardment Squadron Light, 27th Bombardment Group (Light)), (1 April – 4 May 1942)
17th Bombardment Squadron (Light) 27th Bombardment Group, (Light), ( – 4 April May 1942)
91st Bombardment Squadron (Light), 27th Bombardment Group (Light), (April-4 May 1942)
431st Fighter Squadron, 475th Fighter Group, (14 May – 30 June 1943)
432d Fighter Squadron, 475th Fighter Group, (14 May – 10 June 1943)
433d Fighter Squadron, 475th Fighter Group, (14 May – 16 June 1943)

- Charleville Airfield, Charleville, Queensland

26°24′48″S 146°15′45″E
63d Bombardment Squadron (Heavy), 43d Bombardment Group (Heavy), (15 June – 2 August 1942)

- Cloncurry Airfield, Cloncurry, Queensland

20°40′00″S 140°30′28″E
28th Bombardment Squadron (Heavy), 19th Bombardment Group (Heavy), (28 March – 4 May 1942) (Ground echelon attached to the 5th Interceptor Command (Provisional) on Bataan, Philippine Islands)
30th Bombardment Squadron (Heavy), 19th Bombardment Group (Heavy), (27 March – 12 May 1942) (Ground echelon attached to the 5th Interceptor Command (Provisional) on Bataan, Philippine Islands)
93d Bombardment Squadron (Heavy) 19th Bombardment Group (Heavy), (29 March – 17 May 1942) (Ground echelon attached to the 5th Interceptor Command (Provisional) on Bataan, Philippine Islands)

- Donnington Airfield, Woodstock, Queensland

19°36′04″S 146°50′27″E
22d Bombardment Group (Medium), (5 July 1942–28 September 1942 and 4 February 1943 – October 1943)

19th Bombardment Squadron, (4 July–15 September 1942 and 4 February – 10 July 1943)
33d Bombardment Squadron (Medium), (20 July – 28 September 1942 and 4 February – 14 October 1943)

35th Fighter Squadron, 8th Fighter Group, (29 June – 26 July 1942)
39th Fighter Squadron, 35th Fighter Group, (20 April – 1 June 1942)

- Doomben Field (Eagle Farm Airport), Eagle Farm, Queensland

27°25′30″S 153°05′03″E
8th Pursuit Group (Interceptor), (6 March – 14 May 1942)
8th Fighter Group, (15 May – 29 July 1942)

35th Pursuit Squadron (Interceptor), (6–25 March 1942)
36th Pursuit Squadron (Interceptor), (6–12 March 1942)
80th Pursuit Squadron (Interceptor), (6–27 March 1942)

38th Bombardment Group (Medium), (10 June – 6 August 1942)

69th Bombardment Squadron, (25 February – 7 March 1942) (Ground echelon only. Air echelon at Hickam Field, Oahu, Territory of Hawaii)
70th Bombardment Squadron (Medium), (25 February – 7 March 1942) (Ground echelon only. Air echelon in U.S.)
71st Bombardment Squadron (Medium), (25 February – 7 March 1942)
405th Bombardment Squadron (Medium), (25 February – 7 March 1942)

Queensland continued

- Iron Range Airfield, Kutini-Payamu National Park, Queensland

12°47′12″S 143°18′20″E
22d Bombardment Group (Medium), (29 September 1942 – 3 February 1943)

19th Bombardment Squadron (Medium), (15 September 1942 – 3 February 1943)
33d Bombardment Squadron (Medium), (29 September 1942 – 3 February 1943)

90th Bombardment Group (Heavy), (4 November 1942 – February 1943)

319th Bombardment Squadron (Heavy), (4 November 1942 – 1 February 1943)
320th Bombardment Squadron (Heavy), (4 November 1942 – 9 February 1943)
321st Bombardment Squadron (Heavy), (4 November 1942 – 9 February 1943)
400th Bombardment Squadron (Heavy), (4 November 1942 – 21 March 1943)

64th Bombardment Squadron (Heavy), 43d Bombardment Group (Heavy), (12 October – 7 November 1942)
65th Bombardment Squadron (Heavy), 43d Bombardment Group (Heavy), (13 October – 6 November 1942)
403d Bombardment Squadron (Heavy), 43d Bombardment Group (Heavy), (17 October – 22 November 1942)

- Longreach (Torrens Creek) Airfield, Longreach. Queensland

23°26′03″S 144°16′49″E
19th Bombardment Group (Heavy), (18 May – 23 July 1942)

28th Bombardment Squadron (Heavy), (5 May – 23 July 1942)
30th Bombardment Squadron (Heavy), (5 May – 24 July 1942)
93d Bombardment Squadron (Heavy), (18 May – 22 July 1942)

43d Bombardment Group (Heavy), (1 August – 13 September 1942)

63d Bombardment Squadron (Heavy), (3–19 August 1942)
65th Bombardment Squadron (Heavy), (15 August – 12 October 1942)
403d Bombardment Squadron (Heavy), (27 August – 16 October 1942)

- Lowood Airfield, Lowood, Queensland

27°27′51″S 152°29′19″E
36th Pursuit Squadron (Interceptor), 8th Pursuit Group (Interceptor), (6–12 March 1942
80th Pursuit Squadron (Interceptor), 8th Pursuit Group (Interceptor), (28 March-9 May 1942)

- Mareeba Airfield, Mareeba, Queensland

17°04′12″S 145°25′26″E
8th Fighter Group, (February-15 May 1943)

35th Fighter Squadron, (24 February-9 May 1943)
36th Fighter Squadron, (22 February-21 May 1943)
80th Fighter Squadron (6 February-20 March 1943)

19th Bombardment Group (Heavy), (24 July – 23 October 1942)

28th Bombardment Squadron (Heavy), (24 July – c. 18 November 1942)
30th Bombardment Squadron (Heavy), (24 July – ca. 10 November 1942)
93d Bombardment Squadron (Heavy), (23 July – c. 25 October 1942)

63d Bombardment Squadron (Heavy), 43d Bombardment Group (Heavy), (20 August 1942 – 22 January 1943)
64th Bombardment Squadron (Heavy), 43d Bombardment Group (Heavy), (8 November 1942 – 19 January 1943)
65th Bombardment Squadron (Heavy), 43d Bombardment Group (Heavy), (7 November 1942 – 19 January 1943)
403d Bombardment Squadron (Heavy), 43d Bombardment Group (Heavy), (21 January – 10 May 1943)

- Petrie Airfield, Petrie, Brisbane, Queensland

27°17′S 153°0.1′E
80th Pursuit Squadron (Interceptor), 8th Pursuit Group (Interceptor), (10–14 May 1942)
80th Fighter Squadron, 8th Fighter Group, (15 May – 19 July 1942)

- RAAF Base Amberley, Ipswich, Queensland

27°38′24″S 152°42′42″E
22d Bombardment Group (Medium), (7 March – 6 April 1942)

19th Bombardment Squadron (Medium) (2–28 March 1942)
33d Bombardment Squadron (Medium), (1–6 March 1942)

38th Bombardment Group (Medium), (30 April – 9 June 1942)

69th Bombardment Squadron (Medium), (30 April – 19 May 1942) (Ground echelon)
70th Bombardment Squadron (Medium), (20 April – 22 May 1942) (Ground echelon)

475th Fighter Group, 14 May – 13 August 1943

431st Fighter Squadron, (1 July – 13 August 1943)
432d Fighter Squadron, (11 June – 13 August 1943)
433d Fighter Squadron (17 June – 13 August 1943)

- RAAF Base Garbutt, Townsville, Queensland

19°15′12″S 146°45′54″E
Headquarters, V Bomber Command, (5 September–December 1942)
Headquarters, V Fighter Command, (November–December 1942)
8th Fighter Group, (29 July – 17 September 1942)

35th Fighter Squadron, (27 July – 17 September 1942)
36th Fighter Squadron, (4–25 April 1942 and 30 June – 17 September 1942)

19th Bombardment Group (Heavy), (18 April – 17 May 1942)

40th Reconnaissance Group (Heavy), (14 March-21 April 1942)
435th Bombardment Squadron (Heavy), (22 April-15 November 1942)

22d Bombardment Group (Medium), (7 April – 4 July 1942)

2d Bombardment Squadron (Medium) (7–8 April 1942)
18th Reconnaissance Squadron (Medium) (7–11 April 1942)
19th Bombardment Squadron (Medium) (29 March-3 July 1942)

38th Bombardment Group (Medium), (30 September – October 1942)

71st Bombardment Squadron (Medium), (1–28 October 1942)
405th Bombardment Squadron, (30 September – 25 October 1942)

317th Troop Carrier Group, (23 January – 29 September 1943)

39th Troop Carrier Squadron, (22 January-21 February 1943)
40th Troop Carrier Squadron, (23 January-3 October 1943)
41st Troop Carrier Squadron, (23 January-4 October 1943)
46th Troop Carrier Squadron, (23 January-30 September 1943)

374th Troop Carrier Group, (7 October 1943 – 11 August 1944)

6th Troop Carrier Squadron, (12 November 1942 – 26 August 1944)
22d Troop Carrier Squadron, (12 November 1942 – 23 January 1944)
33d Troop Carrier Squadron, (12 November 1943-April 1944)

6th Troop Carrier Squadron, 63d Troop Carrier Group, (2 October-11 November 1943)
8th Photographic Squadron, Allied Air Forces, Southwest Pacific Area (2 May – 8 June 1942)
8th Photographic Reconnaissance Squadron, Allied Air Forces, Southwest Pacific Area (9 June – 8 September 1942)
22d Bombardment Squadron, (Heavy), 7th Bombardment Group (Heavy), (20 February 1942 – 14 March 1942) (air echelon)
39th Fighter Squadron, 35th Fighter Group, (26 July – 17 October 1942)
40th Fighter Squadron, 35th Fighter Group, ( – 1 April June 1942 and 30 July – 24 November 1942)
88th Reconnaissance Squadron (Heavy) air echelon, 7th Bombardment Group (Heavy), (20 February 1942 – 14 March 1942)

- Reid River Airfield, Townsville, Queensland

19°45′45″S 146°50′40″E
2d Bombardment Squadron (Medium), 22d Bombardment Group (Medium), (9 April 1942 – 8 October 1943)
18th Reconnaissance Squadron (Medium), 22d Bombardment Group (Medium, (12–21 April 1942)
408th Bombardment Squadron (Medium), 22d Bombardment Group (Medium), (22 April 1942 – 14 October 1943)

New South Wales

- Bankstown Airfield, Bankstown, New South Wales

33°55′28″S 150°59′18″E
49th Pursuit Group (Interceptor), (16 February – 15 April 1942)

7th Pursuit Squadron (Interceptor), (16 February – 8 April 1942)

41st Pursuit Squadron (Interceptor), 35th Pursuit Group (Interceptor), (7 April – 14 May 1942)
41st Fighter Squadron, 35th Fighter Group, (15 May – 19 July 1942)

- RAAF Base Williamtown, Newcastle, New South Wales

32°47′42″S 151°50′04″E
9th Pursuit Squadron (Interceptor), 49th Pursuit Group (Interceptor), (14 February – 16 March 1942)
39th Pursuit Squadron (Interceptor), 35th Pursuit Group (Interceptor), (3–19 April 1942)
65th Bombardment Squadron (Heavy), 43d Bombardment Group (Heavy), (23 June – 14 August 1942)

- Sydney Airport, Sydney, New South Wales

33°56′46″S 151°10′38″E
6th Photographic Reconnaissance Group, (10 October – 26 November 1943)

25th Photographic Reconnaissance Squadron, (19–24 November 1943)
26th Photographic Reconnaissance Squadron, (19–24 November 1943)

35th Pursuit Group (Interceptor), (4–14 May 1942)
35th Fighter Group, (15 May – 22 July 1942)
43d Bombardment Group (Heavy), (28 March – 31 July 1942)

63d Bombardment Squadron (Heavy), (28 March – 14 June 1942)
64th Bombardment Squadron (Heavy), (16 March – 15 May 1942)
65th Bombardment Squadron (Heavy), (28 March – 22 June 1942)

58th Fighter Group, (19–20 November 1943)

South Australia

- Mount Gambier Airfield, Mount Gambier, South Australia

37°44′42″S 140°47′06″E
39th Pursuit Squadron (Interceptor), 35th Pursuit Group (Interceptor), (16 March – 2 April 1942)
40th Pursuit Squadron (Interceptor), 35th Pursuit Group (Interceptor), (16 March–April 1942)
41st Pursuit Squadron (Interceptor), 35th Pursuit Group (Interceptor), (17 March-6 April 1942)

Victoria

- Ballarat Airport, Ballarat, Victoria

37°30′42″S 143°47′28″E
38th Bombardment Group (Medium), (8 March – 29 April 1942)

69th Bombardment Squadron (Medium), (8 March – 29 April 1942) (Ground echelon)
70th Bombardment Squadron (Medium), (8 March – 20 April 1942) (Ground echelon)
71st Bombardment Squadron (Medium), (8 March – 29 April 1942)
405th Bombardment Squadron (Medium), (8 March – 7 August 1942)

39th Pursuit Squadron (Interceptor), 35th Pursuit Group (Interceptor), (8–15 March 1942)
40th Pursuit Squadron (Interceptor), 35th Pursuit Group (Interceptor), (9–15 March 1942)
41st Pursuit Squadron (Interceptor), 35th Pursuit Group (Interceptor), (8–17 March 1942)

- Essendon Airport, Melbourne, Victoria

37°43′41″S 144°54′07″E
Camp Darley (West of Melbourne)
19th Bombardment Group (Heavy), (2 March – 17 April 1942)

14th Bombardment Squadron (Heavy), 7th Bombardment Group (Heavy) (attached to 19th Bombardment Group (Heavy), (4–14 March 1942) (Air echelon only)
28th Bombardment Squadron (Heavy), 19th Bombardment Group (Heavy), (28 March-17 May 1942)(Detachment)
30th Bombardment Squadron (Heavy), (5–26 March 1942) (Air echelon only)
93d Bombardment Squadron (Heavy), (1–28 March 1942) (Air echelon only)

49th Pursuit Group (Interceptor), (2–15 February 1942)

7th Pursuit Squadron (Interceptor), (2–15 February 1942)
8th Pursuit Squadron (Interceptor), (2–15 February 1942)
9th Pursuit Squadron (Interceptor), (2–13 February 1942)

8th Photographic Squadron, Allied Air Forces, Southwest Pacific Area, (7–24 April 1942)
11th Bombardment Squadron (Heavy), 7th Bombardment Group (Heavy), (4 March – 6 April 1942)
13th Reconnaissance Squadron (Heavy), 43d Bombardment Group (Heavy), (27 February – 13 March 1942)
22d Transport Squadron, Air Transport Command, US Army Forces in Australia, (3 April 1942-4 July)
22d Troop Carrier Squadron, Air Transport Command, US Army Forces in Australia, (5 July-10 October 1942)

- RAAF Base Laverton, Laverton, Victoria

37°55′54″S 144°45′12″E
13th Reconnaissance Squadron (Heavy), 43d Bombardment Group (Heavy) (14–21 March 1942)
403d Bombardment Squadron (Heavy), 43d Bombardment Group (Heavy) (22 March-26 August 1942)

== Historical notes ==
- The 2nd Combat Cargo Group operated from Biak in the Dutch East Indies from May 1942 – May 1944 to fly passengers and cargo to US bases in Australia, the Admiralties and the Philippines.
- Six of the 7th Bombardment Group's B-17 Flying Fortresses left Hamilton Field, California on 6 December 1941, reaching Hickam Field, Hawaii during the Japanese attack but were able to land safely. Later in December the remainder of the air echelon flew B-17's from the United States to Java, with the unit establishing its headquarters in Australia. From 14 January to 4 March 1942, during the Japanese drive through the Philippines and Netherlands East Indies, the group operated from Java, being awarded a Distinguished Unit Citation for its action against enemy aircraft, ground installations, warships, and transports.
- On 7 December 1941 (8 December in the Philippines), when the Japanese first attacked Clark Field, the 19th Bombardment Group suffered numerous casualties and lost many planes. Late in December the air echelon moved to Australia to transport medical and other supplies to the Philippine Islands and evacuate personnel from that area. The men in Australia moved to Java at the end of 1941 and, flying B-17 Flying Fortress, LB-30, and B-24 Liberator aircraft, earned a Distinguished Unit Citation for the group by attacking enemy aircraft, ground installations, warships, and transports during the Japanese drive through the Philippines and Netherlands Indies early in 1942. The men returned to Australia from Java early in March 1942, and later that month the group evacuated Gen Douglas MacArthur, his family, and key members of his staff from the Philippines to Australia. After a brief rest the group resumed combat operations, participating in the Battle of the Coral Sea and raiding Japanese transportation, communications, and ground forces during the enemy's invasion of Papua New Guinea. From 7 to 12 August 1942 the 19th bombed airdromes, ground installations, and shipping near Rabaul, New Britain, being awarded another DUC for these missions. Captain Harl Pease, Jr. was posthumously awarded the Medal of Honor for his actions during 6–7 August 1942: when one engine of his bomber failed during a mission over New Britain, Captain Pease returned to Australia to obtain another plane; unable to find one fit for combat, he selected the most serviceable plane at the base and rejoined his squadron for an attack on a Japanese airdrome near Rabaul. By skillful flying he maintained his position in the formation and withstood enemy attacks until his bombs had been released on the objective; in the air battle that continued after the bombers left the target, Captain Pease's aircraft fell behind the formation and was lost. The group returned to the US late in 1942.
- The 24th Pursuit Group was wiped out on Luzon in the spring of 1942 during the Japanese invasion of the Philippines. Some pilots escaped to Australia where they were assigned to other units. The unit was never remanned or reequipped, but remained on active status until 2 April 1946

== Post World War II ==
In 1978, Australia and the United States established a Joint Geological and Geographical Research Station (JGGRS) in Alice Springs. The US Air Force "Detachment 421" was centred there, and were granted Freedom of Entry to the Town in 1995.

In 1981, Australia and the United States agreed to station up to three B-52 and six KC-135 aircraft, supported by about 100 US Air Force personnel and associated equipment at RAAF Base Darwin.

== See also ==
- Bakers Creek air crash
