= Mareeba Airfield =

Airport in Queensland, Australia

Mareeba Airfield Mareeba Airport
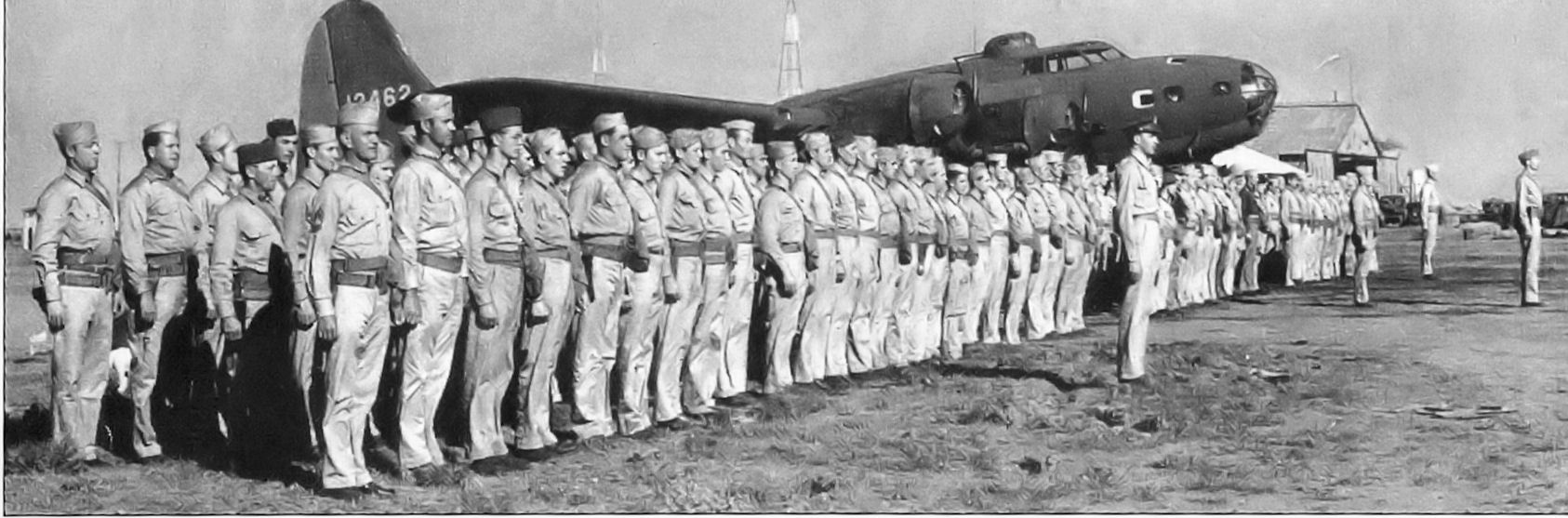
- USAAF 19th Bomb Group personnel on parade at Mareeba, with B-17E 41-2562 (Tojo's Jinx) (scrapped in New Guinea 1945) in late 1942
- IATA: MRG; ICAO: YMBA

Summary
- Airport type: Public
- Operator: Tablelands Regional Council
- Location: Mareeba, Queensland, Australia
- Elevation AMSL: 1,560 ft / 475 m
- Coordinates: 17°04′09″S 145°25′09″E

Map
- Location in Queensland

Runways
| Direction | Length | | Surface |
| Direction | m | ft | Surface |
|---|---|---|---|
| 10/28 | 1,505 | 4,938 | Asphalt |
- Sources: Australian AIP and aerodrome chart

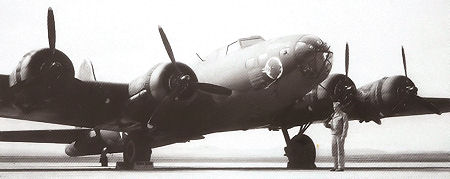
Boeing B-17E 41-2489 (Suzy-Q) of 19th Bomb Group, 93d Bomb Squadron, Mareeba, Australia, September 1942 This aircraft returned to the United States 23 October 1942, was scrapped and reduced to spares 15 July 1946.

Mareeba Airfield (IATA: MRG, ICAO: YMBA) is an airfield located 4.3 nautical miles (8.0 km; 4.9 mi) south of Mareeba, Queensland, Australia. Built in 1942 as a US Army Air Force base during World War II, the airfield had two runways, with a complement of taxiways, hardstands and a containment area. After the war, much of the airfield reverted to agricultural use, while the southern runway remains as an active airfield.

== History ==
=== World War II ===
A major US Army Air Force Base during World War II, Mareeba housed both heavy bomber and fighter squadrons of that Service in 1942 and 1943. The Americans referred to it as Hoevet Field in honor of Major Dean Carol "Pinky" Hoevet who was killed on 16 August 1942. Known USAAF units assigned were:

- 19th Bombardment Group, (Headquarters) (24 July 1942 – 23 October 1943)

28th Bombardment Squadron B-17 Flying Fortress, (23 July 1942 – 25 October 1943)
30th Bombardment Squadron B-17 Flying Fortress, (23 July 1942 – 25 October 1943)
93d Bombardment Squadron B-17 Flying Fortress, (23 July 1942 – 25 October 1943)

- 63d Bombardment Squadron B-17 Flying Fortress (43d Bombardment Group), (20 August 1942 – 23 January 1943)
- 64th Bombardment Squadron B-17 Flying Fortress (43d Bombardment Group), (8 November 1942 – 20 January 1943)
- 65th Bombardment Squadron B-17 Flying Fortress (43d Bombardment Group), (7 November 1942 – 20 January 1943)
- 403d Bombardment Squadron B-17 Flying Fortress (43d Bombardment Group), (21 January – 11 May 1943)
- 8th Fighter Group, (Headquarters) (February–16 May 1943)

35th Fighter Squadron, P-39 Airacobra (24 February – May 1943)
36th Fighter Squadron, P-39 Airacobra (22 February – 22 May 1943)
80th Fighter Squadron, P-39 Airacobra (6 February – 21 March 1943)

The airfield became operational in May 1942 with the first lodger unit being 100 Squadron RAAF. Following their departure in early July, the airfield was occupied by USAAF heavy bomber squadrons from the US 5th Air Force which flew hundreds of bombing raids on enemy targets in the South Pacific; most notably Rabaul. With the departure of the American units, Mareeba was used by No 5 Communication Unit and a variety of Royal Australian Air Force (RAAF) support units, with No 24 Operational Base Unit disbanding in early 1946.

=== Modern use ===
Today, the airfield hosts a museum with several World War II vintage airplanes on display in a flyable condition, and a major maintenance facility for Mission Aviation Fellowship. The airfield is home for the North Queensland Aero Club.

== See also ==
- United States Army Air Forces in Australia (World War II)
- List of airports in Queensland
