= Credit Rating Information and Services Limited =

Credit rating company in Bangladesh

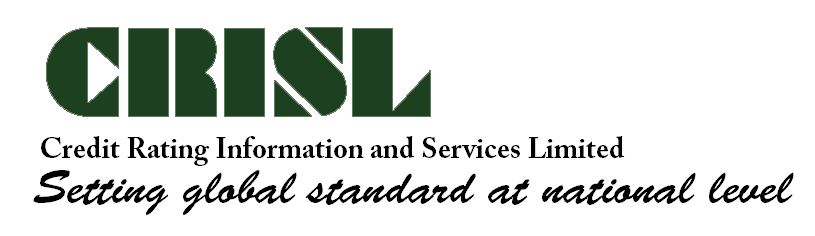
Credit Rating Information and Services Limited

Credit Rating Information and Services Limited (CRISL) is the first credit rating company in Bangladesh. This company was incorporated with the Registrar of Joint Stock Companies in 1992 and Credit Rating Company rules 1996 as a recognized ECAI, and has been operating as the first rating company in the country since 1995.

== Rating history in Bangladesh ==
Initially, all credit risk assessments were done internally by SEC Bangladesh (Security Exchange Commission of Bangladesh). which acts as the regulatory body of the external rating institutions. This scenario has been changing slowly as dependency and trust on ECAI is growing stronger.

== Bank loan exposure rating in Bangladesh ==
Financing in Bangladesh economy is more bank loan oriented compared to capital market or bond market. Clients prefer availing banking facilities to finance their business for its easy accessibility and business-friendly relationship. In addition, the private sector is more "private limited", company oriented and structurally accessible to capital market for private limited companies is not open. Therefore, these companies are not required to go through stringent regulatory compliance to get finance. However, commercial banks are required to assess risk in standard format against all loans before the same is sanctioned. Considering the increase in risk in all economic sectors due to various reasons, the central bank asked all commercial banks to assess the client risk and tie the same with its capital adequacy requirement. This risks are to be assessed by External Credit Assessment Institutions (ECAI) as recognized by the Bangladesh Bank under Basel II Capital Adequacy framework.

The 'Capital Adequacy' for bank simply means, a bank must have adequate capital for risk absorption that are arising from various risks including financing.

Under Basel II Capital adequacy framework as adopted by Bangladesh Bank vide Circular No 9 dated 31 December 2008 and subsequently revised on December 29, 2010, the risk weight is to be carried out on the basis of the ratings of ECAI. If loans are not rated, for Tk 100 corporate exposure/loan, the risk weighted assets would be Tk. 125 (125% of the exposure) which translates to 12.5% capital requirement. The above is only in respect of credit risk. Bangladesh Bank also asked the scheduled banks to maintain capital for Operational Risk as well as for Market Risk. The above Bangladesh Bank circular warrants the banks to have more capital compared to the present amount in the bank reserves. Therefore, banks will be required to rate its loan portfolio by recognized rating agencies in order to keep the capital requirement lower.

== Status of rating agencies in Bangladesh ==
Bangladesh Bank has currently given recognition to Seven Credit Rating companies.

== See also ==
- International Ratings Group
- Credit rating
- Basel II
