= International Resources Group =

- Industry: professional services firm
- Founded: 1978
- Successor: RTI International
- Area served: Worldwide

The International Resources Group (IRG) is an international professional services firm that is a contractor to governments and international organizations focusing on Energy, Learning and Institutional Strengthening, Climate, Natural Resources and Biodiversity, Water, and Agriculture. Since its inception in 1978, IRG has completed over 600 contracts in more than 120 countries.

IRG was one of the first firms given contracts for the reconstruction of Iraq, winning a $7 million contract from the U.S. government through USAID. IRG has also provided development assistance in Liberia. Other contracts have been in places such as Aceh and Afghanistan. IRG was the implementation partner for USAID Power Distribution Program (PDP) in Pakistan from 2010 to 2015.

In 2013, International Resources Group was purchased by Engility Corporation, a spin-off of L-3 Communications. It was announced in 2017 that IRG was acquired by RTI International from Engility Corporation.
