= 70th Flying Training Squadron =

70th Flying Training Squadron

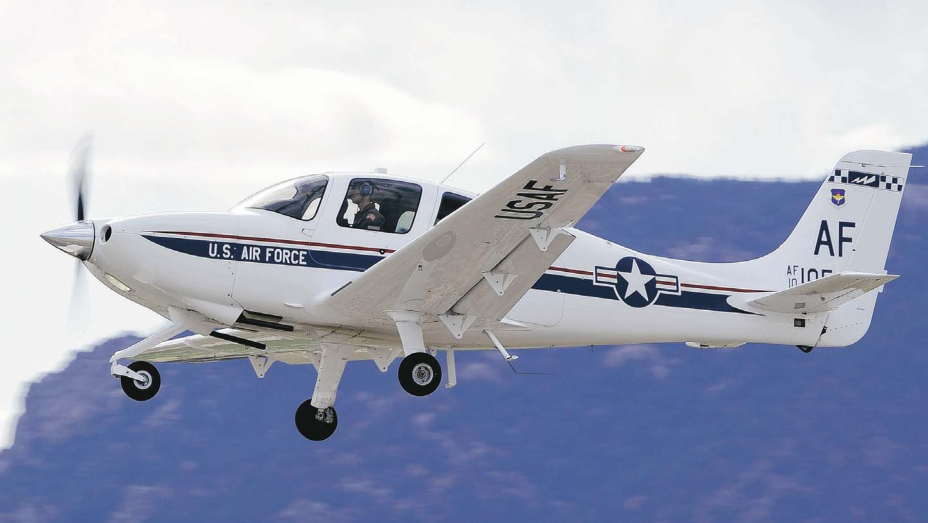
- Cirrus T-53 used in airmanship training at the USAF Academy
- Active: 1941–1946; 1953–1966; 1972–1973; 1973–1975; 2005–present
- Country: United States
- Branch: United States Air Force
- Role: Airmanship Training
- Part of: Air Force Reserve Command
- Garrison/HQ: United States Air Force Academy
- Motto(s): Duces Volantes (Latin for 'Flying Leaders')
- Engagements: Southwest Pacific Theater
- Decorations: Distinguished Unit Citation; Philippine Republic Presidential Unit Citation

Commanders
- Current commander: Lieutenant Colonel Rodriguez

Insignia
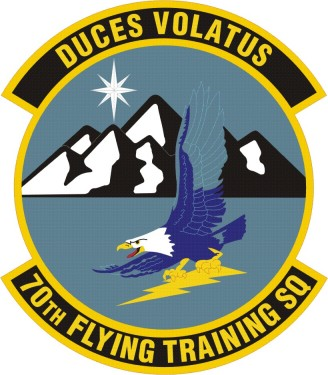
- 70th Flying Training Squadron emblem (Note: Approved 16 November 2006.)

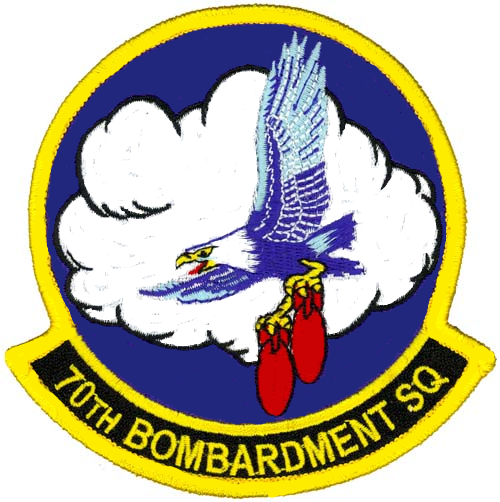
- 70th Bombardment Squadron emblem (SAC era) (Note: Air Force regulations required that the World War II emblem be placed on a disc. The date this change was made is undetermined.)

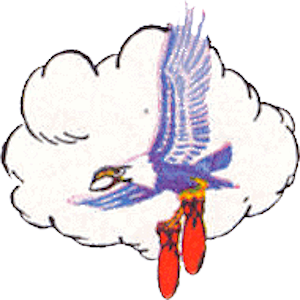
- 70th Bombardment Squadron emblem (Note: Approved 15 June 1942. Description: In front of, over and beyond black clouds, ablue and white hawk with red tongue and yellow beak, eye and feet, carrying a red aerial bomb in each foot.)

The 70th Flying Training Squadron is reserve unit of the United States Air Force based at the United States Air Force Academy, Colorado.

The squadron augments the 94th Flying Training Squadron for glider training, augments the parachuting element of training for the 98th Flying Training Squadron, and supports the 557th Flying Training Squadron by assisting the cadet flying team compete at a national intercollegiate level as well as providing oversight in the academy flight screening program.

== Mission ==
The 70th Squadron is an associate unit operating under the "Total Force Integration" program, providing flight and parachute instruction with reserve airmen. It provides experienced reserve instructors corps training for United States Air Force Academy cadets in the fundamentals of airmanship, instruction, and leadership.

== History ==
=== World War II ===
==== Initial organization and training ====
The squadron was first activated on 15 January 1941 at Langley Field, Virginia as the 70th Bombardment Squadron, one of the three original bombardment squadrons of the 38th Bombardment Group. The squadron trained with Martin B-26 Marauders, but also flew Douglas B-18 Bolos. In June 1941, the squadron moved to Jackson Army Air Base, Mississippi.

Shortly after the attack on Pearl Harbor, on 19 January 1942, the ground echelon of the squadron departed for Australia. The air echelon remained at Jackson and continued training until June 1942, when it departed for the Southwest Pacific Theater, However, when the squadron reached the Hawaiian Islands, it was detained there and participated in the defense of Midway Island. Although it was not formally reassigned from the 38th Group until 1943, it was no longer under the control of the 38th from this time.

==== Combat in the Pacific ====
Deployed to South Pacific Area; being assigned to Thirteenth Air Force and attacking enemy targets in the Solomon Islands; New Hebrides and other enemy locations north and east of Papua New Guinea. Became part of Mac Arthur's New Guinea campaign, supported Army ground forces with tactical bombing of enemy formations and targets along the northern coast of New Guinea and in the Dutch East Indies.

Attacked enemy forces in the Philippines during early 1945 as part of the liberation from Japanese control; continued combat missions until the Japanese capitulation in August 1945. Became part of the Fifth Air Force forces in Occupied Japan in 1946 before being demobilized and inactivated in May 1946.

The 70th was awarded a Distinguished Unit Citation for its pre-invasion bombing of Balikpapan between 23 and 30 June 1945. Balikpapan was a center for oil refining on Borneo held by the Japanese. These attacks included bombing and strafing enemy shore installations. The round trip to the target was over 1700 miles and was among the longest flown by medium bombers during the war. Pre mission experiments determined that the squadron's bombers could carry a bomb load over this distance with fuel tanks installed in their radio compartments despite having to take off from a runway damaged by enemy action. Four of the missions encountered severe tropical weather fronts. Despite intense and accurate flak, the squadron destroyed gun positions, warehouses, roadblocks, fuel and ammunition dumps, a radar station as well as huge stores of gasoline and oil which the enemy had placed in position to be released into shallow pits oil the beach and ignited when the Australian ground troops made their assaults. The group attacked the beach while naval underwater demolition teams operated offshore without losing a man. The attacks were so effective that the Australian Seventh Division was able to come ashore without enemy opposition.

=== Cold War ===
Reactivated as a Strategic Air Command Convair B-36 Peacemaker bombardment squadron in 1953. Engaged in worldwide training missions with the B-36 until 1956 when re-equipped with the jet Boeing B-52 Stratofortress. Deployed to Western Pacific during the Vietnam War and flew conventional Operation Arc Light bombardment missions over enemy military and industrial targets in North Vietnam. Inactivated in 1966 due to budget reductions.

=== Pilot training ===
Reactivated as an Undergraduate Pilot Training Cessna T-37 Tweet squadron in 1972. Remained in Air Training Command providing initial flight training first at Laredo Air Force Base, then at Moody Air Force Base. Inactivated in 1975 when Moody was transferred to Tactical Air Command as a fighter base.

Reactivated in the reserve at the United States Air Force Academy in 2005 as a pilot screening squadron, replacing Detachment 1, 302nd Operations Group. Also flies unpowered gliders.

== Lineage ==
- Constituted as the 70th Bombardment Squadron (Medium) on 20 November 1940

Activated on 15 January 1941
Redesignated 70th Bombardment Squadron, Medium on 19 September 1944
Inactivated on 10 May 1946

- Redesignated 70th Bombardment Squadron, Heavy on 19 February 1953

Activated on 25 February 1953
Discontinued and inactivated, on 25 June 1966

- Redesignated 70th Flying Training Squadron on 22 March 1972

Activated on 1 August 1972
Inactivated on 30 September 1973
Activated on 1 December 1973
Inactivated on 1 December 1975

- Activated on 22 October 2005

=== Assignments ===
- 38th Bombardment Group, 15 January 1941
- 42d Bombardment Group, 26 February 1943 – 10 May 1946
- 42d Bombardment Wing, 25 February 1953 – 25 June 1966
- 38th Flying Training Wing, 1 August 1972 – 30 September 1973
- 38th Flying Training Wing, 1 December 1973 – 1 December 1975
- 302d Operations Group, 22 October 2005
- 340th Flying Training Group 1 September 2007 – present

=== Stations ===
- Langley Field, Virginia, 15 January 1941
- Jackson Army Air Base, Mississippi, c. 5 June 1941 – 19 January 1942 (operated from Hunter Field, Georgia, 8–14 December 1941)
- Doomben Field, Australia, 25 February 1942 (air echelon remained in the U.S. until 2 June 1942)
- Ballarat Airport, Australia, 8 March 1942
- RAAF Base Amberley, Australia, c. 20 April 1942
- Fiji, 23 May 1942 (air echelon at Hickam Field, Hawaii, 2 June-8 July 1942, operated from: Luganville Airfield, Espiritu Santo, New Hebrides, 14–18 November 1942, Carney Airfield, Guadalcanal, Solomon Islands, 9 January-4 February 1943, 16 August-20 October 1943)
- Russell Islands, 22 October 1943
- Stirling Airfield, Solomon Islands, 20 January 1944
- Hollandia Airfield Complex, New Guinea, 14 August 1944
- Sansapor Airfield, New Guinea, 14 August 1944 (operated from Wama Airfield, Morotai, Netherlands East Indies, c. 22 February-13 March 1945)
- Puerto Princesa Airfield, Palawan, Philippines, 26 March 1945
- Itami Air Base, Japan, 31 January-10 May 1946
- Limestone Air Force Base (later Loring Air Force Base), Maine, 25 February 1953 – 25 June 1966
- Laredo Air Force Base, Texas, 1 August 1972 – 30 September 1973
- Moody Air Force Base, Georgia, 1 December 1973 – 1 December 1975
- United States Air Force Academy, Colorado, 22 October 2005 – present

=== Aircraft ===
- Douglas B-18 Bolo (1941)
- Martin B-26 Marauder (1941–1943)
- North American B-25 Mitchell (1943–1945)
- Convair B-36 Peacemaker (1953–1956)
- Boeing B-52 Stratofortress (1956–1966)
- Cessna T-37 Tweet (1972–1973, 1973–1975)

== See also ==
- United States Army Air Forces in Australia
- List of B-52 Units of the United States Air Force
