= Interest rate guarantee =

An interest rate guarantee (IRG) is an option on a forward rate agreement (FRA) that is handled over-the-counter (OTC). A call IRG is called a borrower's IRG or borrower option (BO).

A put IRG is called a lender's IRG. As with all options, the seller has the obligation to fulfill the condition of the option.

- When exercising a borrower's IRG, the holder has the option (but is not obliged) to take a loan with a predetermined amount at a predetermined interest rate (the strike of the option) on a predetermined time period.
- When exercising a Lender's IRG, the holder has the option (but is not obliged) to make a loan with a predetermined amount at a predetermined interest rate (the strike of the option) on a predetermined time period.

In the residential mortgage industry, an interest rate guarantee is also called a locked in rate.

== Relationship to caps and floors ==
In interest-rate derivatives markets, an interest rate guarantee corresponds to a single-period option on a forward rate and is closely related to the building blocks of caps and floors. A Bank of England overview of over-the-counter interest-rate options notes that options on forward-rate agreements are known as interest rate guarantees (IRGs) or interest rate caplets.

In market practice, a cap is constructed as a series of call options on successive forward rates, while a floor is constructed as a series of put options on successive forward rates. An individual IRG therefore corresponds to one of the component option periods within a cap or floor structure.
