= Satellite IRG =

Satcoms Innovation Group
- Formation: 1997 as SUIRG; restructured and renamed in 2011 as "Satellite IRG" and then as "Satcoms Innovation Group" in 2018.
- Type: Satellite Industry Association
- Headquarters: Ledbury, Herefordshire, UK
- Managing Director: Helen Weedon
- Website: http://www.satig.space

The Satellite Interference Reduction Group (sIRG) is a global satellite trade organization now known as the Satcoms Innovation Group. Its original remit was to combat the increasing and costly problem of satellite Radio Frequency Interference (RFI). Having spearheaded a number of global initiatives to further innovation and technology to combat this problem, as well as raising awareness for both the problem and the available solutions, the group changed its name in October 2018 in order to widen its remit. Satellite interference remains an important topic, however, resolution is becoming easier and quicker, while the satellite industry is facing other challenges that need attention. By widening its remit, the group is able to spend time tackling those areas.

The group's membership is made up of satellite operators and equipment manufacturers. Its main aim is to foster relationships between operators and manufacturers, solutions providers and users and create a forum for debate, through workshops and events, as well as sharing industry news and developments through its own channels.

SIG works closely with other industry associations, including APSCC, CASBAA, GVF, WBU-ISOG and maintains a vital link between the satellite operators, manufacturers and their clients.

== History ==
The Satcoms Innovation Group was originally known as Satellite Users Interference Reduction Group, often referred to as SUIRG. The name and acronym changed to the Satellite Interference Reduction Group in 2011 and to the present usage in 2018. SIG was established jointly by Inmarsat, Intelsat, PanAmSat, QinetiQ, Glowlink, and SES World Skies (then known as New Skies).
