= International Ratings Group =

Credit ratings agency

International Ratings Group is an international rating agency grouping established at the end of 2005, following a comprehensive study undertaken on the total global ratings industry. The study demonstrated the need for a truly international ratings group which focuses exclusively on Emerging Markets (i.e. Africa, Middle East, Eastern Europe, South America, and Asia).

Accordingly, the basic objective was to bring together a number of independent regional agencies, with a view to agreeing on common rating standards, methodologies & symbols, and operating under a single “brand”. The ultimate end goal is the establishment of a single international ratings group covering all the emerging markets.

== Founding members and regional coverage ==
IRG has been established with three founding partners:

- Global Credit Rating (GCR) is the largest rating agency in Africa, accounting for over 60% of all ratings accorded on the continent. GCR’s Head Office is in South Africa with its main SADC, East, West, & Central Africa regional offices in Zimbabwe, Kenya, Nigeria & Zambia, respectively, with a Francophone office being established in Senegal.
- Pacific Credit Rating (PCR), is a Latin American rating agency offering a complete product range of local and international credit ratings. With offices based in Bolivia, Costa Rica, Ecuador, El Salvador, Panama, and Peru, and new offices currently being established in Colombia, Dominican Republic, Honduras, Guatemala, and Nicaragua. PCR is the only independent regional rating agency covering the Latin American market on a regional basis.
- JCR-VIS Credit Rating Co. Ltd. (JCR-VIS) is operating as a "Full Service" rating agency and enjoys the largest market share in Pakistan. JCR-VIS is a joint venture between Japan Credit Rating Agency, Ltd. (JCR) - Japan's premier rating agency, and Vital Information Services (Pvt.) Limited (VIS) - Pakistan's only data bank and financial research organization. JCR-VIS is a joint venture partner in Credit Rating Information and Services Limited (CRISL) located in Bangladesh and a founding shareholder in the Islamic International Rating Agency (IIRA), in Bahrain.
