= Bootless Inlet =

- Location within Papua New Guinea
- Coordinates: 9.504444°S 147.262778°E
- Islands: Motupore Island, Loloata Island, Manunouha Island, and Bunamotu Island.

Bootless Inlet or Bootless Bay is a body of water in south-eastern Papua New Guinea, approximately 20 kilometres (12 mi) southeast of Port Moresby. There are four islands in the bay: Motupore Island, Loloata Island, Manunouha Island, and Bunamotu Island. A barrier reef across the mouth of the inlet protects it from rough seas. Several small creeks empty into the bay, but no large rivers.

== History ==
During World War II, the Australian Army laid land mines along the shore of the inlet near Port Moresby, which later needed to be cleared by divers.

== Flora and fauna ==
Numerous species of fish, shellfish, and turtles may be found in Bootless Bay, and historical evidence indicates that dugongs and crocodiles were once present as well. The islands within the bay are home to various species of reef corals and sponges.

In 1989, Motupore Island was proposed as an International Union for Conservation of Nature (IUCN) Wildlife Management Area. There is a University of Papua New Guinea research station on the island.
