= Lockhart River Airport =

Airport in Queensland, Australia

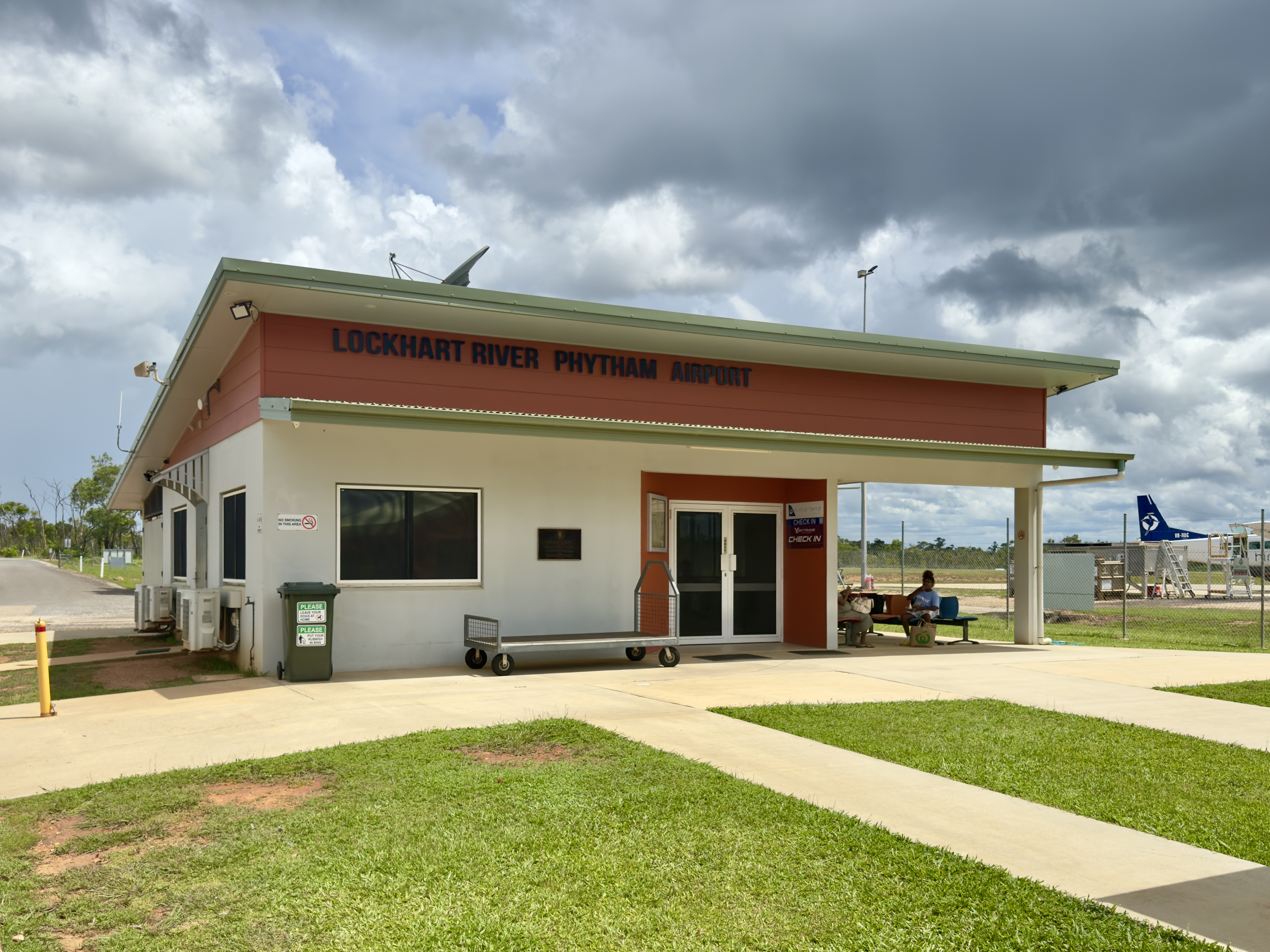
- IATA: IRG; ICAO: YLHR

Summary
- Airport type: Public
- Operator: Lockhart River Aerodrome Company Pty Ltd
- Location: Lockhart River
- Elevation AMSL: 77 ft / 23 m
- Coordinates: 12°47′13″S 143°18′17″E

Map
- Location in Queensland

Runways
Direction	Length		Surface
Direction	m	ft	Surface
12/30	1,500	4,921	Asphalt
- Sources: Australian AIP and aerodrome chart

Lockhart River Airport (IATA: IRG, ICAO: YLHR) (also known as Iron Range Airport) is an airport in Lockhart River, Queensland, Australia, located approximately 800 km (500 mi) north of Cairns on the eastern coast of Cape York Peninsula. Being so remote with the road to Lockhart River being unpassable during the tropical wet season, the airport provides a vital transport hub for the community as well as being the only means of freighting in critical medical and other supplies during the summer months.

== History ==
The airport was constructed during World War II, and was used as a bomber and communications base for many years. Known World War II United States Army Air Forces Fifth Air Force units assigned to Iron Range Airport were:

- 22d Bombardment Group, (29 September 1942 – 4 February 1943)

19th Bombardment Squadron, (15 September 1942 – 4 February 1943) B-26 Marauder
33d Bombardment Squadron, (29 September 1942 – 4 February 1943) B-26 Marauder

- 90th Bombardment Group, (November 1942 – February 1943) (Headquarters)
- 64th Bombardment Squadron (43d Bombardment Group), (12 October – 8 November 1942) B-17 Flying Fortress
- 65th Bombardment Squadron (43d Bombardment Group), (13 October – 7 November 1942) B-17 Flying Fortress
- 403d Bombardment Squadron (43d Bombardment Group), (17 October – 23 November 1942) B-17 Flying Fortress

In addition, the 479th Service Squadron provided supplies for the B-26 and B-17s assigned to the airport, as well as operating a repair and maintenance depot for B-24 Liberator aircraft.

== Airlines and destinations ==
Airlines	Destinations
Skytrans Australia	Aurukun, Cairns, Weipa

== Accidents and incidents ==
On 7 May 2005 a Fairchild Metroliner aircraft crashed 6 nautical miles (11 km; 6.9 mi) north-west of Lockhart River Airport, killing all 15 people on board. The aircraft had flown from Bamaga and was preparing to land at the airport.

== See also ==
- United States Army Air Forces in Australia (World War II)
- List of airports in Queensland
