= 19th Special Operations Squadron =

19th Special Operations Squadron

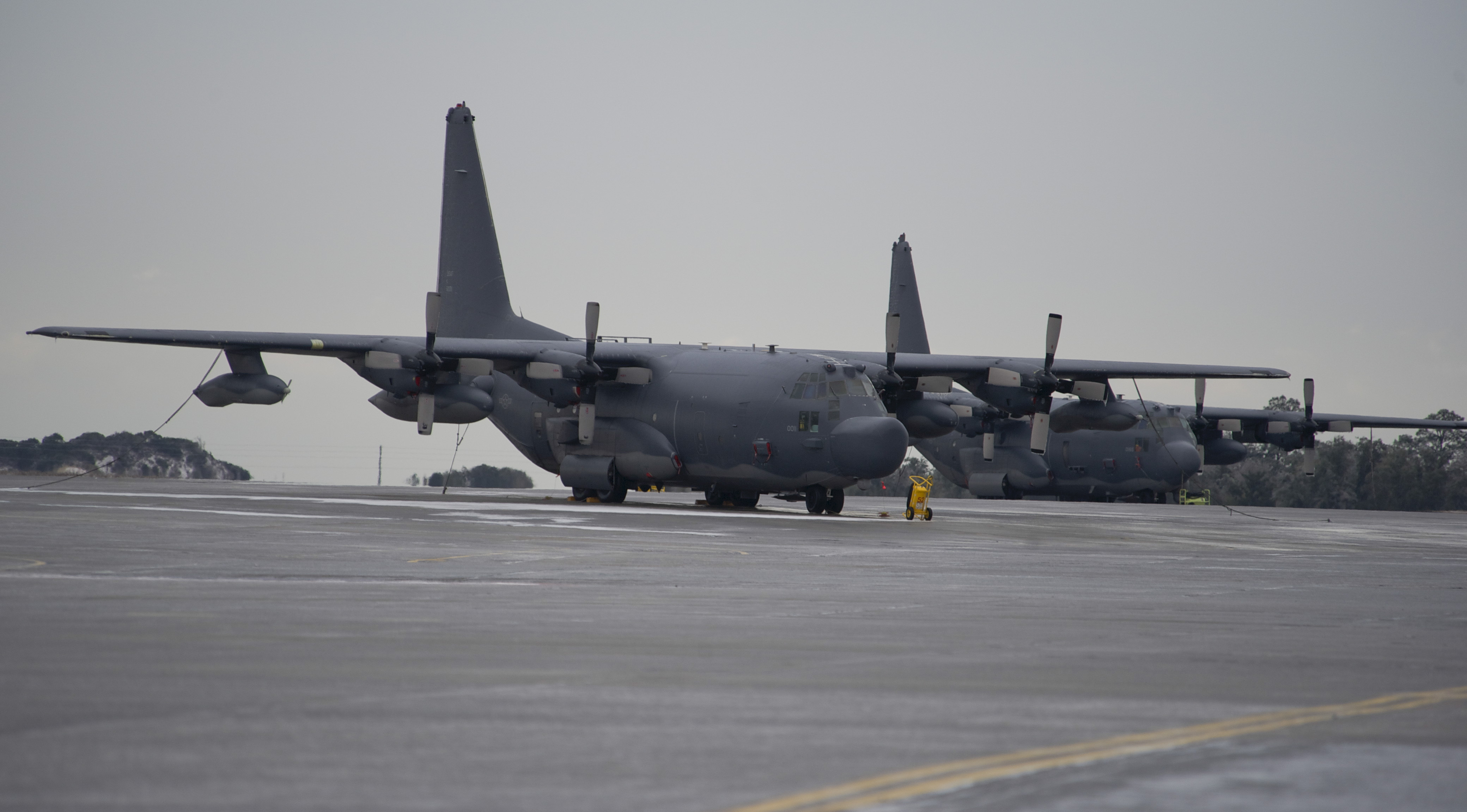
- MC-130s at Hurlburt Field
- Active: 1940–1963; 1964–1971; 1996–present
- Country: United States
- Branch: United States Air Force
- Role: Special Operations
- Part of: 492nd Special Operations Wing
- Garrison/HQ: Hurlburt Field
- Mottos: Deeds, Not Words (1964–1971)
- Engagements: Admiralty Islands campaign Battle of Khe Sanh
- Decorations: Presidential Unit Citation; Navy Presidential Unit Citation; Gallant Unit Citation; Air Force Outstanding Unit Award with Combat "V" Device; Air Force Outstanding Unit Award; Philippine Presidential Unit Citation; Republic of Korea Presidential Unit Citation; Republic of Vietnam Gallantry Cross with Palm

Insignia
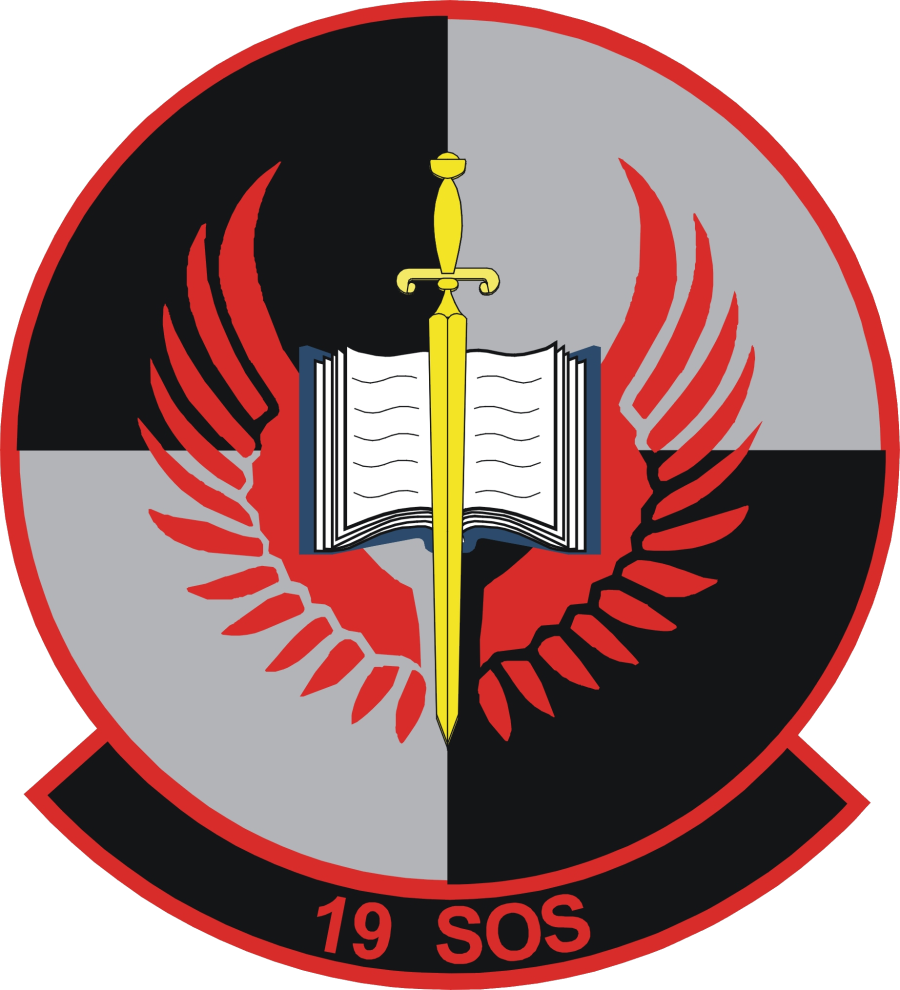
- 19th Special Operations Squadron emblem (Note: Approved 23 August 1996.)

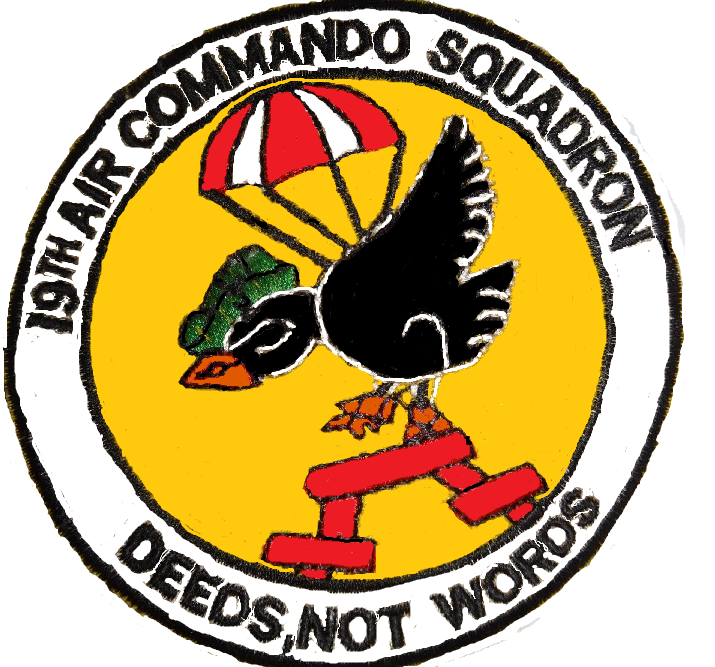
- 19th Air Commando Sq emblem

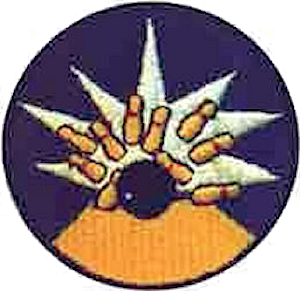
- Patch with 19th Bombardment Squadron emblem (Note: Approved 19 September 1941.)

The 19th Special Operations Squadron is an Air Force Special Operations Command unit, part of the 492nd Special Operations Wing at Hurlburt Field, Florida. It conducts crew training for AC-130 and Lockheed MC-130 aircraft.

== History ==
=== World War II ===
The 19th was established as a GHQ Air Force medium bomber squadron in 1940 as a result of the buildup of the United States Army Air Corps after the outbreak of World War II in Europe. It trained with a mix of Douglas B-18 Bolos and Martin B-26 Marauders.

After the attack on Pearl Harbor brought the USA into World War II, the squadron was transferred to the West Coast, flying anti-submarine patrols from Muroc Army Air Field, California from December 1941 to the end of January 1942. It was then assigned to the new Fifth Air Force, originally based on the Philippines. Leaving the B-18s at Muroc, the squadron moved to the South Pacific where it flew its first combat missions from Garbutt Field, Townsville, Australia, against Rabaul, New Britain. In addition to frequent raids against Rabaul, the 19th flew against enemy shipping, facilities, and troop concentrations in New Guinea and provided close air support for Allied troops fighting there, until being withdrawn from combat in January 1943. With refurbished B-26s, the 19th moved to New Guinea and returned to combat in mid-July 1943.

The squadron was again re-equipped, with Consolidated B-24 Liberators, in early 1944, then returned to combat status on 10 March 1944 with a raid against Manus Island. Most operations were against targets in the Bismarck Archipelago until the 19th moved to Owi Island in late July. The squadron flew its first mission to the Philippines Islands on 1 September 1944, hitting Japanese installations at Davao, Mindanao. The B-24s hit enemy facilities in the Celebes and on Mindanao, with an occasional raid against the oil refineries at Balikpapan, Borneo. Raids continued until the squadron moved in early December 1944 to Angaur, Palau Islands. From this station, the B-24s bombed targets throughout the Philippines. In January 1945, the 19th moved to Samar Island, Philippines, before finally relocating in March to Clark Field. In the meantime, in mid-February, the 19th raided Formosa for the first time, and on 21 March, flew its first mission into China. In June 1945, for a week, the B-24s flew from Puerta Princesa, Palawan Island, to hit targets on Borneo in support of Australian forces landing there. The 19th flew its last bombing mission of the war on 18 July 1945, to Formosa. In August the squadron moved to Okinawa and flew reconnaissance missions over Japan.

The 19th flew training missions in the Far East until being moved to Smoky Hill Air Force Base, Kansas, in May 1946. It deployed to England in November 1946, where it flew training missions to Accra, West Africa, Aden, Yemen, and Arabia, returning in February 1947 to Smoky Hill AFB, then to March Air Force Base, California in May. The 19th again deployed to England from November 1949 to February 1950 where the squadron flew training sorties to Germany and Dhahran, Saudi Arabia.

=== Korean War ===
The squadron then deployed in July 1950 to Kadena Air Base, Okinawa, and flew its first combat mission over Korea on 13 July, hitting marshaling yards at Wonsan, North Korea. Bombing missions over both North Korea and South Korea followed, with targets such as bridges, industrial facilities, and railroads. The squadron flew its last combat mission on 19 October, and returned to the USA on 30 October.

Back at March AFB, the 19th trained Boeing B-29 Superfortress crews to be sent to the Far East Air Forces for combat duty in Korea. In February 1953, the 19th replaced its B-29s with Boeing B-47 Stratojet bombers. The 19 BS made its last deployment to England between December 1953 and March 1954, flying training missions to Sidi Slimane and French Morocco. Later the 19th deployed from April–June 1957 to Andersen Air Force Base, Guam, and from there, flew missions to Japan and Korea. In November 1957, the 19th BS received a forward alert obligation, initially sending five B-47s to Eielson Air Force Base, Alaska, for six months of cold weather training, then rotating a single aircraft with aircrew for two to four weeks at a time. The alert aircraft were sent in November 1958 to Elmendorf Air Force Base, Alaska, and then in January 1959 to Andersen AFB, Guam. The 19th ceased operational flying in February 1963 and ferried its B-47s to other units and was inactivated on 15 March 1963.

=== Vietnam War ===
The 19th Air Commando Squadron was organized on 8 October 1964, at Tan Son Nhut Air Base, just outside Saigon, South Vietnam. The 19th received Fairchild C-123 Provider aircraft and personnel in 1964 but did not become operational as a unit until March 1965. It flew combat missions including cargo drops, flare missions at night in support of hamlets and outposts under attack, transporting troops and supplies to combat areas, and air evacuation of wounded and refugees from battle areas. Cargo included munitions, vehicles, spare parts, fuel and various foods. Missions were flown in support of the U.S. Air Force, U.S. Army, United States Navy, U.S. Marines and South Vietnamese forces. A Royal Thai Air Force contingent was attached to the squadron from mid-1966 until inactivation. Whenever Tan Son Nhut Air Base came under rocket and mortar attacks, the 19th would operate for up to two weeks at a time from Phan Rang Air Base. The 19th also flew increased missions during the Tet Offensive of 1968 and shared in a Navy Presidential Unit Citation for support to U.S. Marines defending Khe Sanh from January to March 1968. In June to August 1970, the 19th flew airlift, airdrop, and evacuation missions in support of Allied forces fighting in Cambodia. On 19 April 1971, the 19 SOS began to transfer the C-123s to South Vietnam and the squadron flew its last combat mission on 30 April. The 19th ceased all operations in early May and was inactivated on 10 June 1971. On 19 September 1985, the unit was redesignated and combined with the 19th Tactical Intelligence Squadron.

=== Modern era ===
The 19th SOS was reactivated on 24 May 1996, at Hurlburt Field. It currently conducts all formal aircrew training for the AC-130U and U-28A Draco. That training includes the initial mission qualification, requalification, aircraft commander upgrade, instructor upgrade and refresher training. Additionally, the 19th SOS provides training for the CV-22, C-145, MC-130H, and will soon be training all AC-130J aircrew. The 19th SOS uses advanced aircrew training devices (simulators) as well as training coded aircraft for flight and ground training. The Special Operations Forces Aircrew Training System contractor provides the 19 SOS administrative support to training operations, courseware development and maintenance, classroom and flightline instruction and operations and maintenance of training and mission rehearsal devices.

=== Operations ===
- World War II
- Korean War
- Vietnam War

== Lineage ==
19th Bombardment Squadron

- Constituted as the 19th Bombardment Squadron (Medium) on 22 December 1939

Activated on 1 February 1940
Redesignated 19th Bombardment Squadron, Heavy on 3 February 1944
Redesignated 19th Bombardment Squadron, Very Heavy on 30 April 1946
Redesignated 19th Bombardment Squadron, Medium on 28 July 1948
Discontinued and inactivated on 15 March 1963.
Consolidated with the 19th Special Operations Squadron as the 19th Tactical Intelligence Squadron on 19 September 1985

19th Special Operations Squadron

- Constituted as the 19th Air Commando Squadron, Troop Carrier and activated on 14 September 1964 (not organized)

Organized on 8 October 1964
Redesignated 19th Air Commando Squadron, Tactical Airlift on 1 August 1967
Redesignated 19th Special Operations Squadron on 1 August 1968
Redesignated 19th Tactical Airlift Squadron on 1 January 1970
Inactivated on 10 June 1971
Consolidated with the 19th Bombardment Squadron as the 19th Tactical Intelligence Squadron on 19 September 1985
Redesignated 19th Special Operations Squadron on 1 April 1996
Activated on 24 May 1996

=== Assignments ===
- 22d Bombardment Group, 1 February 1940 (attached to 22d Bombardment Wing after 10 February 1951)
- 22d Bombardment Wing, 16 June 1952 – 15 March 1963
- Pacific Air Forces, 14 September 1964 (not organized)
- 315th Troop Carrier Group (later 315th Air Commando Group), 8 October 1964
- 315th Air Commando Wing (later 315th Special Operations Wing, 315th Tactical Airlift Wing), 8 March 1966 – 10 June 1971
- 16th Operations Group (later 1st Special Operations Group), 24 May 1996
- Air Force Special Operations Training Center, 1 October 2008
- Unknown, 11 February 2015 (Note: Probably Air Force Special Operations Air Warfare Center)
- 492d Special Operations Wing, c. 10 May 2017 – present

=== Stations ===
- Patterson Field, Ohio, 1 February 1940
- Langley Field, Virginia, 16 November 1940
- Muroc Field, California, 9 December 1941 – 28 January 1942
- Archerfield Airport, Australia, 25 February 1942

Air echelon at Hickam Field, Hawaii, 15 February – 22 March 1942

- Ipswich Airfield, Australia, 2 March 1942
- RAAF Base Townsville, Australia, 29 March 1942
- Woodstock Airfield, Australia, 4 July 1942
- Iron Range Airfield, Australia, 15 September 1942
- Woodstock Airfield, Australia, 4 February 1943
- Dobodura Airfield, New Guinea, 11 July 1943
- Nadzab Airfield, New Guinea, c. 24 January 1944
- Owi Airfield, Schouten Islands, Netherlands East Indies, 22 July 1944
- Angaur Airstrip, Palau Islands, 2 December 1944
- Guiuan Airfield, Samar, Philippines, 15 January 1945
- Clark Field, Luzon, Philippines, 15 March 1945
- Motobu Airfield, Okinawa, 14 August 1945
- Fort William McKinley, Luzon, Philippines, 23 November 1945
- Kadena Air Base, Okinawa, 15 May 1946 – 13 May 1948
- Smoky Hill Air Force Base, Kansas, 18 May 1948

Deployed to RAF Lakenheath, England, 16 November 1948 – 12 February 1949

- March Air Force Base, California, 10 May 1949 – 15 March 1963

Deployed to: RAF Marham, England (26 November 1949 – 17 February 1950)

  - Deployed: Kadena Air Base, Okinawa (9 July – 30 October 1950)
  - Deployed: RAF Lakenheath, England (5 September – 3 December 1951)
  - Deployed: RAF Upper Heyford, England (12 December 1953 – 5 March 1954)
  - Deployed: Andersen Air Force Base, Guam (2 April – 2 July 1957)
- Tan Son Nhut Air Base, South Vietnam, 8 October 1964 – 10 June 1971
- Hurlburt Field, Florida, 24 May 1996 – present

=== Aircraft ===
- Douglas B-18 Bolo (1940–1941)
- North American B-25 Mitchell, 1943–1944
- Martin B-26 Marauder (1941–1944)
- Consolidated B-24 Liberator (1944–1945)
- Boeing B-29 Superfortress (1946–1953)
- Boeing B-47 Stratojet (1953–1963)
- Fairchild C-123B Provider (1964–1968)
- Fairchild C-123K Provider (1967–1971)
- Lockheed AC-130H (1996–2015)
  AC-130J: FY2017 (est)
- Lockheed AC-130U (1996–present)
- Lockheed MC-130E Combat Talon I (1996–present)

== See also ==
- United States Army Air Forces in Australia (World War II)
