= 33rd Flying Training Squadron =

33d Flying Training Squadron
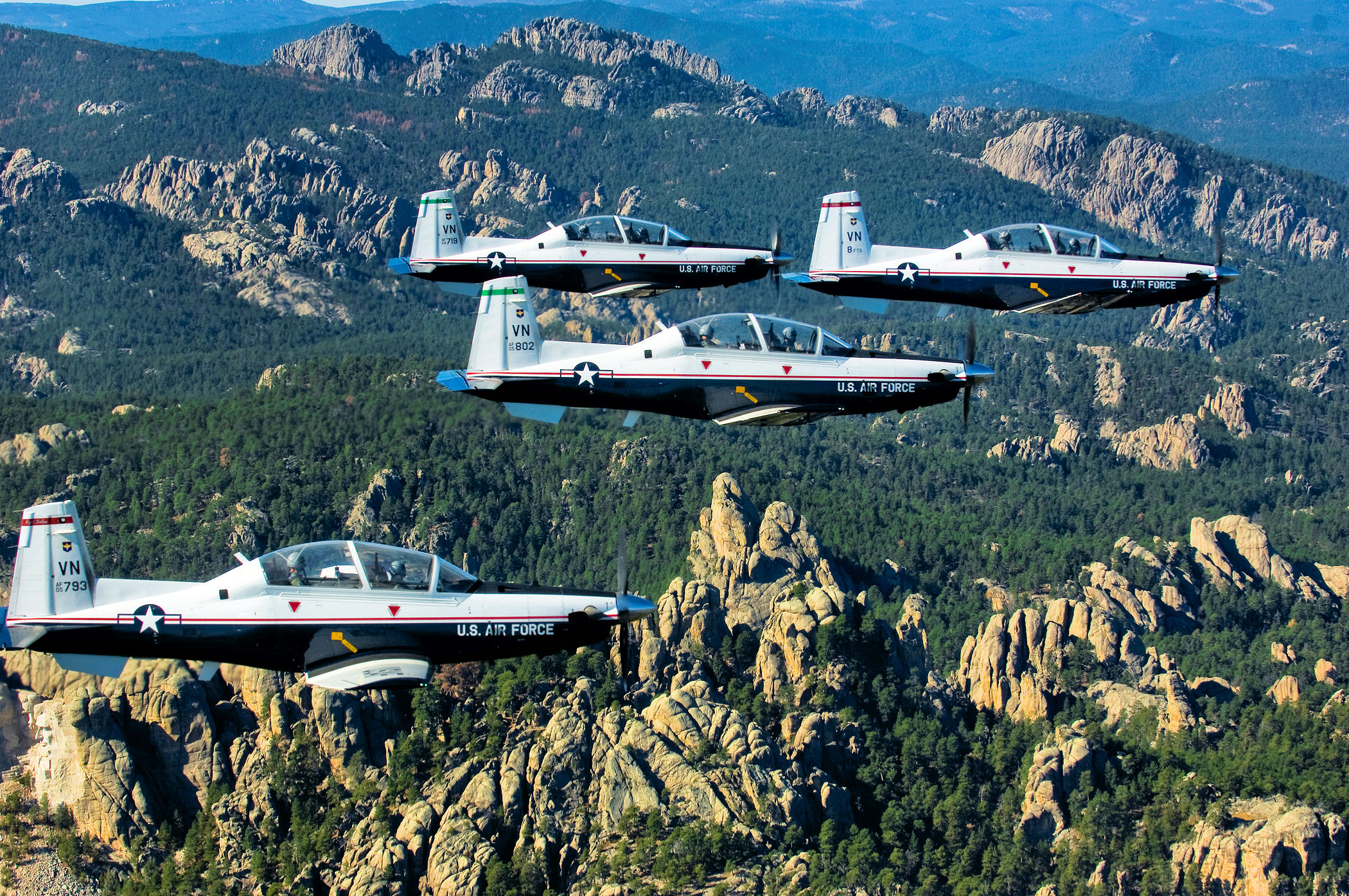
- Formation of T-6A Texan IIs from Vance AFB
- Active: 1940–1963; 1990–1992; 1998–present
- Country: United States
- Branch: United States Air Force
- Role: Pilot training
- Part of: Air Education and Training Command
- Garrison/HQ: Vance Air Force Base
- Engagements: Southwest Pacific Theater; Korean War
- Decorations: Distinguished Unit Citation; Air Force Outstanding Unit Award; Philippine Republic Presidential Unit Citation; Republic of Korea Presidential Unit Citation

Insignia
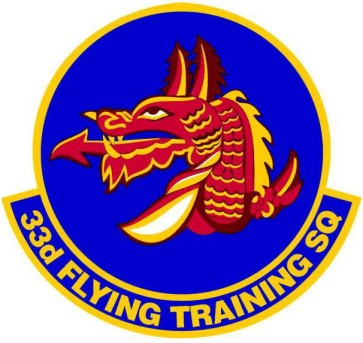
- 33d Flying Training Squadron emblem (Note: Approved 21 July 1988.)

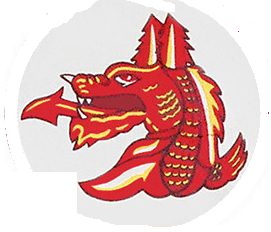
- 33d Bombardment Squadron emblem (Note: Approved 10 April 1941.)

The 33rd Flying Training Squadron is a United States Air Force squadron based at Vance Air Force Base near Enid, Oklahoma. It is a part of the 71st Flying Training Wing.

The squadron was established as a medium bomber unit on Bolos, Marauders, and later B-25 Mitchells. It became a heavy bomber squadron in February 1944, and was later equipped with B-29s and B-47s before being inactivated in 1963. Just under thirty years later, it was reactivated as a flying training squadron.

== History ==
=== World War II ===
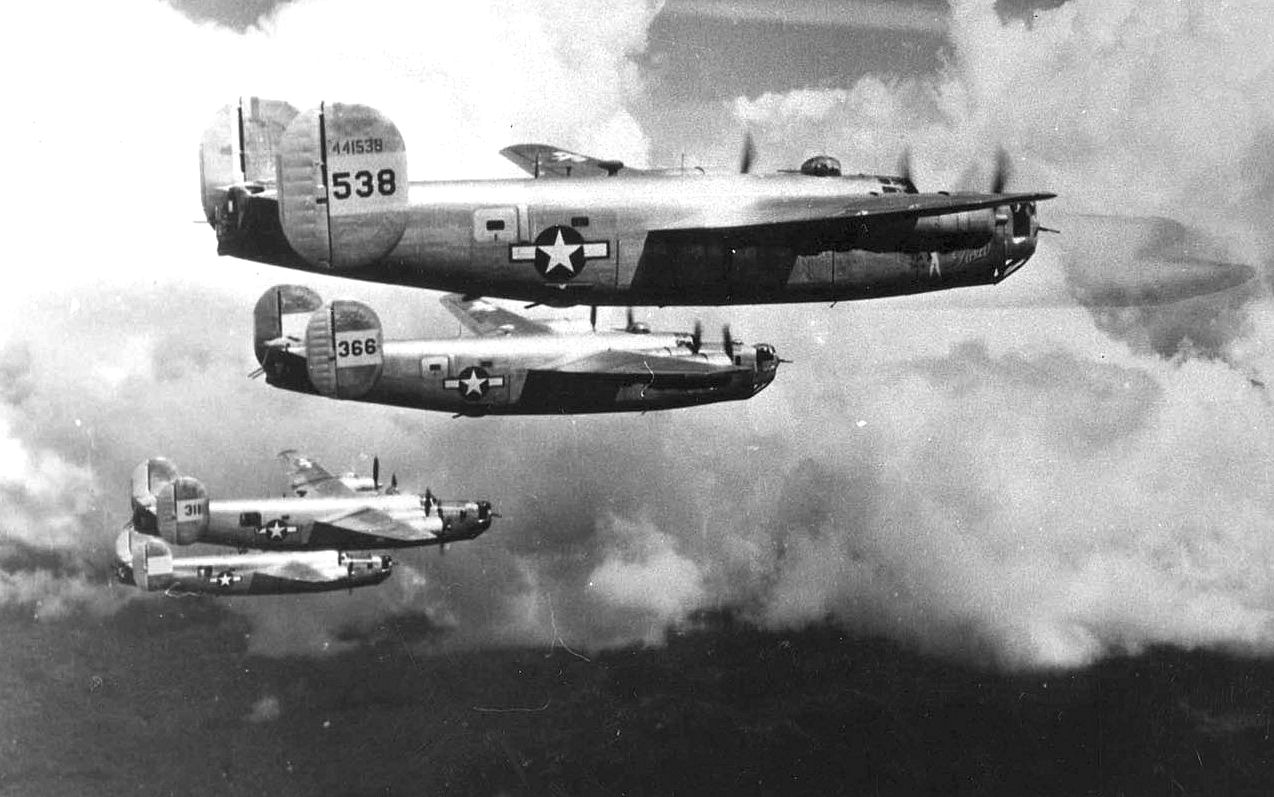
B-24s from the 33d Bombardment Squadron (Note: Nearest aircraft is Consolidated B-24L-5-CO Liberator serial 44-41538. This plane was named Round Trip Ticket. Consolidated B-24J Liberator serial 44-40366 was named Gypsy and later renamed Slightly Dangerous.)

Established as a GHQ Air Force medium bomber squadron in 1940 as a result of the buildup of the Army Air Corps after the breakout of World War II in Europe. It trained with a mix of Douglas B-18 Bolos and Martin B-26 Marauders.

After the Pearl Harbor Attack, the squadron was transferred to the West Coast, flying anti-submarine patrols from Muroc Army Air Field, California from December 1941 to the end of January 1942. It was then assigned to the new Fifth Air Force, originally based on the Philippines, leaving the B-18s at Muroc. By the time the squadron arrived in the theater the situation on the Philippines was desperate, and the squadron was based in Australia. From there it attacked Japanese targets on New Guinea and New Britain. In October 1943 the B-26 Marauders were joined by North American B-25 Mitchells, and for the rest of the year the group continued to operate in support of Allied troops on New Guinea.

In February 1944 the unit was redesignated as a heavy bomber squadron, and was assigned long range Consolidated B-24 Liberators, built by Ford and optimized for long range bombing missions in the Pacific. With its new heavy bombers the group attacked targets on Borneo, Ceram and Halmahera, among them the crucial oil fields of the Netherlands East Indies. In September 1944 the squadron moved its attention to the Philippines, attacking targets on Leyte. It moved onto Leyte on 15 November 1944. From then until August 1945 it flew against targets on Luzon, as well as supporting the campaign on Borneo and even ranging out as far as China. Finally, on 15 August 1945 the unit moved to Okinawa, from where it flew a number of armed reconnaissance missions over southern Japan to make sure the surrender terms were being obeyed. Most of the squadron's personnel were demobilized after the war; the squadron being reassigned to the Philippines where its B-24s were sent to reclamation and it became a paper unit.

The squadron was redesignated as a Boeing B-29 Superfortress squadron on Okinawa in 1946, receiving former Eighth Air Force B-29s originally deployed from the United States for the planned Air Offensive as part of the Japanese Campaign. Became part of Twentieth Air Force, and flew training missions in and around Okinawa until being made non-operational in 1948.

=== Cold War bombardment ===
Assigned to Strategic Air Command in 1948, receiving B-29s and operating from Smoky Hill Air Force Base, Kansas; later from March Air Force Base, California. Took part in SAC deployments and exercises. In 1950 was part of the Fifteenth Air Force SAC contingent of non-nuclear-capable B-29 units deployed to Okinawa due to the breakout of the Korean War. Flew combat missions over North Korea during 1950, returning to the United States in October.

Upon return to the United States, trained with second-line B-29s for training and organization. Replaced the propeller-driven B-29s with new Boeing B-47E Stratojet swept-wing medium bombers in 1953, capable of flying at high subsonic speeds and primarily designed for penetrating the airspace of the Soviet Union. In the late 1950s, the B-47 was considered to be reaching obsolescence, and was being phased out of SAC's strategic arsenal. Began sending aircraft to other B-47 wings as replacements in late 1962; Inactivated in early 1963 when the last aircraft was retired.

=== Pilot training ===
The squadron was reactivated under Air Training Command as a flying training unit in 1990. Inactivated in 1992; Reactivated in 1998 as part of Air Education and Training Command.

As Vance AFB is a Joint Specialized Undergraduate Pilot Training (JSUPT) location, United States Navy and United States Marine Corps aviators as well as Air Force and Air National Guard pilots train there.

The 33 FTS currently flies the Beechcraft T-6A Texan II which has 1100 shaft horsepower and a maximum speed of 316 knots indicated airspeed. The 33 FTS mascot is the dragon and students use callsigns starting with "DRAGN" when on station and "Hook" when off station.

== Lineage ==
- Constituted as the 33d Bombardment Squadron (Medium) on 22 December 1939

Activated on 1 February 1940
Redesignated: 33d Bombardment Squadron, Heavy on 3 February 1944
Redesignated: 33d Bombardment Squadron, Very Heavy on 30 April 1946
Redesignated: 33d Bombardment Squadron, Medium on 28 July 1948
Discontinued and inactivated on 15 March 1963
Redesignated 33d Flying Training Squadron on 9 February 1990
Activated on 11 May 1990
Inactivated on 1 October 1992
Activated on 1 October 1998

=== Assignments ===
- 22d Bombardment Group, 1 February 1940 (attached to 22d Bombardment Wing after 10 February 1951)
- 22d Bombardment Wing, 16 June 1952 – 15 March 1963
- 64th Flying Training Wing, 11 May 1990
- 64th Operations Group, 15 December 1991 – 1 October 1992
- 71st Operations Group, 1 October 1998 – present

=== Stations ===
- Patterson Field, Ohio, 1 February 1940
- Langley Field, Virginia, 16 November 1940
- Muroc Army Air Field, California, 9 December 1941 – 28 January 1942
- Archerfield Airport, Australia, 25 February 1942
- Amberley Field, Australia, 1 March 1942
- Antil Plains Aerodrome, Australia, 7 April 1942
- Woodstock Airfield, Australia, 20 July 1942
- Iron Range Airfield, Australia, 29 September 1942
- Woodstock Airfield, Australia, 4 February 1943
- Dobodura Airfield, New Guinea, 15 October 1943
- Nadzab Airfield, New Guinea, c. 10 January 1944

Air echelon at Charters Towers Airfield, Australia, 11 January – 19 February 1944

- Owi Airfield, Schouten Islands, Netherlands East Indies, 14 August 1944
- Angaur, Palau Islands, 26 November 1944
- Guiuan Airfield, Samar, Philippines, 21 January 1945
- Clark Field, Luzon, Philippines, 12 March 1945
- Motobu Airfield, Okinawa, 15 August 1945
- Fort William McKinley, Luzon, Philippines, 23 November 1945
- Kadena Air Base, Okinawa, 15 June 1946 – c. 7 May 1948
- Smoky Hill Air Force Base, Kansas, 18 May 1948 (deployed to RAF Lakenheath, England, c. 16 November 1948 – c. 14 February 1949)
- March Air Force Base, California, 10 May 1949 – 15 March 1963 (deployed to RAF Lakenheath, England, 18 November 1949 – 16 February 1950; Kadena Air Base, Okinawa, 8 July – 29 October 1950; RAF Wyton, England, 5 September – 9 December 1951; RAF Upper Heyford, England, 9 December 1953 – 5 March 1954)
- Reese Air Force Base, Texas, 11 May 1990 – 1 October 1992
- Vance Air Force Base, Oklahoma 1 October 1998 – Present

=== Aircraft ===
- Douglas B-18 Bolo, 1940–1941
- Martin B-26 Marauder, 1941–1943
- North American B-25 Mitchell, 1943–1944
- Consolidated B-24 Liberator, 1944–1945
- Boeing B-29 Superfortress, 1946–1952
- Boeing B-47 Stratojet, 1953–1963
- Cessna T-37 Tweet, 1990–1992; 1998–2006
- Beechcraft T-6A Texan II, 2006–present

== See also ==
- United States Army Air Forces in Australia (World War II)
