= 22nd Operations Group =

22nd Operations Group

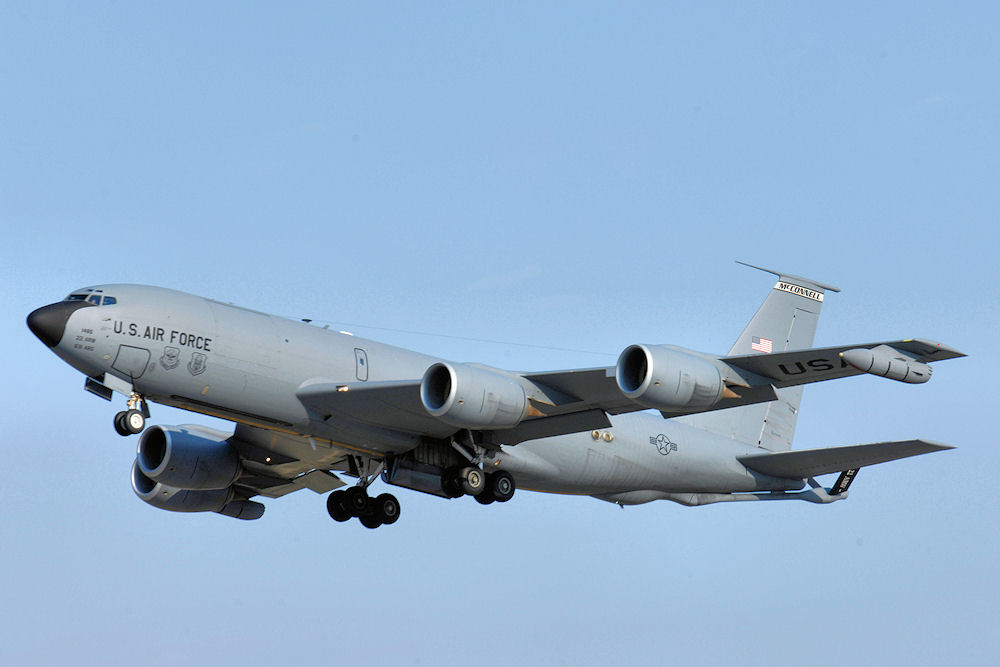
- KC-135R Stratotanker taking off (Note: Aircraft is Boeing KC-135R-BN Stratotanker, serial 57-1486.)
- Active: 1940–1952; 1991–present
- Country: United States
- Branch: United States Air Force
- Part of: Air Mobility Command
- Garrison/HQ: McConnell AFB
- Nickname: Red Raiders (World War II)
- Motto: Ducemus Latin We Lead
- Engagements: Southwest Pacific Theater; Korean War
- Decorations: Distinguished Unit Citation; Air Force Meritorious Unit Award; Air Force Outstanding Unit Award; Philippine Presidential Unit Citation; Republic of Korea Presidential Unit Citation

Commanders
- Current commander: Col Sean McCurdy

Insignia
- 22nd Operations Group emblem (Note: The group uses the 22nd Air Refueling Wing emblem with the group designation on the scroll. Robertson, Factsheet 22 Operations Group.)

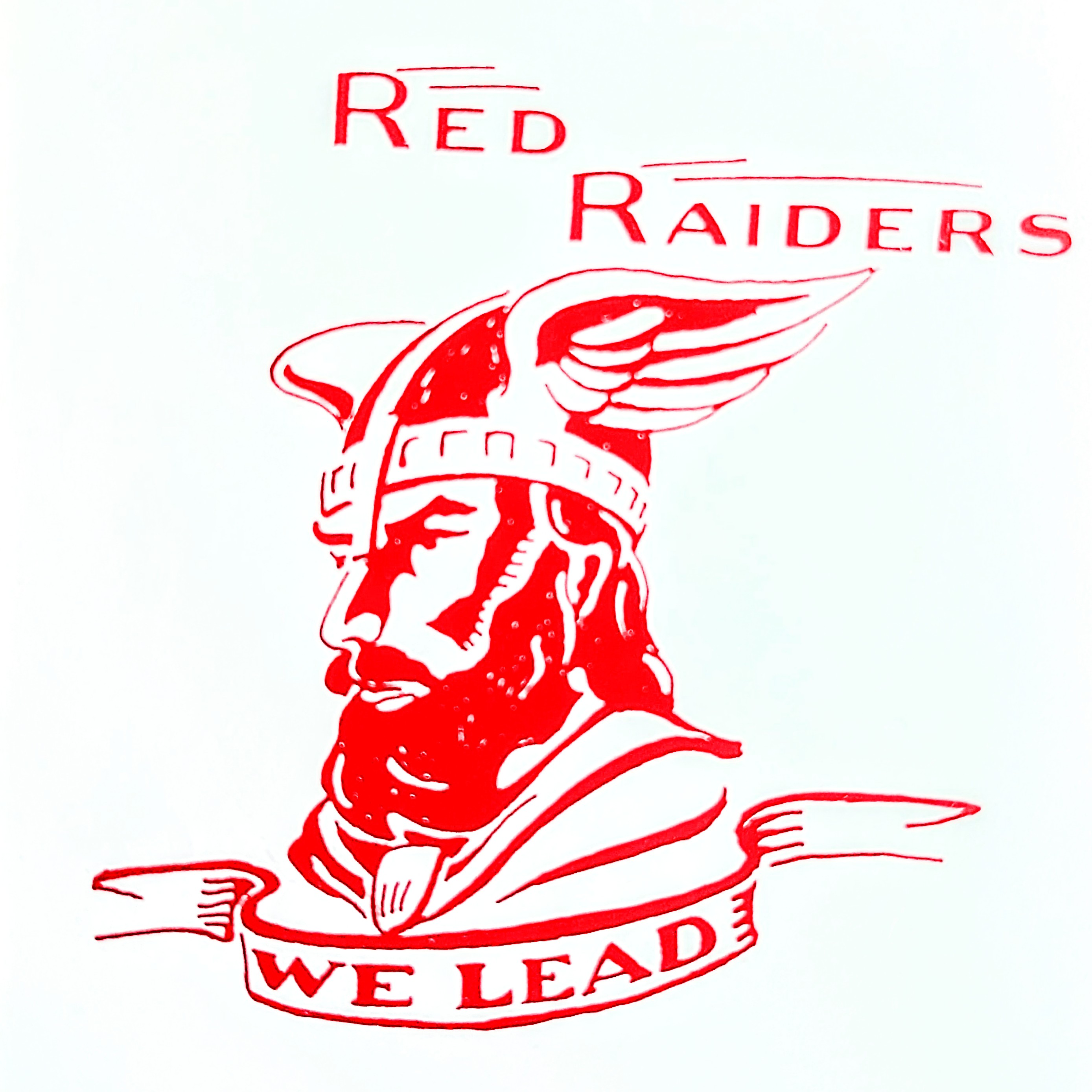
- Red Raider marking used by the 22nd Bombardment Group

The 22nd Operations Group is the operational flying component of the United States Air Force 22nd Air Refueling Wing. It is stationed at McConnell Air Force Base, Kansas, and is part of Air Mobility Command (AMC)'s Eighteenth Air Force.

The group's primary mission is to provide global reach by conducting air refueling and airlift where and when needed. The group directs the 22nd Wing's Boeing KC-135R Stratotanker refueling and airlift operations in support of worldwide AMC, United States Transportation Command, Air Force, Department of Defense, and allied operations anywhere in the world.

During World War II, as the 22nd Bombardment Group, the unit was one of the first Army Air Forces units to be deployed into the Pacific Theater after Pearl Harbor with the Martin B-26 Marauder medium bomber. It operated primarily in the Southwest Pacific Theater as a North American B-25 Mitchell unit assigned to Fifth Air Force. It was awarded two Distinguished Unit Citations and the Philippine Presidential Unit Citation for its combat service in China, the Netherlands East Indies, New Guinea, the Bismarck Archipelago; the Western Pacific; Leyte and Luzon.

The group was reactivated as part of Strategic Air Command (SAC). During the early years of the Cold War, the group moved temporarily to Okinawa in July 1950 and was attached to Far East Air Forces for duty in the Korean War. It began combat immediately, and until October 1950 attacked marshalling yards, bridges, highways, airfields, and industries and supported United Nations ground forces in Korea. It was inactivated in a SAC program to eliminate groups and assign operational squadrons directly to wings.

== Units and mission ==
The 22nd Operations Group uses five squadrons and their assigned personnel to execute the wing's air refueling and airlift missions, from the continental United States refueling support to unit deployments in support of theater operations worldwide.

- 344th Air Refueling Squadron
- 349th Air Refueling Squadron
- 350th Air Refueling Squadron

With these air refueling squadrons, the group supervises operations in support of strategic force projection and mobility, special operations, tactical air operations, and humanitarian assistance efforts.

- 22nd Operations Support Squadron

The squadron provides airfield management, air traffic control, intelligence, combat crew communications, base weather service, mission scheduling, planning, and combat tactics.

== History ==
=== Origins ===
The authorizing document was a letter issued by the Adjutant-General's Office titled "The Constitution and Activation of Certain Air Corps Units". Lieutenant Colonel Ross F. Cole was the first Group Commander.

The first elements of the Group included:

- 2nd Bombardment Squadron, commanded by Captain Leslie P. Halcomb
- 19th Bombardment Squadron, commanded by 1st Lieutenant Herman E. Hurst
- 33rd Bombardment Squadron, commanded by 1st Lieutenant Theodore E. Graff
- 18th Reconnaissance Squadron (later 408th Bombardment Squadron), commanded by Captain John P. Doyle.

The Group was located at Langley Field, Virginia. Its first aircraft were a few Douglas B-18 Bolo bombers, with a few North American B-25 Mitchell bombers allocated to the 18th Reconnaissance Squadron.

In 1941 the Group transitioned to Martin B-26 Marauder bombers, a fast bomber with very specialized aerodynamic capabilities. These capabilities included short, stubby wings, which led the plane to be known as "The Flying Prostitute" (no visible means of support). However its flying characteristics led to many crashes, which also led to the plane being known as "The Flying Coffin".

Throughout 1941 the 22nd trained extensively, increasing in intensity in November 1941. It was so combat ready that 16 hours after the Japanese attack on Pearl Harbor on 7 December 1941, the 44 planes of the 22nd headed for the West Coast and on to the South West Pacific.

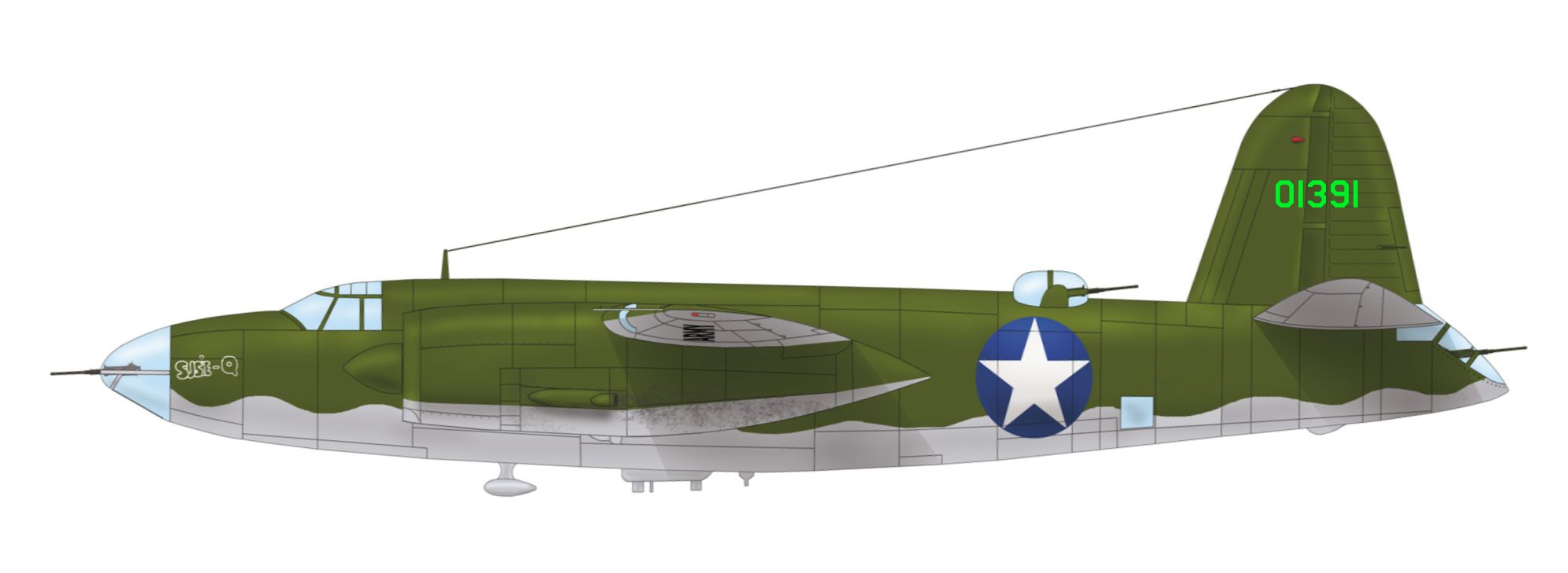
Martin B-26 Marauder torpedo bomber Susie-Q of the 408th Bombardment Squadron. It was flown by 1st Lt. James Muri during the Battle of Midway on 4 June 1942.

=== World War II ===
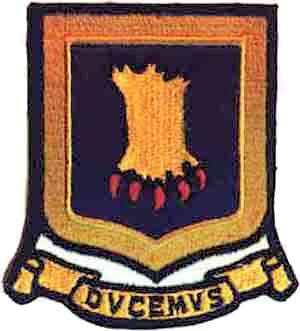
Patch with 22nd Bomb Group emblem with yellow border added.

The Group prepared itself at Muroc Army Air Field in the Mojave Desert in California from 15 December 1941 and began patrols of the west coast. A ground crew team left San Francisco on 31 January 1942 for Brisbane, Queensland in Australia.

On 6 February 1942, the Group's aircraft were shipped to Hickam Field (arriving about a week later). They immediately commenced patrol duties.

On 22 March 1942, the first flight of the 22nd air echelon arrived at Amberley Field. near Brisbane in Australia, and became the first fully armed Air Force Group to fly the Pacific en masse. They were warmly welcomed by the Australians who were concerned that, while the Japanese were threatening Australia, its troops were fighting the Germans in the Middle East.

Shortly after arriving in Australia, the Group (now under the command of Lieutenant Colonel Millard L. Haskin) moved further North to the Townsville area:

- 2nd Bombardment Squadron (commanded by 1st Lt George R. Anderson) was based at Reid River, about 40 miles South of Townsville
- 19th Bombardment Squadron (commanded by 1st Lt Elliott H. Reed) was based at Garbutt field.
- 33rd Bombardment Squadron (commanded by 1st Lt William A. Garnett) was based Antill Plains, 20 miles South of Townsville.
- 408th Bombardment Squadron (commanded by Captain Brian O'Neill) was also based at Reid River

On 5 April 1942, the 22nd took off from Garbutt Field for its first combat action, an attack on Rabaul in New Britain (North of New Guinea). In this attack on the Japanese Naval Base, the Group sunk a transport ship but lost a plane and the life of S/Sgt Bourne.

Meanwhile, four B-26 Marauders, including two from the 18th Reconnaissance Squadron, left behind at Hawaii, saw action on 4 June 1942 as part of the air attack in the Battle of Midway, and were the first Army planes to make a torpedo attack. These planes, piloted by 1st Lieutenant Herbert C. Mayes and 1st Lieutenant James P. Muri attacked the Japanese Naval Invasion Force, focusing torpedo and strafing action on its aircraft carrier. Lt Muri's plane, badly damaged with over 500 bullet and shrapnel holes, crash landed. [Lt Muri's account: https://www.youtube.com/watch?v=CSm055a0394] [Alternate URL for broken link (same original commentary): https://www.youtube.com/watch?v=6E67kmx3aWg&t=7m18s]

In 1944, the group converted from medium, twin engined B-25 Mitchell and B-26 Marauder bombers to heavy four engine Consolidated B-24 Liberator bombers. Following its conversion to Liberators, on 11 February 1944 the 22nd was redesignated 22nd Bombardment Group, Heavy. The group was tasked to bomb Japanese airfields, shipping, and oil installations in Borneo, Ceram, and Halmahera. It began raiding the southern Philippines in September 1944 to neutralize Japanese bases in preparation for the invasion of Leyte.

From December 1944 to August 1945, the group struck airfields and installations on Luzon, supported Australian ground forces on Borneo, and bombed railways and industries in Formosa and China. Near the end of the war the 22nd moved to Okinawa in August 1945 and flew some armed reconnaissance missions over southern Japan.

=== Postwar era ===
The 22nd's staff and aircraft were released and the group moved to Clark Air Base in the Philippines in November 1945. In April 1946 the 22nd returned to Okinawa as the 22nd Bombardment Group, Very Heavy and was remanned and assigned Boeing B-29 Superfortress bombers, operating from Kadena Air Base. In May 1948, moved to the United States to serve Strategic Air Command (SAC).

=== Korean War ===
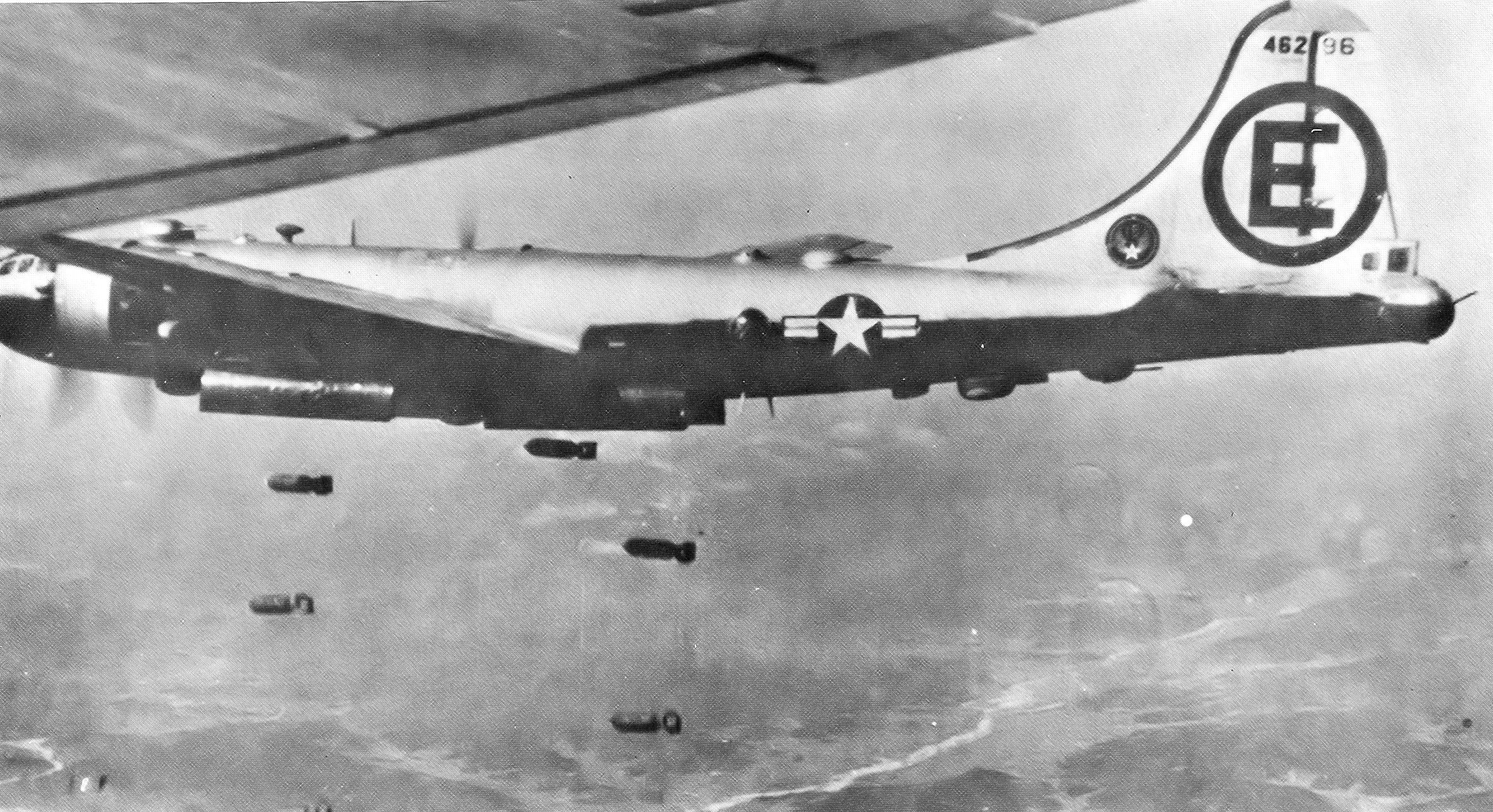
22nd Bombardment Group Boeing B-29A-65-BN Superfortress 44-62196 "Never Happen", on a mission over North Korea, July 1950.

The 22nd was one of two SAC groups selected to deploy to the Pacific after SAC was directed to reinforce the 19th Bombardment Wing of Far East Air Forces. The 22nd was selected because removing it from SAC control would have a minimum impact on the SAC mission because its planes were not yet equipped for the delivery of nuclear weapons and would not impact SAC's task of building a credible deterrent to the Soviet Union. The 22nd Bombardment Group deployed its B-29 Superfortresses in early July 1950 to Kadena Air Base, Okinawa, where it came under control of FEAF Bomber Command (Provisional). On 13 July, the group flew its first mission, against the marshalling yards and oil refinery at Wonsan, North Korea. By 21 October, it had amassed fifty-seven missions against the enemy, attacking bridges, factories, industrial targets, troop concentrations, airfields, marshalling yards, communications centers, and port facilities. During four months of combat, the group flew 335 sorties with only fourteen aborts and dropped over 6,500 tons of bombs.

When the 22nd returned to March Air Force Base in late October or early November 1950, 335 sorties had been flown. One plane, 44-62279, was reported lost during operations from Okinawa. Combat components of the group were the 2nd, 19th and 33rd Bombardment Squadrons. It became a records unit in February 1951, inactivated on 16 June 1952.

=== Modern era ===
After activation in 1991, commenced air refueling missions. Using KC-10 aircraft, the group airlifted humanitarian equipment and supplies to Somalia, 1992–1994. Deployed group aircrews and aircraft on other contingency operations in many parts of the world, including Haiti in 1994 and Serbia in 1999. The group also refueled aircraft enforcing no-fly zones over Bosnia-Herzegovina in the mid-1990s and over northern and southern Iraq between 1992 and 2002.

After terrorist attacks in the United States in September 2001, deployed crews and aircraft for operations in Afghanistan.

== Lineage ==
- Established as the 22bd Bombardment Group (Medium) on 22 December 1939

Activated on 1 February 1940
Redesignated 22nd Bombardment Group, Heavy on 11 February 1944
Redesignated 22nd Bombardment Group, Very Heavy on 15 June 1946
Redesignated 22nd Bombardment Group, Medium on 28 July 1948
Inactivated on 16 June 1952

- Redesignated 22nd Air Refueling Group, Heavy on 31 July 1985 (Remained inactive)
- Redesignated 22nd Operations Group on 29 August 1991

Activated on 1 September 1991

=== Assignments ===
- 2nd Wing (later 2nd Bombardment Wing), 1 February 1940
- I Bomber Command, 4 September 1941
- United States Army Forces in Australia, February 1942
- Allied Air Forces, Southwest Pacific Area, April 1942
- V Bomber Command, 5 September 1942 (attached to 309th Bombardment Wing, 1–16 February 1944
- Far East Air Forces (later, Pacific Air Command United States Army), November 1945
- Eighth Air Force, 15 May 1946
- 316th Bombardment Wing, c. 15 June 1946
- Fifteenth Air Force, June 1948
- 22nd Bombardment Wing, 1 August 1948 – 16 June 1952 (detached 1 August 1948 – 30 June 1949, 14 November 1949 – 20 February 1950, 4 July-c. 31 October 1950; not operational after 10 February 1951)
- 22nd Air Refueling Wing, 1 September 1991 – present

=== Components ===
22nd Bombardment Group

- 2nd Bombardment Squadron: 1 February 1940 – 16 June 1952 (attached to 22nd Bombardment Wing after 10 February 1951)
- 18th Reconnaissance Squadron (later 408th Bombardment Squadron): attached 1 February 1940 – 24 April 1942; assigned 24 April 1942 – 29 April 1946
- 19th Bombardment Squadron: 1 February 1940 – 16 June 1952 (attached to 22nd Bombardment Wing after 10 February 1951)
- 22nd Air Refueling Squadron: 16 June 1950 – 16 June 1952 (attached to 22nd Bombardment Wing after 10 February 1951)
- 33rd Bombardment Squadron: 1 February 1940 – 16 June 1952 (attached to 22nd Bombardment Wing after 10 February 1951)

22nd Operations Group

- 6th Air Refueling Squadron: 1 September 1991 – 1 January 1994
- 9th Air Refueling Squadron: 1 September 1991 – 1 January 1994
- 22nd Operations Support Squadron: 1 September 1991 – present
- 344th Air Refueling Squadron: 29 April 1994–present
- 349th Air Refueling Squadron: 1 January 1994–present
- 350th Air Refueling Squadron: 1 July 1994–present
- 384th Air Refueling Squadron: 1 January 1994–present
- 459th Airlift Squadron, 1 April – 1 October 1993

=== Stations ===
- Mitchel Field, New York, 1 February 1940
- Langley Field, Virginia, 14 November 1940
- Muroc Army Air Field, California, c. 9 December 1941 – 31 January 1942
- Amberley Field, Queensland, Australia, 1 March 1942
- Townsville, Queensland, Australia, 5 April 1942
- Donnington Airfield, Australia, 5 July 1942
- Iron Range Airfield, Australia, 2 October 1942
- Donnington Airfield, Australia, 4 February – 3 October 1943
- Dobodura Airfield Complex, New Guinea, 9 October 1943
- Nadzab Airfield Complex, New Guinea, c. 13 January 1944
- Owi Airfield, Schouten Islands, 11 August 1944
- Clark Field, Luzon, Philippines, 15 November 1944
- Angaur Airstrip, Palau Islands, 26 November 1944
- Guiuan Airfield, Philippines, 20 January 1945
- Clark Field, Luzon, Philippines, 12 March – 4 August 1945
- Motobu Airfield, Okinawa, 15 August 1945
- Fort William McKinley, Luzon, Philippines, 23 November 1945
- Kadena Air Base, Okinawa, 15 May 1946 – 29 June 1948
- Smoky Hill Air Force Base, Kansas, c. 29 June 1948 (deployed to RAF Marham and RAF Lakenheath, England, 15 November 1948 – February 1949)
- March Air Force Base, California, 1 May 1949 – 16 June 1952 (deployed to RAF Marham and RAF Lakenheath, England, December 1949 – March 1950; Kadena Air Base, Okinawa, July–October 1950
- March Air Force Base, California, 1 September 1991
- McConnell Air Force Base, Kansas, 1 January 1994 – present

=== Aircraft ===
- Douglas B-18 Bolo, 1941–1942
- North American B-25 Mitchell, 1940–1942, 1943–1944
- Martin B-26 Marauder, 1941–1944
- Consolidated B-24 Liberator, 1944–1945
- Douglas A-20 Havoc, 1945
- Douglas A-26 Invader, 1945
- Boeing B-29 Superfortress, 1946–1951
- Boeing B-47 Stratojet, 1955-196?
- Boeing KC-97 Stratofreighter, 1955-196?
- McDonnell Douglas KC-10 Extender, 1991–1994
- Beechcraft C-12 Huron, 1993–1995
- Gates C-21 Learjet, 1993
- Boeing KC-135 Stratotanker, 1994–present

== See also ==
- List of units using the B-26 Marauder during World War II
