= 2nd Bombardment Squadron =

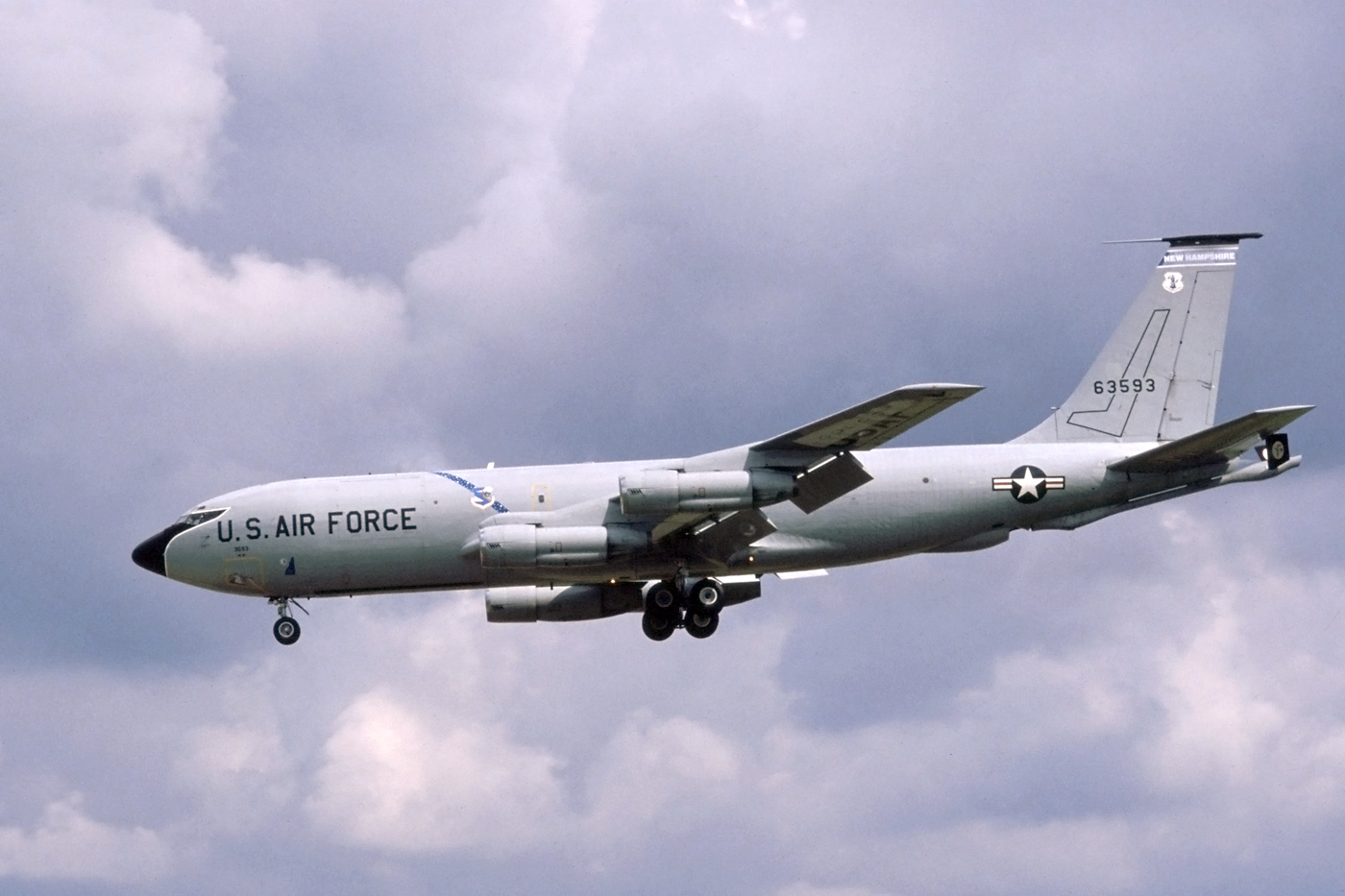
- Air National Guard KC-135E deployed to RAF Mildenhall in 1989
- Active: 1940–1963; 1963–1982; 1989–1992
- Country: United States
- Branch: United States Air Force
- Role: Control of deployed strategic units
- Mottos: Above and Beyond (1989–1992)
- Engagements: Southwest Pacific Theater; Korean War
- Decorations: Distinguished Unit Citation; Air Force Outstanding Unit Award; Philippine Presidential Unit Citation; Republic of Korea Presidential Unit Citation

Insignia
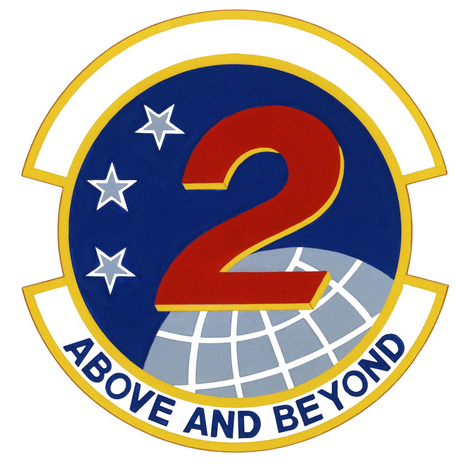
- 2d Strategic Squadron emblem (Note: Approved 1989.)

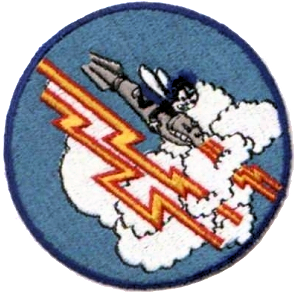
- 2d Bombardment Squadron emblem (Note: Approved 15 April 1952.)

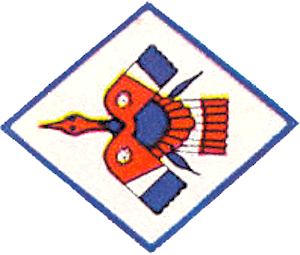
- 2d Bombardment Squadron emblem (World War II)

The 2nd Bombardment Squadron is an inactive United States Air Force unit. Its last assignment as a Boeing B-52 Stratofortress squadron was with the Strategic Air Command 22nd Bombardment Wing stationed at March Air Force Base, California. It was inactivated on 1 October 1982. The unit was redesignated as the 2nd Strategic Squadron as a Boeing KC-135 Stratotanker rotational squadron with the 306th Strategic Wing and was last active at RAF Mildenhall, England in 1992.

== History ==
=== World War II ===
Established as a medium bombardment squadron in 1940 under the Northeast Air District; equipped with Douglas B-18 Bolos and stationed at Langley Field, Virginia. Received early production Martin B-26 Marauder aircraft in late 1941. After the Pearl Harbor Attack, deployed to California] and flew antisubmarine patrols over the central and southern California coast.

Deployed to the new Fifth Air Force in Australia during February 1942, carrying out combat operations over Papua New Guinea in support of Allied ground forces engaging the invading Japanese beginning in April. Engaged in combat throughout the Southwest Pacific Area, being re-equipped with North American B-25 Mitchells in 1943, and long range Consolidated B-24 Liberator heavy bombers in 1944. Fought in the 1944–1945 Philippines Campaign, continuing raids on Japanese forces on Okinawa in 1945.

Squadron demobilized after the Japanese Capitulation, however carried as a Boeing B-29 Superfortress very heavy bomber unit and assigned to Twentieth Air Force in 1946 but not manned or equipped.

=== Strategic Air Command bombardment operations ===
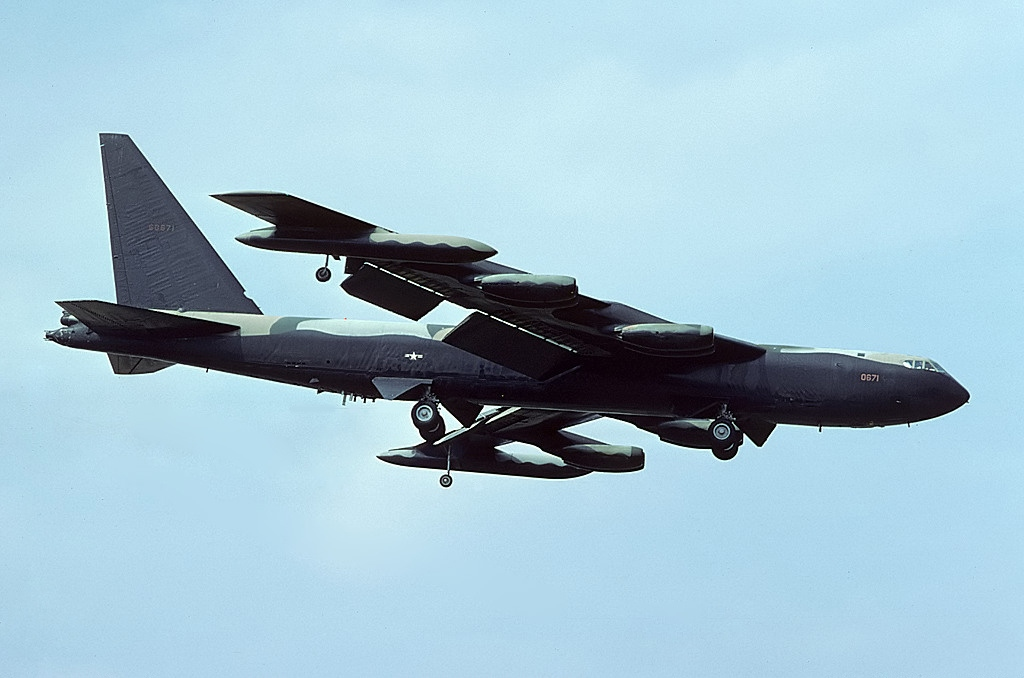
Boeing B-52D Stratofortress at March AFB

Returned to the United States and assigned to Strategic Air Command (SAC) at March Air Force Base in 1948, operating B-29s. Deployed to Okinawa and flew combat operations over North Korea after the breakout of the Korean War in 1950, remaining attached to Far East Air Force Bomber Command until returning to the United States in October. Operated B-29s under SAC until 1953, upgraded to Boeing B-47 Stratojet medium bombers. Engaged in worldwide training exercises throughout the 1950s and early 1960s until the B-47 was phased out of the inventory.

Equipped with Boeing B-52B Stratofortresses for training in 1963 and thru 1965 operational on Alert as nuclear deterrent at March AFB and Anderson AFB on Guam, also Chrome Dome flights; then operational B-52Ds in 1966. Deployed to Western Pacific bases during the Vietnam War and conducted combat operations over Indochina, engaging in Operation Arc Light, Linebacker I and Linebacker II raids over North Vietnam until 1973. Returned to the United States and stood nuclear alert until being inactivated in 1982.

=== Control of deployed Strategic Air Command aircraft ===
Reactivated with the 306th Strategic Wing in 1989 and operated the European Tanker Task Force rotational Boeing KC-135 Stratotanker aircraft operating from RAF Mildenhall.

== Lineage ==
- Constituted as the 2d Bombardment Squadron on 1 January 1938

Redesignated 2d Bombardment Squadron (Medium) on 6 December 1939
Activated on 1 February 1940
Redesignated 2d Bombardment Squadron, Heavy on 3 February 1944
Redesignated 2d Bombardment Squadron, Very Heavy on 30 April 1946
Redesignated 2d Bombardment Squadron, Medium on 28 July 1948
Discontinued and inactivated on 15 March 1963
Redesignated 2d Bombardment Squadron, Heavy on 20 March 1963 and activated (not organized)
Organized on 15 September 1963
Inactivated on 1 October 1982
Redesignated 2d Strategic Squadron on 19 December 1988
Activated on 1 January 1989
Inactivated on 31 March 1992

=== Assignments ===
- 22d Bombardment Group, 1 February 1940 (attached to 22d Bombardment Wing after 10 February 1951)
- 22d Bombardment Wing, 16 June 1952 – 15 March 1963
- 22d Bombardment Wing, 15 September 1963 – 1 October 1982
- 306th Strategic Wing, 1 January 1989 – 31 March 1992

=== Stations ===
- Bolling Field, DC, 1 February 1940
- Langley Field, Virginia, 14 November 1940
- Detrick Field, Maryland, March – September 1942
- Muroc Army Air Field, California, c. 9 December 1941 – 29 January 1942
- Archerfield Airport, Australia, 25 February 1942
- RAAF Base Amberley, Australia, 2 March 1942
- RAAF Base Townsville, Australia, 7 April 1942
- Reid River Airfield, Australia, 9 April 1942
- Dobodura Airfield, New Guinea, 9 October 1943
- Nadzab Airfield, New Guinea, 19 December 1943
- Owi Airfield, Schouten Islands, Netherlands East Indies, 11 August 1944
- Dulag, Leyte, Philippines, c. 19 November 1944
- Angaur Airstrip, Palau, c. 28 November 1944
- Guiuan Airfield, Samar, Philippines, 26 January 1945
- Clark Field, Luzon, Philippines, March 1945
- Motobu Airfield, Okinawa, 18 August 1945
- Fort William McKinley, Luzon, Philippines, 23 November 1945
- Motobu Airfield, Okinawa, 15 May 1946
- Smoky Hill Air Force Base, Kansas, 18 May 1948
- March Air Force Base, California, 10 May 1949 – 1 October 1982

Operated from Kadena Air Base, Okinawa, c. 9 July – c. 30 October 1950
Deployed to RAF Wyton, England, 5 September – 9 December 1951; RAF Upper Heyford, England, 9 December 1953 – 5 March 1954

- RAF Mildenhall, England, 1 January 1989 – 31 March 1992

=== Aircraft ===
- Douglas B-18 Bolo, 1940–1941
- Martin B-26 Marauder, 1941–1943
- North American B-25 Mitchell, 1943–1944
- Consolidated B-24 Liberator, 1944–1945
- Boeing B-29 Superfortress, 1946–1953
- Boeing B-47 Stratojet, 1953–1963
- Boeing B-52 Stratofortress
- B-52B, 1963–1966; B-52D, 1966–1982
- Boeing KC-135 Stratotanker, 1 January 1989 – 31 March 1992

== See also ==
- United States Army Air Forces in Australia
- List of B-52 Units of the United States Air Force
