= 22nd Air Refueling Wing =

Unit of US Air Force Air Mobility Command

22d Air Refueling Wing

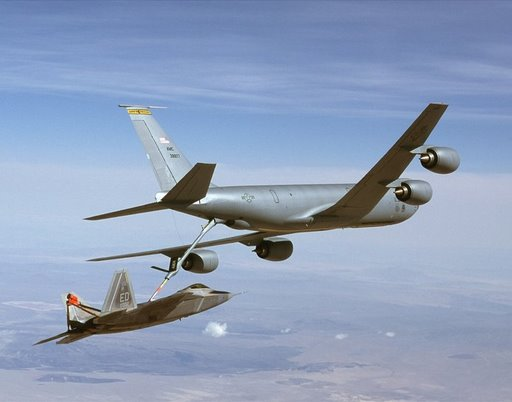
- A 22d Air Refueling Wing KC-135R Stratotanker refuels an F-22A Raptor from Edwards AFB, California.
- Active: 1 August 1948–present
- Country: United States
- Branch: United States Air Force
- Role: Aerial refueling
- Part of: Air Mobility Command
- Garrison/HQ: McConnell Air Force Base, Kansas
- Motto: Ducemus (Latin for 'We Lead')
- Equipment: Boeing KC-135 Stratotanker; Boeing KC-46 Pegasus
- Decorations: Air Force Outstanding Unit Award; Philippine Presidential Unit Citation

Commanders
- Notable commanders: General Howell M. Estes II; General Hansford T. Johnson; General Jerome F. O'Malley; Major General William Crumm

Insignia
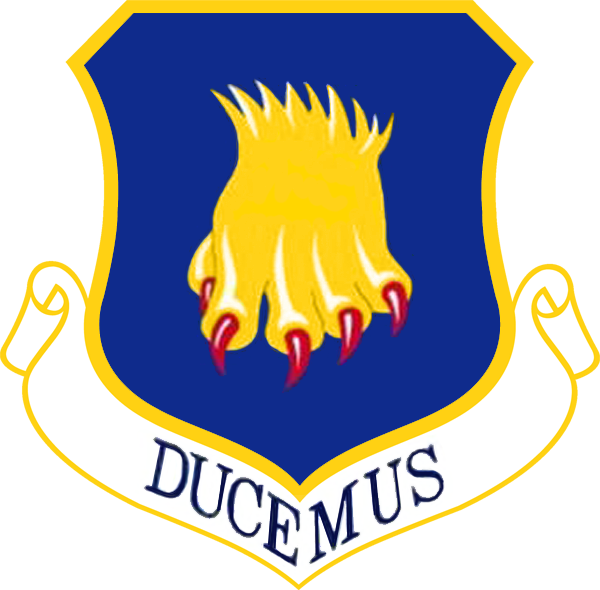
- 22d Air Refueling Wing emblem (Note: Approved 28 June 1951.)

The 22nd Air Refueling Wing is a United States Air Force unit assigned to the Air Mobility Command's Eighteenth Air Force. It is stationed at McConnell Air Force Base, Kansas, and it functions as the host wing for McConnell.

Its primary mission is to provide global reach by conducting air refueling and airlifts where and when they are needed. It is one of only three "super tanker" wings in the Air Force, with four regular Air Force air refueling squadrons, and 47 Boeing KC-135R Stratotanker and Boeing KC-46 Pegasus aircraft.

The 22nd's origins date to 1940 as the 22nd Bombardment Group. The group was one of the first United States Army Air Forces units to be deployed into the Pacific Theater after the Pearl Harbor Attack with the Martin B-26 Marauder medium bomber. The 22d Operations Group carries the lineage and history of its highly decorated World War II predecessor unit. Active for over 60 years, the 22nd Air Refueling Wing and its earlier designation as the 22nd Bombardment Wing, was a component wing of Strategic Air Command's deterrent force during the Cold War.

The 22nd Air Refueling Wing is currently commanded by Colonel Joseph D. Wall. Its Deputy Commander is Colonel Aaron J. Strode. The wing's Command Chief Master Sergeant is CMSgt Markiesha C. Crawford.

== History ==
Established as 22nd Bombardment Wing, Medium, on 28 July 1948. Activated on 1 August 1948. The new wing was assigned to March Air Force Base, California on 10 May 1949. The 22nd was not operational, meaning it shared a commander with the 1st Fighter Wing. The 22nd became operational on 1 July 1949. The 1st Fighter Wing remained attached to the 22nd, and both groups continued to share the same commander.

=== Korean War ===
Detached from the wing, the 22d Bombardment Group deployed its B-29s in early July 1950 to Kadena Air Base, Okinawa, where it came under control of Far East Air Forces Bomber Command (Provisional). On 13 July, the group flew its first mission, against the marshaling yards and oil refinery at Wonsan, North Korea. By 21 October, it had amassed fifty-seven missions against the enemy, attacking bridges, factories, industrial targets, troop concentrations, airfields, marshalling yards, communications centers, and port facilities. During four months of combat, the group flew 335 sorties with only fourteen aborts and dropped over 6,500 tons of bombs. It redeployed to the United States in late October and November 1950.

=== Cold War ===
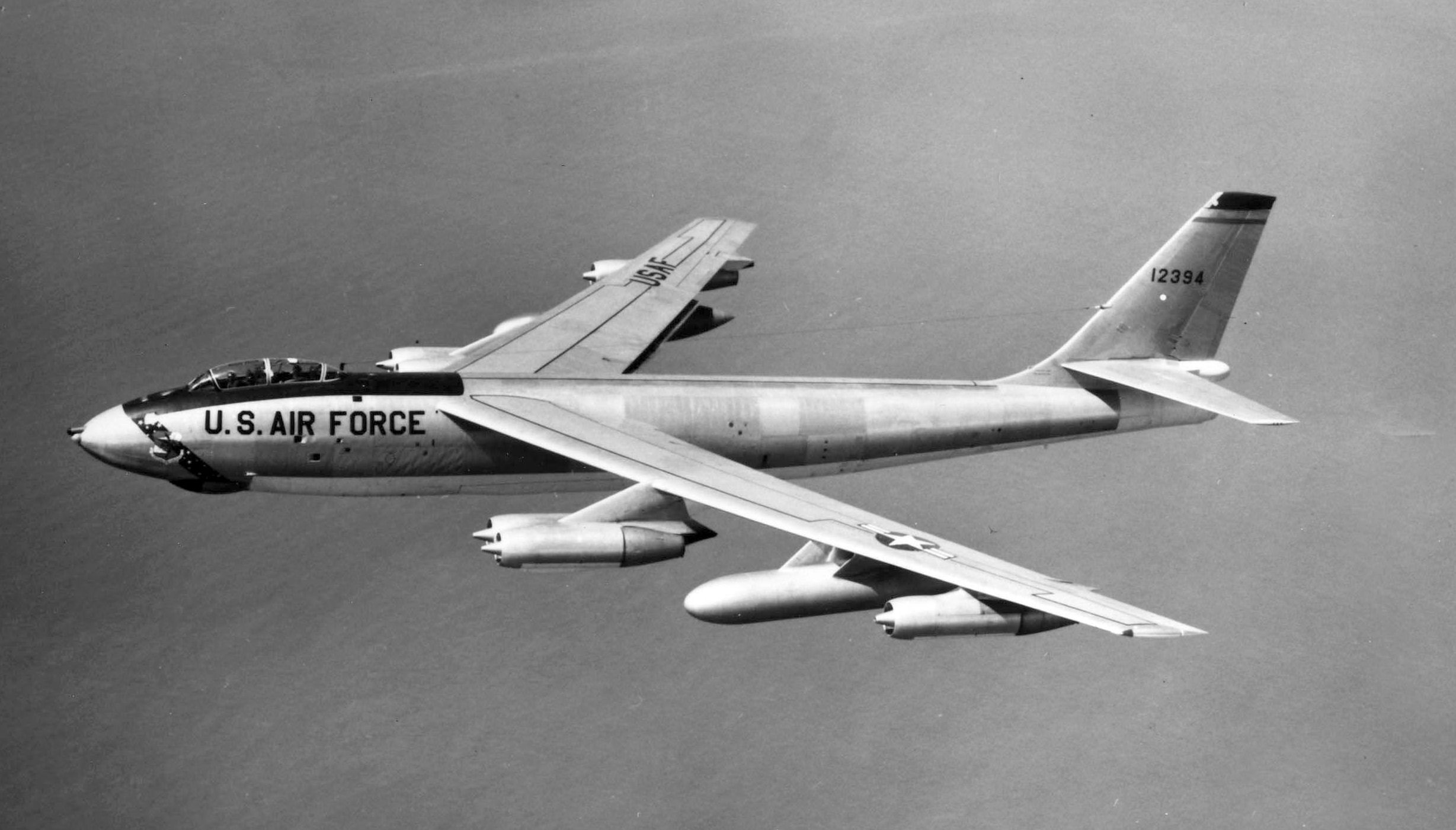
A B-47E Stratojet (51-2394) of the 22d BW, 1960.

Following the return of the bombardment group the wing re-equipped the propeller-driven B-29s with new Boeing B-47E Stratojet swept-wing bomber medium bombers in 1953, capable of flying at high subsonic speeds and primarily designed for penetrating the airspace of the Soviet Union. It trained for proficiency in global strategic bombardment, adding air refueling to its mission in 1952. The wing deployed at RAF Mildenhall, England, September–December 1951, and at RAF Upper Heyford, England, December 1953 – March 1954. From April to July 1957, it deployed to Andersen Air Force Base, Guam. SAC began phasing the B-47 out of the inventory beginning in 1962, sending the last of the wing's aircraft to Davis-Monthan Air Force Base, Arizona in 1963.

The wing was not tactically operational 11 March 1963 – 15 September 1963, while converting to B-52D bombers and KC-135A Stratotankers. The wing supported Fifteenth Air Force's post-attack command and control system with EC-135s from, September 1964 – March 1970.

The 22d was a "super" wing from 1966–1971, with two bombardment and two tanker squadrons. From 10 March – 1 October 1967 the wing was reduced to a small "rear-echelon" non-tactical organization with all tactical resources and most support resources loaned to SAC organizations involved in combat operations in Southeast Asia. In 1971, the Air Force retired all of its B-52C aircraft. The last airplane of this series was flown from March to Davis-Monthan Air Force Base, Arizona for storage on 29 September 1971. The wing continued to support SAC operations in the Far East and Southeast Asia through 1975, and from 10 April 1972 to 29 October 1973 again the wing had all its bomber resources loaned to other organizations for combat and contingency operations. The wing's KC-135 resources were also on loan from 10 April to September 1972; afterwards, a few tankers returned to wing control.

The wing maintained a strategic bombardment alert posture from, 1973–1982, but in 1978 it added conventional warfare missions, including mine-laying and sea reconnaissance/surveillance. For many years, the wing provided the operations staff and support of the Tanker Task Force (TTF) operations supporting Red Flag exercise flight operations on the Nellis Ranges, north of Las Vegas, NV, using KC-135 personnel and equipment assets deploying from other bases for the duration of a Red Flag Exercise. The TTF staff at March also supported overseas deployments of U.S. Navy, Marine Corps and USAF fighter aircraft going to the Pacific Region using both KC-135 and KC-10 tankers.

In 1982, the wing retired its B-52D aircraft and converted from a bombardment wing to an air refueling wing (ARW). It was the first USAF unit to operate the new McDonnell Douglas KC-10 Extender along with Boeing KC-135 Stratotanker ("A" and "E" variants) aircraft. From 1982, the wing provided strategic air refueling and air transport for Department of Defense operations and training exercises. In 1983, the wing moved personnel and cargo in support of Chadian resistance to Libyan incursions and conducted airlift and refueling missions during rescue of U.S. nationals in Grenada. The wing also provided specialized refueling support to SR-71 aircraft reconnaissance operations using Boeing KC-135Q and (after the CFM-56 conversion) KC-135T aircraft with specialized fuel systems designed to handle the JP-7 fuel, worldwide from 1985 to 1990.

In 1989, the 22 ARW transferred its KC-135E and KC-135Q aircraft and became solely a KC-10 unit.

=== After the Cold War ===
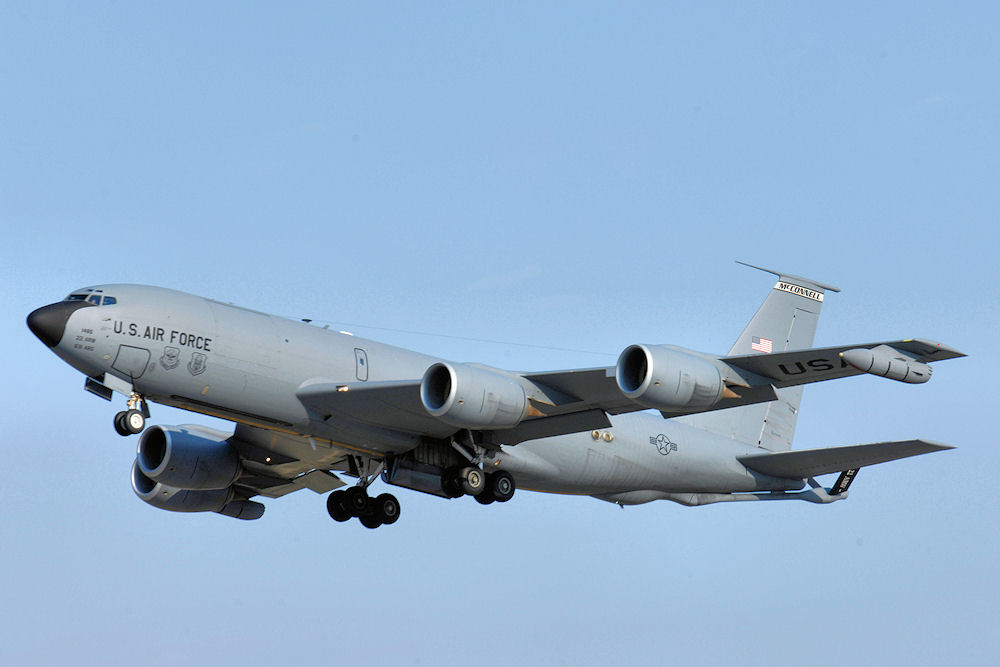
A 22d ARW KC-135R Stratotanker (57-1486) taking off from McConnell AFB on 16 April 2009.

The 22 ARW supported Lockheed F-117 Nighthawk deployments to Saudi Arabia and helped move personnel and equipment after the Invasion of Kuwait and the Gulf War in 1990–1991.

On 1 June 1992, Strategic Air Command was inactivated and the 22d ARW was assigned to the newly established Air Mobility Command (AMC). From the end of 1992 to 1994, the wing flew humanitarian airlift missions to Somalia and it also provided air refueling in support of deployments to Haiti in 1994.

On 1 January 1994, the wing was reassigned without personnel or equipment from March upon the transfer of March to the Air Force Reserve Command) to McConnell Air Force Base, Kansas, replacing the inactivating 384th Bomb Wing and assuming control of the 384th's KC-135R aircraft. The 22 ARW's former KC-10A aircraft assets were subsequently transferred to the 60th Airlift Wing at Travis Air Force Base, California, that unit being redesignated as the 60th Air Mobility Wing (60 AMW).

Various air refueling squadrons were reassigned to the reconstituted 22 ARW from other units as follows:

- 344 ARS from 68 ARW, Seymour Johnson Air Force Base, North Carolina
- 349 & 350 ARS from 100 ARW, Beale Air Force Base, California
- 384 ARS from inactivated 384 BW, McConnell Air Force Base, Kansas

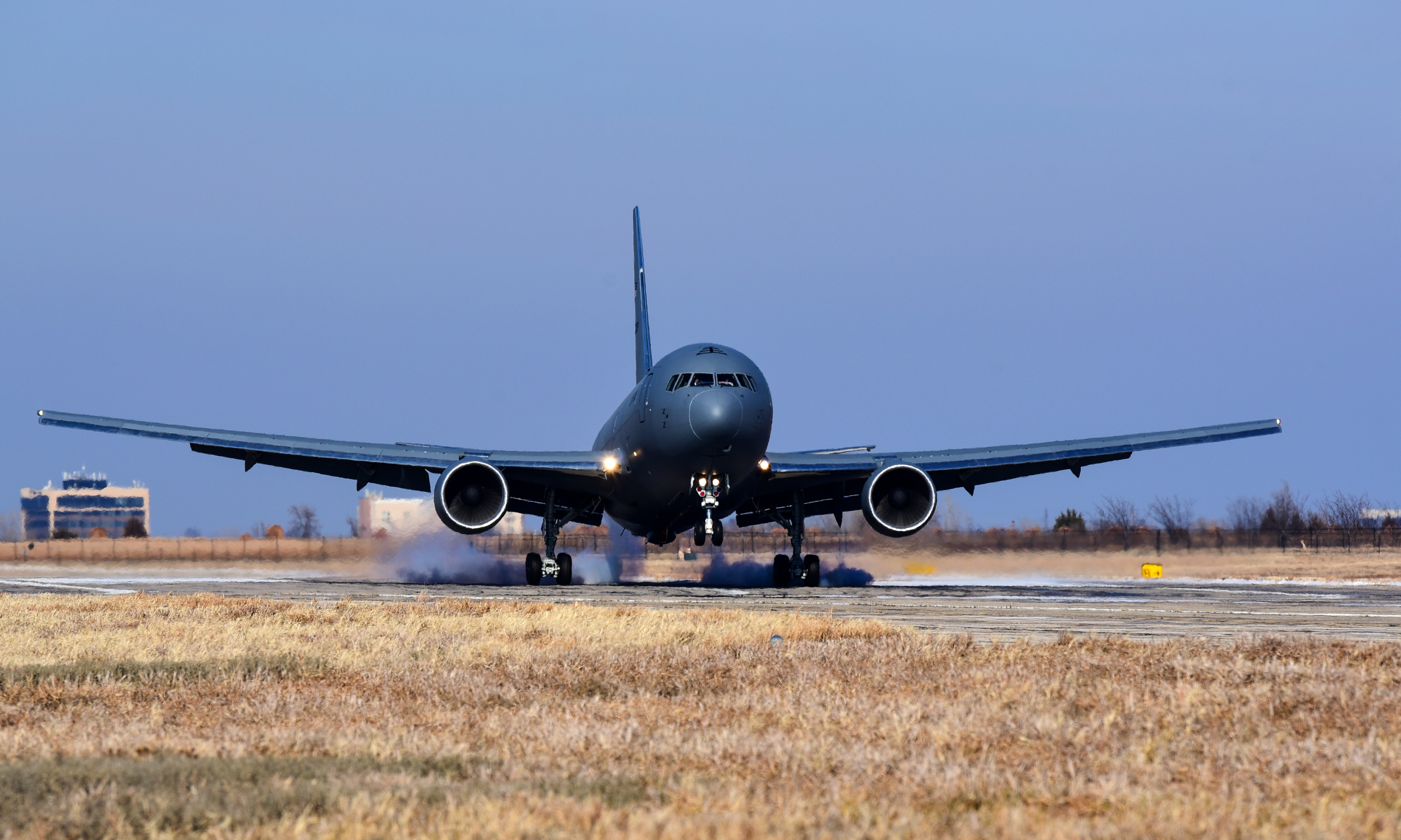
The 22d ARW's first C-46A Pegasus (15-46009) arriving at McConnell Air Force Base on 25 January 2019.

After the realignment, the 22 ARW deployed crews and aircraft to support no-fly missions over northern and southern Iraq and over Bosnia and Herzegovina. In 1999, wing aircraft and crews deployed to the Mediterranean to refuel NATO aircraft over Serbia. After the terrorist attacks on 11 September 2001, wing-supplied tanker crews and aircraft air-refueled combat aircraft on missions to the Afghanistan area.

The wing provided deployed KC-135R support during Operation Iraqi Freedom and continues to provide aerial refueling and air mobility support under Operation Noble Eagle in the United States, Operation Enduring Freedom and Operation New Dawn overseas, and other AMC, United States Transportation Command (USTRANSCOM), other combatant command, and associated national taskings as required.

On 25 January 2019, the wing received the first two of a planned 36 KC-46 Pegasus aircraft that will eventually replace the KC-135 as the primary Air Force tanker aircraft. A further two were delivered to McConnell on 31 January.

=== Subordinate organizations ===
22d Operations Group (22 OG)

- 344th Air Refueling Squadron (344 ARS) (Black tail stripe, now white)
- 349th Air Refueling Squadron (349 ARS) (Blue tail stripe, now white)
- 350th Air Refueling Squadron (350 ARS) (Yellow tail stripe, now white)
- 22d Operations Support Squadron (22 OSS)

22d Maintenance Group (22 MXG)

- 22d Maintenance Squadron (22 MXS)
- 22d Aircraft Maintenance Squadron (22 AMXS)
- 22d Maintenance Operations Squadron (22 MOS)
- 722d Aircraft Maintenance Squadron (722 AMXS)

22d Mission Support Group (22 MSG)

- 22d Security Forces Squadron (22 SFS)
- 22d Contracting Squadron (22 CONS)
- 22d Force Support Squadron (22 FSS)
- 22d Logistics Readiness Squadron (22 LRS)
- 22d Communications Squadron (22 CS)
- 22d Civil Engineering Squadron (22 CES)

22d Medical Group (22 MDG)

- 22d Medical Operations Squadron (22 MDOS)
- 22d Aeromedical Dental Squadron (22 AMDS)
- 22d Medical Support Squadron (22 MDSS)

Additionally, the 22d Comptroller Squadron (22 CPTS) reports directly to the wing.

== Lineage ==
- Constituted as the 22d Bombardment Wing, Medium on 28 July 1948

Activated on 1 August 1948
Redesignated 22d Bombardment Wing, Heavy on 15 March 1963
Redesignated 22d Air Refueling Wing, Heavy on 1 October 1982
Redesignated 22d Air Refueling Wing on 1 September 1991

=== Assignments ===
- Fifteenth Air Force, 1 August 1948

Attached to: 301st Bombardment Wing, 1 August 1948 – 9 May 1949
Attached to: 1st Fighter Wing, 10 May – 30 June 1949

- 12th Air Division, 10 February 1951

Attached to: 7th Air Division, 5 September – 4 December 1951; 7 December 1953 – 5 March 1954
Attached to: 3d Air Division, 1 April – 5 July 1957

- 47th Air (later, 47th Strategic Aerospace; 47th Air) Division, 1 January 1962
- 14th Strategic Aerospace Division, 31 March 1970
- 47th Air Division, 30 June 1971
- 12th Strategic Missile (later, 12th Air) Division, 1 August 1972
- 47th Air Division, 1 October 1985
- 14th Air Division, 23 January 1987
- Fifteenth Air Force, 1 July 1988
- Eighteenth Air Force, since 1 October 2003

=== Components ===
Wings

- 1st Fighter Wing: attached 1 July 1949 – 1 April 1950
- 330th Bombardment Wing: attached 27 June 1949 – 30 April 1951

Groups

- 22d Bombardment (later, 22d Operations) Group: 1 August 1948 – 16 June 1952 (detached 1 August 1948 – 30 June 1949; 14 November 1949 – 20 February 1950; 4 July – c. 31 October 1950); 1 September 1991 – .
- 458th Operations Group: 1 June 1992 – 1 July 1995

Squadrons

- 2d Bombardment Squadron: attached 10 February 1951 – 15 June 1952, assigned 16 June 1952 – 15 March 1963; 15 September 1963 – 1 October 1982 (Note: This unit was later redesignated as the 2nd Strategic Squadron and returned to active service under the 306th Strategic Wing at RAF Mildenhall, United Kingdom.)
- 6th Air Refueling Squadron: 3 January 1989 – 1 September 1991
- 9th Air Refueling Squadron: 1 August 1982 – 1 September 1991
- 408th Bombardment Squadron: 1 January 1959 – 1 January 1962
- 19th Bombardment Squadron: attached 10 February 1951 – 15 June 1952, assigned 16 June 1952 – 15 March 1963
- 22d Air Refueling Squadron: attached 10 February 1951 – 15 June 1952, assigned 16 June 1952 – 15 June 1960; 1 July 1963 – 1 December 1989
- 33d Bombardment Squadron: attached 10 February 1951 – 15 June 1952, assigned 16 June 1952 – 15 March 1963
- 320th Air Refueling Squadron: 16 June 1960 – 15 September 1962
- 352d Bombardment Squadron: attached 20 September – c. November 1951
- 486th Bombardment Squadron: 2 October 1966 – 1 July 1971
- 909th Air Refueling Squadron: 25 June 1966 – 1 July 1971

=== Stations ===
- Smoky Hill Air Force Base, Kansas, 1 August 1948
- March Air Force Base, California, 1 May 1949 – 31 December 1993
- McConnell Air Force Base, Kansas, 1 January 1994 – present

=== Aircraft operated ===
- F-86 Sabre (1949–1950)
- KC-97 Stratofreighter (1952–1962)
- Boeing B-47 Stratojet (1953–1963)
- Boeing B-52 Stratofortress (1963–1982)
- EC-135 Bird of Prey (1963–1970)
- Boeing KC-135 Stratotanker (1963–1989; 1994–present)
- McDonnell Douglas KC-10 Extender (1982–1994)
- C-21 (1992–1993)
- C-12 Huron (1993–1995)
- KC-46 Pegasus (2019–present)

References for commands and major units assigned, components and stations:

=== Operations ===
- Korean War
- Operation Urgent Fury
- Operation Northern Watch
- Operation Southern Watch
- Operation Deliberate Force
- Operation Allied Force
- Operation Enduring Freedom
- Operation Iraqi Freedom

== See also ==
- List of B-29 units of the United States Air Force
- List of B-47 units of the United States Air Force
- List of B-52 Units of the United States Air Force
