= 6th Air Refueling Squadron =

US Air Force unit

6th Air Refueling Squadron

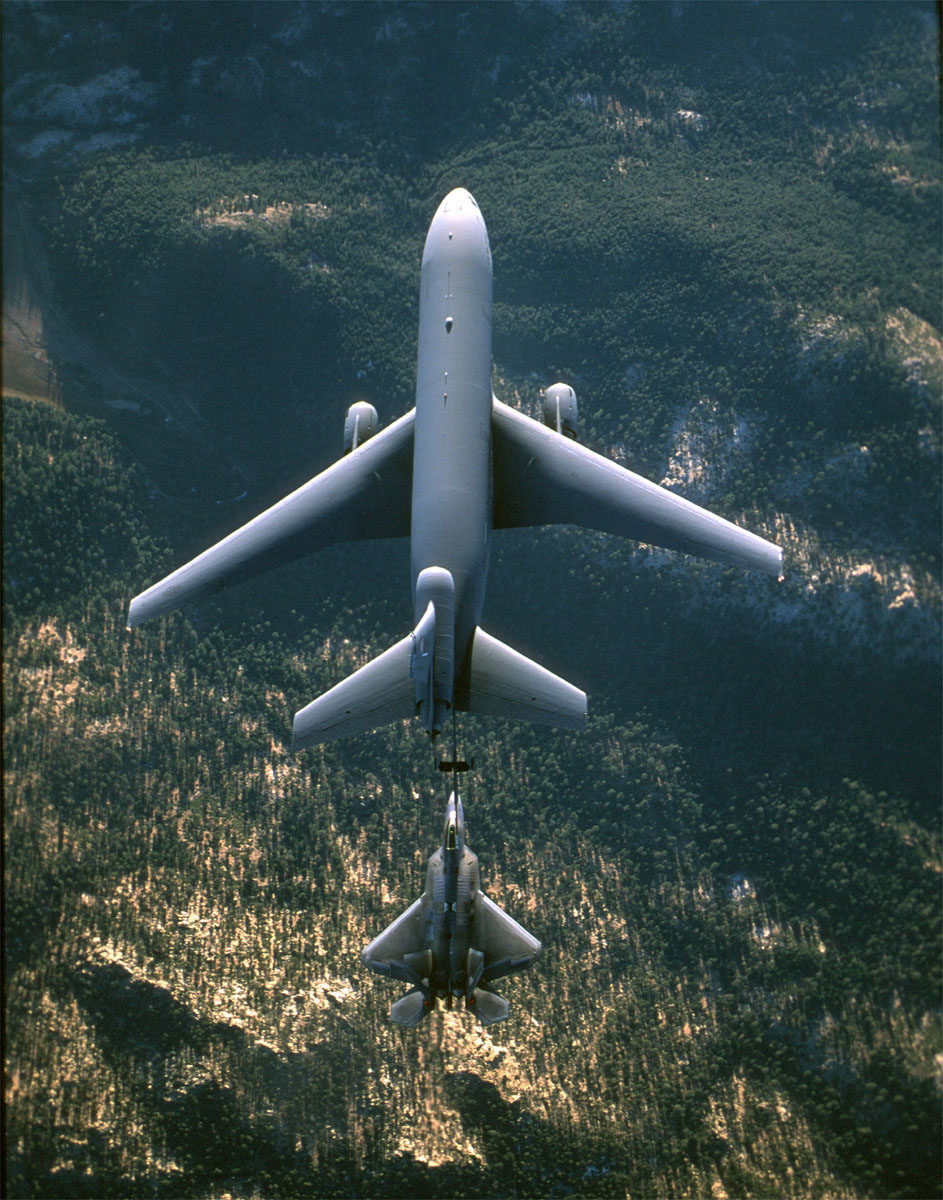
- A KC-10 Extender from Travis Air Force Base refuels an F-22 Raptor over Northern California
- Active: 1940-1946; 1947-1949; 1951-1951; 1957-1967; 1989–present
- Country: United States
- Branch: United States Air Force
- Role: Aerial refueling
- Part of: Air Mobility Command
- Garrison/HQ: Travis Air Force Base
- Nickname: XTNDRs
- Motto: Vis Extensa (Latin for 'Strength Extended') (1960-present)
- Colors: Blue and Yellow
- Mascot: Pegasus
- Engagements: World War II Antisubmarine; Pacific Theater of Operations
- Decorations: Distinguished Unit Citation; Air Force Meritorious Unit Award; Air Force Outstanding Unit Award

Commanders
- Current commander: Lt Col Dante Earle
- Notable commanders: Maj Gen Hugo P. Rush; Maj Gen Stanley T. Wray; Col Rowland H. Worrell Jr. Lt Gen Brooks L. Bash; Brig Gen Joel D. Jackson

Insignia
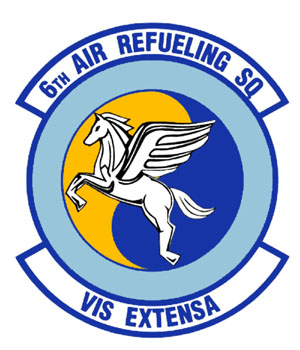
- 6th Air Refueling Squadron emblem (Note: Approved 9 December 1994.)

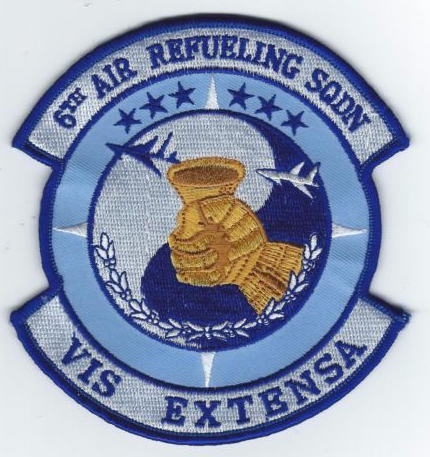
- Patch with 6th Air Refueling Squadron emblem (Note: approved 12 October 1960.)

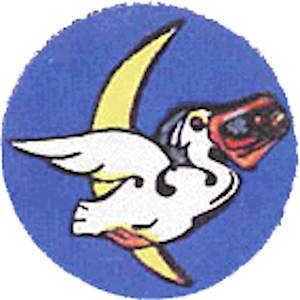
- 6th Bombardment Squadron emblem (Note: approved 6 April 1942. Description: On a blue disc flying across a yellow crescent moon a white pelican blll and feet proper holding in his beak a black bomb sparked at the fuse.)

Aircraft flown
- Tanker: KC-46 Pegasus

The 6th Air Refueling Squadron is part of the 60th Air Mobility Wing at Travis Air Force Base, California. It operates the Boeing KC-46 Pegasus aircraft, conducting mobility and air refueling missions.

The 6th Air Refueling Squadron was awarded the SMSGT Albert L. Evans Trophy for Outstanding Air Refueling Section of the Year in 2017. This distinction has been awarded to the 6th Air Refueling Squadron a record number of 6 times since 1989 -twice that of the 9th Air Refueling Squadron, the next most awarded unit.

== History ==
=== World War II ===
==== Antisubmarine Warfare and Heavy Bomber Training ====
The squadron was first activated at Langley Field, Virginia, as the 6th Bombardment Squadron in January 1940, one of the original squadrons of the 29th Bombardment Group. Its organization was part of the pre-World War II buildup of the United States Army Air Corps after the breakout of war in Europe. In May, it moved to MacDill Field, Florida, where it was equipped with a mix of pre-production YB-17s and early model Boeing B-17 Flying Fortresses and Douglas B-18 Bolos. The squadron was still at MacDill when the Japanese attacked Pearl Harbor, and it began to fly antisubmarine patrol missions in the Gulf of Mexico from January 1942. By the summer of 1942, the U-boat threat in the Gulf began to diminish, with all German submarines being withdrawn from the area by September.

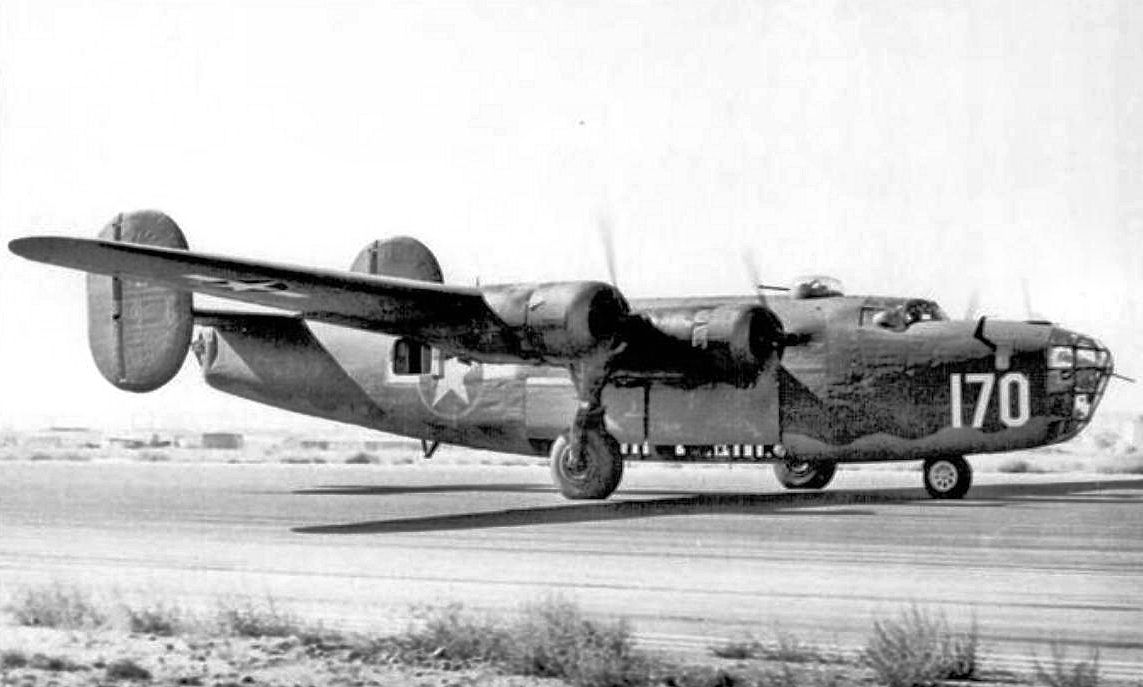
29th Bombardment Group B-24E Liberator in 1944

No longer needed in the Gulf, the squadron moved to Gowen Field, Idaho, where it became an Operational Training Unit (OTU) The OTU program involved the use of an oversized parent unit to provide cadres to "satellite groups". The 96th, 381st, 384th and 388th Bombardment Groups were all formed at Gowen in the second half of 1942.

In 1943, the squadron exchanged its B-17s for Consolidated B-24 Liberators. The squadron mission also changed as the Army Air Forces' (AAF) need for new units diminished and its need for replacements increased. The squadron became a Replacement Training Unit (RTU). Like OTUs, RTUs were oversized units, but their mission was to train individual pilots and aircrews. However, standard military units, like the 6th Squadron, were based on relatively inflexible tables of organization, and were not proving well adapted to the training mission. Accordingly, a more functional system was adopted in which each base was organized into a separate numbered unit. The 29th Bombardment Group and its squadrons (including the 6th) were inactivated. Its personnel and equipment, along with that of supporting units at Gowen Field were combined into the 212th AAF Base Unit (Combat Crew Training School, Heavy) on 1 April 1944.

==== Bombing Runs in the Pacific ====
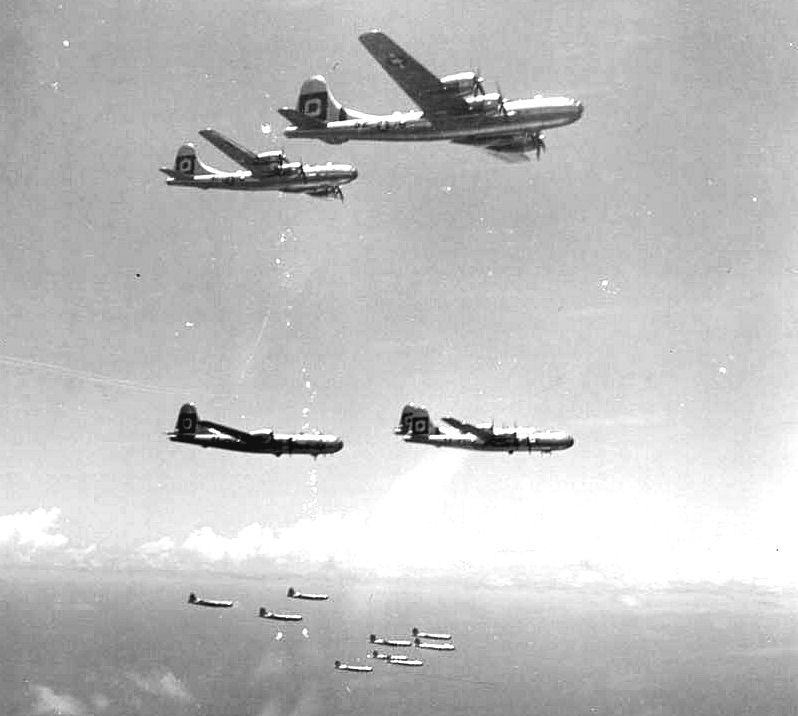
29th Bombardment Group B-29 Formation 1945

The AAF was organizing new Boeing B-29 Superfortress very heavy bombardment units, and the squadron was activated the same day at Pratt Army Air Field, Kansas. It briefly returned to flying B-17s until B-29s became available for training. It continued training with the Superfortress until December 1944. Training included long range overwater flights to Borinquen Field, Puerto Rico.

It deployed to North Field, Guam, where it became a component of the 314th Bombardment Wing of XXI Bomber Command. Its first combat mission was an attack of Tokyo on 25 February 1945. Until March 1945, it engaged primarily in daytime high altitude attacks on strategic targets, such as refineries and factories. The campaign against Japan switched that month and the squadron began to conduct low altitude night raids, using incendiaries against area targets. The squadron received a Distinguished Unit Citation (DUC) for a 31 March attack against an airfield at Omura, Japan. The squadron earned a second DUC in June for an attack on an industrial area of Shizuoka Prefecture, which included an aircraft factory operated by Mitsubishi and the Chigusa Arsenal.

During Operation Iceberg, the invasion of Okinawa, the squadron was diverted from the strategic campaign against Japanese industry and attacked airfields from which kamikaze attacks were being launched against the landing force. Following VJ Day, the squadron dropped food and supplies to Allied prisoners of war and participated in several show of force missions over Japan. It also conducted reconnaissance flights over Japanese cities. The squadron remained on Guam until it was inactivated in March 1946.

==== Post-World War II Drawdown ====
In June 1947, the squadron was activated in the reserve at Barksdale Field, Louisiana. Although nominally a bomber unit, the squadron used training aircraft to maintain proficiency under the supervision of the 174th AAF Base Unit (later the 2509th Air Force Reserve Training Center), and it is unclear whether it was fully manned. In September, the squadron was assigned to the 482d Bombardment Group, which was located at New Orleans Municipal Airport, Louisiana. President Truman's 1949 defense budget required reductions in the number of units in the Air Force. At the same time, Continental Air Command was converting its reserve units to the wing-base organization system. As a result, the squadron was inactivated in June 1949, as the 392d Bombardment Group absorbed the remaining reservists at Barksdale.

=== Air Refueling in the Cold War ===
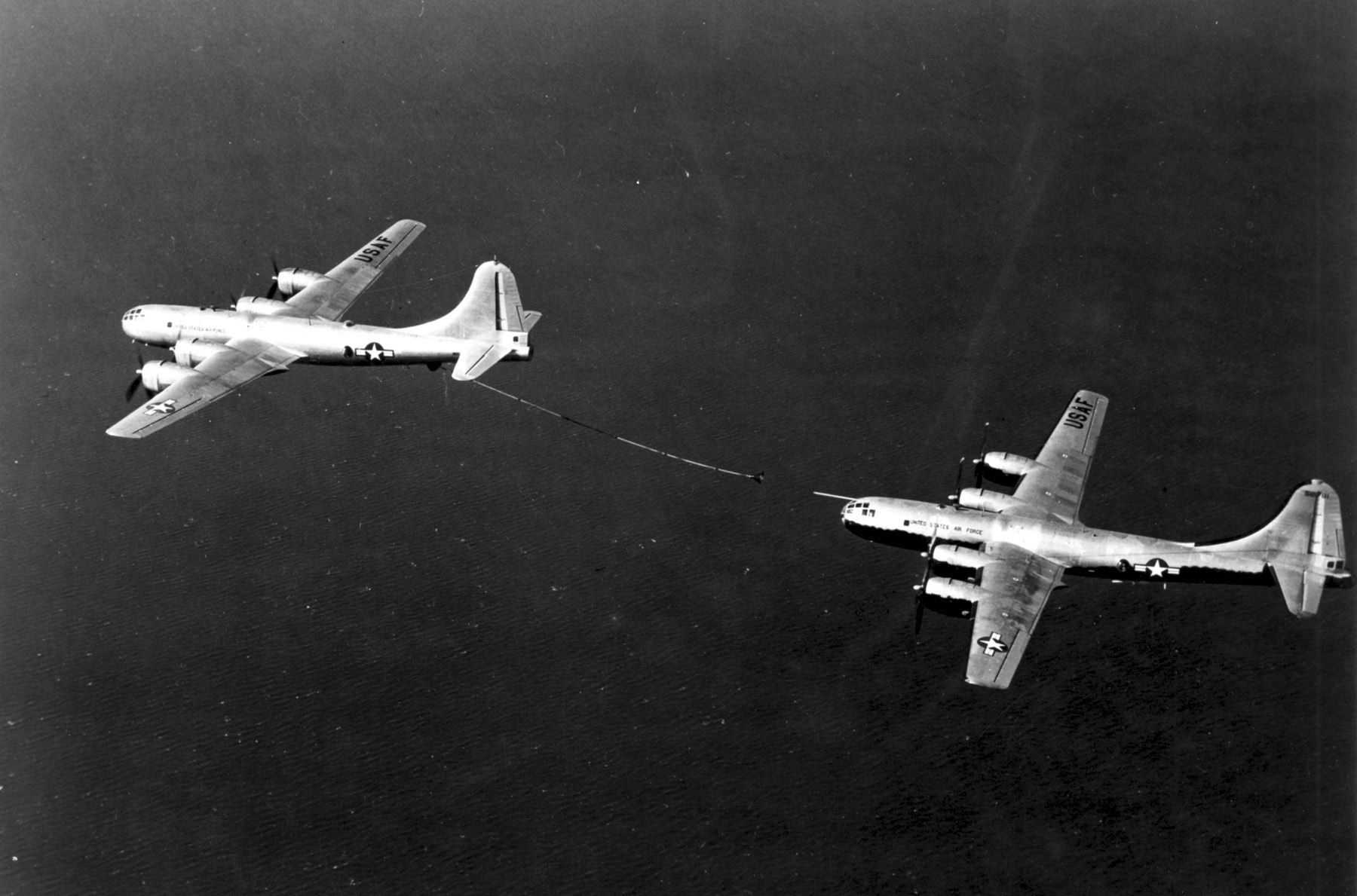
KB-29M Air Refueling

The 6th Air Refueling Squadron was activated at Walker Air Force Base, New Mexico in April 1951 and began to train with the KB-29 tanker version of the Superfortress. The bombardment squadrons of the 6th's parent 6th Bombardment Group were flying B-29s as well, but plans were underway by late summer to convert the group to Convair B-36 Peacemaker bombers, which lacked an air refueling capability. The squadron was inactivated on 1 August and its crews and airplanes were transferred to the 307th Air Refueling Squadron, which moved to Walker on paper from Davis-Monthan Air Force Base, Arizona.

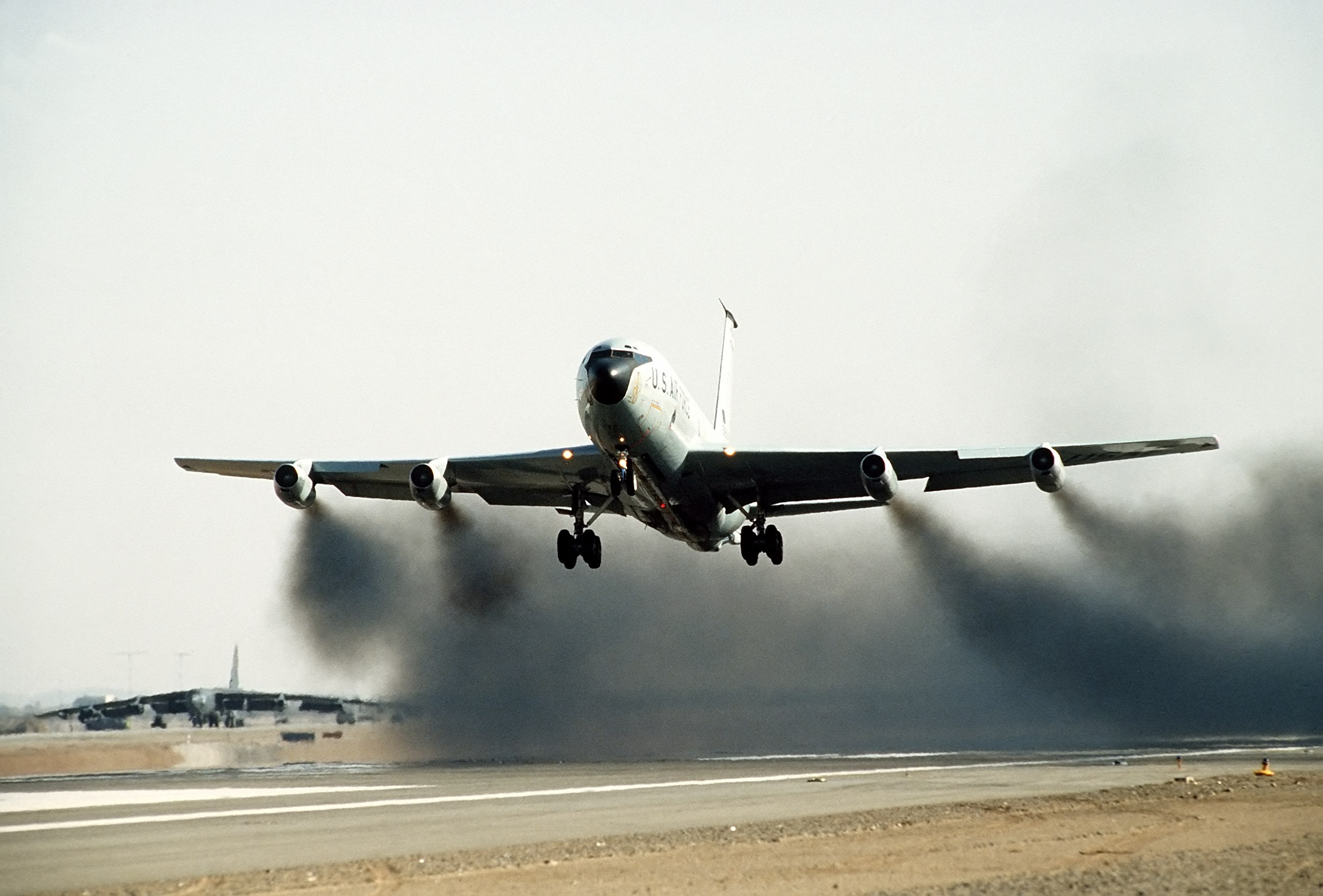
Boeing KC-135A taking off

By 1957, the 6th Bombardment Wing had transitioned to the Boeing B-52 Stratofortress and, therefore, once again had a need for air refueling aircraft. Meanwhile, at Bergstrom Air Force Base, Texas, Strategic Air Command (SAC) had transferred the fighters of its 27th Strategic Fighter Wing to Tactical Air Command in July 1957, but retained the 27th Wing's 27th Air Refueling Squadron. On 1 November, the 6th Squadron was again activated at Bergstrom, where it absorbed the remaining personnel of the 27th Squadron. (Note: The squadron did not assume the obsolescent KB-29s of the 27th, however. Kane (no aircraft assigned until 1958).)

In January 1958, the squadron returned to Walker AFB and the 6th Wing, where it began to fly the new Boeing KC-135 Stratotanker. Until 1962, when tanker training was concentrated at Castle Air Force Base, California, the squadron acted as a combat crew training unit for crews on the KC-135. Once its training mission was transferred, the squadron maintained half its aircraft on alert status. The squadron continued to maintain this alert commitment until shortly before its inactivation. The squadron also flew worldwide air refueling missions, including support of tactical aircraft flying in Southeast Asia.

During the Cuban Missile Crisis, SAC placed 2 additional B-52s from each of its wings on ground alert (Note: This did not include the new B-52Hs. Kipp, et al.., p. 34.) and placed 1/8 of its B-52 force on airborne alert. To support the expanded bomber alert force, additional KC-135 tankers had to be placed on alert. On 24 October 1962, SAC went to DEFCON 2, placing all the squadron's remaining aircraft on alert.

In December 1965, the first B-52Bs started leaving the operational inventory. This reduction resulted in the end of 6th Wing activities at Walker including the inactivation of the squadron, and the closure of Walker Air Force Base in 1967.

On 19 September 1985 the 6th Air Refueling Squadron was consolidated with the 6th Bombardment Squadron.

The consolidated squadron was activated in 1989 at March Air Force Base, California as a McDonnell Douglas KC-10 Extender unit and assigned to the 22d Air Refueling Wing. The squadron again flew worldwide air refueling missions, including support of deployments to Southwest Asia from 1990 through 1991. In June 1992, the Air Force reorganized its major commands. This reorganization involved the transfer of the 22d Wing to the new Air Mobility Command, which combined air refueling and airlift elements of the Air Force into a single command. Under the new command, the squadron provided humanitarian airlift to Somalia from 1992 to 1993.

The 1991 Base Realignment and Closure Commission recommended that March be transferred to Air Force Reserve Command. As a result of the turnover to the reserves, the 22d Wing moved to McConnell Air Force Base, Kansas in January 1994. The squadron remained at March until August 1995, when it moved to Travis Air Force Base, California and became part of the 60th Air Mobility Wing. In the interim, it was assigned to the 722d Operations Group, which controlled regular flying units at March until the base was fully converted to a reserve base. Since 2001, the squadron has provided air refueling support for the global war on terrorism

=== Keeping the Peace in the Middle East ===
==== The Gulf War ====
In the Summer of 1990, following the invasion of Kuwait by Iraq Dictator Saddam Hussein, 43 KC-10 Extenders were deployed to the Persian Gulf. Members of the 6th ARS conducted round the clock flying operations supporting all aspects of air operations via their versatile refueling capability. Unlike the aging KC-135, which could only be configured to refuel using a Boom, or Drogue, the KC-10 supports both methods simultaneously. This proved immensely valuable in both the Gulf War, and later conflicts which involved a large variety of receiver aircraft from different branches, and coalition partners. The KC-10's versatility in Air Refueling wasn't its only advantage. In a conflict where the Military Airlift Command's cargo transport capability was all but saturated, the KC-10's widebody design allowed for the organic movement of critical cargo loads to support other aircraft in the Air War -including B-52, KC-135, RC-135, and U-2. According to a report by the Government Accountability Office, by the end of the war, U.S. tankers flew 14,000 sorties, offloading 725 million pounds of fuel to roughly 50,000 receiver aircraft throughout the conflict.

==== Transition to the KC-46 Pegasus ====
On July 28th, 2023, the 6th Air Refueling Squadron welcomed the first Boeing KC-46 Pegasus tanker aircraft to Travis Air Force Base. The Secretary of the Air Force at the time, Deborah Lee James, had selected the 6th Air Refueling Squadron, along with its sister squadron, the 9th Air Refueling Squadron, as preferred locations for the second round of KC-46 basing locations. In order to be able to accommodate the new aircraft, Travis AFB launched a $136.2 Million construction project in 2018 to build a new 3-bay hangar. The hangar was completed in 2023, and the first new aircraft were flown from Boeing Field in Seattle, Washington shortly thereafter. By September 2024, the Air Force had completely divested of the McDonnell Douglas KC-10 Extender, and as of September 2025, the 6th ARS shares 17 KC-46 tanker aircraft with the 9th Air Refueling Squadron, with plans for a final total of 24 aircraft to be stationed at the base.

== Lineage ==
6th Bombardment Squadron

- Constituted as the 6th Bombardment Squadron (Heavy) on 22 December 1939

Activated on 1 February 1940
Redesignated 6th Bombardment Squadron, Very Heavy on 28 March 1944
Inactivated on 1 April 1944

- Activated on 1 April 1944

Inactivated on 20 May 1946
Activated in the reserve on 15 June 1947
Inactivated on 27 June 1949
Consolidated with the 6th Air Refueling Squadron as the 6th Air Refueling Squadron on 19 September 1985

6th Air Refueling Squadron

- Constituted as the 6th Air Refueling Squadron, Medium on 6 April 1951

Activated on 10 April 1951
Inactivated on 1 August 1951
Redesignated 6th Air Refueling Squadron, Heavy on 1 April 1957
Activated on 1 November 1957
Discontinued and inactivated on 25 January 1967
Consolidated with the 6th Bombardment Squadron on 19 September 1985
Activated on 3 January 1989
Redesignated 6th Air Refueling Squadron on 1 September 1991

=== Assignments ===
- 29th Bombardment Group, 1 February 1940 – 1 April 1944
- 29th Bombardment Group, 1 April – 20 May 1946
- Tenth Air Force, 15 June 1947
- 482d Bombardment Group, 30 September 1947 – 27 June 1949
- 6th Bombardment Group, 10 April 1951 – 1 August 1951
- Fifteenth Air Force, 1 November 1957
- 6th Bombardment Wing (later 6 Strategic Aerospace Wing), 3 January 1958 – 25 January 1967
- 22d Air Refueling Wing, 3 January 1989
- 22d Operations Group, 1 September 1991
- 722d Operations Group, 1 January 1994
- 60th Operations Group, 1 August 1995 – present

=== Stations ===
- Langley Field, Virginia, 1 February 1940
- MacDill Field, Florida 21 May 1940
- Gowen Field, Idaho 25 June 1942 – 1 April 1944
- Pratt Army Air Field, Kansas 1 April – 7 December 1944
- North Field, Guam, 17 January 1945 – 20 May 1946
- Barksdale Field (later Barksdale Air Force Base), Louisiana, 15 June 1947 – 27 June 1949
- Walker Air Force Base, New Mexico, 10 April 1951 – 1 August 1951
- Bergstrom Air Force Base, Texas, 1 November 1957
- Walker Air Force Base, New Mexico, 3 January 1958 – 25 January 1967
- March Air Force Base, California, 3 January 1989
- Travis Air Force Base, California, 1 August 1995 – present

=== Aircraft ===
- Boeing YB-17 Flying Fortress (1940)
- Boeing B-17 Flying Fortress (1940–1943, 1944)
- Douglas B-18 Bolo (1940–1941)
- Consolidated B-24 Liberator (1943–1944)
- Boeing B-29 Superfortress (1944–1946)
- North American AT-6 Texan (1947–1949)
- Beechcraft AT-11 Kansan (1947–1949)
- Boeing KB-29 Superfortress (1951)
- Boeing KC-135 Stratotanker (1958–1967)
- McDonnell Douglas KC-10 Extender (1989 – 2024)
- Boeing KC-46 Pegasus (2024 – present)

=== Awards and campaigns ===
Award streamer	Award	Dates	Notes
	Distinguished Unit Citation	Japan, 31 March 1945	6th Bombardment Squadron
	Distinguished Unit Citation	Japan, Japan, 19–26 June 1945	6th Bombardment Squadron
	Air Force Meritorious Unit Award	1 July 2005-30 June 2007	6th Air Refueling Squadron
	Air Force Outstanding Unit Award	1 May 1960-31 May 1962	6th Air Refueling Squadron
	Air Force Outstanding Unit Award	1 February-30 June 1989	6th Air Refueling Squadron
	Air Force Outstanding Unit Award	1 July 1989-30 June 1991	6th Air Refueling Squadron
	Air Force Outstanding Unit Award	1 July 1993-30 June 1995	6th Air Refueling Squadron
	Air Force Outstanding Unit Award	1 August 1995-30 July 1997	6th Air Refueling Squadron
	Air Force Outstanding Unit Award	31 July 1997-30 June 1999	6th Air Refueling Squadron
	Air Force Outstanding Unit Award	1 July 1999-30 June 2000	6th Air Refueling Squadron
	Air Force Outstanding Unit Award	1 July 2000-30 June 2001	6th Air Refueling Squadron
	Air Force Outstanding Unit Award	1 July 2001-30 June 2003	6th Air Refueling Squadron
	Air Force Outstanding Unit Award	1 July 2003-30 June 2004	6th Air Refueling Squadron
	Air Force Outstanding Unit Award	1 July 2004-30 July 2005	6th Air Refueling Squadron
	Air Force Outstanding Unit Award	1 July 2007-30 June 2009	6th Air Refueling Squadron
	Air Force Outstanding Unit Award	1 July 2018-30 June 2019	6th Air Refueling Squadron

Campaign Streamer	Campaign	Dates	Notes
	American Theater without inscription	7 December 1941 – 7 December 1944	6th Bombardment Squadron
	Antisubmarine	January 1942–24 June 1942	6th Bombardment Squadron
	Air Offensive, Japan	17 January 1945 – 2 September 1945	6th Bombardment Squadron
	Western Pacific	17 April 1945 – 2 September 1945	6th Bombardment Squadron
	Global War on Terror	11 September 2001 – Present	6th Air Refueling Squadron

== See also ==
- List of United States Air Force air refueling squadrons
- B-17 Flying Fortress units of the United States Army Air Forces
- B-24 Liberator units of the United States Army Air Forces
- List of B-29 Superfortress operators
