= Donnington Airpark =

Donnington Airpark Woodstock Airport
- IATA: none; ICAO: YDOP

Summary
- Airport type: Public
- Operator: Doris I. Smith
- Location: Woodstock, Queensland, Australia
- Elevation AMSL: 250 ft / 76 m
- Coordinates: 19°36′06″S 146°50′33″E

Map
- Location in Queensland

Runways
Direction	Length		Surface
Direction	m	ft	Surface
11/29	930	3,051	Grass
- Sources: AIP

Donnington Airpark (ICAO: YDOP) is located on the Flinders Highway at Woodstock, a suburb of Townsville in Australia. It is also known as Woodstock Airport and has been a popular venue for air shows and fly-in events since its opening in 1970.

== History ==
Several wartime airfields were built at Woodstock by the 46th and 91st Engineer Battalions of the United States Army during 1942. Although near Donnington Airpark, these runways fell into disrepair following the end of World War II. The current facilities and associated grass runways were constructed on virgin bushland by Ray Smith in 1969, who intended to develop the 160-acre site as a satellite airfield to Townsville Airport for general aviation users.

The Donnington Country Fly-In, later known as the Donnington Airshow and Country Fly-In, was held annually at Donnington Airpark from 1979 to 1993. It showcased a wide range of aircraft types, from ultralights and gyrocopters to commercial, military and warbirds, with associated historic vehicle displays, trade displays and entertainment. Although not financially viable, the events raised funds for both the Royal Flying Doctor Service of Australia (RFDS) and construction of the Vietnam Forces National Memorial in Canberra.

== Accidents and incidents ==
- On 10 February 2015, a Lockwood Drifter departed Donnington Airpark in company with a Thruster ultralight for a local flight. The aircraft collided mid-air about 7 km (4.3 mi) south of the airfield. Both broke up in-flight, killing the pilots who were the only people on board. The accident was investigated by Recreational Aviation Australia (RA-Aus), as well as the Queensland Coroner's Court. In handing down his findings, the coroner noted that while the Civil Aviation Safety Authority had delegated administration of ultralight category aircraft to RA-Aus, as a private company, the organisation lacked the legislative protections afforded to the Australian Transport Safety Board as a Commonwealth organisation. This discrepancy could potentially compromise safety by opening RA-Aus to litigation and defamation action when publishing findings of accident investigations.

== See also ==
- List of airports in Queensland
