= Guiuan Airport =

Airport in Guiuan, Eastern Samar, Philippines

Guiuan Airport Paliparan ng Guiuan Luparan han Guiuan
- IATA: none; ICAO: RPVG

Summary
- Airport type: Public
- Operator: Civil Aviation Authority of the Philippines
- Serves: Guiuan, Eastern Samar
- Elevation AMSL: 60 m / 197 ft
- Coordinates: 11°02′07″N 125°44′29″E
- Interactive map of Guiuan Airport

Runways
Direction	Length		Surface
Direction	m	ft	Surface
07/25	2,094	6,870	Asphalt
- Source: DAFIF

Guiuan Airport (ICAO: RPVG) is an airport located in the municipality of Guiuan, in the province of Eastern Samar in the Philippines. It is classified as a feeder airport by the Civil Aviation Authority of the Philippines, an attached agency of the Department of Transportation that is responsible for the operations all airports in the Philippines, except the major international airports.

Presently, the government is planning to develop the airport to support the commercial and tourism industry in the region, most especially Calicoan Island, an upcoming island resort for surfers and beachcombers.

== History ==
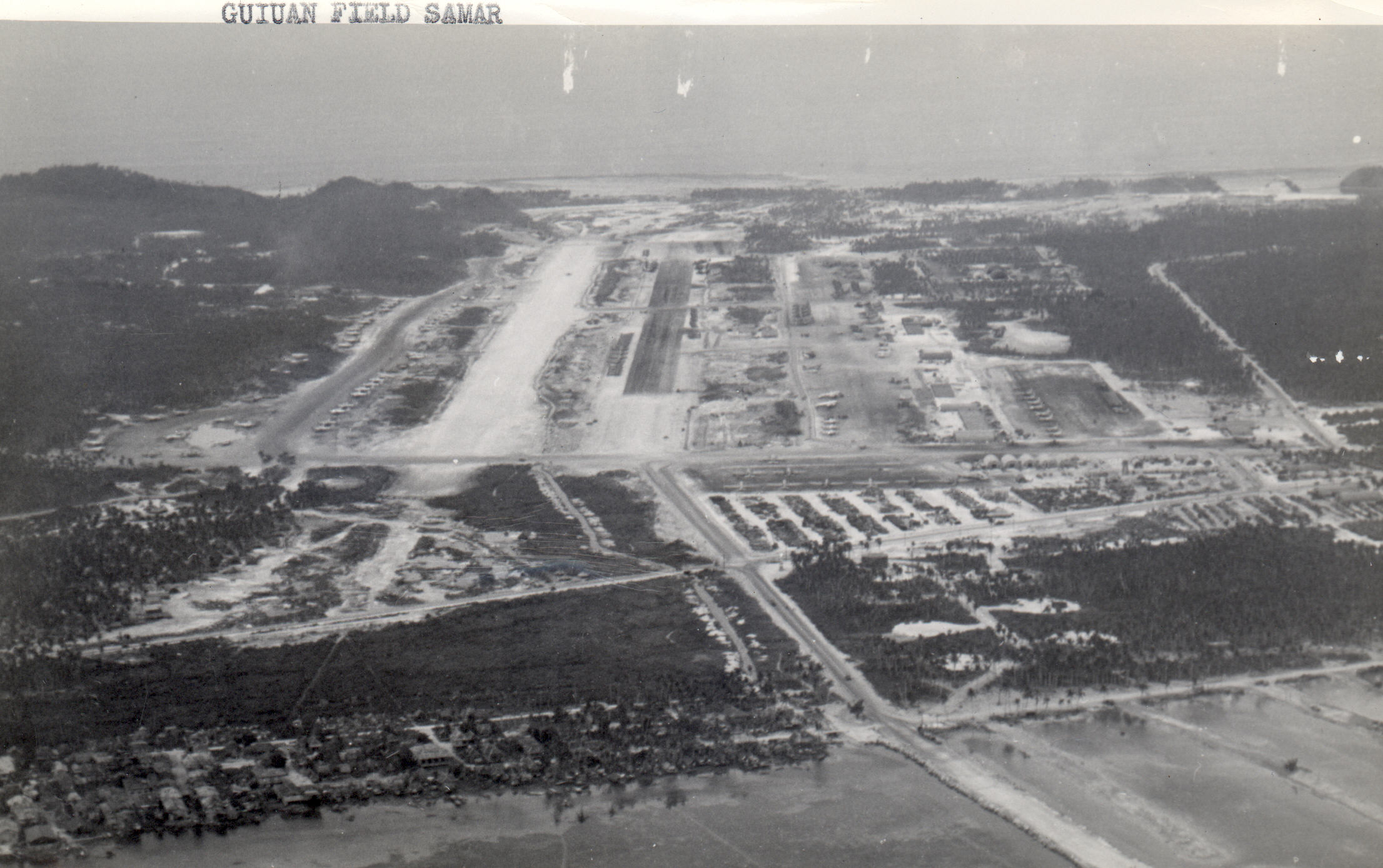
Aerial view of Guiuan Airfield during the Allied Occupation.

Guiuan Airport was originally a United States Navy air base in World War II built by Seabees from the 61st and 93rd Naval Construction Battalions.

After forces led by General Douglas Macarthur landed on Leyte on October 20, 1944, the first step towards the liberation of the Philippines from Japanese occupation, work began on improving or constructing several airfields around the area.

The US Navy initially attempted to construct a strip on the Samar shore of San Pablo Bay. It was soon found to be unusable after heavy rain, so the project was abandoned. After a brief search, Navy engineers settled on Guiuan, a town on the southeast promontory of Samar. Work was conducted by the 93rd Seabees and the first plane landed on December 18, 1944. US Navy and US Army Air Force aircraft were operating on the field by Christmas 1944.

The strip was used by corsairs of the marines stationed there as well as the 22nd and 5th Bombardment Groups of the Army Air Force. The 22nd Bombardment Group arrived on 21 January 1945.

The 61st NCB built the two airstrips that were the Guiuan Airbase. The 61st camp was right next to the ramp where the 22nd bomb group was and next to it the 5th bomb group. There were also about a dozen Corsairs, but you usually saw only six parked at the strip at any one time.

Probably the biggest landing force to land at any airbase in the Pacific War took place at Guiuan before the invasion of Luzon. A typhoon was headed for the task force and all the flying aircraft that could go went in one formation from all the carriers to Guiuan which had two six thousand foot runways built by the 61st NCB. The formation flew over then broke up and landed at the front end near the B-24 ramps and at the middle of the strips. The planes were landing in formations and then taxied to parking areas maybe four aircraft huddled next to each of the B-24's of the 22nd and 5th bomb groups and planes down both sides of the runways. The crews then moved into the 4 man tents of the Army Air Force with double the guys while part of that rainy typhoon hit.

After the war, the airfield was turned over to the Philippine government.

The Guiuan airfield originally had two runways, but only one remains operational today.

Guian Airport became the Samar Island Hub for the 2013 Typhoon Haiyan relief operations.

U.S. Marine Corps HC-130 Hercules aircraft assigned to the 3rd Marine Expeditionary Brigade and other military aircraft sit on the tarmac at an airport in Guiuan, Philippines, waiting to airlift Philippine 131117-N-XN177-381

On December 14, 2018, a Philippine Air Force C-130 Hercules flew from Villamor Air Base in Manila to Guiuan Airport, carrying the three Balangiga Bells which had been retrieved from United States after being taken by the U.S. Army 117 years earlier from the Catholic church in Balangiga.
