= No. 24 Squadron RSAF =

- Active: Unknown - present
- Country: Saudi Arabia
- Branch: Royal Saudi Air Force
- Type: Squadron
- Role: Airborne refueling
- Part of: RSAF 4 Wing
- Base: Prince Sultan Air Base, Al-Kharj
- Aircraft: Airbus A330-203 MRTT; Airbus A330-243 MRTT

No. 24 Squadron RSAF is a squadron of the Royal Saudi Air Force that operates the Airbus A330-203 MRTT and A330-243 MRTT from Prince Sultan Air Base, Al-Kharj, Riyadh Province in Saudi Arabia within RSAF 4 Wing.
