= No. 32 Squadron RSAF =

- Active: Unknown-present
- Country: Saudi Arabia
- Branch: Royal Saudi Air Force
- Type: Squadron
- Part of: RSAF 4 Wing
- Base: Prince Sultan Air Base, Al-Kharj
- Aircraft: Lockheed KC-130H Hercules; Lockheed KC-130J Hercules

No. 32 Squadron RSAF is a squadron of the Royal Saudi Air Force that operates the Lockheed KC-130H Hercules and the KC-130J Hercules at Prince Sultan Air Base, Al-Kharj, Riyadh Province in Saudi Arabia within RSAF 4 Wing.
