= No. 41 Squadron RSAF =

Saudi Arabian military unit

- Active: Unknown-present
- Country: Saudi Arabia
- Branch: Royal Saudi Air Force
- Type: Squadron
- Part of: RSAF 14 Wing
- Base: Prince Sultan Air Base, Al-Kharj
- Aircraft: Beechcraft King Air 350i

No. 41 Squadron RSAF is a squadron of the Royal Saudi Air Force that operates the Beechcraft King Air 350i at Prince Sultan Air Base, Al-Kharj, Riyadh Province in Saudi Arabia as part of RSAF 14 Wing.
