= No. 60 Squadron RSAF =

- Active: Unknown-present
- Country: Saudi Arabia
- Branch: Royal Saudi Air Force
- Type: Squadron
- Part of: RSAF 14 Wing
- Base: Prince Sultan Air Base, Al-Kharj
- Aircraft: Saab 2000AEW&C

No. 60 Squadron RSAF is a squadron of the Royal Saudi Air Force that operates the Saab 2000 AEW&C at Prince Sultan Air Base, Al-Kharj, Riyadh Province in Saudi Arabia within RSAF 14 Wing.
