= No. 23 Squadron RSAF =

- Active: Unknown-present
- Country: Saudi Arabia
- Branch: Royal Saudi Air Force
- Type: Squadron
- Part of: RSAF 4 Wing
- Base: Prince Sultan Air Base, Al-Kharj
- Aircraft: Boeing KE-3A

No. 23 Squadron RSAF is a squadron of the Royal Saudi Air Force that operates the Boeing KE-3A at Prince Sultan Air Base, Al-Kharj, Riyadh Province in Saudi Arabia within RSAF 4 Wing.
