= 908th Expeditionary Air Refueling Squadron =

908th Expeditionary Air Refueling Squadron

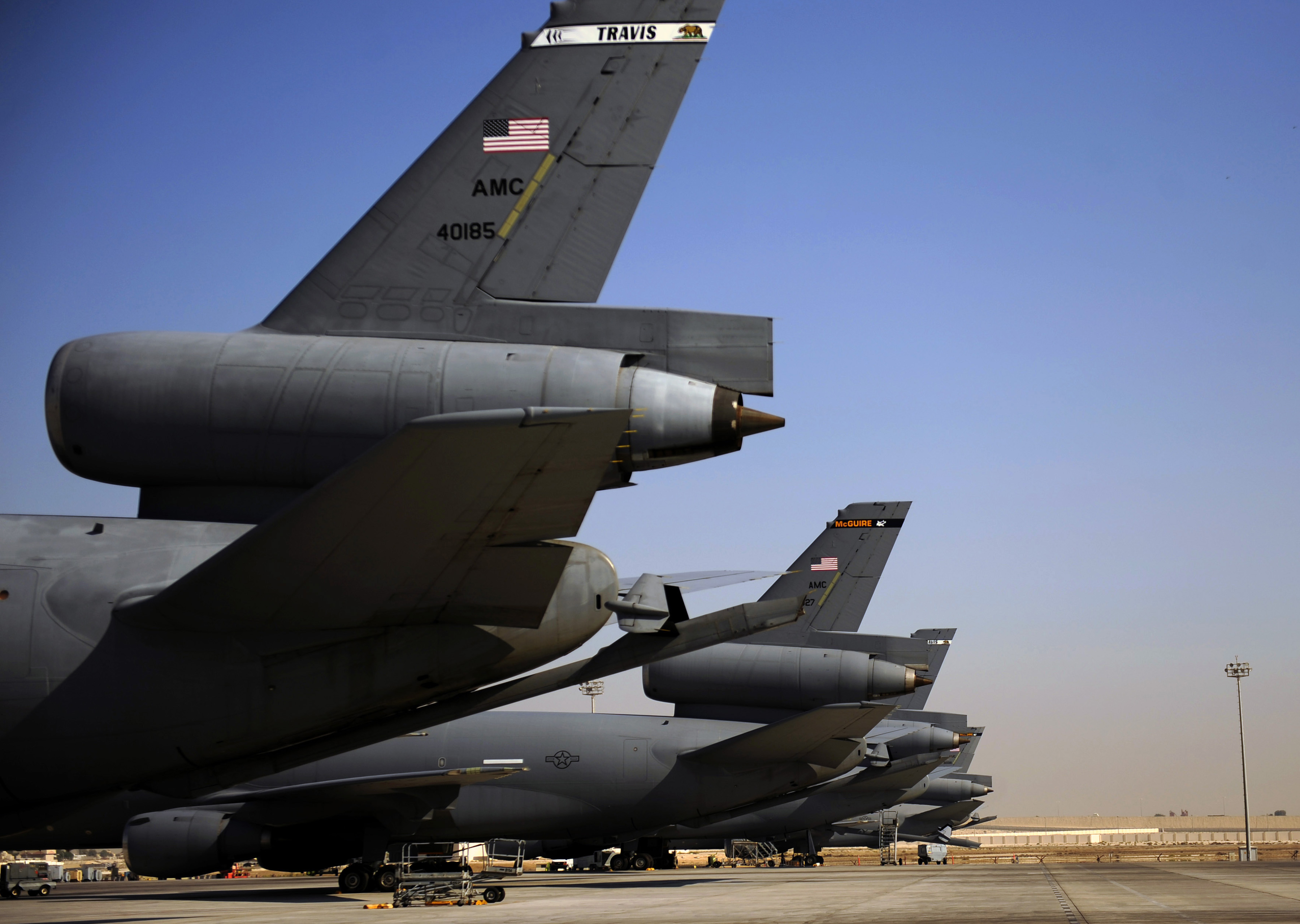
- 908th Expeditionary Air Refueling Squadron KC-10 Extenders in Southwest Asia, 2010
- Active: 1917–1919; 1921–1922; 1922–1928; 1936–1946; 1958–1962; 1963–1977; 2002–2023
- Country: United States
- Branch: United States Air Force
- Role: Air Refueling
- Part of: Air Forces Central Command
- Garrison/HQ: Prince Sultan Air Base, Saudi Arabia
- Engagements: South West Pacific Theater of World War II; Iraq War; War in Afghanistan (2001–2021); War in Iraq; Military intervention against ISIL
- Decorations: Distinguished Unit Citation Philippine Republic Presidential Unit Citation

Insignia
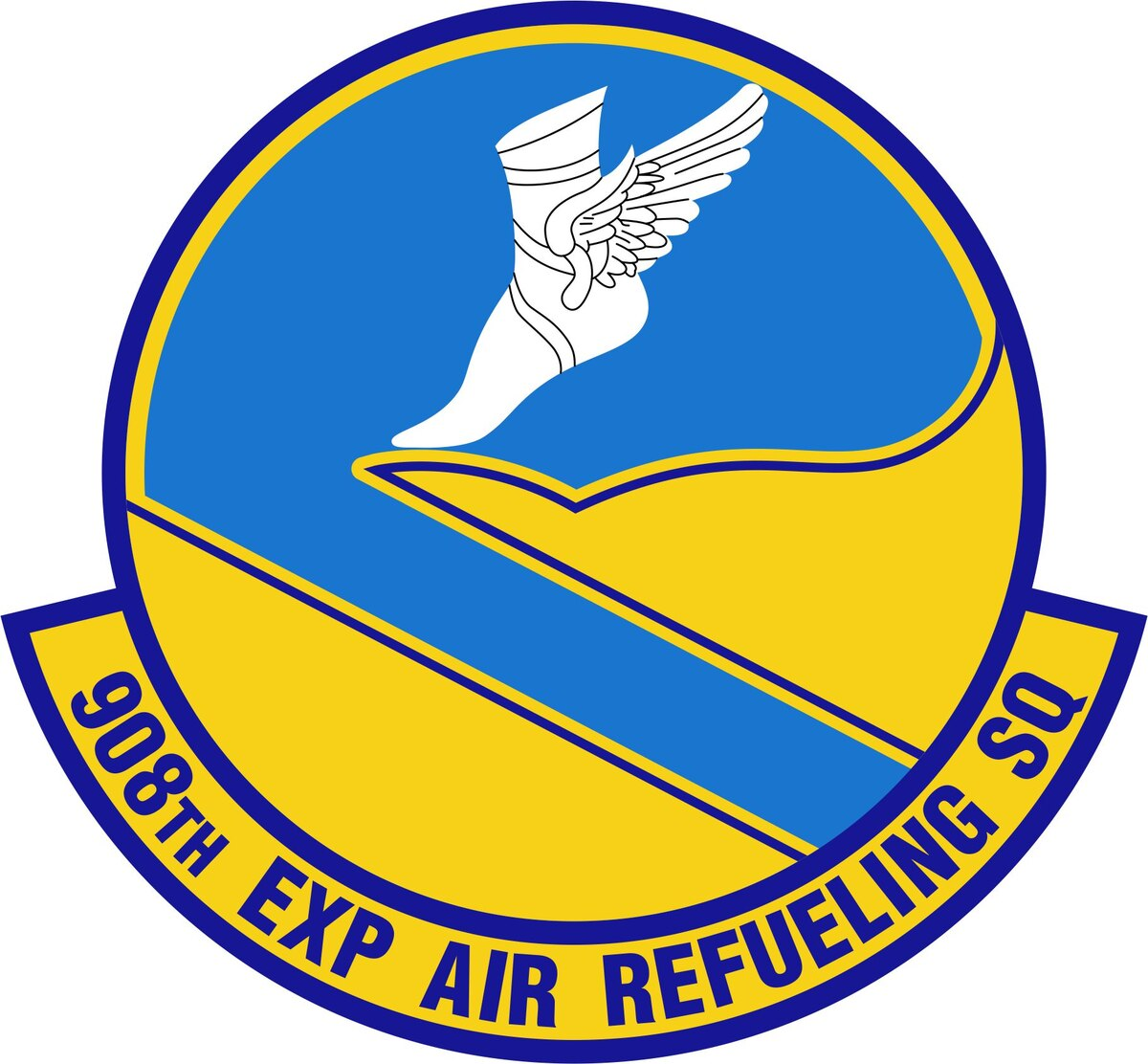
- 908th Expeditionary Air Refueling Squadron emblem (Note: Approved 20 December 2017 based on emblem approved for 18th Headquarters Squadron c. 1925.)

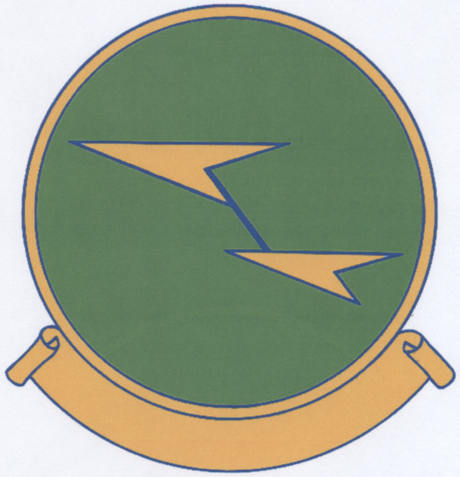
- 908th Air Refueling Squadron emblem

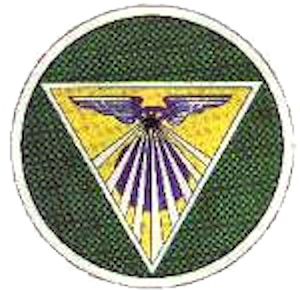
- 408th Bombardment Squadron emblem on a green disc (Note: Approved 9 February 1937 for the 18th Reconnaissance Squadron. Description: On a yellow equilateral triangle, one point down, with a silver border, a winged eye above a sphere both blue; coming from the eye and spreading fanwise over the sphere nine silver rays, spaced one and eight terminating to the border.)

Aircraft flown
- Tanker: McDonnell Douglas KC-10A Extender

The 908th Expeditionary Air Refueling Squadron is a provisional United States Air Force (USAF) unit. It was assigned to the 378th Air Expeditionary Wing at Prince Sultan Air Base in Saudi Arabia. It has supported combat operations in the War in Afghanistan (2001–2021), Iraq, and Syria from its previous location of Al Dhafra Air Base in the United Arab Emirates. The squadron has a varied background, having been formed by a series of consolidations of no fewer than five distinct units.

The squadron is one of the oldest in the USAF. Its origins date to 16 June 1917, when the 18th Aero Squadron was organized at Rockwell Field, San Diego, California. This unit served as a pilot training squadron during World War I until it was demobilized in 1919. A second predecessor was also active under the same name at Rockwell for nine months in the early 1920s.

The third predecessor of the squadron was the 18th Headquarters Squadron, which served as the host Air Corps unit at Bolling Field, District of Columbia from 1922 until 1928.

The fourth predecessor of the squadron was the 18th Reconnaissance Squadron, which was activated at Langley Field, Virginia in 1936. The squadron saw combat during World War II as the 408th Bombardment Squadron in the South West Pacific Theater of World War II, where it earned two Distinguished Unit Citations and a Philippine Republic Presidential Unit Citation. Elements of the squadron also participated in the Battle of Midway. It was inactivated in the Philippines in 1946.

The 408th Bombardment Squadron was again activated at March Air Force Base, California in 1958 as part of Strategic Air Command (SAC) during the expansion of Boeing B-47 Stratojet wings during the Cold War. It was inactivated as the B-47 was being replaced by the longer-ranged Boeing B-52 Stratofortress.

The unit's fifth predecessor was also part of SAC as the 908th Air Refueling Squadron, stationed at Kincheloe Air Force Base, Michigan equipped with Boeing KC-135 Stratotankers. It stood alert at Kincheloe and deployed aircrews and aircraft to support combat operations in Vietnam until it was inactivated when the Air Force closed the base.

The squadron was converted to provisional status in March 2002 as part of the war on terror. It has served as a McDonnell Douglas KC-10 Extender squadron in Southwest Asia since then, with KC-10 aircraft added in late 2003 until 2023.

== History ==
=== World War I ===
The first predecessor of the squadron was established in the summer of 1917 as the Air Service 18th Aero Squadron, (Note: Another 18th Aero Squadron had been activated at Kelly Field, Texas in June 1917. It was redesignated as the 23d Aero Squadron (Repair) in June 1917. Maurer, Combat Squadrons, pp. 121–122) training aviation students during World War I at Rockwell Field in southern California. The squadron apparently operated Curtiss JN-4 and improved Curtiss JN-6 "Jenny" two-seat trainers and Thomas-Morse S-4 single-seat advanced trainers. In July 1918, it was redesignated as Squadron B, Rockwell Field. It was demobilized in late 1918 when the training squadrons at Rockwell were combined into a single flying school detachment.

=== Interwar period ===
The second predecessor of the squadron was established at Rockwell in 1921 as the 18th Squadron (Observation). Its mission as an observation squadron was to fly aerial photographic missions and to act as an airborne observation post during maneuvers, but it is not certain that the squadron was manned or equipped. It was inactivated nine months after its activation.

The third predecessor of the squadron was organized in 1922 as the Headquarters Detachment, Bolling Field, District of Columbia. It replaced the 99th Squadron (Observation) as the Air Service host unit at Bolling responsible for station administration. In 1924 the detachment was expanded to a squadron and the following year, it was redesignated the 18th Headquarters Squadron and consolidated with the two previous 18th squadrons. The squadron operated various aircraft at Bolling. It was inactivated in 1928 and was replaced as the Air Corps host by the Air Corps Detachment, Bolling Field.

The fourth predecessor of the squadron was established in 1935 as the 18th Observation Squadron and activated in September 1936 at Mitchel Field on Long Island, New York. In this reorganization of General Headquarters Air Force, each bombardment group had an attached reconnaissance squadron, which operated the same aircraft as that group's assigned bombardment squadrons. It was assigned to the 2d Wing of General Headquarters Air Force and equipped with Martin B-10 bombers, while attached to the 9th Bombardment Group. The squadron flew reconnaissance and coastal patrol flights over Long Island Sound and southern New England. The squadron received Douglas B-18 Bolos in 1937 along with a mixture of obsolete attack and light observation aircraft in the build-up before World War II The unit received early model Martin B-26 Marauders while retaining its B-18s.

=== World War II ===
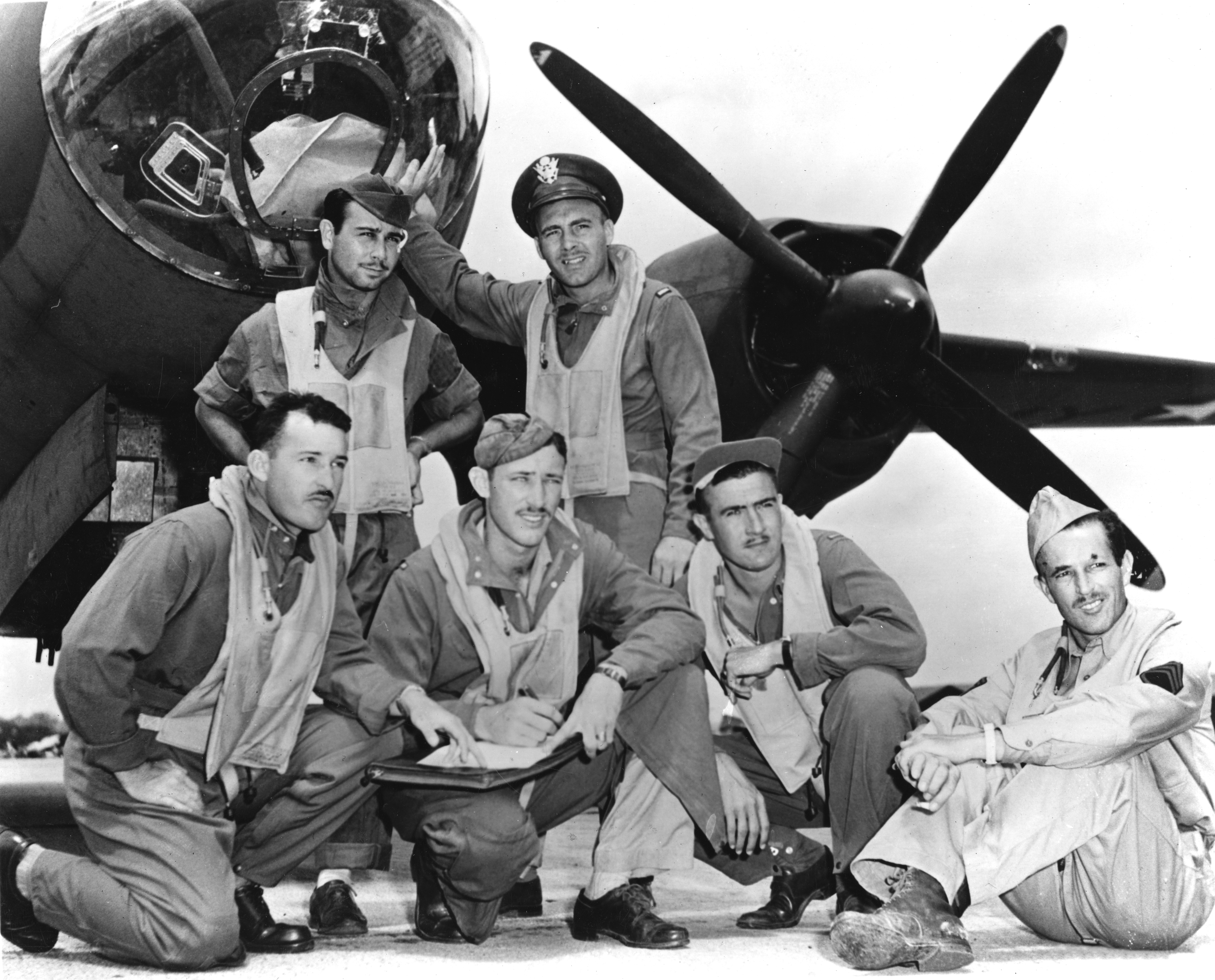
The crew of B-26 40-1391 "Susie-Q" of the 408th after making a torpedo attack at the Battle of Midway

After the Pearl Harbor Attack, the squadron was transferred to the West Coast, flying antisubmarine patrols from Muroc Army Air Field, California from December 1941 to the end of January 1942. It was then assigned to Fifth Air Force. By the time the squadron arrived in the Southwest Pacific Theater the situation on the Philippines was desperate, and the squadron was based in Australia, where it was redesignated as the 408th Bombardment Squadron.

While the squadron was stationed at Reid River Airfield, Australia, two of the squadron's aircraft were diverted from their flight to Australia and flew missions during the Battle of Midway between 29 May 1942 and 4 June 1942. These aircraft operated under the control of the Navy, whose Patrol Wing Two controlled both Army and Navy aircraft operating from Midway. They were armed with torpedoes and on 4 June, along with two B-26s of the 69th Bombardment Squadron of VII Bomber Command, attacked the enemy fleet. They met with heavy antiaircraft fire and opposition from enemy fighters. Two of the Marauders were shot down. Although the other two made successful attacks, both aircraft crash landed upon their return to Midway. From Australia, the 408th also attacked Japanese targets on Papua New Guinea and New Britain. Its actions in New Guinea earned the squadron two Distinguished Unit Citations. In October 1943 the B-26 Marauders were joined by North American B-25 Mitchells, and for the rest of the year the group continued to operate in support of Allied troops on New Guinea.

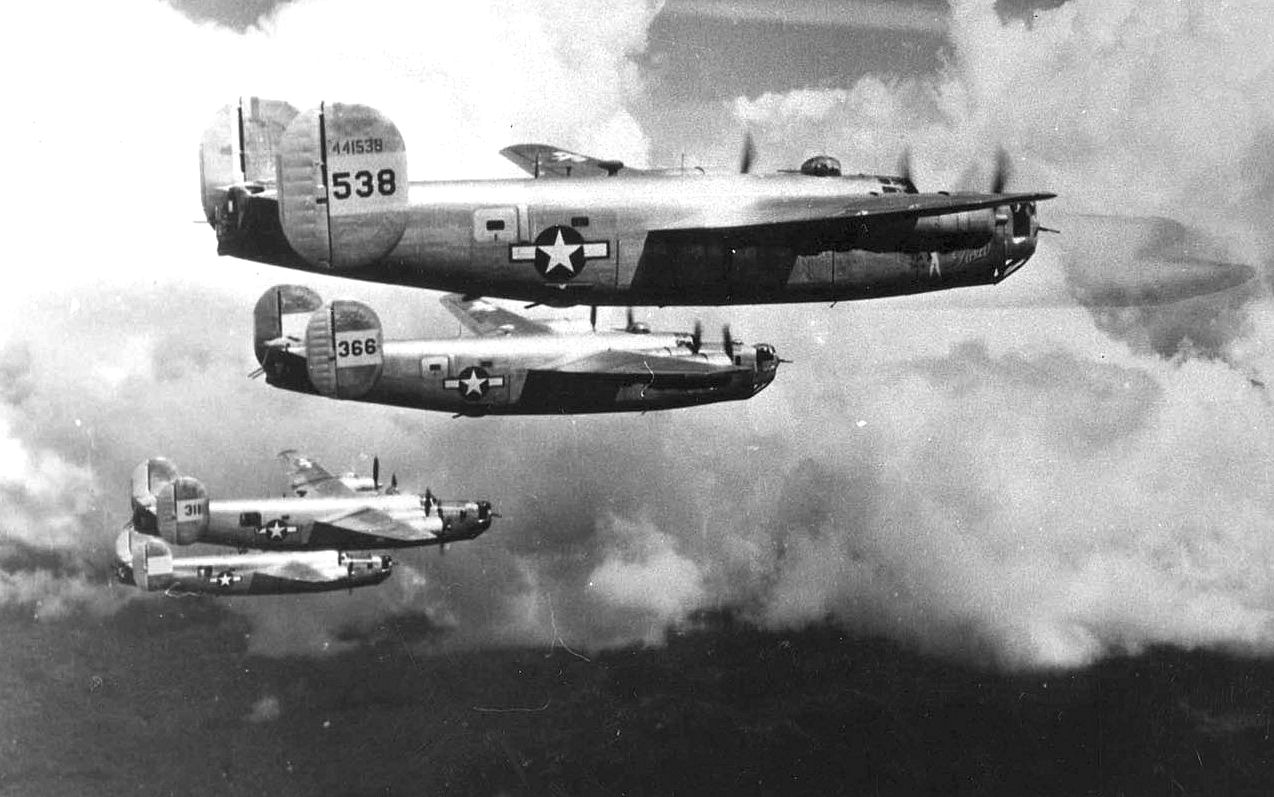
B-24 Liberators of the 22d Bomb Group

While stationed at Nadzab Airfield in February 1944 the unit converted to Consolidated B-24 Liberators optimized for long range bombing missions. While transitioning, the squadron was attached to the 309th Bombardment Wing for operational control. With the new bombers came a designation as a heavy bomber unit. The squadron's Liberators attacked targets on Borneo, Ceram and Halmahera, among them the crucial oil fields of the Dutch East Indies. In September 1944 the squadron moved its attention to the Philippines, attacking targets on Leyte. It moved to Leyte on 15 November 1944. From then until August 1945 it flew against targets on Luzon, as well as supporting the campaign on Borneo and even ranging as far as China. Its actions in the Philippines won it a Philippine Presidential Unit Citation. Finally, in August 1945 the unit moved to Okinawa, from where it flew a number of armed reconnaissance missions over southern Japan. The squadron moved on paper to the Philippines in November, leaving its personnel and equipment behind on Okinawa. It was inactivated at Fort William McKinley in early 1946.

=== Cold War ===
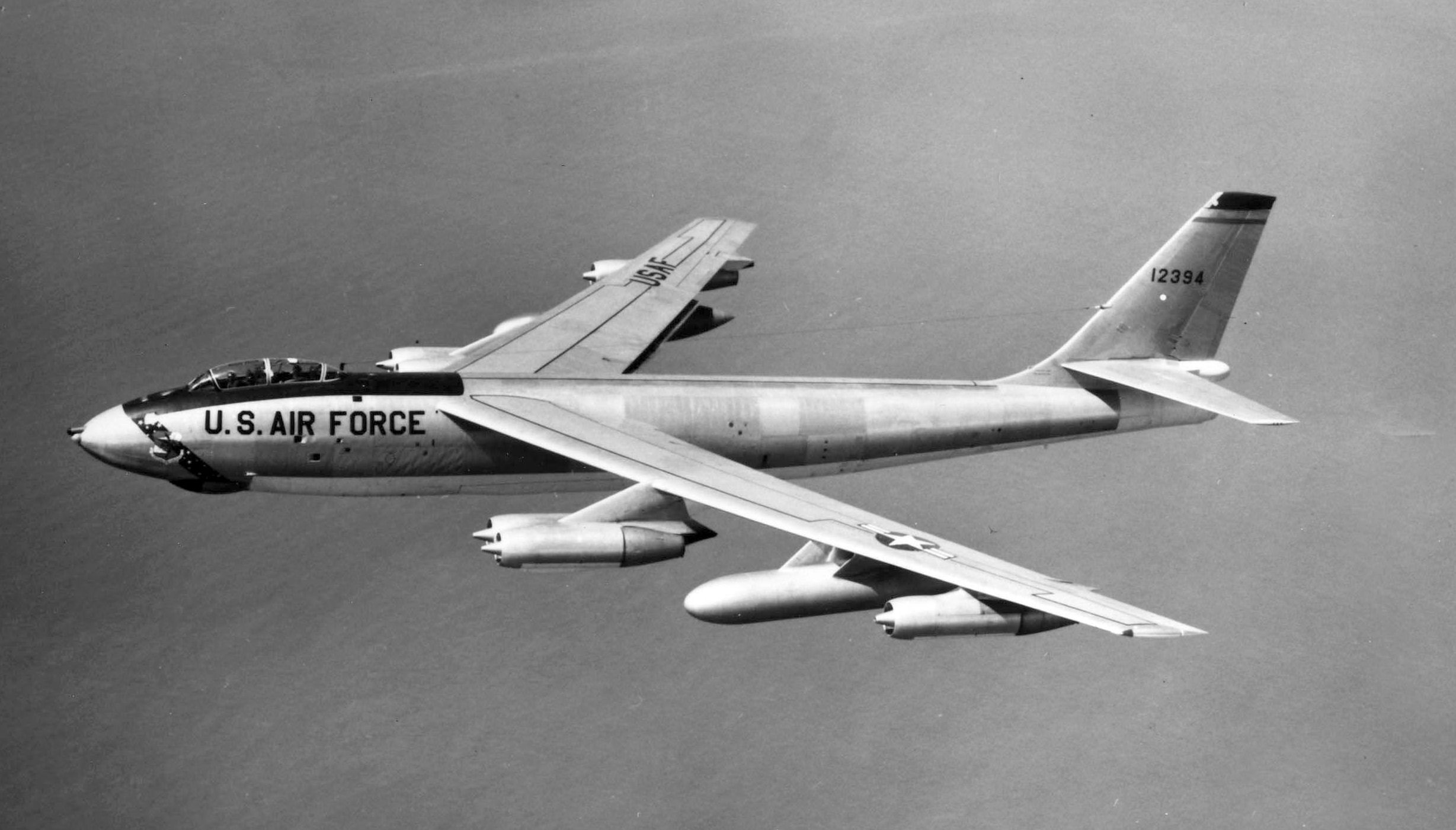
22d Bombardment Wing Boeing B-47E Stratojet

The 408th was activated at March Air Force Base, California in 1958 when Strategic Air Command (SAC) expanded its wings flying Boeing B-47 Stratojets from three to four squadrons. In March 1961, President John F. Kennedy directed that the phaseout of the B-47 be accelerated. and the squadron was inactivated on 1 January 1962 as part of the drawdown of the USAF B-47 force. Two years later, the squadron was combined with the preceding units, but remained inactive.

The 908th Air Refueling Squadron was activated on 1 July 1963 by SAC at Kincheloe Air Force Base, Michigan and equipped with Boeing KC-135 Stratotankers. Its mission was to provide air refueling to the Boeing B-52 Stratofortress strategic bombers of its parent 449th Bombardment Wing and other USAF units as directed. This included taskings to provide air refueling for McDonnell F-4 Phantom II fighters and Douglas RB-66 Destroyer reconnaissance aircraft deploying to Southeast Asia.

The unit deployed individual aircraft and crews to the Western Pacific region between 1966 and 1975 to support combat operations of deployed SAC units and tactical aircraft over Southeast Asia during the Vietnam War, including participation in Operation Young Tiger. The squadron also deployed crews and aircraft to support the Torrejon, Eielson and Hickam Tanker Task Forces.

In 1976 the squadron contributed to its parent 449th Bombardment Wing being awarded the Omaha Trophy as the best wing in SAC. It was inactivated on 30 September 1977 when Kincheloe closed.

In September 1985, the 908th was consolidated with the 408th, but for the time, it remained inactive.

=== Iraq and Afghanistan ===
The squadron was reactivated as the 908th Expeditionary Air Refueling Squadron, a provisional squadron, in July 2002 and equipped with McDonnell Douglas KC-10 Extenders. Boeing KC-135 Stratotankers were added in late 2003 until 2004e. The squadron conducted air refueling during the Iraq War and War in Afghanistan (2001-2021). The squadron's KC-10s can refuel aircraft with either a boom or with a drogue, which makes it capable of refueling Air Force or Navy aircraft, as well as aircraft from other coalition air forces. In 2010 the squadron flew the first combat mission with an all-female KC-10 crew. (Note: The crew consisted of Capt Lindsey Bauer, 1/Lt Jen Carter, SSG Sarah Lockley, and SSG Lindy Campbell. The crew jokingly referred to its KC-10 as an "unmanned aircraft" and designed a special patch to mark the occasion. Bergqvist, Pia (23 August 2010). "KC-10 Crew Completes Unmanned Aerial Refueling". Flying Magazine.) While refueling strike aircraft in Afghanistan and Iraq, during 2011, the squadron supported an average of more than four "Troops in Contact" events daily and provided about a third of the airborne fuel used to protect ground forces. As of 2017 it was supporting the Military intervention against ISIL in Iraq and Syria.

== Lineage ==
18th Aero Squadron'

- Organized as the 18th Aero Squadron on 20 August 1917

Redesignated 18th Aero Squadron (Training) c. 30 September 1917
Redesignated Squadron B, Rockwell Field on 23 July 1918
Demobilized on 23 November 1918
Reconstituted on 17 March 1925 and consolidated with the 18th Observation Squadron and Headquarters Squadron, Bolling Field as the 18th Headquarters Squadron

18th Observation Squadron

- Authorized as the 18th Squadron (Observation) on 30 August 1921

Organized on 1 October 1921
Inactivated on 23 July 1922
Redesignated 18th Observation Squadron on 25 January 1923 (remained inactive)
Disbanded on 18 February 1925
Reconstituted on 17 March 1925 and consolidated with Squadron B, Rockwell Field and Headquarters Squadron, Bolling Field as the 18th Headquarters Squadron

18th Headquarters Squadron

- Organized as Headquarters Detachment, Bolling Field on 11 July 1922

Redesignated Headquarters Squadron, Bolling Field on 6 October 1924
Consolidated on 17 March 1925 with Squadron B, Rockwell Field and the 18th Observation Squadron and redesignated 18th Headquarters Squadron
Inactivated on 31 March 1928
Disbanded on 1 October 1933
Reconstituted and consolidated in 1964 (Note: Per Maurer. Bailey states the consolidation did not occur until 27 March 2002.) with 408th Bombardment Squadron as the 408th Bombardment Squadron

408th Bombardment Squadron

- Constituted as the 18th Observation Squadron (Long Range, Light Bombardment) on 1 March 1935

Redesignated 18th Reconnaissance Squadron and activated on 1 September 1936
Redesignated 18th Reconnaissance Squadron (Medium Range) on 6 December 1939
Redesignated 18th Reconnaissance Squadron (Medium) on 20 November 1940
Redesignated 408th Bombardment Squadron (Medium) on 22 April 1942
Redesignated 408th Bombardment Squadron, Heavy on 3 February 1944
Inactivated on 29 April 1946
Redesignated 408th Bombardment Squadron, Medium on 6 October 1958
Activated on 1 January 1959
Discontinued and inactivated on 1 January 1962
Consolidated in 1964 with the 18th Headquarters Squadron
Consolidated on 19 September 1985 with the 908th Air Refueling Squadron as the 908th Air Refueling Squadron

908th Expeditionary Air Refueling Squadron

- Constituted as the 908th Air Refueling Squadron, Heavy on 20 March 1963 and activated (not organized)

Organized on 1 July 1963
Inactivated 30 September 1977
Consolidated on 19 September 1985 with the 408th Bombardment Squadron (remained inactive)
Redesignated 908th Expeditionary Air Refueling Squadron and converted to provisional status on 27 March 2002
Activated 6 July 2002
Inactivated July 2023

=== Assignments ===
- Air Service, Western Department, 20 August 1917
- Unknown, 23 July 2018 – 23 November 1918 (Note: Probably Post Headquarters, Rockwell Field.)
- Ninth Corps Area, 1 October 1921 – 23 July 1922
- District of Washington, 11 July 1922
- Third Corps Area, October 1927 – 31 March 1928
- 2d Wing, 1 September 1936 (attached to 9th Bombardment Group until 1 February 1940, then to 22d Bombardment Group)
- 22d Bombardment Group, 24 April 1942 – 29 April 1946
- 22d Bombardment Wing, 1 January 1959 – 1 January 1962
- 449th Bombardment Wing, 1 July 1963 – 30 September 1977
- Air Combat Command to assign as needed, 27 March 2002

380th Expeditionary Operations Group, 6 July 2002 – March 2022
378th Expeditionary Operations Group, March 2022 - July 2023378th Air Expeditionary Wing

=== Stations ===
- Rockwell Field, California, 20 August 1917 – 23 November 1918
- Rockwell Field, California, 1 October 1921 – 23 July 1922
- Bolling Field, District of Columbia, 11 July 1922 – 31 March 1928
- Mitchel Field, New York, 1 September 1936
- Langley Field, Virginia, 15 November 1940
- Muroc Army Air Field, California, 9 December 1941 – 29 January 1942
- Archerfield Airport (Brisbane), Australia, 25 February 1942
- RAAF Base Townsville, Australia, 7 April 1942
- Reid River Airfield, Australia, 12 April 1942
- Dobodura Airfield, New Guinea, 15 October 1943
- Nadzab Airfield, New Guinea, 22 December 1943
- Owi Airfield, Schouten Islands, Netherlands East Indies, 26 July 1944
- Dulag, Leyte, Philippines, c. 9 November 1944
- Angaur Airfield, Palau, c. 1 December 1944
- Guiuan Airfield, Samar, Philippines, 14 January 1945
- Clark Field, Luzon, Philippines, 13 March 1945
- Motobu Airfield, Okinawa, c. 21 August 1945
- Fort William McKinley, Luzon, Philippines, 23 November 1945 – 29 April 1946
- March Air Force Base, California, 1 January 1959 – 1 January 1962
- Kincheloe Air Force Base, Michigan, 1 July 1963 – 30 September 1977
- Al Dhafra Air Base, United Arab Emirates, 2002 – March 2022
- Prince Sultan Air Base, Saudi Arabia, March 2022 - July 2023

=== Aircraft ===
- Curtiss JN-4, 1917–1918
- Curtiss JN-6, 1917–1918
- Thomas-Morse S-4, 1917–1918
- Unknown, 1921–1922
- DeHavilland DH-4 during the period 1922–1928
- Ryan M-1 during the period 1922–1928
- Douglas O-2 during the period 1922–1928
- Boeing PW-9 during the period 1922–1928
- Curtiss P-1 Hawk during the period 1922–1928
- Curtiss 0-1 Falcon evidently during the period 1922–1928
- Martin B-10, 1936–1937
- Douglas B-18 Bolo, 1937–1941
- Northrop A-17, during period 1936–1940
- Fairchild C-8, during period 1936–1940
- Douglas OA-4 Dolphin, during period 1936–1940
- Sikorsky OA-8, during period 1936–1940
- North American B-25 Mitchell, 1941
- Martin B-26 Marauder, 1941–1943
- Consolidated B-24 Liberator, 1944–1945
- Boeing B-47 Stratojet, 1959–1961
- Boeing KC-135 Stratotanker, 1963–1977
- McDonnell Douglas KC-10 Extender, 2002–2023
- Boeing KC-135 Stratotanker, 2003–2004

=== Awards and campaigns ===
Award streamer	Award	Dates	Notes
	Distinguished Unit Citation Papua	23 July 1942 – January 1943	408th Bombardment Squadron
	Distinguished Unit Citation New Guinea	5 November 1943	408th Bombardment Squadron
	Air Force Outstanding Unit Award w/Combat "V" Device	1 June 2002–31 May 2003	908th Expeditionary Air Refueling Squadron
	Air Force Meritorious Unit Award	1 June 2003–31 May 2004	908th Expeditionary Air Refueling Squadron
	Air Force Meritorious Unit Award	1 January-31 December 2010	908th Expeditionary Air Refueling Squadron
	Air Force Meritorious Unit Award	20 June 2011-19 June 2012	908th Expeditionary Air Refueling Squadron
	Air Force Meritorious Unit Award	20 June 2012-19 June 2013	908th Expeditionary Air Refueling Squadron
	Air Force Meritorious Unit Award	1 July 2015-30 June 2016	908th Expeditionary Air Refueling Squadron
	Air Force Meritorious Unit Award	1 July 2016-30 June 2017	908th Expeditionary Air Refueling Squadron
	Air Force Outstanding Unit Award	1 July 1974-30 June 1976	908th Air Refueling Squadron
	Air Force Outstanding Unit Award	20 June 2011–19 June 2012	908th Expeditionary Air Refueling Squadron
	Philippine Republic Presidential Unit Citation	November 1944-4 July 1945	408th Bombardment Squadron

Campaign Streamer	Campaign	Dates	Notes
	Antisubmarine	7 December 1941 – 29 January 1942	18th Reconnaissance Squadron
	East Indies	25 February 1942 – 22 July 1942	18th Reconnaissance Squadron (later 408th Bombardment Squadron)
	Air Offensive, Japan	17 April 1942 – 2 September 1945	408th Bombardment Squadron
	China Defensive	4 July 1942 – 4 May 1945	408th Bombardment Squadron
	Papua	23 July 1942 – 23 January 1943	408th Bombardment Squadron
	New Guinea	24 January 1943 – 31 December 1944	408th Bombardment Squadron
	Bismarck Archipelago	15 December 1943 – 27 November 1944	408th Bombardment Squadron
	Western Pacific	17 April 1944 – 2 September 1945	408th Bombardment Squadron
	Leyte	17 October 1944 – 1 July 1945	408th Bombardment Squadron
	Luzon	15 December 1944 – 4 July 1945	408th Bombardment Squadron
	Southern Philippines	27 February 1945 – 4 July 1945	408th Bombardment Squadron
	China Offensive	5 May 1945 – 2 September 1945	408th Bombardment Squadron
	Air Combat, Asiatic-Pacific Theater	25 February 1942 – 2 March 1946	408th Bombardment Squadron
	Transition of Iraq	2 May 2003–28 June 2004	908th Expeditionary Air Refueling Squadron
	Global War on Terror Expeditionary Medal		908th Expeditionary Air Refueling Squadron

== See also ==
- List of United States Air Force air refueling squadrons
- List of American Aero Squadrons
- List of Martin B-26 Marauder operators
- United States Army Air Forces in Australia
- List of B-47 units of the United States Air Force
