= Prince Sultan Air Base =

Military air base in Al Kharj, Saudi Arabia

Prince Sultan Air Base
- قاعدة الأمير سلطان الجوية
- Al-Kharj, Riyadh Province in Saudi Arabia
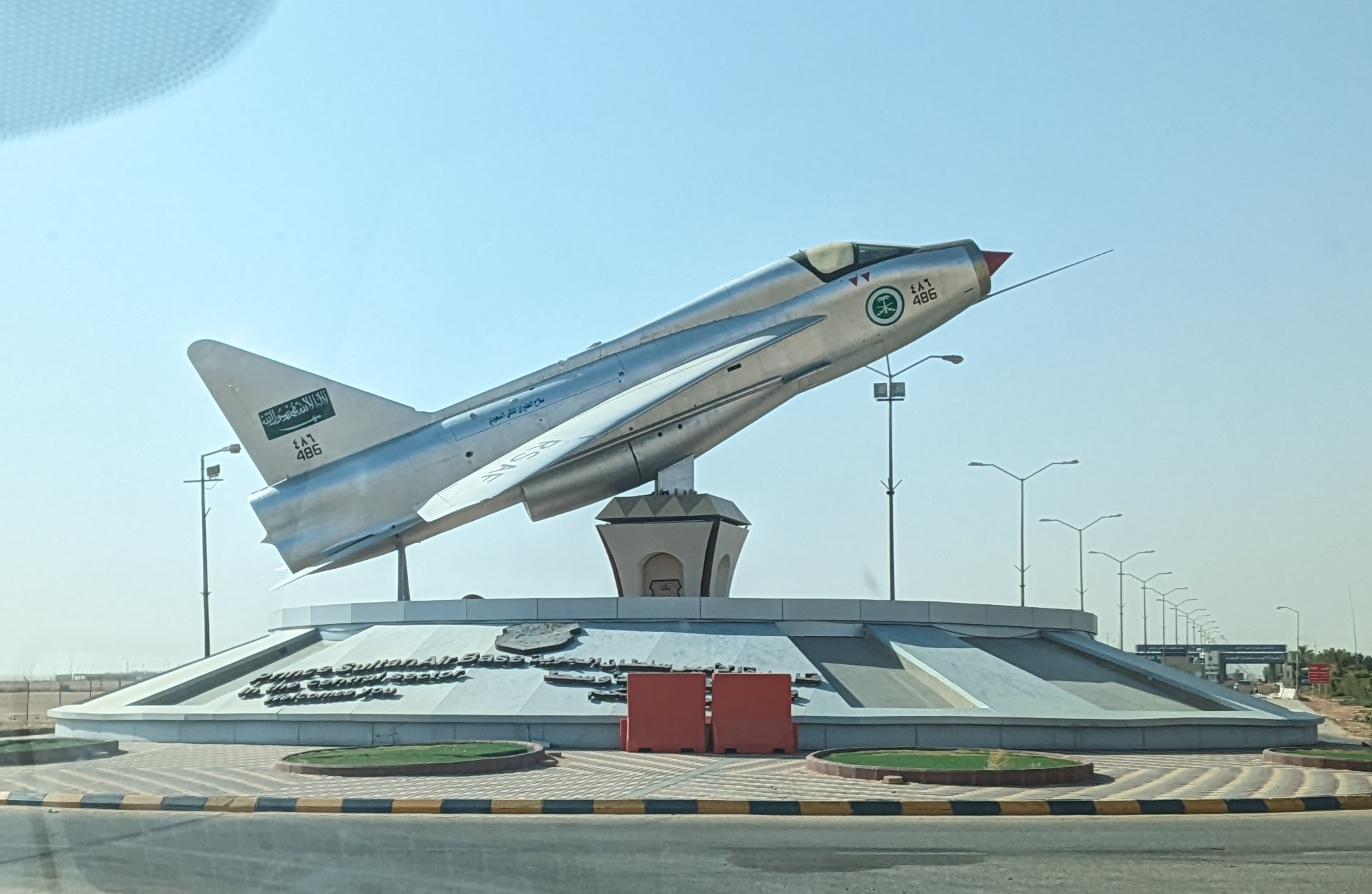
- English Electric Lightning gate guardian

- The emblem of Prince Sultan Air Base

Site information
- Type: Royal Saudi Air Force base
- Owner: Ministry of Defense
- Operator: Royal Saudi Air Force

Location
- Location in Saudi Arabia
- Coordinates: 24°03′19″N 047°33′49″E

Site history
- Built: 1951
- In use: 1951 – present

Garrison information
- Garrison: Wing 6 (Royal Saudi Air Force); 378th Air Expeditionary Wing (US Air Force)

Airfield information
- Identifiers: IATA: AKH, ICAO: OEPS
- Elevation: 503.2 metres (1,651 ft) AMSL
Runways
Direction	Length and surface
17L/35R	4,000 metres (13,123 ft) Asphalt
17R/35L	4,000 metres (13,123 ft) Asphalt
- Sources: World Aero Data

Prince Sultan Air Base (PSAB, Arabic: قاعدة الأمير سلطان الجوية, IATA: AKH, ICAO: OEPS) is a military air base located in Al Kharj, Saudi Arabia. It is named after former Saudi defense minister and Crown Prince of Saudi Arabia Sultan bin Abdulaziz Al Saud.

== History ==
There was a large United States presence there during Operations Southern Watch, Enduring Freedom, and Iraqi Freedom. The U.S. presence was predominantly that of multiple United States Air Force (USAF) flying units, augmented by a United States Navy (USN) or United States Marine Corps (USMC) Northrop Grumman EA-6B Prowler squadron, a Royal Air Force (RAF) fighter squadron with Panavia Tornado F.3s and a French Air Force fighter squadron with Dassault Mirage 2000s, Mirage F1 CR plus a Boeing C-135RF Stratotanker air refueling aircraft. Following the attack on USAF facilities at Khobar Towers in Dharan in 1996, all USAF activities at that location were relocated to PSAB.

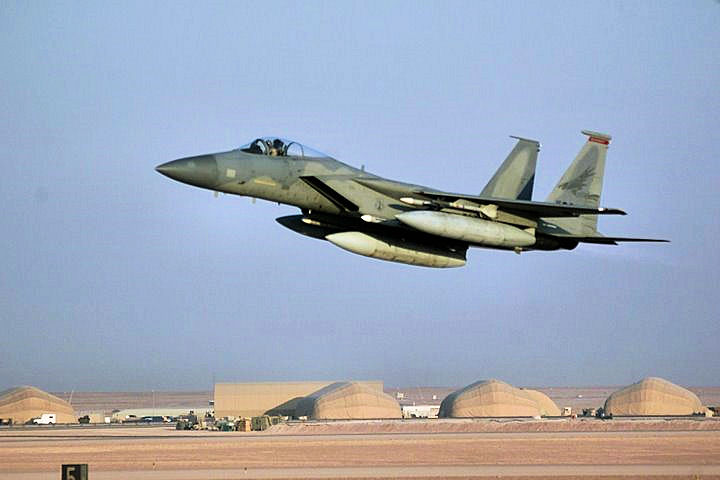
An Air National Guard F-15C Eagle fighter taking off from Prince Sultan Air Base in 2000

Before the September 11 attacks, per agreement with the Saudi Arabian government, all U.S. and Allied aircraft stationed at PSAB were to be of a "defensive" versus "offensive" nature. This was due to Arab sensitivities that non-Royal Saudi Air Force (RSAF) aircraft in the Kingdom of Saudi Arabia should be perceived as there for the Kingdom's defense.

During Operation Southern Watch, aircraft carrying offensive strike ordnance for use against ground targets in Iraq were stationed in Kuwait or aboard aircraft carriers in the Persian Gulf. United States Air Force, United States Navy, United States Marine Corps, Royal Air Force, and French Air Force aircraft that were based at PSAB primarily consisted of airborne early warning, reconnaissance, air refueling, electronic warfare, suppression of enemy air defenses (SEAD), and air-to-air fighter aircraft, along with transient airlift aircraft. U.S. squadrons came under the operational control of the formerly 4404th Wing (Provisional), 363rd Air Expeditionary Wing (363 AEW) at PSAB, with associated squadrons or detachments before 11 Sep 2001 rotated in and out from their home bases in Europe, the United States, or the Pacific on a 90-day to 6-month basis. During Operation Southern Watch, in addition to Active Component aircraft, the USAF made extensive use of Air National Guard (ANG) and Air Force Reserve Command (AFRC) McDonnell Douglas F-15 Eagle, General Dynamics F-16 Fighting Falcon, and Boeing KC-135 Stratotanker aircraft and associated personnel on rotational assignments to PSAB. The United States Navy, Navy Reserve, and United States Marine Corps also employed EA-6B aircraft from PSAB as well.

In August and early September 1998, Joint Task Force Southwest Asia (JTF-SWA) and its associated Coalition Air Operations Center (CAOC) were in the process of relocating from the Eskan Village complex in Riyadh to PSAB, concurrent with construction of a more modern and expanded CAOC at PSAB. The 1996 Khobar Towers bombing accelerated this movement, so that subsequent command and control of all Coalition air operations for Operations Enduring Freedom and the 2003 invasion of Iraq were executed from PSAB, before 11 September 2001.

During the War in Afghanistan, the Saudi government refused to allow the United States to use its air bases in Saudi Arabia to launch offensive air operations against the Islamic Emirate of Afghanistan and al-Qaeda, but did allow them to use Prince Sultan Air Base to coordinate offensive air operations of air combat operations launched from other countries. In mid-2003, all U.S. operations at PSAB began migrating to Al Udeid Air Base in Doha, Qatar.

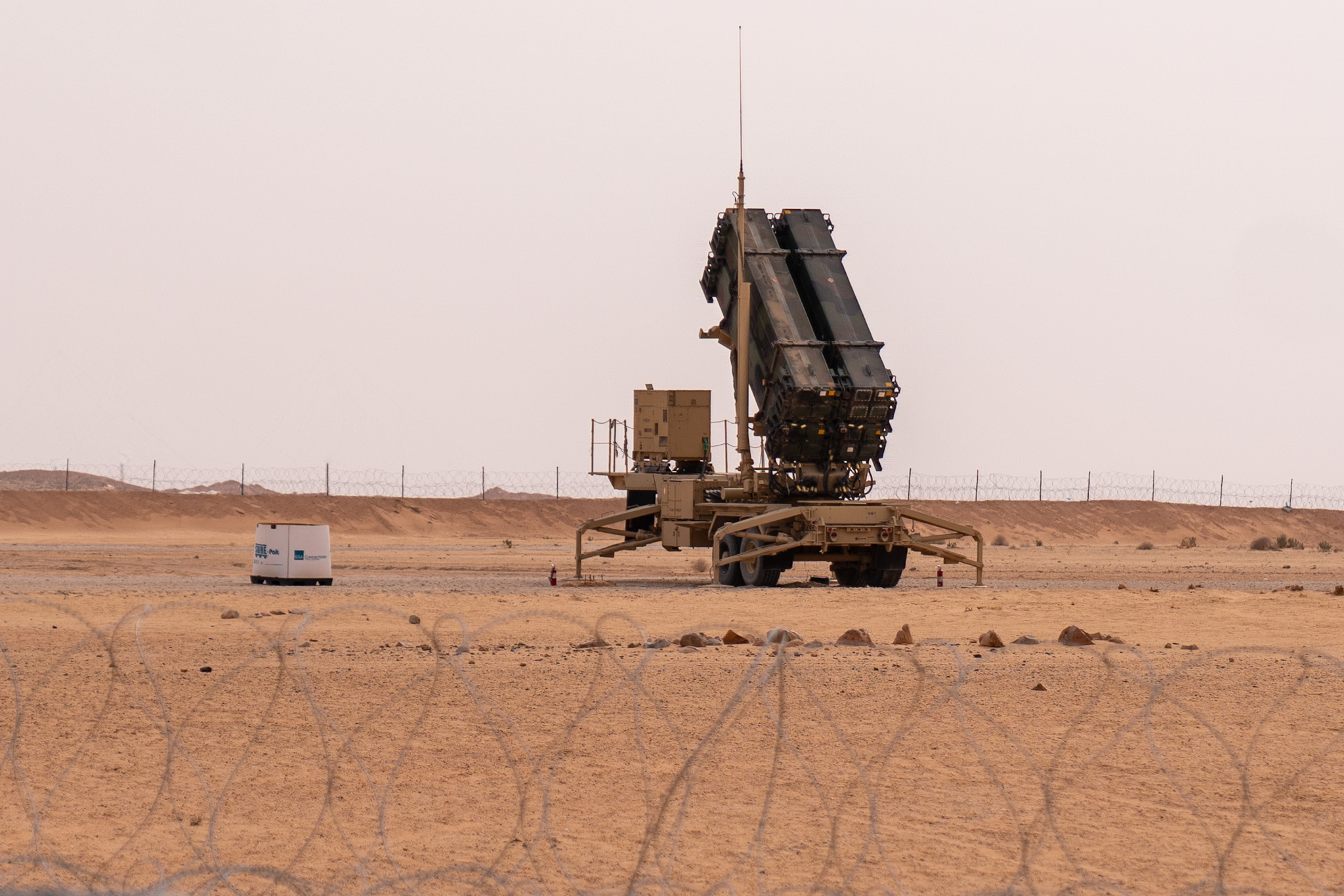
Patriot missile batteries located at Prince Sultan Air Base in 2020.

Between 2003 and 2005, Vickers VC10s from No. 101 Squadron RAF were based here in support of Operation Telic before moving to RAF Al Udeid (a section of the Al Udeid Air Base in Qatar).

In October 2019, 2,000 U.S. troops joined approximately 700 service members already stationed at the air base, along with deploying B-1B bombers, F-22 Raptor stealth fighters, and Patriot missile batteries. The new troop buildup followed several attacks on oil tankers by Iran in the Gulf of Oman.

The 378th Air Expeditionary Wing was activated at Prince Sultan on 17 December 2019, with the Air Force stating that the wing's mission is to 'provide strategic depth and increased defensive support while sustaining regional presence to promote peace through deterrence'.

=== 2026 Iran war ===
On 2 March 2026, during the 2026 Iran war, Saudi Arabia's Ministry of Defence announced that five hostile drones were intercepted and destroyed near the Prince Sultan base. The incident followed a separate drone strike earlier the same day on Saudi Aramco's Ras Tanura refinery. According to official statements, the drones were neutralised before reaching their targets, and no casualties were reported. On 8 March, US Army Staff Sgt. Benjamin N. Pennington died of wounds received during a March 1 enemy attack on Prince Sultan AB, becoming the 7th US military death in the Iran War. The Wall Street Journal reported that about a week later, that five U.S. Air Force refueling planes were damaged at the base during an Iranian missile strike on the base. On 27 March, an Iranian missile and drone strike on the base damaged several US refueling aircraft and injured fifteen US soldiers, including five critically. An E-3 Sentry was destroyed by the strike. It was also reported that an attack earlier that week injured 14 US soldiers. Despite President Trump's public rejection of Ukrainian president Volodymyr Zelenskiy's offer to assist in combatting Iranian drone strikes, the US sent Ukrainian counter-drone technology to the base after Iranian strikes caused damage and casualties.

== Current use ==
- RSAF Wing 6:
  - No. 17 OCU Squadron RSAF
  - No. 18 Squadron RSAF with the Boeing E-3A Sentry Airborne Warning and Control System (AWACS) surveillance aircraft.
  - No. 19 Squadron RSAF with the Beech Model 350i Super King Air and the Boeing RE-3A/B signals intelligence aircraft
- RSAF Wing 4:
  - No. 23 Squadron RSAF with the Boeing KE-3A airborne refueller
  - No. 24 Squadron RSAF with the Airbus A330-203/243 MRTT
  - No. 32 Squadron RSAF with the Lockheed KC-130H Hercules & KC-130J
- RSAF Wing 14:
  - No. 41 Squadron RSAF with the Beech Model 350i Super King Air
  - No. 50 Squadron RSAF with the Beech Model 350i Super King Air
  - No. 60 Squadron RSAF with the Saab 2000 AEW&C

== Facilities ==
The air base resides at an elevation of 1,651 feet (503 m) above mean sea level. It has two runways designated 17L/R/35L/R, with an asphalt surface measuring 4,000 by 45 metres (13,123 ft × 148 ft).

The base currently uses hundreds of tents for temporary housing, though there are plans to replace them with trailers and more permanent structures.

The US Air Force 378th Expeditionary Civil Engineer Squadron is responsible for pest management on the base.

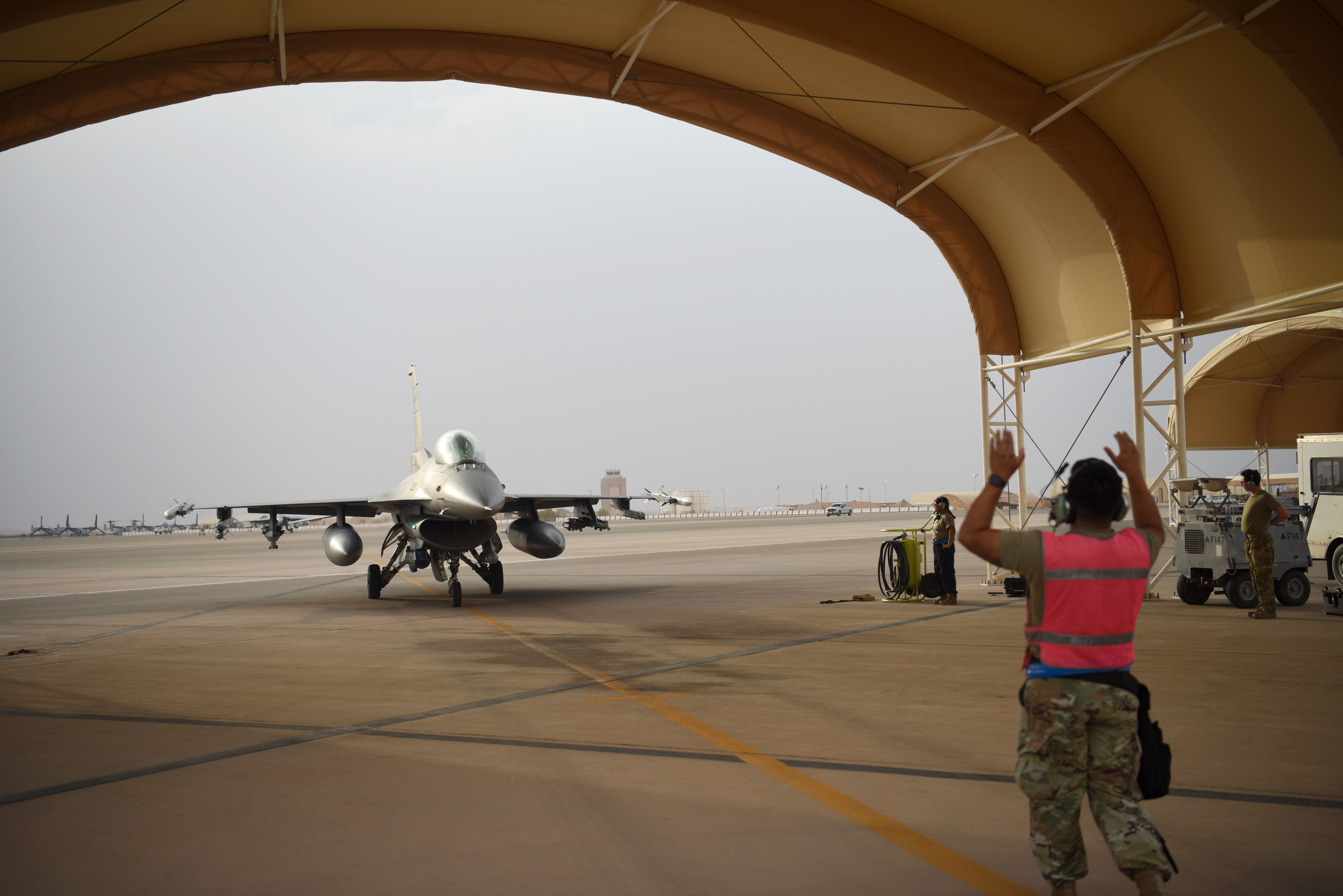
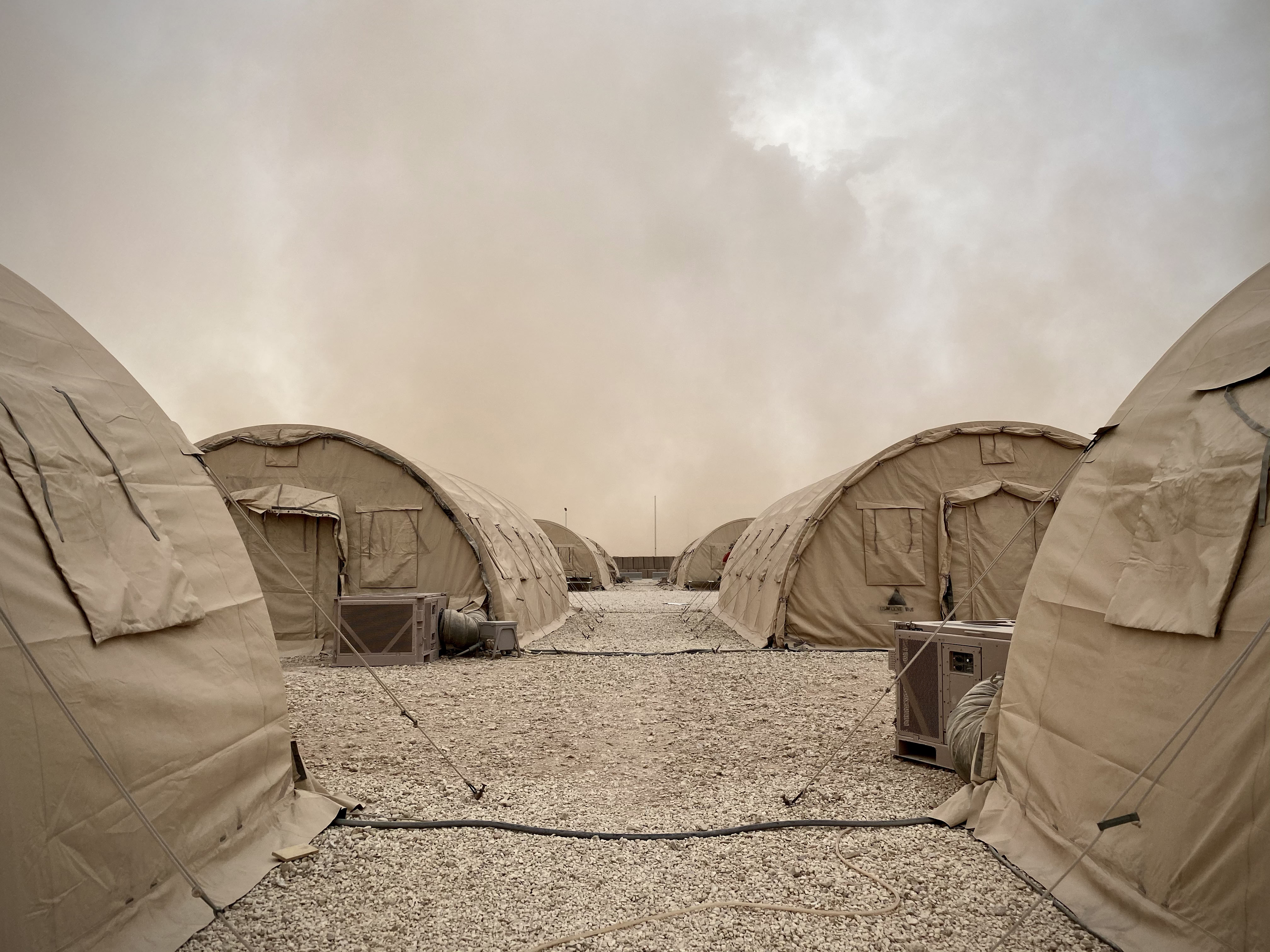
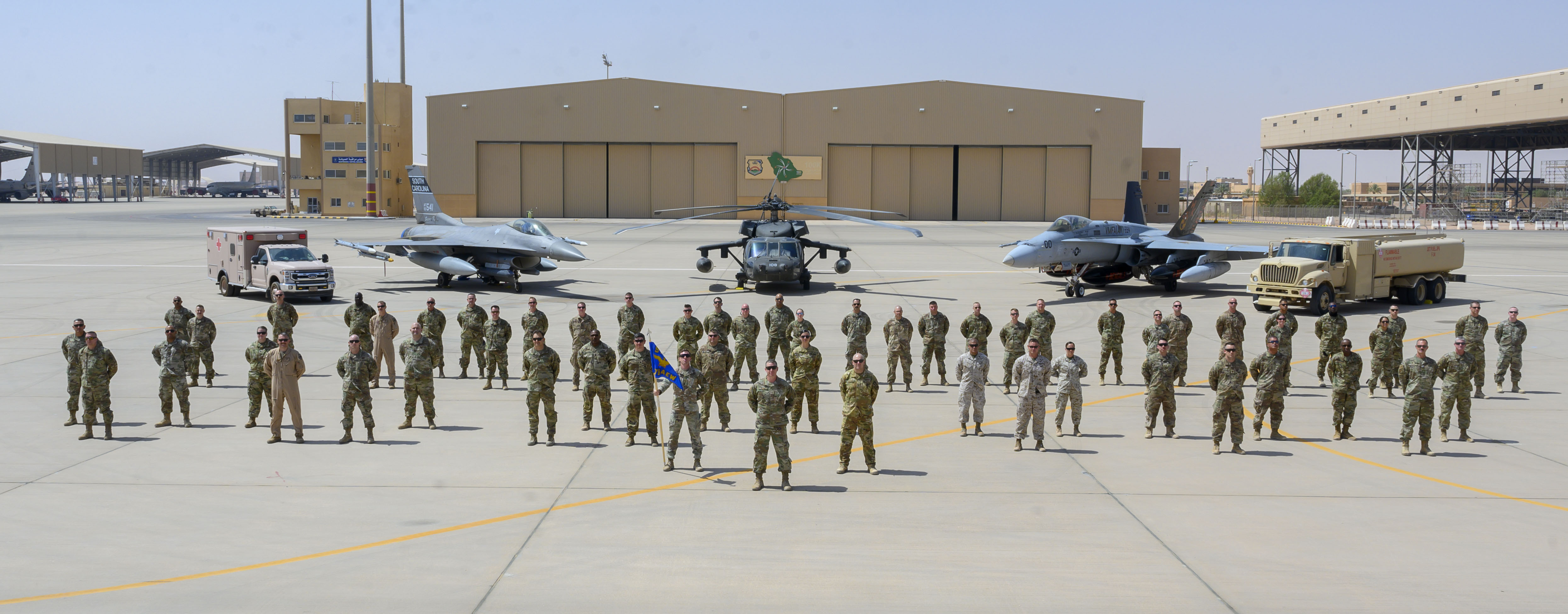
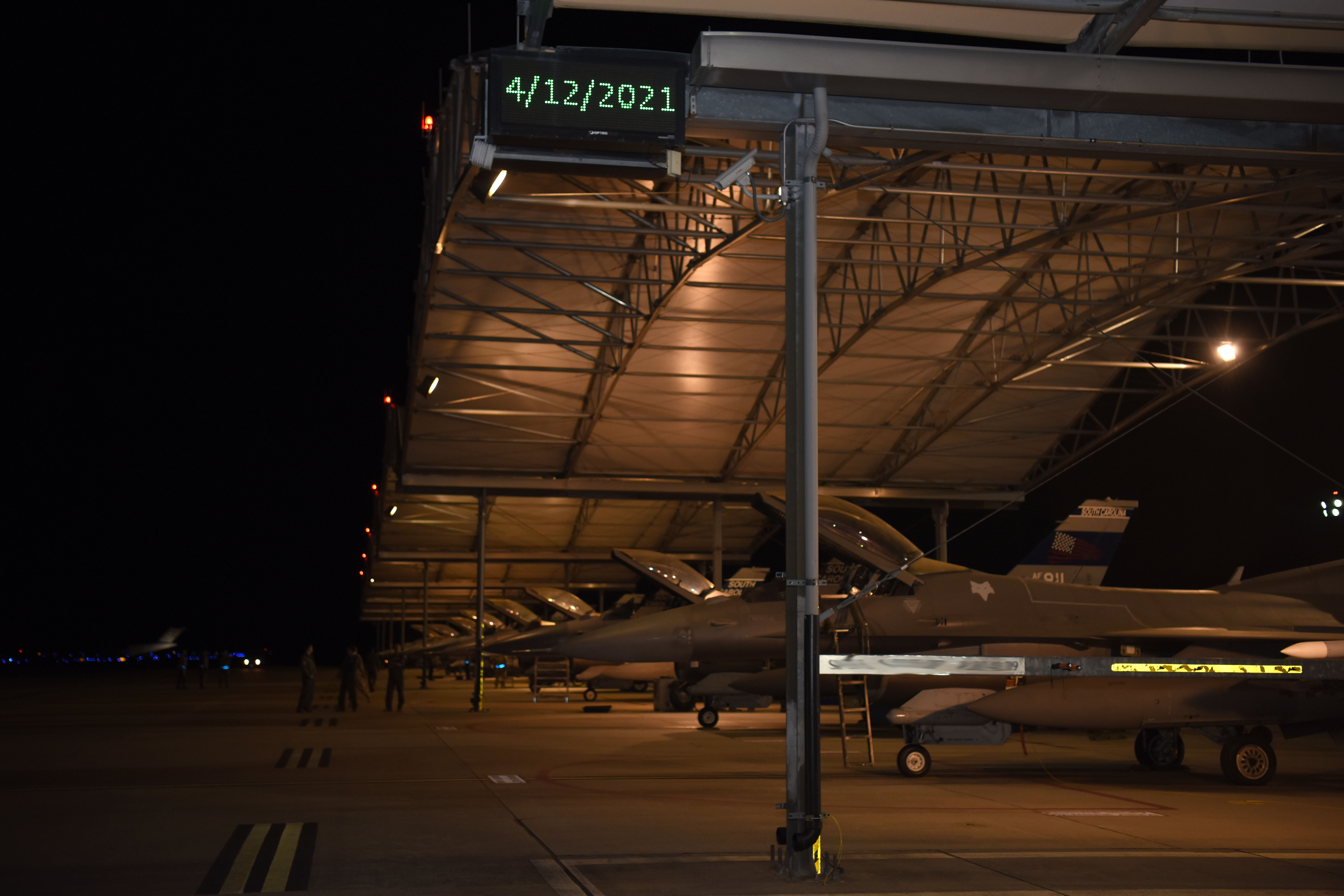
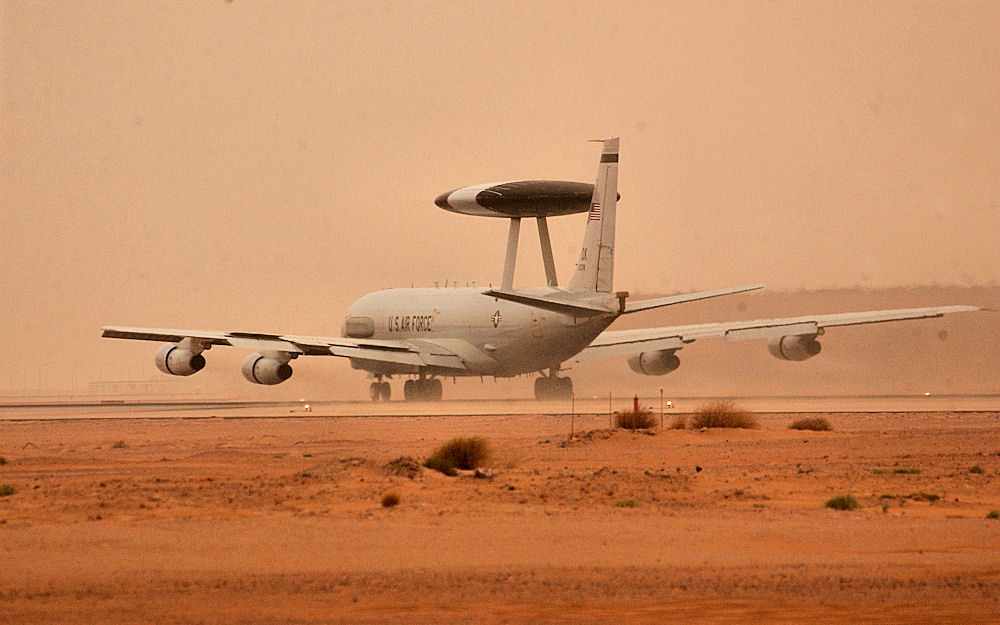
U.S. forces using the air base

== See also ==
- List of military installations in Saudi Arabia
