= Al-Kharj =

Governorate in Riyadh Province, Saudi Arabia

Al-Kharj الخرج
- Governorate
- Location of Al-Kharj Governorate within Riyadh Province

- Location within Saudi Arabia
- Coordinates: 23°51′45″N 47°40′30″E
- Country: Saudi Arabia
- Province: Riyadh Province
- Region: Najd
- Seat: Al-Saih

Government
  - Type: Municipality
  - Body: Al-Kharj Municipality

Area
  - Total: 19,790 km^{2} (7,640 sq mi)

Population (2022)
  - Total: 373,177
  - Density: 18.86/km^{2} (48.84/sq mi)
- Time zone: UTC+03:00 (SAST)

Al-Kharj or Kharj (Arabic: الخرج) is a governorate in Riyadh Province, Saudi Arabia. It is located 83 km (52 mi) southeast of the capital city, and has the second-largest population in the province.

== History ==
Al-Kharj, with its historical monuments, is an important destination for researchers and those interested in the history of the Kingdom of Saudi Arabia and of its founder, King Abdulaziz. Al-Kharj has some of the factors that are considered essential for tourism in the Kingdom and has sought to grow archeology tourism, as there is a feast of archaeological monuments, perhaps the most important of which is the King Abdulaziz Palace. The historical site located in Al-Aziziyah (Arabic: العزيزية) district in the heart of Al-Saih City. It was built in 1359 AH (1940-1941 AD) in the center of Al-Saih City A Saudi-French archaeological mission in 2018 uncovered sites dating back to approximately one hundred thousand years in the governorate.

Among the historical palaces around in Al-Kharj is "Abu Jafan Palace" (Arabic: قصر أبو جفان), located east of the city of Al-Saih. It was built during the reign of King Abdulaziz in 1366 AH (1946-1947 AD) for those coming from the eastern regions and for pilgrims to the Great Mosque of Mecca, which is still open to visitors.

The city of Dalam (Arabic: الدلم), which has a historical value to Al-Kharj governorate, abounds with many archaeological monuments and witnessed many historical battles such as a fierce battle between King Abdulalaziz and Ibn Rashid (Arabic: ابن رشيد). The city's population is 35,800.

The town of Al-Yamama (Arabic: اليمامة), located in the north of the city of Al-Saih, is one of the oldest towns in the Arabian Peninsula (Arabic: شبة الجزيرة العربية). In the northeastern corner of the town is one of the oldest settlements, Al-Banna (Arabic: البنة). It is part of the old settlement on the site before Islam. Pieces of pottery were found in surrounding areas of the town and indicate a settlement that extends from the mid 3rd millennium BC. Also, three ancient coins have been found on the site, as well as accessories made of silver and bronze.

== Economy ==
The economy of the Al-Kharj Governorate is one of the most vital sub-regional economies in the Riyadh Province. Strategically located southeast of the capital city, Al-Kharj serves as a critical agricultural, industrial, and logistical hub for the Kingdom of Saudi Arabia.

Local commerce, investment frameworks, and private-sector integration are driven by the Al-Kharj Chamber of Commerce and Industry, which was established in 2005. Under the economic diversification mandates of Saudi Vision 2030, the governorate has increasingly transitioned from a traditional agrarian oasis into a diversified hub for manufacturing and public-private partnerships.

=== Agriculture and Dairy Industry ===
Historically a flourishing desert oasis fed by natural springs, Al-Kharj underwent a massive technological revolution in the late 20th century. Today, the governorate functions as the primary "food basket" of the Kingdom, yielding more than 26% of Saudi Arabia's total vegetable output alongside substantial volumes of wheat, dates, and greenhouse produce.

==== The "Dairy Capital" ====
Al-Kharj is internationally recognized as the "Dairy Capital" of the Middle East, producing over 65% of Saudi Arabia's national milk supply. The region's unique geography allows massive, climate-controlled farming models to thrive despite the arid climate. The governorate serves as the primary operational and processing base for several of the region’s largest agricultural conglomerates:

- Almarai: Operates its massive central processing super-factories and livestock divisions within the governorate.
- Al Safi Danone: Manages one of the world's largest integrated dairy farms in the area.
- Nadec (National Agricultural Development Company)
- ARASCO (Arabian Agricultural Services Company)

The supply chains originating from these Al-Kharj facilities satisfy consumer demand across Saudi Arabia, the broader Gulf Cooperation Council (GCC) states, and neighboring Levant markets.

==== Agribusiness Infrastructure ====
To support this massive output, Al-Kharj hosts specialized educational and industrial backbones, most notably the Food Industries Institute. This institute directly trains the local workforce in modern food security, automated packaging, and supply chain management. The region also hosts the annual Al-Kharj Dairy and Food Festival, which draws regional investors and celebrates the area's agricultural heritage.

== Industry and Infrastructure ==
=== Al-Kharj Industrial City ===
Industrial development in the governorate is centered heavily within Al-Kharj Industrial City (managed by MODON), a massive manufacturing zone spanning over 24 million square meters. The city hosts approximately 500 active factories with capital investments surpassing SR5 billion ($1.33 billion). The industrial sector comprises:

- Advanced Manufacturing: Large-scale facilities dedicated to pharmaceuticals, consumer chemicals, and construction materials.
- Fabricated Metals and Machinery: Factories producing structural steel, electrical equipment, and renewable energy technologies.

=== Military and Defense Sector ===
A distinct and historically significant pillar of Al-Kharj's infrastructure is its concentration of defense installations and state-owned military enterprises. The capital city of the governorate, Al-Saih, is home to the General Corporation for Military Industries, which operates advanced defense production factories. Additionally, the region hosts the Prince Sultan Air Base and primary arms and supply depots for the Saudi Ministry of Defense, providing substantial government-backed employment for local citizens.

=== Transportation and Logistics ===
The logistical relevance of Al-Kharj is anchored by its highly developed transport links. The city is directly connected to Riyadh and the industrial ports of the Persian Gulf via the main network of the Saudi Railways Company (SAR). This rail infrastructure allows for the swift, low-cost freight of industrial commodities, military equipment, and agricultural products across the country.

== Education ==
The city is home to a number of state schools, which are fully funded by the government, and public and international schools teaching foreign curricula. The city is also home to Prince Sattam bin Abdulaziz University.

== See also ==
- Provinces of Saudi Arabia
- List of governorates of Saudi Arabia
- List of cities and towns in Saudi Arabia
